= National Register of Historic Places listings in Hunterdon County, New Jersey =

Location of Hunterdon County in New Jersey

List of the National Register of Historic Places listings in Hunterdon County, New Jersey

Contents: Counties and communities in New Jersey
Atlantic – Bergen (Closter, Franklin Lakes, Ridgewood, Saddle River, Wyckoff) – Burlington – Camden – Cape May – Cumberland – Essex – Gloucester – Hudson – Hunterdon – Mercer – Middlesex – Monmouth – Morris – Ocean – Passaic – Salem – Somerset – Sussex – Union – Warren

This is intended to be a complete list of properties and districts listed on the National Register of Historic Places in Hunterdon County, New Jersey. Latitude and longitude coordinates of the sites listed on this page may be displayed in an online map.

This National Park Service list is complete through NPS recent listings posted October 23, 2026.

| | Name on the Register | Image | Date listed | Location | City or town | Description |
|---|---|---|---|---|---|---|
| 1 | Amsterdam Historic District | Amsterdam Historic District | March 17, 1995 (#95000184) | Amsterdam, Church, and Crab Apple Hill roads 40°35′15″N 75°09′34″W | Amsterdam | |
| 2 | Annandale Historic District | Annandale Historic District | September 8, 1994 (#94001108) | Roughly bounded by Maple Avenue, Main Street, Beaver Avenue and East Street; 40°38′34″N 74°52′50″W | Annandale | |
| 3 | J. K. Apgar Farmhouse | J. K. Apgar Farmhouse | November 1, 1979 (#79001494) | CR 512 and Guinea Hollow Rd. 40°42′59″N 74°49′38″W | Califon | |
| 4 | Asbury Historic District | Asbury Historic District | March 19, 1993 (#93000132) | County Routes 632 and 643, Maple Avenue, Kitchen Road, and School Street, Asbury; 40°41′53″N 75°00′50″W | Bethlehem Township | Primarily in Asbury, Warren County |
| 5 | Bartles House | Bartles House | March 14, 2007 (#06000763) | 159 Oldwick Road; 40°39′51″N 74°45′06″W | Tewksbury Township | |
| 6 | Bowne Station Road stone arch bridge over tributary of the Alexauken Creek | Bowne Station Road stone arch bridge over tributary of the Alexauken Creek | April 11, 2024 (#100010172) | Bowne Station Road over tributary of the Alexauken Creek, Bowne; 40°25′11″N 74°54′48″W | Delaware Township, East Amwell Township | Part of the Historic Bridges of Delaware Township, Hunterdon County, New Jersey Multiple Property Submission (MPS) |
| 7 | Bray–Hoffman House | Bray–Hoffman House | January 25, 1973 (#73001104) | 39 Sand Hill Road; 40°38′13″N 74°51′31″W | Clinton Township | |
| 8 | Buchanan Road stone arch bridge over a tributary of Alexauken Creek | Buchanan Road stone arch bridge over a tributary of Alexauken Creek | March 17, 2025 (#100011522) | Buchanan Road at a tributary of Alexauken Creek; 40°25′24″N 74°56′04″W | Delaware Township | Part of the Historic Bridges of Delaware Township, Hunterdon County, New Jersey MPS |
| 9 | Califon Historic District | Califon Historic District | October 14, 1976 (#76001157) | Main, Academy, Mill, Bank and First streets; Railroad and Philhower avenues; and River Road; 40°43′07″N 74°50′11″W | Califon | |
| 10 | Carrell–Kurzenberger Farmstead | Carrell–Kurzenberger Farmstead | September 28, 2026 (#100013430) | 51 Lambert Road; 40°27′05″N 74°55′19″W | Delaware Township | |
| 11 | Case-Dvoor Farmstead | Case-Dvoor Farmstead | December 11, 2009 (#09001074) | 111 Mine Street; 40°30′19″N 74°52′15″W | Raritan Township | Headquarters of the Hunterdon Land Trust |
| 12 | Case Farmstead | Case Farmstead | August 14, 1979 (#79001496) | West of Pattenburg on SR 14; 40°38′02″N 75°01′57″W | Pattenburg | |
| 13 | Clinton Historic District | Clinton Historic District | September 28, 1995 (#95001101) | Center, West Main, Main, East Main, Halstead, Water, and Leigh streets 40°38′17″N 74°54′37″W | Clinton | |
| 14 | Clover Hill Historic District | Clover Hill Historic District | September 29, 1980 (#80002492) | Amwell and Wertsville-Clover Hill Roads; 40°29′14″N 74°47′01″W | Clover Hill | Extends into Somerset County |
| 15 | Cokesbury Historic District | Cokesbury Historic District | July 17, 1997 (#97000802) | Cokesbury-Califon Road, CR 639, Water Street, and McCatharn Road; 40°41′00″N 74°50′16″W | Cokesbury | |
| 16 | Cold Water Bridge | Cold Water Bridge | March 17, 2025 (#100011520) | Pine Hill Road at Cold Water Creek; 40°26′41″N 74°57′54″W | Delaware Township | Part of the Historic Bridges of Delaware Township, Hunterdon County, New Jersey MPS |
| 17 | Covered Bridge Historic District | Covered Bridge Historic District | March 5, 1999 (#99000269) | Roughly along CR 604, Pine Hill Road, and Lower Creek Road; 40°26′44″N 74°57′50″W | Delaware Township | Includes Cold Water Bridge and Green Sergeant's Covered Bridge |
| 18 | Dart's Mill Historic District | Dart's Mill Historic District | April 29, 1982 (#82003279) | Northeast of Flemington on Rt. 523, Darts Mills; 40°32′16″N 74°50′04″W | Readington Township | |
| 19 | Dawlis Mill–Spring Mills Historic District | Dawlis Mill–Spring Mills Historic District | October 27, 2004 (#04001192) | 525 and 530 NJ 31; 40°24′56″N 74°51′40″W | East Amwell Township, West Amwell Township | |
| 20 | Delaware and Raritan Canal | Delaware and Raritan Canal | May 11, 1973 (#73001105) | Follows the Delaware River to Trenton, then E to New Brunswick; 40°32′40″N 75°02′50″W | Lambertville | |
| 21 | District No. 98 Schoolhouse | District No. 98 Schoolhouse | January 12, 2005 (#04001477) | 19 S. Main St. 40°24′25″N 74°58′30″W | Stockton Borough | |
| 22 | Dunham's Mill | Dunham's Mill | April 15, 1982 (#82003277) | 7 Lower Center Street; 40°38′11″N 74°54′43″W | Clinton | Home to the Hunterdon Art Museum |
| 23 | Everittstown Historic District | Everittstown Historic District | August 28, 1980 (#80002496) | Intersection of CR 513, CR 519 and Palmyra Road, Everittstown; 40°33′58″N 75°01′41″W | Alexandria Township | |
| 24 | Charles Eversole House | Charles Eversole House | February 1, 2006 (#05001563) | 509 Cty Rd. 523; 40°35′56″N 74°46′39″W | Readington Township | |
| 25 | Fairmount Historic District | Fairmount Historic District | December 20, 1996 (#96001470) | NJ 517 from the Morris-Hunterdon County line to NJ 512 and NJ 517 from Fox Hill to Wildwood Roads, Fairmount; 40°43′08″N 74°46′30″W | Tewksbury Township | Extends into Washington Township, Morris County |
| 26 | Fairmount–Pottersville Road stone arch bridge over Hollow Brook | Fairmount–Pottersville Road stone arch bridge over Hollow Brook | May 21, 2026 (#100013039) | Abandoned, former alignment of Fairmount–Pottersville Road within the boundaries of the Tewksbury Land Trust; 40°43′29″N 74°45′16″W | Tewksbury Township | Part of the Historic Bridges of Tewksbury Township, Hunterdon County, New Jersey MPS |
| 27 | Federal Twist Road stone arch bridge over Shirt Run Creek | Federal Twist Road stone arch bridge over Shirt Run Creek | March 17, 2025 (#100011521) | Federal Twist Road at Shirt Run Creek; 40°25′48″N 75°01′28″W | Delaware Township | Part of the Historic Bridges of Delaware Township, Hunterdon County, New Jersey MPS |
| 28 | Fink-Type Truss Bridge | Fink-Type Truss Bridge | December 24, 1974 (#74001161) | West of Allerton off NJ 31 over South Branch of Raritan River; 40°36′14″N 74°54′10″W | Clinton Township | Demolished. |
| 29 | Flemington Historic District | Flemington Historic District | September 17, 1980 (#80002493) | Roughly bounded by NJ 12, NJ 31, N. Main, Shields, and Hopewell Aves. 40°30′32″N 74°51′38″W | Flemington | Includes Hunterdon County Courthouse, Samuel Fleming House, and Union Hotel |
| 30 | Frenchtown Historic District | Frenchtown Historic District | May 19, 1994 (#94000438) | Bounded by 12th Street, Washington Street, the Delaware River and Nishisakawick Creek; 40°31′39″N 75°03′45″W | Frenchtown | Includes Uhlerstown–Frenchtown Bridge |
| 31 | Frog Hollow Road Bridge over minor tributary of the South Branch Raritan River | Frog Hollow Road Bridge over minor tributary of the South Branch Raritan River | December 12, 2002 (#02001509) | Frog Hollow Road; 40°43′48″N 74°49′06″W | Tewksbury Township | Part of the Historic Bridges of Tewksbury Township, Hunterdon County, New Jersey Multiple Property Submission (MPS) |
| 32 | Glen Gardner Pony Pratt Truss Bridge | Glen Gardner Pony Pratt Truss Bridge | September 22, 1977 (#77000876) | School Street over Spruce Run; 40°42′05″N 74°56′36″W | Glen Gardner | |
| 33 | Green Sergeant's Covered Bridge | Green Sergeant's Covered Bridge | November 19, 1974 (#74001165) | Rosemont-Sergeantsville Road over the Wickecheoke Creek; 40°26′39″N 74°57′59″W | Delaware Township | |
| 34 | Headquarters Historic District | Headquarters Historic District | July 14, 2011 (#11000447) | Rosemont-Ringoes Road, Zentek Road; 40°26′27″N 74°55′25″W | Headquarters | Boundary increase February 8, 2016. |
| 35 | High Bridge Reformed Church | High Bridge Reformed Church | November 21, 1980 (#80002494) | Church St. and CR 513; 40°40′13″N 74°53′41″W | High Bridge | |
| 36 | Highfields | Highfields | September 23, 1994 (#94001096) | End of Lindbergh Road; 40°25′26″N 74°46′04″W | East Amwell Township | |
| 37 | Hollow Brook Road Bridge over tributary of the Lamington River | Hollow Brook Road Bridge over tributary of the Lamington River | December 12, 2002 (#02001510) | Hollow Brook Road; 40°43′02″N 74°44′11″W | Tewksbury Township | Part of the Historic Bridges of Tewksbury Township, Hunterdon County, New Jersey MPS |
| 38 | Imlaydale Historic District | Imlaydale Historic District | March 27, 1991 (#91000306) | Imlaydale Road and surrounding land between NJ 31 and the Musconetcong River, Washington and Lebanon Townships; 40°42′47″N 74°58′07″W | Hampton | Primarily in Washington Township, Warren County |
| 39 | Kalmia Club | Kalmia Club | April 16, 2012 (#12000208) | 39 York Street; 40°22′06″N 74°56′40″W | Lambertville | Part of the Clubhouses of New Jersey Women's Clubs Multiple Property Submission |
| 40 | Kline Farmhouse | Kline Farmhouse | July 11, 1984 (#84002712) | NJ 517; 40°40′40″N 74°45′06″W | Oldwick | |
| 41 | Lambertville Historic District | Lambertville Historic District | June 30, 1983 (#83001602) | NJ 29 and NJ 179; 40°21′58″N 74°56′34″W | Lambertville | |
| 42 | Lambertville House | Lambertville House | September 6, 1978 (#78001768) | 32 Bridge Street; 40°21′57″N 74°56′44″W | Lambertville | |
| 43 | Lansdown | Lansdown | November 2, 1979 (#79001497) | Northeast of Pittstown on Hamden Road; 40°36′22″N 74°54′24″W | Lansdowne | |
| 44 | Lebanon Historic District | Lebanon Historic District | August 26, 2009 (#09000652) | Main Street, Cherry Street, Brunswick Avenue, Maple Street, High Street; 40°38′26″N 74°50′05″W | Lebanon | |
| 45 | Little York Historic District | Little York Historic District | August 4, 1988 (#88001207) | CR 614 and Sweet Hollow Road; 40°36′47″N 75°04′35″W | Little York | |
| 46 | Locktown Baptist Church | Locktown Baptist Church | February 15, 1974 (#74001166) | 323 Locktown-Sergeantsville Road, Locktown; 40°29′06″N 74°58′14″W | Delaware Township | |
| 47 | Locktown–Sergeantsville Road truss bridge over Plum Brook | Locktown–Sergeantsville Road truss bridge over Plum Brook | March 24, 2025 (#100011562) | Locktown–Sergeantsville Road at Plum Brook; 40°28′07″N 74°57′28″W | Delaware Township | Part of the Historic Bridges of Delaware Township, Hunterdon County, New Jersey MPS |
| 48 | Lower Creek Road truss bridge over the Wickecheoke Creek | Lower Creek Road truss bridge over the Wickecheoke Creek | May 23, 2025 (#100011840) | Lower Creek Road; 40°25′19″N 74°58′47″W | Delaware Township | Part of the Historic Bridges of Delaware Township, Hunterdon County, New Jersey MPS |
| 49 | James W. Marshall House | James W. Marshall House | December 18, 1970 (#70000386) | 60 Bridge Street; 40°21′58″N 74°56′39″W | Lambertville | |
| 50 | David McKinney Mill | David McKinney Mill | January 8, 1974 (#74001162) | 56 Main Street; 40°38′10″N 74°54′48″W | Clinton | Part of the Red Mill Museum Village |
| 51 | Mechlin's Corner Tavern | Mechlin's Corner Tavern | November 1, 1974 (#74001164) | Northwest of Pittstown; 40°36′39″N 74°59′17″W | Mechlings Corner | |
| 52 | Milford Historic District | Milford Historic District | April 21, 2025 (#100006744) | Bridge, Carpenter, Church, Spring Garden, Green, and Maple Streets; 40°34′06″N 75°05′42″W | Milford | Includes Upper Black Eddy–Milford Bridge |
| 53 | Miller Farmstead | Miller Farmstead | September 11, 1989 (#88002118) | NJ 57; 40°47′09″N 74°53′42″W | Lebanon Township | Historic farm complex and stone arch bridge. Primarily in Mansfield Township, Warren County. |
| 54 | Mount Airy Historic District | Mount Airy Historic District | November 13, 1989 (#89001943) | Roughly bounded by NJ 179, Rt. 605, Rt. 603, and Rt. 601, Mount Airy; 40°23′57″N 74°54′17″W | West Amwell Township | |
| 55 | Mount Pleasant Historic District | Mount Pleasant Historic District | November 16, 1987 (#87002012) | CR 519 and Rick Road; 40°34′54″N 75°03′09″W | Mount Pleasant | |
| 56 | Mount Salem Methodist Episcopal Church | Mount Salem Methodist Episcopal Church | May 19, 1988 (#88000592) | CR 579; 40°36′19″N 74°59′00″W | Alexandria Township | |
| 57 | Mountainville Historic District | Mountainville Historic District | December 7, 1993 (#93001360) | Main Street, Guinea Hollow, Saw Mill, Rockaway Creek and Philhower Roads; 40°41′29″N 74°48′33″W | Mountainville | |
| 58 | M. C. Mulligan & Sons Quarry | M. C. Mulligan & Sons Quarry | August 30, 1994 (#94001010) | 56 Main Street; 40°38′12″N 74°54′49″W | Clinton | Part of the Red Mill Museum Village |
| 59 | Music Hall | Music Hall | May 7, 1982 (#82003278) | 23 W. Main St. 40°38′01″N 74°54′50″W | Clinton | |
| 60 | New Hampton Historic District | New Hampton Historic District | April 6, 1998 (#98000257) | Roughly along Musconetcong River Road, and Rymon Road; 40°43′05″N 74°57′49″W | New Hampton | Includes New Hampton Pony Pratt Truss Bridge |
| 61 | New Hampton Pony Pratt Truss Bridge | New Hampton Pony Pratt Truss Bridge | July 26, 1977 (#77000877) | Shoddy Mill Road over the Musconetcong River; 40°43′14″N 74°57′49″W | New Hampton | Extends into Warren County, Rymon Road, Washington Township |
| 62 | New Market–Linvale–Snydertown Historic District | New Market–Linvale–Snydertown Historic District | February 12, 1998 (#98000097) | Roughly along NJ 31, Linvale, Snydertown, and Woodsville Roads, Linvale and Snydertown; 40°23′46″N 74°50′05″W | East Amwell Township, West Amwell Township | |
| 63 | Old Grandin Library | Old Grandin Library | November 1, 1974 (#74001163) | 12 E. Main St. 40°38′13″N 74°54′34″W | Clinton | |
| 64 | Old Mill Road truss bridge over the Wickecheoke Creek | Old Mill Road truss bridge over the Wickecheoke Creek | May 23, 2025 (#100011839) | Old Mill Road; 40°27′53″N 74°58′35″W | Delaware Township | Part of the Historic Bridges of Delaware Township, Hunterdon County, New Jersey MPS |
| 65 | Old Stone Presbyterian Church | Old Stone Presbyterian Church | January 25, 2018 (#100002053) | Corner of Oak Summit Road and County Route 519; 40°32′34″N 75°00′20″W | Kingwood Township | Known as the Old Stone Church |
| 66 | Oldwick Historic District | Oldwick Historic District | November 14, 1988 (#88002153) | Roughly along County Route 517, Church, King, James, Joliet and William Streets; 40°40′22″N 74°44′57″W | Oldwick | |
| 67 | Palatine Road Bridge over a minor tributary of the Lamington River | Palatine Road Bridge over a minor tributary of the Lamington River | December 12, 2002 (#02001508) | Palatine Road, junction with Homestead and Cold Spring Roads; 40°41′59″N 74°44′48″W | Tewksbury Township | Part of the Historic Bridges of Tewksbury Township, Hunterdon County, New Jersey MPS |
| 68 | Peck's Ferry Bridge | Peck's Ferry Bridge | November 12, 1999 (#99001313) | Locktown-Flemington Road over Plum Brook; 40°29′03″N 74°56′36″W | Delaware Township | |
| 69 | Perryville Tavern | Perryville Tavern | July 15, 1977 (#77000874) | 167 Perryville Road; 40°37′59″N 74°58′12″W | Perryville | |
| 70 | Pittstown Historic District | Pittstown Historic District | October 11, 1990 (#90001483) | Pittstown Road and adjacent portions of Race Street and Quakertown Road, Franklin and Alexandra Townships; 40°34′54″N 74°57′33″W | Pittstown | |
| 71 | Pleasant Valley Historic District | Pleasant Valley Historic District | June 14, 1991 (#91000676) | Centered on junction of Pleasant Valley Road with Woodens Lane and Hunter Road; 40°20′18″N 74°53′44″W | West Amwell Township | Extends into Mercer County |
| 72 | Potterstown Rural Historic District | Potterstown Rural Historic District | July 2, 1992 (#92000806) | Along Potterstown and Halls Mill Roads and I-78, Readington and Clinton Townships; 40°38′47″N 74°47′05″W | Potterstown | |
| 73 | Pottersville Village Historic District | Pottersville Village Historic District | September 18, 1990 (#90001475) | Properties fronting on Black River, Pottersville, McCann Mill and Hacklebarney Roads, Fairmount Road East and High Street; 40°42′52″N 74°43′15″W | Pottersville | Extends into Somerset and Morris Counties |
| 74 | Prallsville District | Prallsville District | June 27, 1979 (#79001498) | NJ 29; 40°24′34″N 74°59′09″W | Prallsville | |
| 75 | Pursley's Ferry Historic District | Pursley's Ferry Historic District | October 8, 1980 (#80002495) | Old River Road at Church Road; 40°34′36″N 75°11′28″W | Holland Township | |
| 76 | Quakertown Historic District | Quakertown Historic District | August 23, 1990 (#90001242) | Roughly bounded by Quakertown, Cherryville Roads, Quaker Lane, and Locust Grove Road; 40°33′53″N 74°56′41″W | Quakertown | Also known as Quaker Meeting, includes Quaker Meeting House |
| 77 | Raritan–Readington South Branch Historic District | Raritan–Readington South Branch Historic District | January 26, 1990 (#89002410) | River Road from NJ 31 to US 202; 40°31′33″N 74°50′21″W | Raritan Township, Readington Township | Includes John Reading Farmstead |
| 78 | Raven Rock Historic District | Raven Rock Historic District | November 10, 2015 (#15000774) | NJ 29 and Quarry Road, Raven Rock; 40°24′40″N 75°02′02″W | Delaware Township | |
| 79 | Raven Rock Road Bridge | Raven Rock Road Bridge | October 4, 2016 (#16000691) | Rosemont-Raven Rock Road, Raven Rock; 40°24′59″N 75°01′03″W | Delaware Township | Part of the Historic Bridges of Delaware Township, Hunterdon County, New Jersey MPS |
| 80 | John Reading Farmstead | John Reading Farmstead | November 21, 1978 (#78001767) | 76 River Road; 40°31′30″N 74°50′13″W | Raritan Township | |
| 81 | Readingsburg Historic District | Readingsburg Historic District | March 3, 2000 (#00000176) | Cokesbury and Stone Mill Roads, CR 639; 40°40′54″N 74°52′40″W | Readingsburg | |
| 82 | Readington Village Historic District | Readington Village Historic District | June 24, 1991 (#91000827) | Readington, Hillcrest, Centerville and Brookview Roads; 40°34′06″N 74°44′13″W | Readington | Includes Readington Reformed Church |
| 83 | Reaville Historic District | Reaville Historic District | May 2, 2002 (#02000433) | Old York, Amwell, Barley Sheaf, Kuhl, and Manners roads 40°28′41″N 74°49′19″W | Reaville | |
| 84 | Riegel Ridge Community Center | Riegel Ridge Community Center | June 7, 1996 (#96000656) | County Route 519, Riegel Ridge; 40°36′34″N 75°07′00″W | Holland Township | |
| 85 | Ringoes Historic District | Ringoes Historic District | December 20, 1999 (#99001544) | Old York, John Ringo, Wertsville and Boss Roads, and Larison Lane, Ringoes; 40°25′56″N 74°52′00″W | East Amwell Township | |
| 86 | Rockhill Agricultural Historic District | Rockhill Agricultural Historic District | April 5, 1984 (#84002717) | North of Pittstown on SR 513; 40°35′59″N 74°57′12″W | Union Township | |
| 87 | Rosemont Rural Agricultural District | Rosemont Rural Agricultural District | June 18, 2010 (#10000354) | County Routes 519 and 604; Sanford Rd.; Covered Bridge Rd. 40°26′09″N 74°58′35″W | Delaware Township | |
| 88 | Sand Brook Historic District | Sand Brook Historic District | July 17, 2013 (#13000497) | County Route 523, Sand Brook-Headquarters & Britton Roads; 40°28′07″N 74°55′01″W | Sand Brook | |
| 89 | Sandbrook–Headquarters Road stone arch bridge over a tributary of the Third Neshanic River | Sandbrook–Headquarters Road stone arch bridge over a tributary of the Third Neshanic River | March 17, 2025 (#100011523) | Sandbrook–Headquarters Road at a tributary of the Third Neshanic River; 40°26′55″N 74°54′50″W | Delaware Township | Part of the Historic Bridges of Delaware Township, Hunterdon County, New Jersey MPS |
| 90 | Sergeantsville Historic District | Sergeantsville Historic District | December 2, 2009 (#09000972) | County Routes 523 and 604, Lambert Rd., Delaware Dr. 40°26′45″N 74°56′39″W | Delaware Township | |
| 91 | St. Thomas Episcopal Church | St. Thomas Episcopal Church | July 21, 1977 (#77000878) | Southwest of Pittstown on Sky Manor Road; 40°33′38″N 74°59′22″W | Alexandria Township | |
| 92 | Stanton Historic Rural District | Stanton Historic Rural District | August 10, 1990 (#90001225) | Junction of Stanton and Mountain Roads, Stanton; 40°34′34″N 74°50′03″W | Readington Township | |
| 93 | Stone Sign Post Road Bridge over Plum Brook | Stone Sign Post Road Bridge over Plum Brook | October 4, 2016 (#16000692) | Stone Sign Post Road; 40°29′26″N 74°56′19″W | Delaware Township | Part of the Historic Bridges of Delaware Township, Hunterdon County, New Jersey MPS |
| 94 | Strimple's Mill Road Bridge over Lockatong Creek | Strimple's Mill Road Bridge over Lockatong Creek | October 4, 2016 (#16000693) | Strimple's Mill Road; 40°26′14″N 75°00′42″W | Delaware Township | Part of the Historic Bridges of Delaware Township, Hunterdon County, New Jersey MPS |
| 95 | Taylor's Mill Historic District | Taylor's Mill Historic District | June 11, 1992 (#92000636) | Taylor's Mill Road and Rockaway Road; 40°39′48″N 74°46′06″W | Readington Township | |
| 96 | Thatcher House | Thatcher House | December 4, 2020 (#100005851) | 255 Ridge Road; 40°32′16″N 75°01′24″W | Kingwood Township | |
| 97 | Turner–Chew–Carhart Farm | Turner–Chew–Carhart Farm | August 11, 1977 (#77000875) | Northwest of Clinton on Van Syckles Road; 40°39′12″N 74°57′27″W | Union Township | |
| 98 | John Van Syckle House | John Van Syckle House | April 2, 2012 (#10000814) | 195 Rummel Rd. 40°35′52″N 75°04′30″W | Holland Township | |
| 99 | Van Syckel Corner District | Van Syckel Corner District | November 8, 1979 (#79001495) | Van Syckels Corner and Norton Roads; 40°38′58″N 74°58′38″W | Union Township | |
| 100 | Christoffel Vought Farmstead | Christoffel Vought Farmstead | January 16, 2008 (#07001403) | East of Grey Rock Road, 600 feet (180 m) north of the junction with NJ 31. 40°38′36″N 74°53′54″W | Annandale | |
| 101 | Wertsville Historic District | Wertsville Historic District | October 5, 2000 (#00001150) | Wertsville and Lindbergh Roads; 40°26′54″N 74°47′46″W | East Amwell Township | |
| 102 | Whitehouse Station | Whitehouse Station | June 22, 1984 (#84002726) | Main Street, Whitehouse Station; 40°36′55″N 74°46′16″W | Readington Township | |
| 103 | Whitehouse–Mechanicsville Historic District | Whitehouse–Mechanicsville Historic District | March 17, 2015 (#15000093) | Old New Jersey Route 28, Mill, Lamington and School Roads; 40°37′17″N 74°45′34″W | Readington Township | |
| 104 | Worman Road stone arch bridge over Shoppon's Run | Worman Road stone arch bridge over Shoppon's Run | September 29, 2025 (#100012318) | Worman Road at Shoppon's Run; 40°25′34″N 74°57′49″W | Delaware Township | Part of the Historic Bridges of Delaware Township, Hunterdon County, New Jersey MPS |
| 105 | Yard Road stone arch bridge over a tributary of Sand Brook | Yard Road stone arch bridge over a tributary of Sand Brook | March 17, 2025 (#100011526) | Yard Road at a tributary of Sand Brook; 40°27′29″N 74°53′52″W | Delaware Township | Part of the Historic Bridges of Delaware Township, Hunterdon County, New Jersey MPS |
