= Mechlin's Corner Tavern =

- U.S. National Register of Historic Places
- New Jersey Register of Historic Places
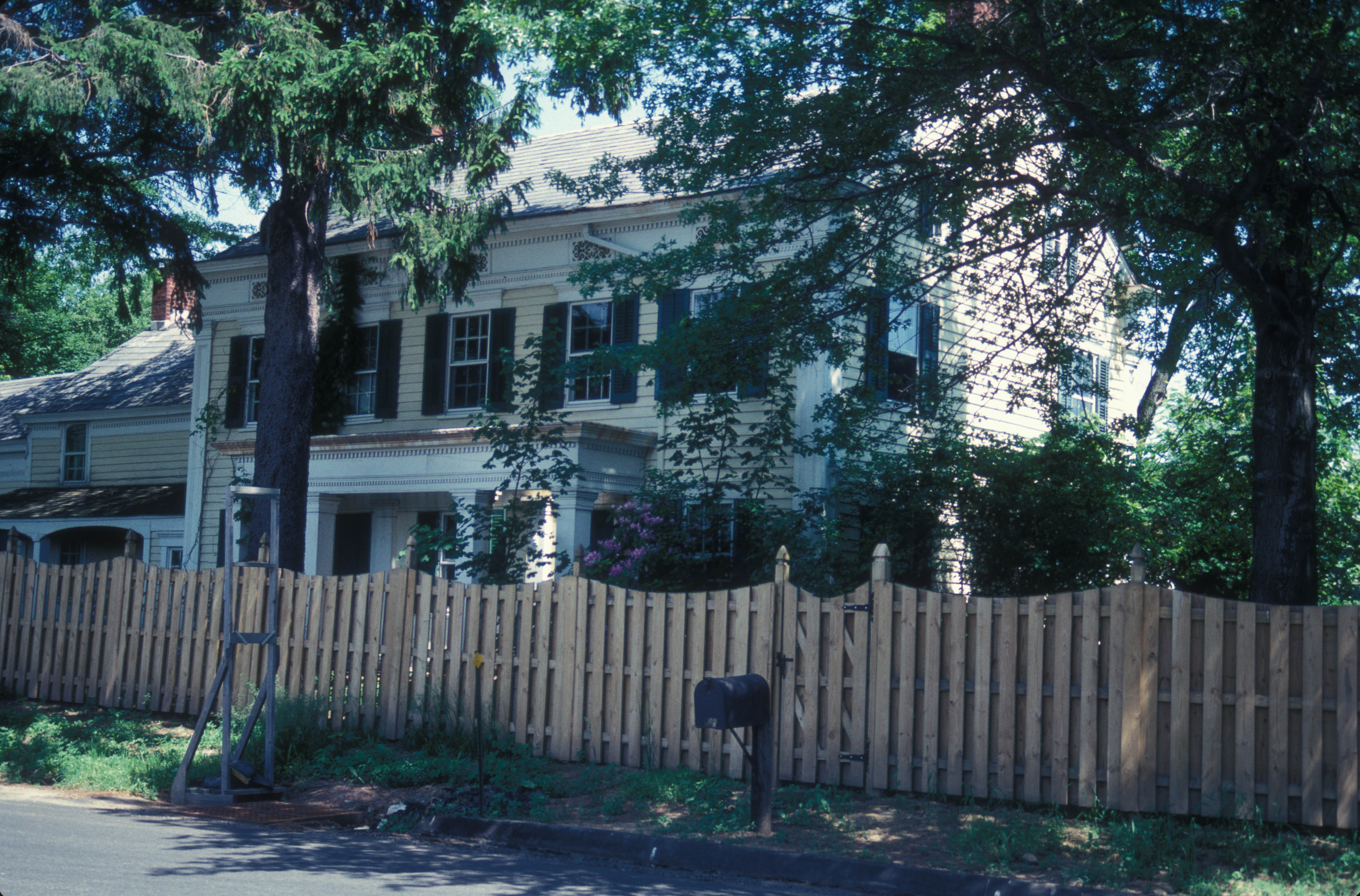

- Location within Hunterdon County, New Jersey Location within New Jersey Location within the United States
- Location: Intersection of County Route 625 (Mechlin Corner Road) and County Route 579 (Bloomsbury Road); Mechlings Corner, New Jersey
- Nearest city: Pittstown, New Jersey
- Coordinates: 40°36′39″N 74°59′17″W
- Area: 2 acres (0.81 ha)
- Built: 1830
- Architectural style: Greek Revival
- NRHP reference No.: 74001164
- NJRHP No.: 1635

Significant dates
- Added to NRHP: November 1, 1974
- Designated NJRHP: July 1, 1974

Mechlin's Corner Tavern, also known as Peter Mechling's Corner Tavern, is a historic building located at the intersection of County Route 625 (Mechlin Corner Road) and County Route 579 (Bloomsbury Road) in the Mechlings Corner, New Jersey section of Union Township, Hunterdon County, New Jersey and near Pittstown. It was added to the National Register of Historic Places on November 1, 1974, for its significance in architecture and commerce.

== History ==
There was a tavern at this site, then owned by Jonathan Robeson, in 1752 or earlier. The nearby Van Syckel's Tavern dates to 1763. The current building was likely built c. 1830 by Peter Mechling. He retired in 1844 and sold the tavern to his son William Mechling. In 1890, William deeded it to his son Hiram Mechling. Hiram's death in 1934 ended tavern operation. It is now a private home.

== Description ==
The tavern is an example of Greek Revival architecture. The main part of the tavern is a two and one-half story frame building with a gable roof. It has a one and one-half story extension. The porch has four large square columns.

== See also ==
- National Register of Historic Places listings in Hunterdon County, New Jersey
- Perryville Tavern
