= Mountainville =

Mountainville may refer to:

- Mountainville, New Jersey
- Mountainville, New York
