= Bray–Hoffman House =

- U.S. National Register of Historic Places
- New Jersey Register of Historic Places
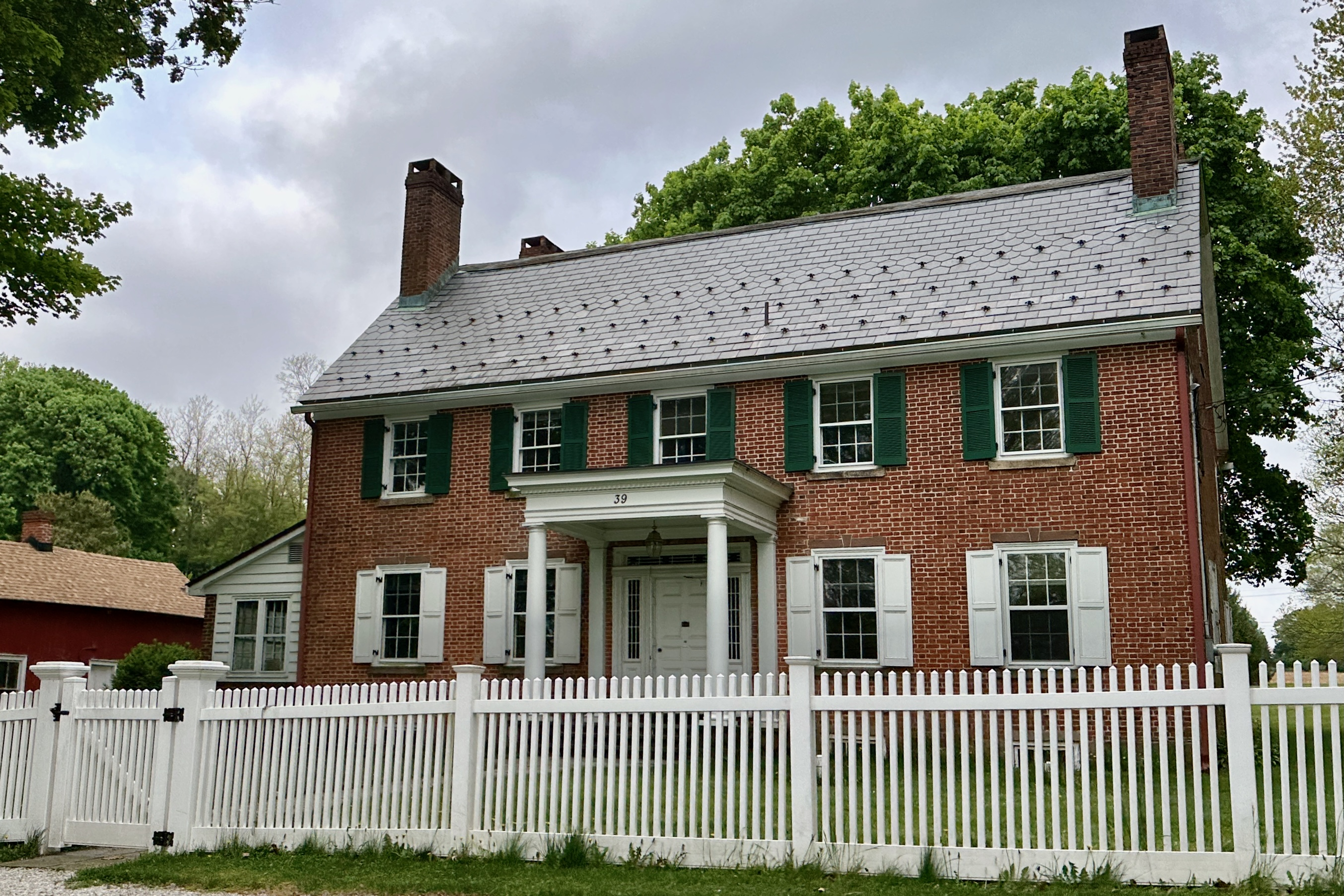
- Bray–Hoffman House in 2024

- Location within Hunterdon County, New Jersey Location within New Jersey Location within the United States
- Location: 39 Sand Hill Road, Clinton Township, New Jersey
- Coordinates: 40°38′13.5″N 74°51′30.8″W
- Built: c. 1800
- Architectural style: Federal
- NRHP reference No.: 73001104
- NJRHP No.: 1576

Significant dates
- Added to NRHP: January 25, 1973
- Designated NJRHP: May 1, 1972

The Bray–Hoffman House is a historic Federal style brick house located at 39 Sand Hill Road near the community of Annandale in Clinton Township of Hunterdon County, New Jersey, United States. Built around 1800 by John Bray, it was added to the National Register of Historic Places on January 25, 1973, for its significance in architecture and military history.

The two and one-half story house has a gambrel roof. The brickwork on the east and north sides uses Flemish bond, the other sides use English garden wall bond. According to the nomination form, it is the third oldest brick house in the county. John Bray is noted for fighting alongside his father and his son at the Battle of Monmouth during the American Revolutionary War.

== See also ==
- National Register of Historic Places listings in Hunterdon County, New Jersey
