= St. Thomas Episcopal Church (Pittstown, New Jersey) =

Historic church in New Jersey, United States

- U.S. National Register of Historic Places
- New Jersey Register of Historic Places
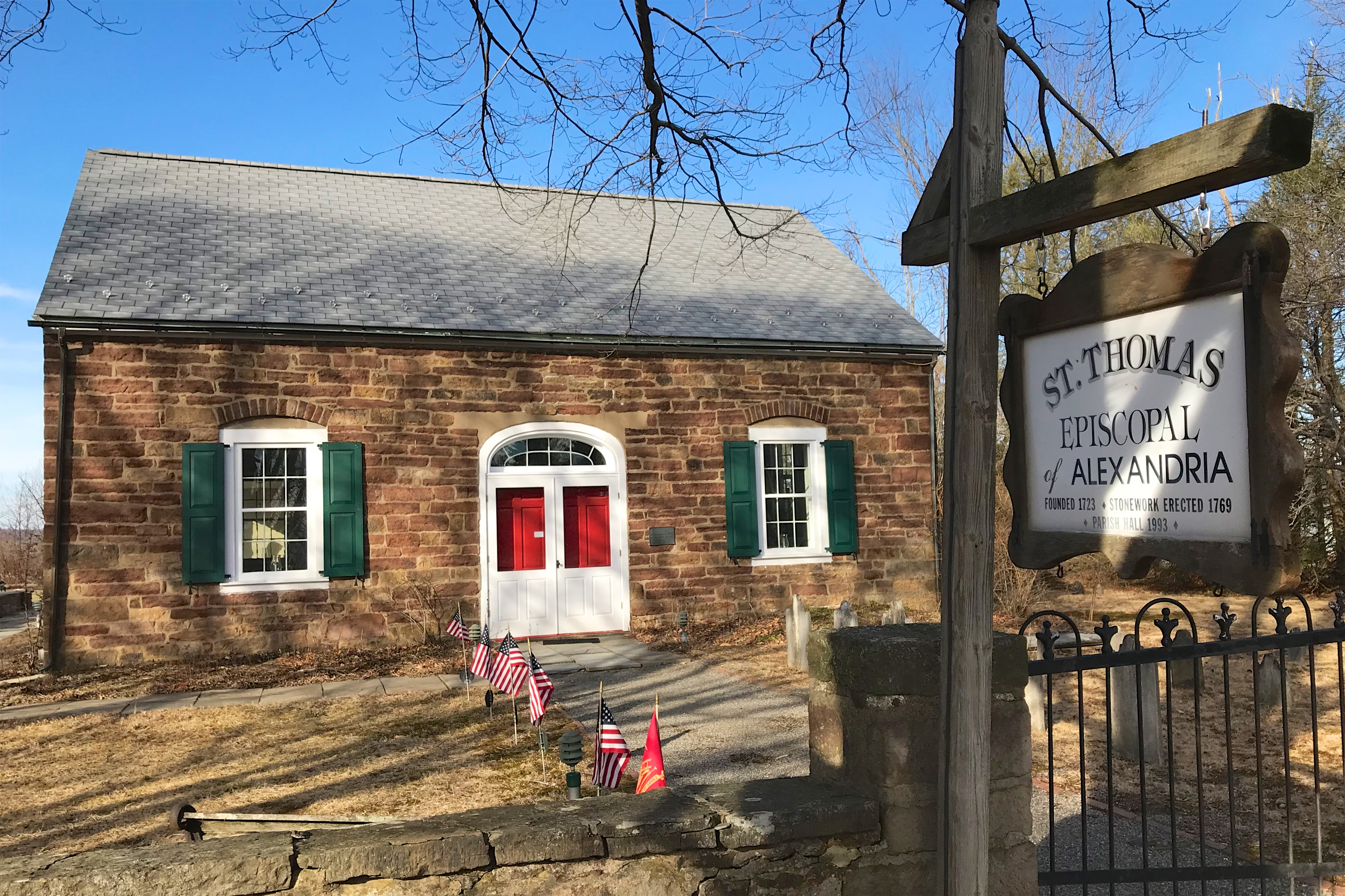

- Location within Hunterdon County, New Jersey
- Nearest city: Pittstown, New Jersey
- Coordinates: 40°33′38″N 74°59′22″W
- Area: 2.5 acres (1.0 ha)
- Built: 1790
- NRHP reference No.: 77000878
- NJRHP No.: 1563

Significant dates
- Added to NRHP: July 21, 1977
- Designated NJRHP: October 12, 1976

St. Thomas Episcopal Church is a historic church in Alexandria Township in Hunterdon County, New Jersey near Pittstown and is one of the oldest churches in the county. It was added to the National Register of Historic Places on July 21, 1977, for its significance in architecture and religion. The church was featured as a set in Sarah Jessica Parker's movie debut, the 1983 film Somewhere Tomorrow.

It is a congregation of the Episcopal Diocese of New Jersey.

== History and description ==
The present one and one-half story stone church replaced a log or frame church that was built as early as the 1720s. That church was replaced in 1768 by the present church's stone walls, though the church was not completed until after the American Revolution, around 1790. It was repaired in 1875 and remains in use.

== Gallery ==
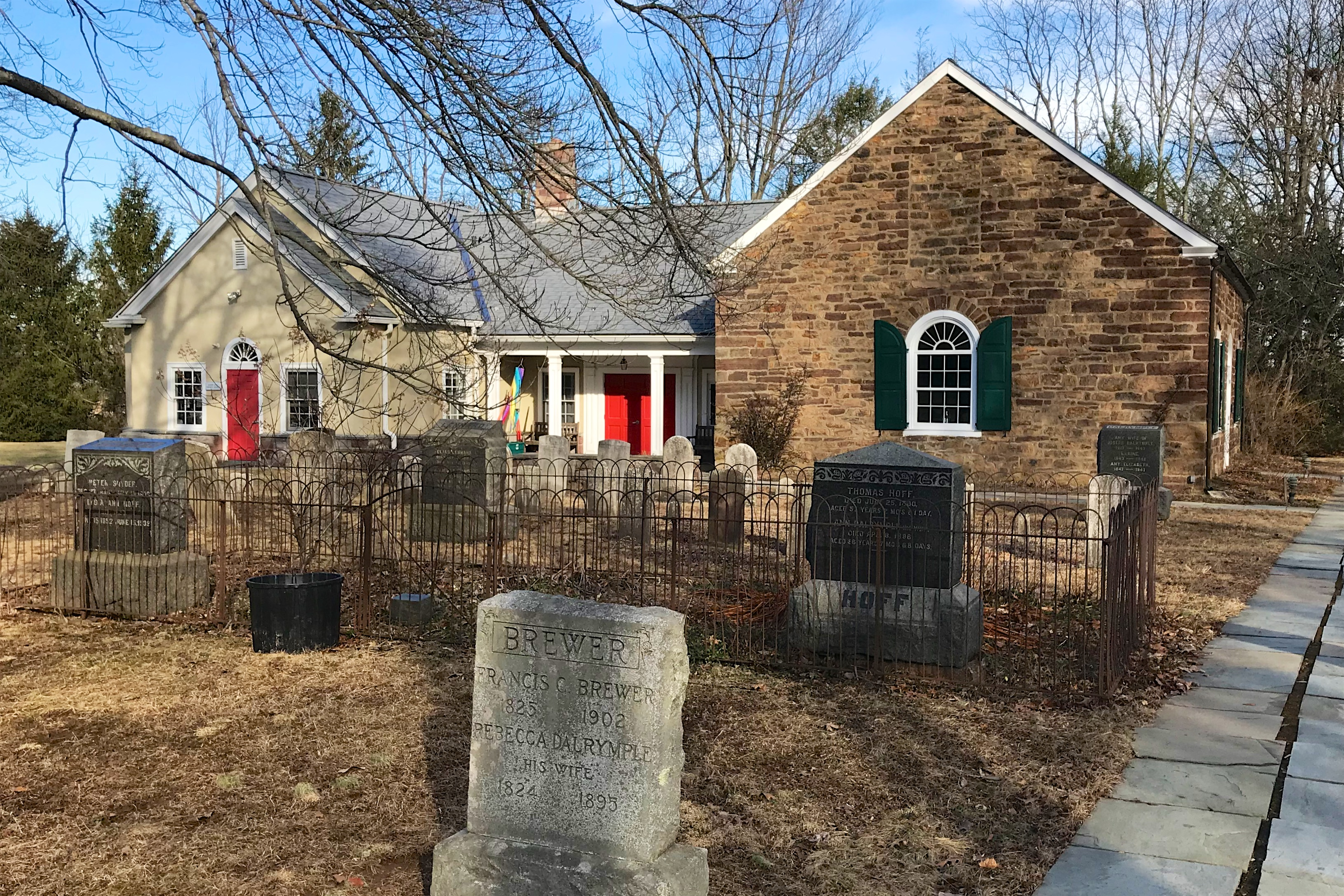
Church and cemetery

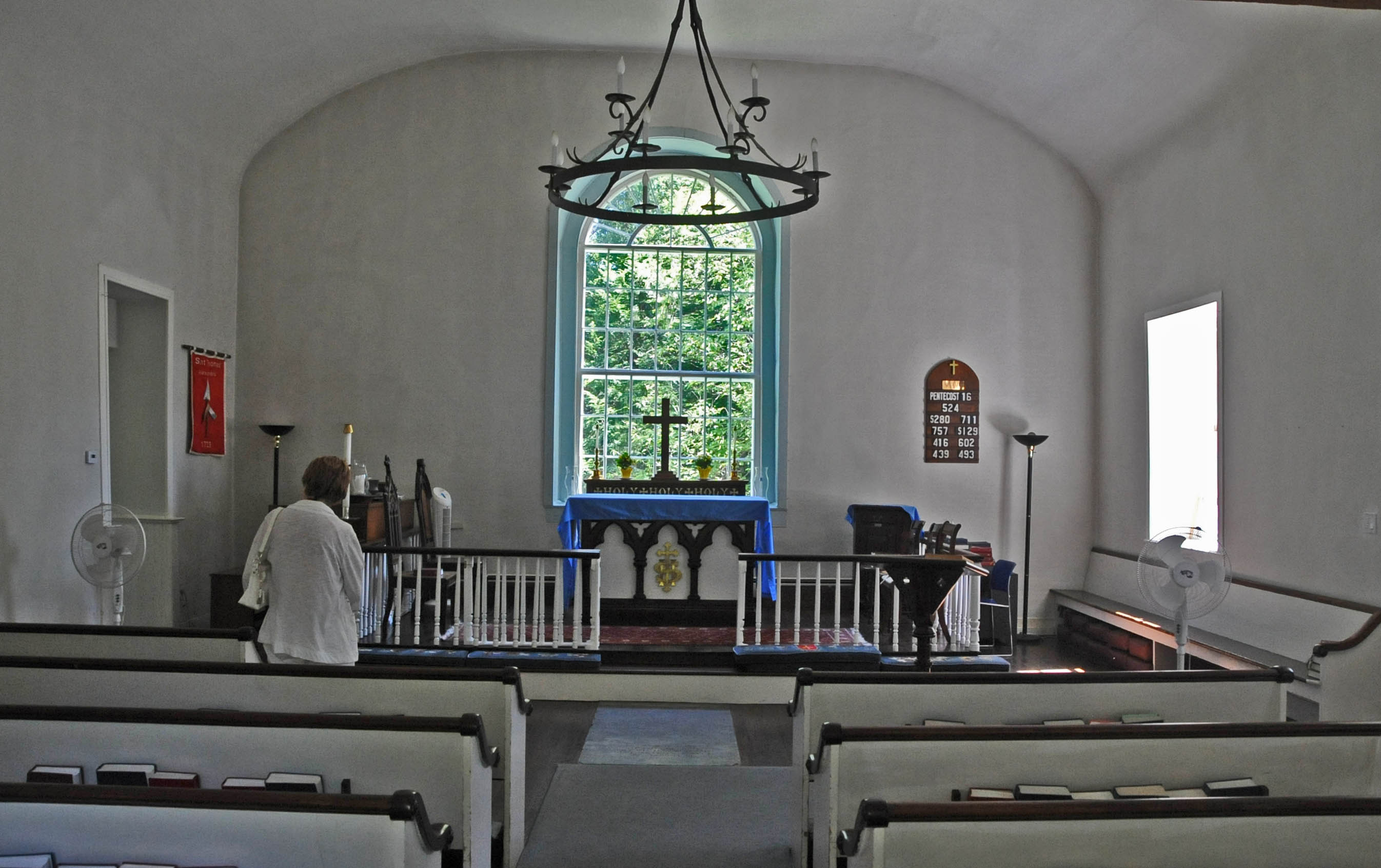
Interior

== See also ==
- National Register of Historic Places listings in Hunterdon County, New Jersey
