= Carrell–Kurzenberger Farmstead =

- U.S. National Register of Historic Places
- U.S. Historic district
- New Jersey Register of Historic Places
- Carrell–Kurzenberger Farmstead in 2026

- Location within Hunterdon County, New Jersey Location within New Jersey Location within the United States
- Location: 51 Lambert Road, Delaware Township, Hunterdon County, New Jersey
- Coordinates: 40°27′4.5″N 74°55′18.5″W
- Area: 119.8 acres (48.5 ha)
- NRHP reference No.: 100013430
- NJRHP No.: 6061

Significant dates
- Added to NRHP: September 28, 2026
- Designated NJRHP: August 5, 2026

The Carrell–Kurzenberger Farmstead, also known as the John A. Carrell Homestead, is a historic 119.8-acre (48.5 ha) farm located at 51 Lambert Road in Delaware Township in Hunterdon County, New Jersey, United States. The farmstead was added to the National Register of Historic Places on September 28, 2026, for its significance in agriculture and architecture. The historic district has eight contributing buildings, one contributing site, and two contributing structures.

Barn complex

== See also ==
- National Register of Historic Places listings in Hunterdon County, New Jersey
