= John Van Syckle House =

- U.S. National Register of Historic Places
- New Jersey Register of Historic Places
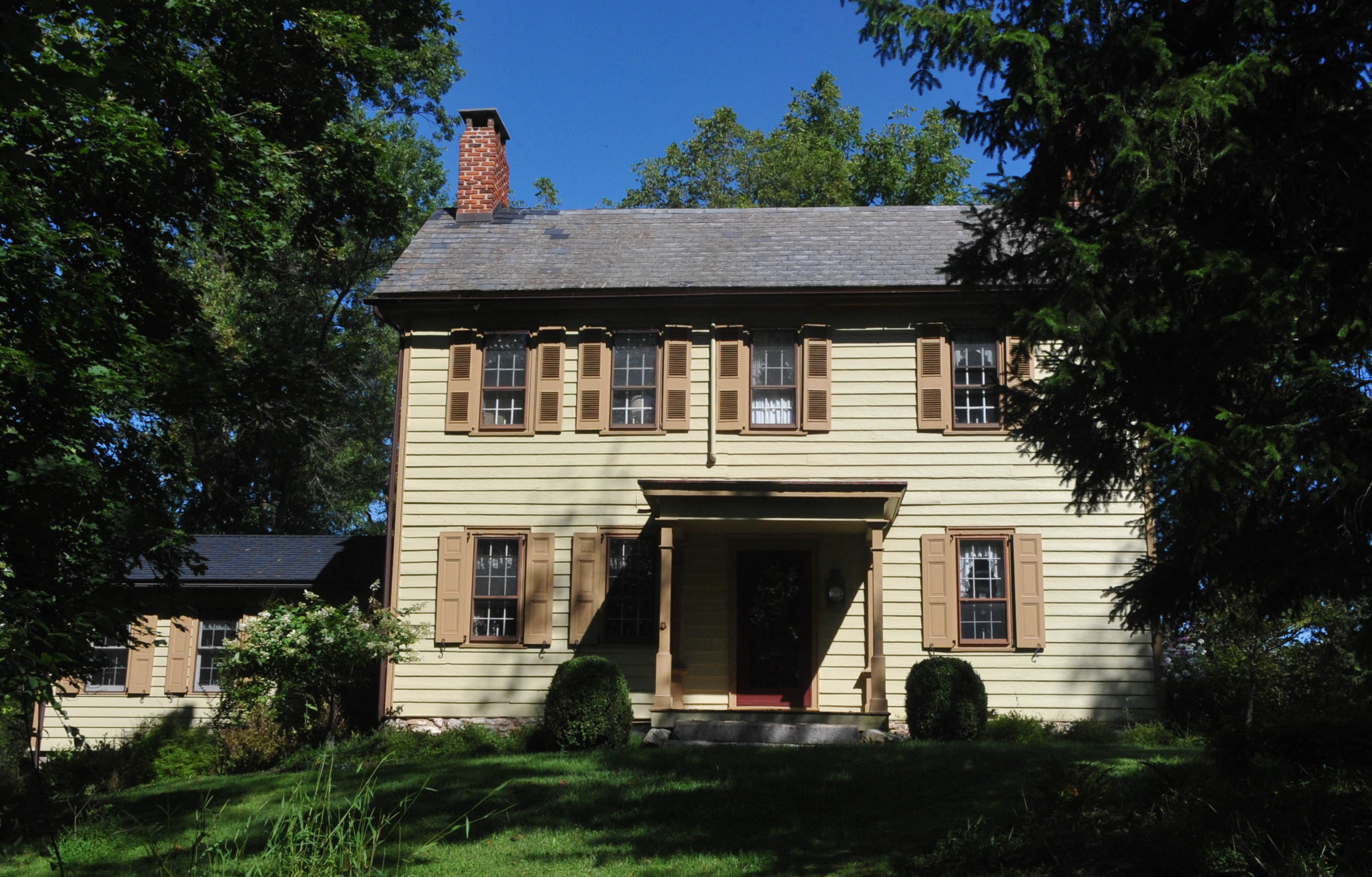

- Location within Hunterdon County, New Jersey Location within New Jersey Location within the United States
- Location: 195 Rummel Road, Holland Township, New Jersey
- Coordinates: 40°35′52.1″N 75°4′30.4″W
- Area: 2 acres (0.81 ha)
- Built: 1830
- Architectural style: Federal
- NRHP reference No.: 10000814
- NJRHP No.: 5110

Significant dates
- Added to NRHP: April 2, 2012
- Designated NJRHP: May 20, 2010

The John Van Syckle House is a historic Federal house located at 195 Rummel Road near Little York in Holland Township in Hunterdon County, New Jersey, United States. Built in 1830, it was added to the National Register of Historic Places on April 2, 2012, for its significance in architecture.

== See also ==
- National Register of Historic Places listings in Hunterdon County, New Jersey
