= Case-Dvoor Farmstead =

Historic house in New Jersey, United States

- U.S. National Register of Historic Places
- New Jersey Register of Historic Places
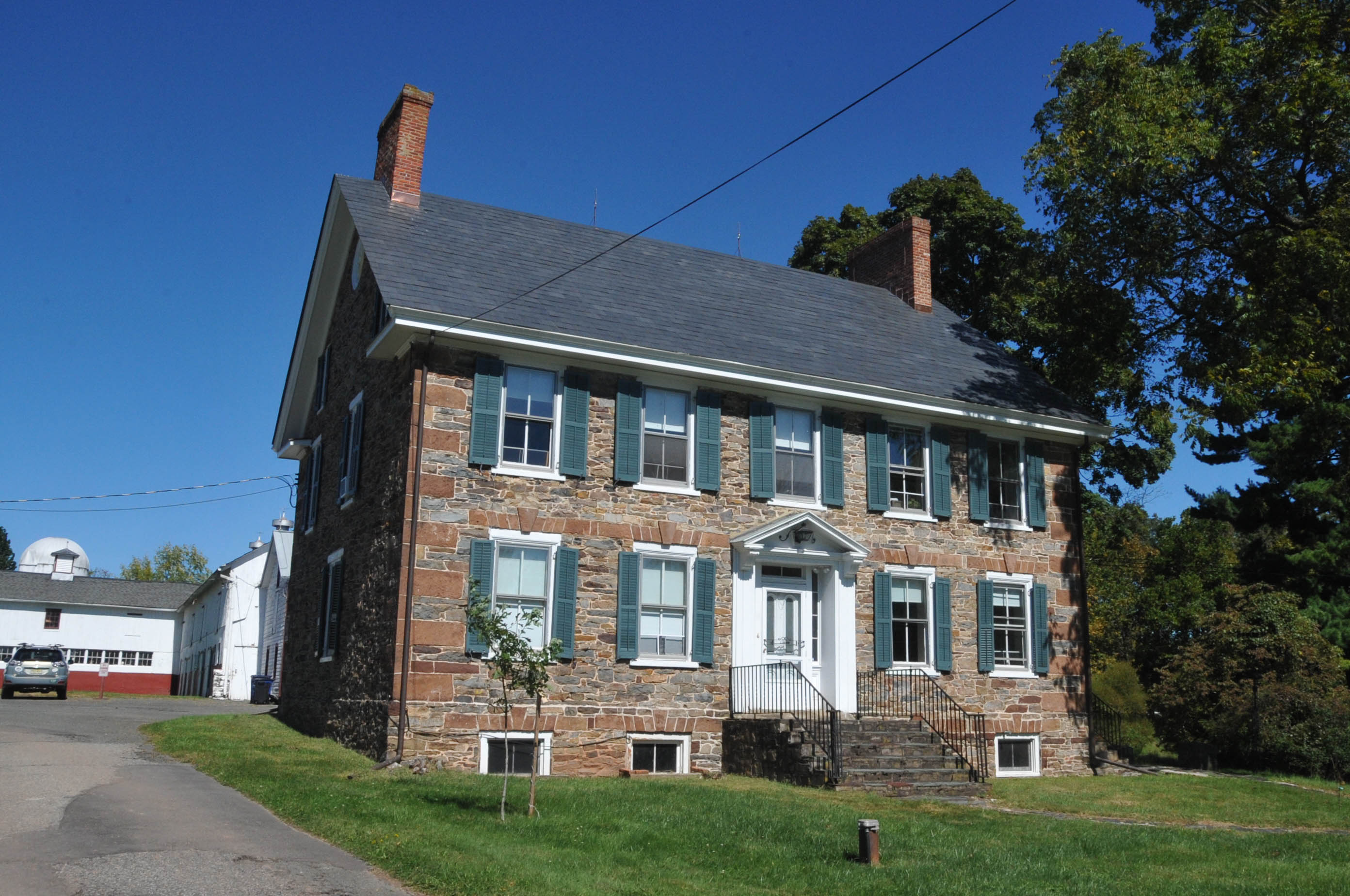
- Farmhouse

- Location within Hunterdon County, New Jersey Location within New Jersey Location within the United States
- Location: 111 Mine Street; Flemington, New Jersey
- Coordinates: 40°30′19″N 74°52′15″W
- Area: 40 acres (16 ha)
- Built: 1798 (house); other buildings in 19th & 20th centuries
- Architect: William Connor (house)
- Architectural style: Georgian, Italianate
- NRHP reference No.: 09001074
- NJRHP No.: 4442

Significant dates
- Added to NRHP: December 11, 2009
- Designated NJRHP: September 28, 2009

The Case-Dvoor Farmstead, or simply the Dvoor Farm, is a farm located on a 40-acre (16 ha) farm at 111 Mine Street in Raritan Township, near Flemington, of Hunterdon County, New Jersey. It was added to the National Register of Historic Places on December 11, 2009, for its significance in agriculture and architecture. It is now the headquarters of the Hunterdon Land Trust.

== History ==
In 1738, Johan Philip Kaes (Case), who had emigrated from German Palatinate to the Americas, purchased a 374-acre tract of land in western New Jersey from the sons of William Penn. After Johan's death, the land was divided among his descendants, and his son Philip Case eventually acquired the portion that would become the Case-Dvoor farmstead. In 1798, Johan's son Philip built a farmhouse, which was constructed in Georgian style by local mason William Connor. The Case family retained the property until 1860, at which time a court ordered that the property be sold to pay his debts. The property changed hands several times until it was purchased by Jacob Dvoor in 1920. Dvoor established a stock farm specializing in horses and dairy cows, and his brothers joined him in this operation. Jacob Dvoor made many improvements to the farm, including construction of the large horse barn in 1930. The Dvoor family was well-regarded for their agricultural contributions to the area's economy. In 1999, Herbert Dvoor, the last of the brothers maintaining the farm, sold the farmstead tract to the South Branch Watershed Association, which granted the farmstead and its surrounding acres to the Hunterdon Land Trust Alliance.

== Architecture ==
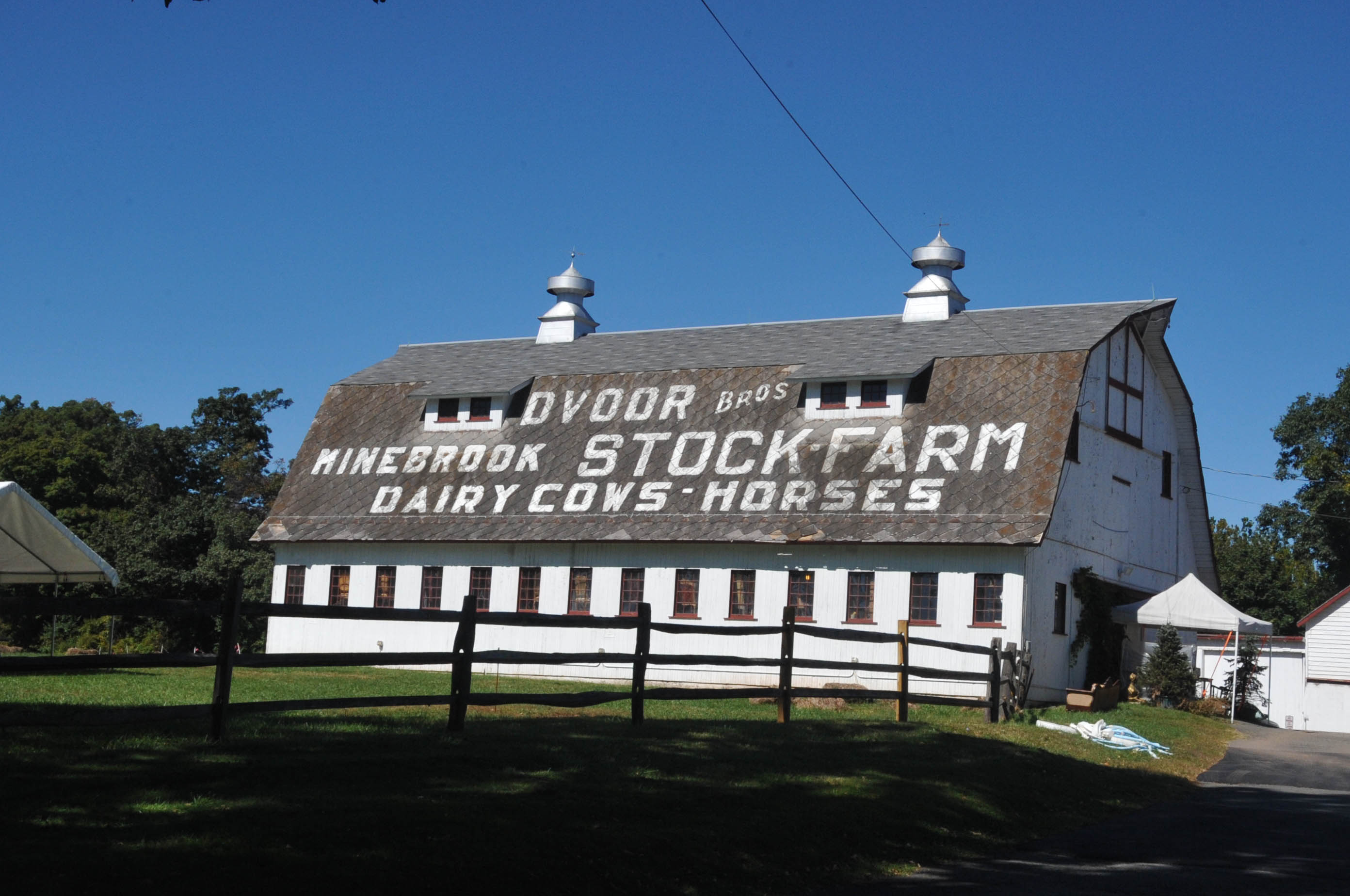
Horse barn

In the 19th and 20th centuries, the farmhouse was altered with Victorian and Colonial Revival elements, but it still exhibits much of its original Georgian style. The farmstead also includes a variety of outbuildings constructed in the 19th and 20th centuries, which provide an important record of the area's agricultural history. Structures included in the National Register of Historic Places listing are the house, two barns, wagon house/garage, office, equipment shed, and well.

== See also ==
- National Register of Historic Places listings in Hunterdon County, New Jersey
