= Dawlis Mill–Spring Mills Historic District =

- U.S. National Register of Historic Places
- U.S. Historic district
- New Jersey Register of Historic Places
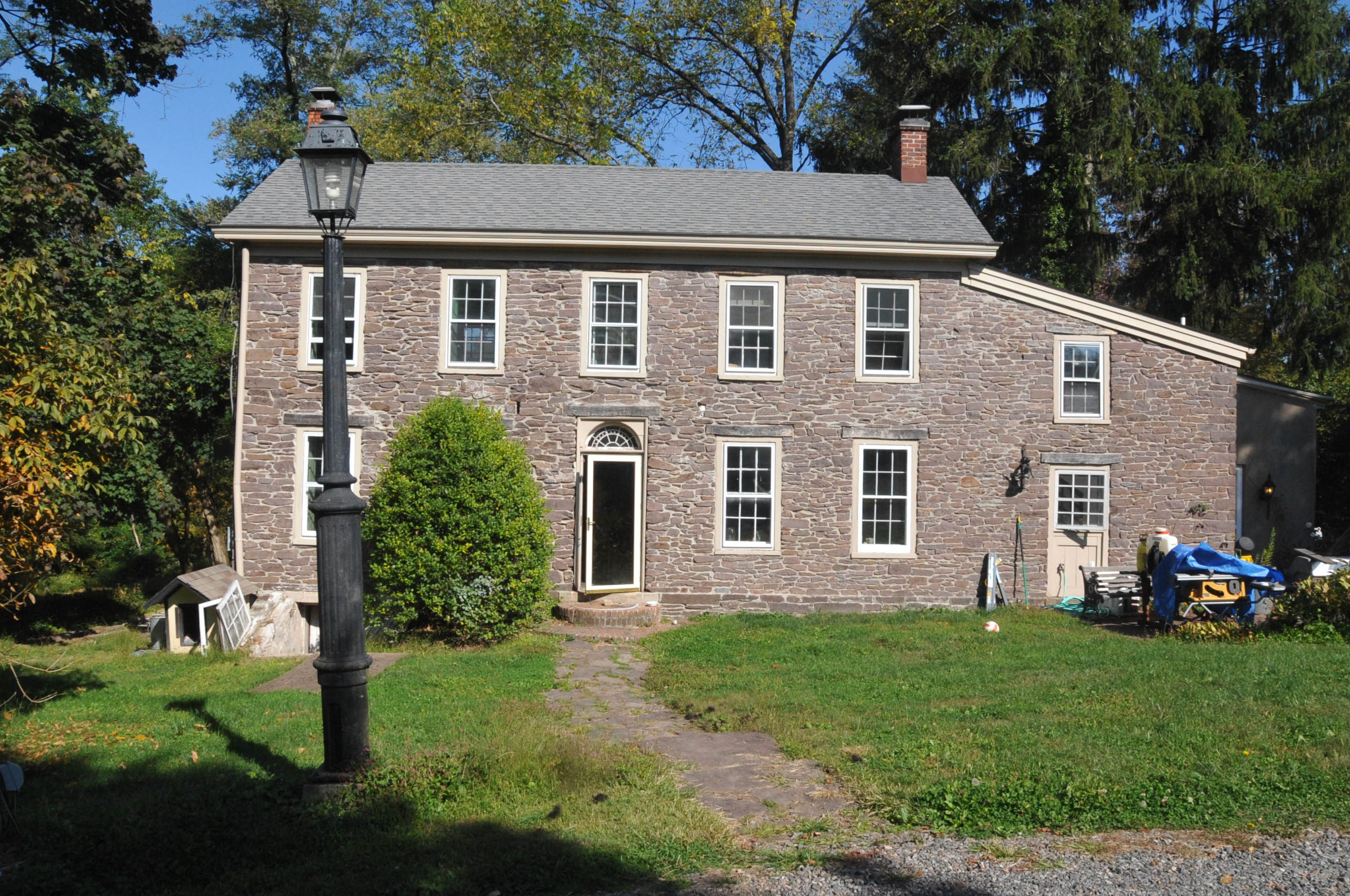
- Proprietor's Residence at Dawlis Mill

- Location within Hunterdon County, New Jersey Location within New Jersey Location within the United States
- Location: 525 and 530 NJ 31, East Amwell Township and West Amwell Township
- Area: 134 acres (54 ha)
- Architectural style: Georgian, Federal
- NRHP reference No.: 04001192
- NJRHP No.: 4230

Significant dates
- Added to NRHP: October 27, 2004
- Designated NJRHP: August 24, 1997

The Dawlis Mill–Spring Mills Historic District is a 134-acre (54 ha) historic district located at 525 and 530 NJ 31 in the townships of East Amwell and West Amwell in Hunterdon County, New Jersey, United States. It was added to the National Register of Historic Places on October 27, 2004, for its significance in architecture, commerce, industry, and settlement. The district includes six contributing buildings, two contributing sites, and one contributing object. The hamlet built around the Dawlis Mill was known as Spring Mills until around 1900.

== History and description ==
The ruins of a grist mill built in 1736 by William Dawlis contributes to the district. It was located on a small stream named the Clearwater Rill. The mill was documented by the Historic American Buildings Survey (HABS) in 1937. It collapsed sometime before 1976. The two-story stone Proprietor's Residence was built around 1830 by Nathan Price. It features Federal architecture.

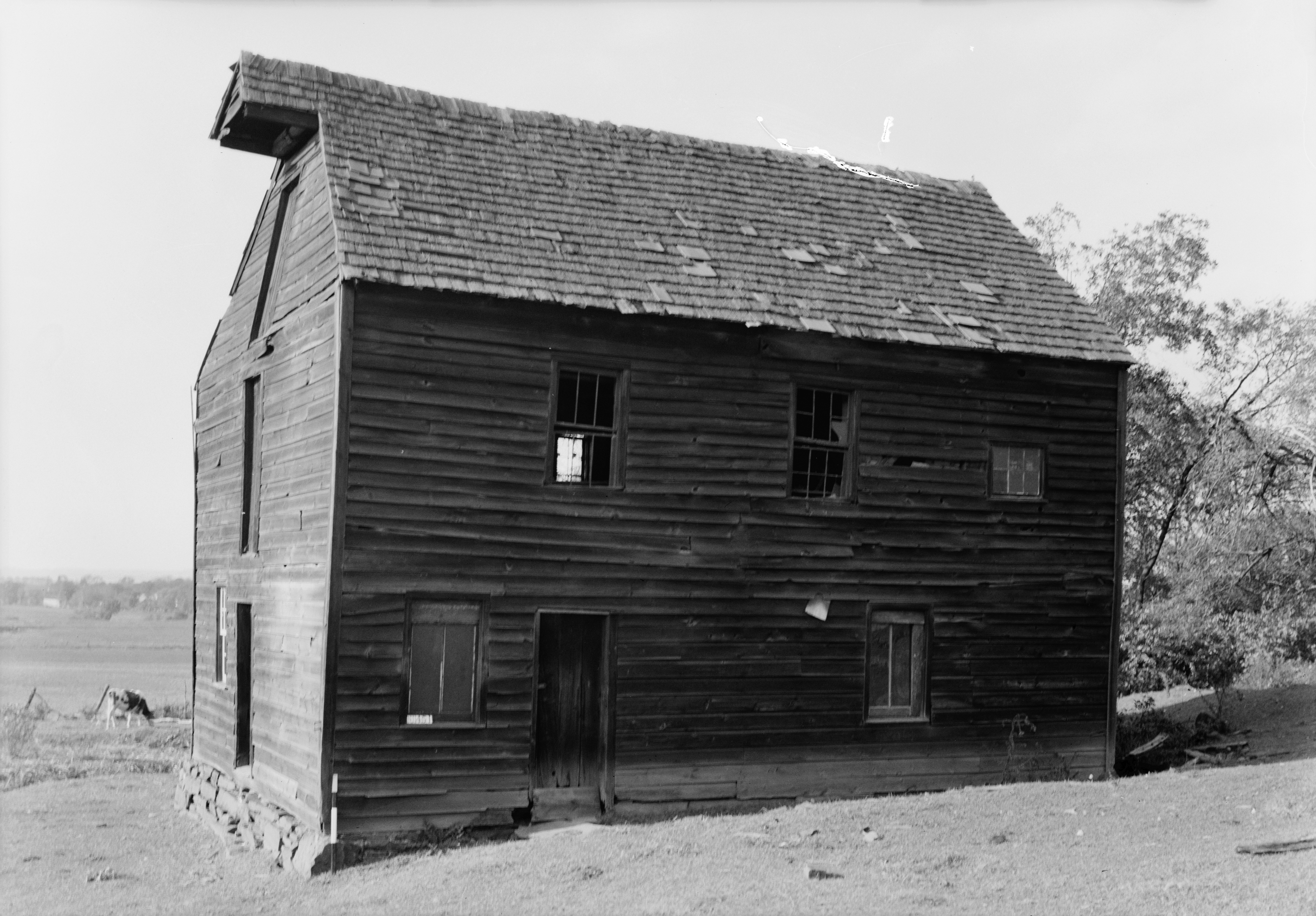
Frame Grist Mill, HABS photo from 1937

== See also ==
- National Register of Historic Places listings in Hunterdon County, New Jersey
