= Case Farmstead =

Historic house in New Jersey, United States

- U.S. National Register of Historic Places
- New Jersey Register of Historic Places
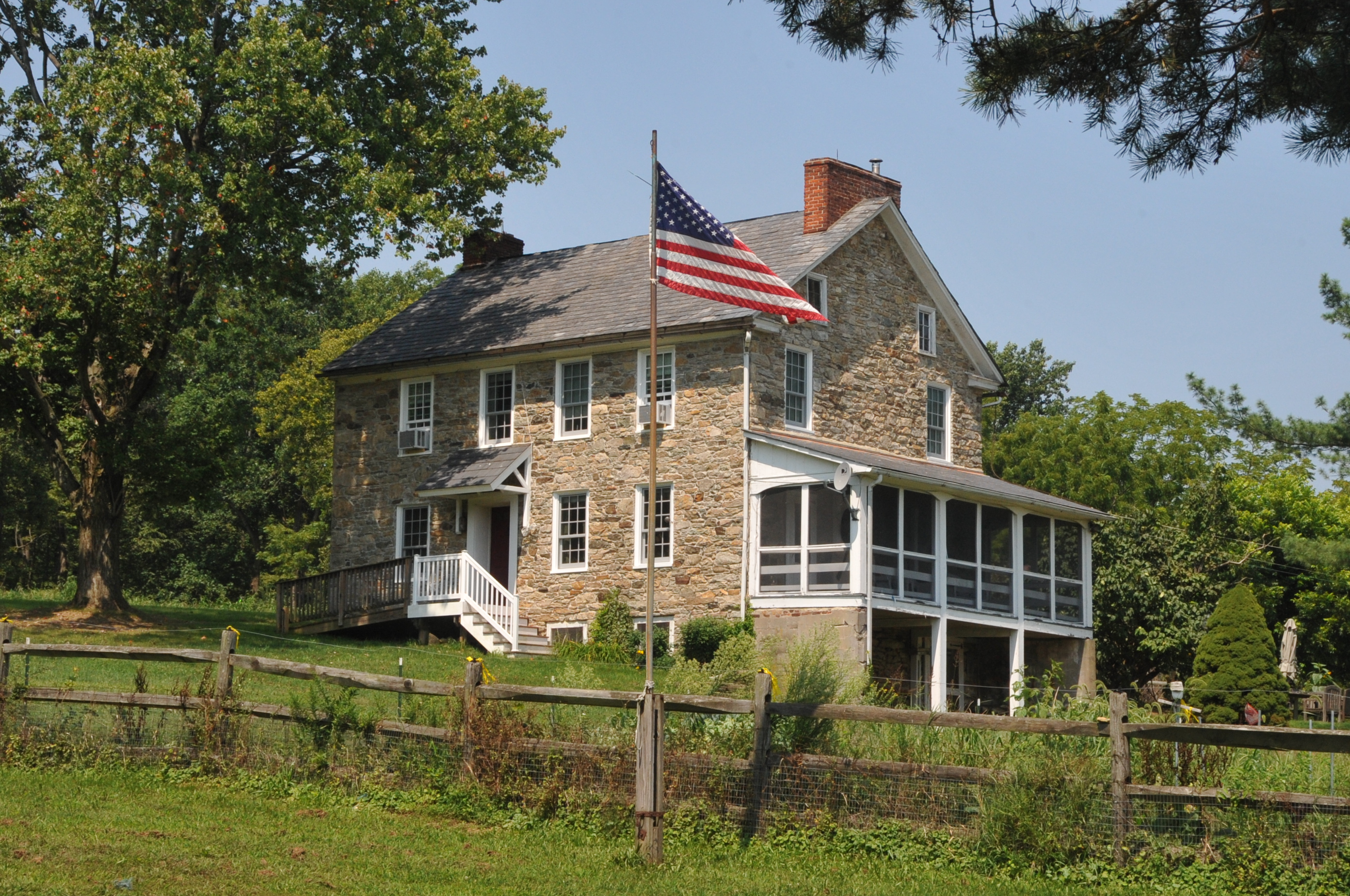

- Location within Hunterdon County, New Jersey Location within New Jersey Location within the United States
- Location: Little York-Pattenburg Road; Union Township, Hunterdon County, New Jersey
- Nearest city: Pattenburg, New Jersey
- Coordinates: 40°38′2″N 75°1′57″W
- Area: 88 acres (36 ha)
- Built: 1800
- Architectural style: I-house
- NRHP reference No.: 79001496
- NJRHP No.: 1634

Significant dates
- Added to NRHP: August 14, 1979
- Designated NJRHP: October 13, 1978

The Case Farmstead, also known as the Daniel Case / Sarah Clark Case Farmstead, is a historic 88-acre (36 ha) farm located along County Route 614 (Little York-Pattenburg Road) near Pattenburg in Union Township, Hunterdon County, New Jersey. It was added to the National Register of Historic Places on August 14, 1979, for its significance in architecture and medicine. The farmstead includes three contributing buildings.

== History and description ==
The two and one-half story stone house was built c. 1800 with I-house design. Daniel Case and his wife Sarah moved in c. 1801. Sarah Clark Case (1776–1859) was a nurse and midwife. In 1816, she earned a medical license, issued by the New Jersey Medical Society, and became the first licensed female physician in the county.

== See also ==
- National Register of Historic Places listings in Hunterdon County, New Jersey
