= Amsterdam, New Jersey =

Populated place in Hunterdon County, New Jersey, US

- Unincorporated community
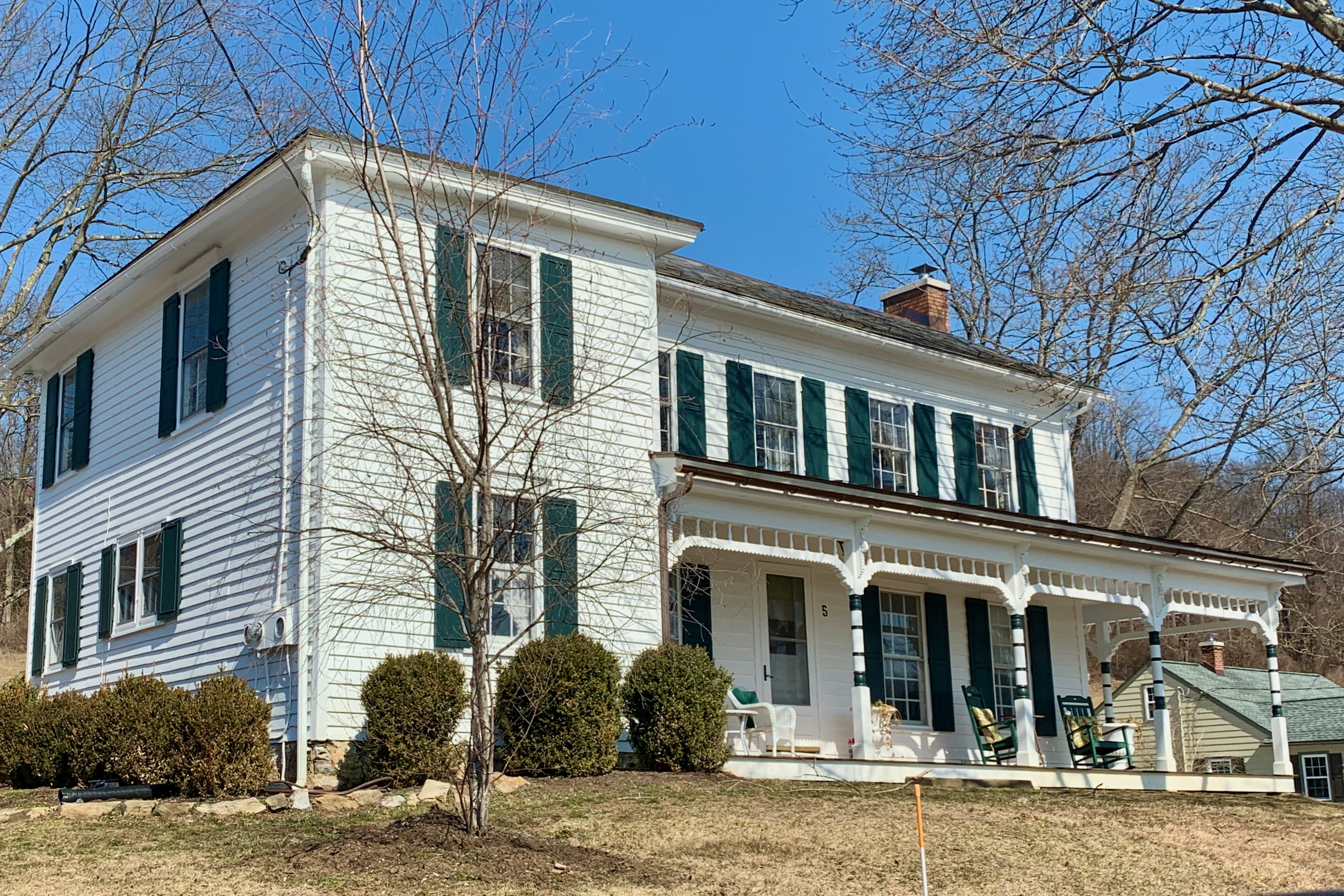
- Historic house at 5 Amsterdam Road

- Location in Hunterdon County Location in New Jersey Location in the United States
- Coordinates: 40°35′15″N 75°09′31″W
- Country: United States
- State: New Jersey
- County: Hunterdon
- Township: Holland
- Elevation: 335 ft (102 m)
- GNIS feature ID: 874335

Amsterdam is an unincorporated community located within Holland Township in Hunterdon County, in the U.S. state of New Jersey. Located on the southern flank of the Musconetcong Mountain, the area was settled in the first half of the 18th century. It was later named after Amsterdam, Netherlands. The Amsterdam Historic District, encompassing the community, was listed on the state and national registers of historic places in 1995.

== History ==
By 1881, Amsterdam had a saw mill, carpenter shop, and shoe shop.

The former Belvidere Delaware Railroad, which was built along the Delaware River in the 1850s, bypassed Amsterdam.

== Historic district ==
- Amsterdam Historic District
- U.S. National Register of Historic Places
- U.S. Historic district
- New Jersey Register of Historic Places
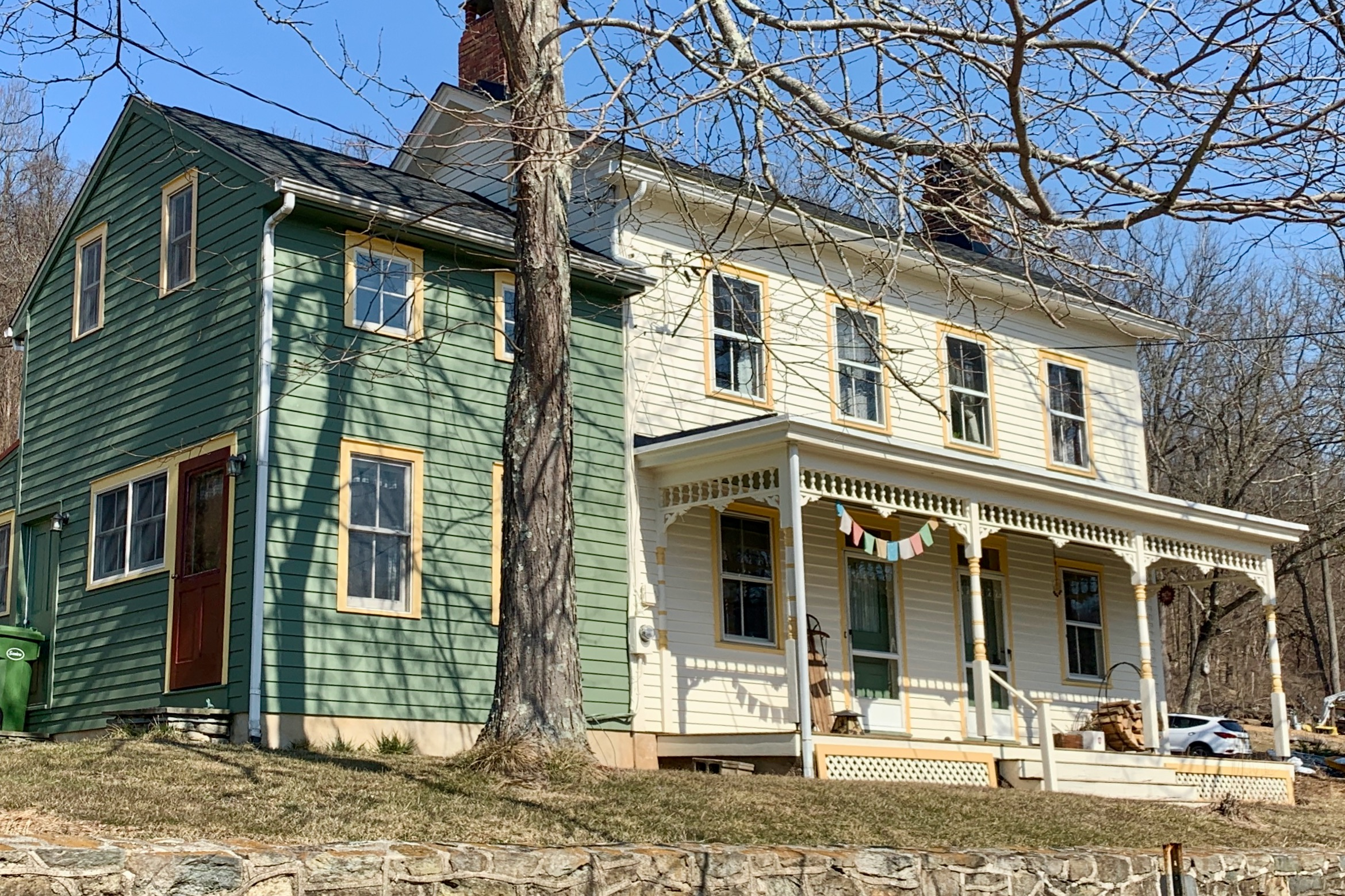
- 21 Amsterdam Road
- Location: Amsterdam, Church, and Crab Apple Hill roads
- Area: 60 acres (24 ha)
- Architectural style: Gothic Revival, Greek Revival, Italianate
- NRHP reference No.: 95000184
- NJRHP No.: 2811

Significant dates
- Added to NRHP: March 17, 1995
- Designated NJRHP: January 24, 1995

The Amsterdam Historic District is a 60-acre (24 ha) historic district encompassing the community along Amsterdam, Church, and Crab Apple Hill roads. It was added to the National Register of Historic Places on March 17, 1995 for its significance in architecture and community development. The district includes 30 contributing buildings.

The farmhouse at 5 Amsterdam Road was built c. 1830–1850 and shows Greek Revival influences. The farmhouse at 21 Amsterdam Road was built c. 1840–1850 and features Queen Anne embellishment. The bank barns for both of these farms are contributing to the district. The farmhouse at 33 Amsterdam Road was built c. 1830–1850 with Gothic Revival influences.

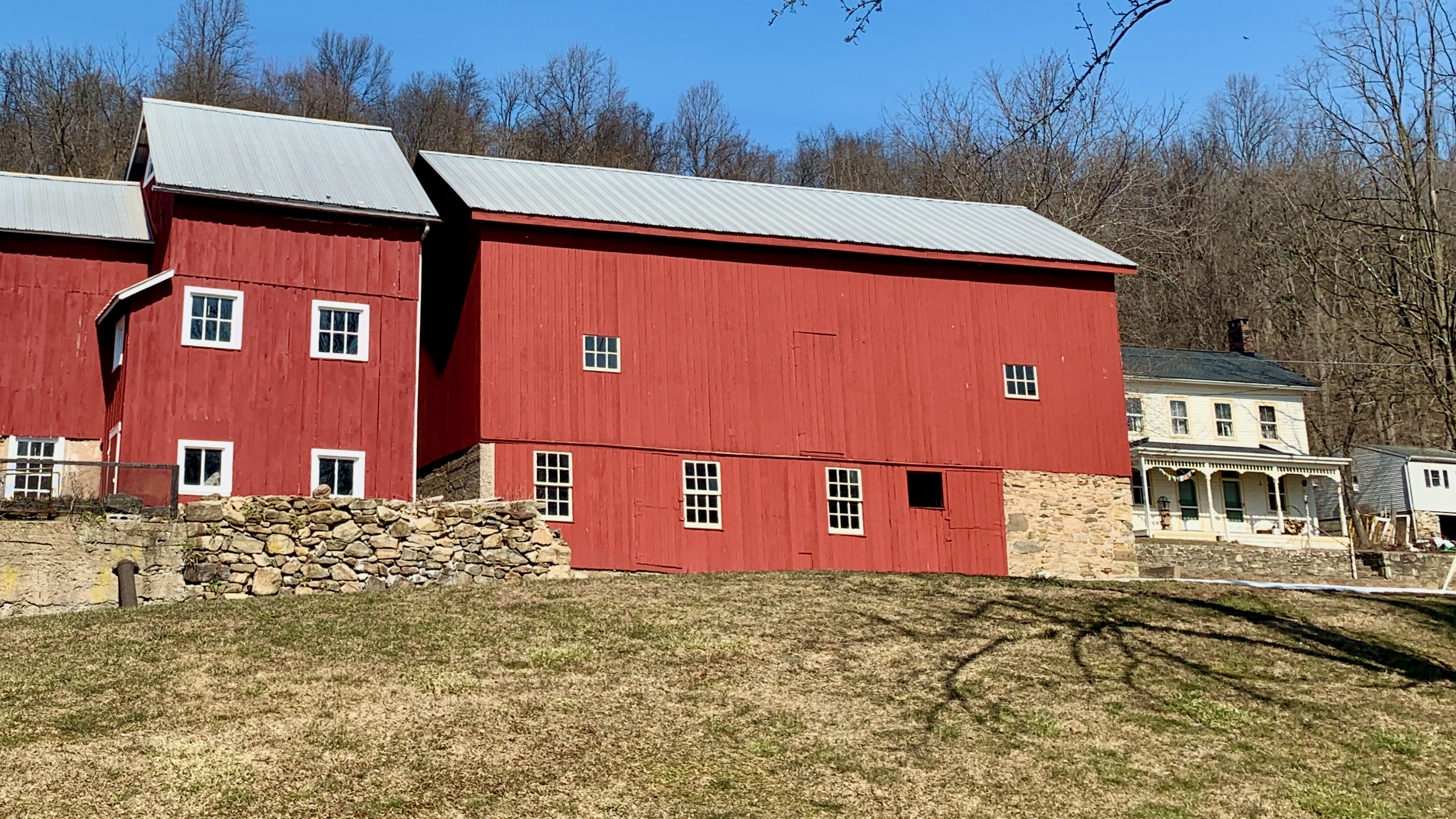
Bank barns, view from Church Road

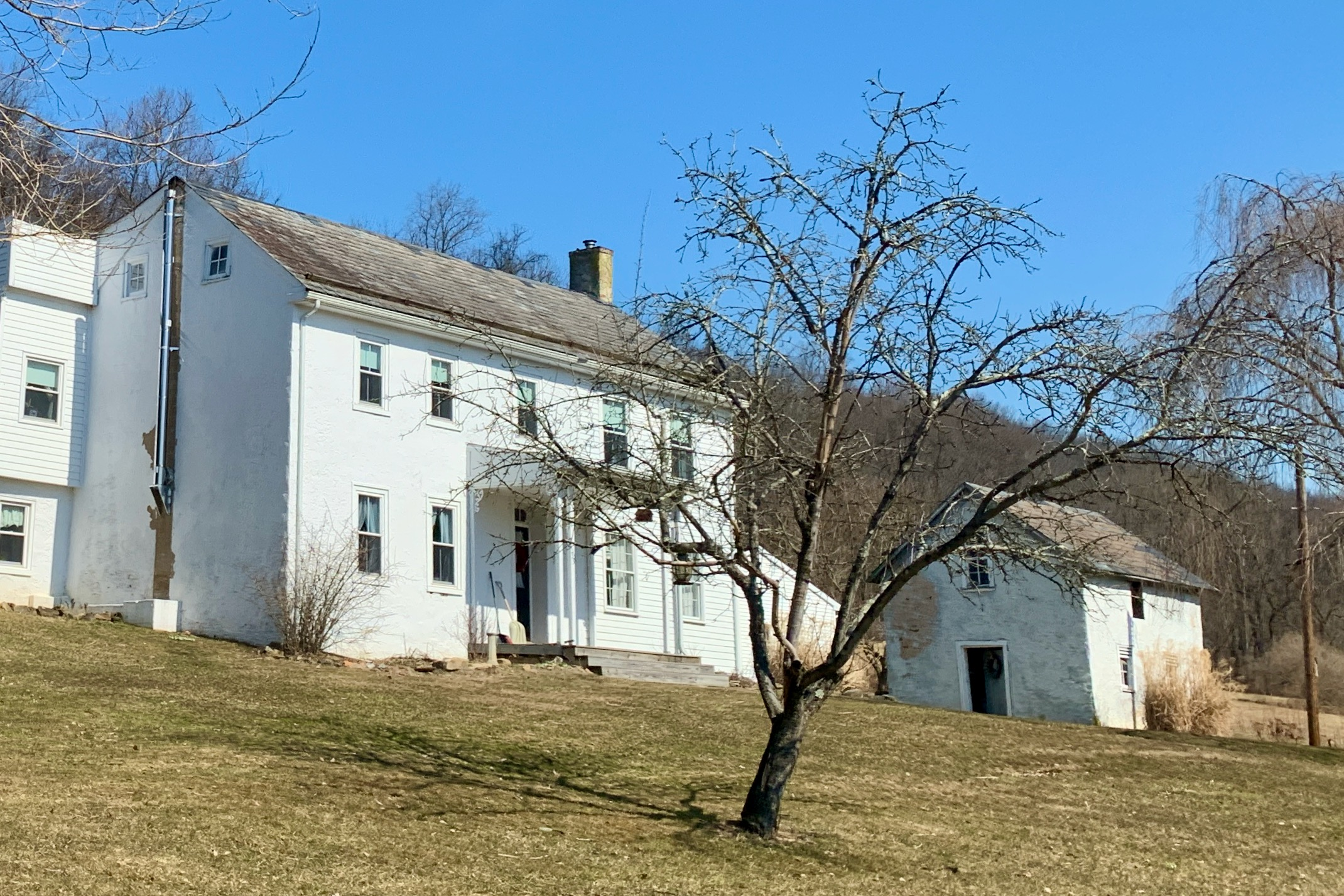
House at 33 Amsterdam Road

== See also ==
- National Register of Historic Places listings in Hunterdon County, New Jersey
