= Mount Salem Methodist Episcopal Church =

Historic church in New Jersey, United States

- U.S. National Register of Historic Places
- New Jersey Register of Historic Places
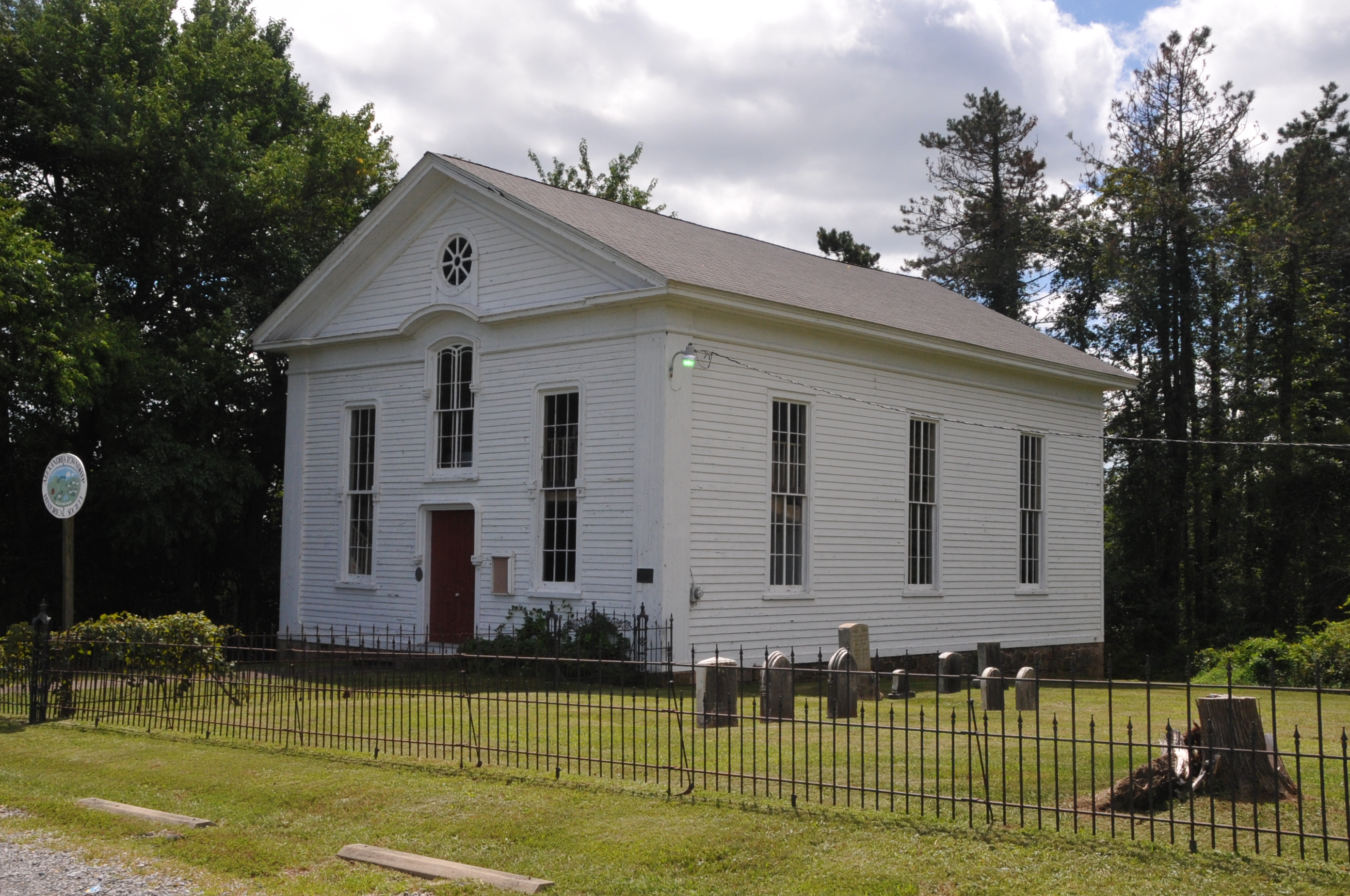

- Location within Hunterdon County, New Jersey Location within New Jersey Location within the United States
- Nearest city: Alexandria Township, New Jersey
- Coordinates: 40°36′19″N 74°59′0″W
- Area: 1.8 acres (0.73 ha)
- Built: 1864
- Architect: Bosenbury, Eli
- Architectural style: Greek Revival, Italianate
- NRHP reference No.: 88000592
- NJRHP No.: 1562

Significant dates
- Added to NRHP: May 19, 1988
- Designated NJRHP: March 23, 1988

Mount Salem Methodist Episcopal Church is a historic church in Alexandria Township, Hunterdon County, New Jersey, United States.

It was built in 1864 and added to the National Register of Historic Places on May 19, 1988.

== See also ==
- National Register of Historic Places listings in Hunterdon County, New Jersey
