= Christoffel Vought Farmstead =

Historic house in New Jersey, United States

- U.S. National Register of Historic Places
- New Jersey Register of Historic Places
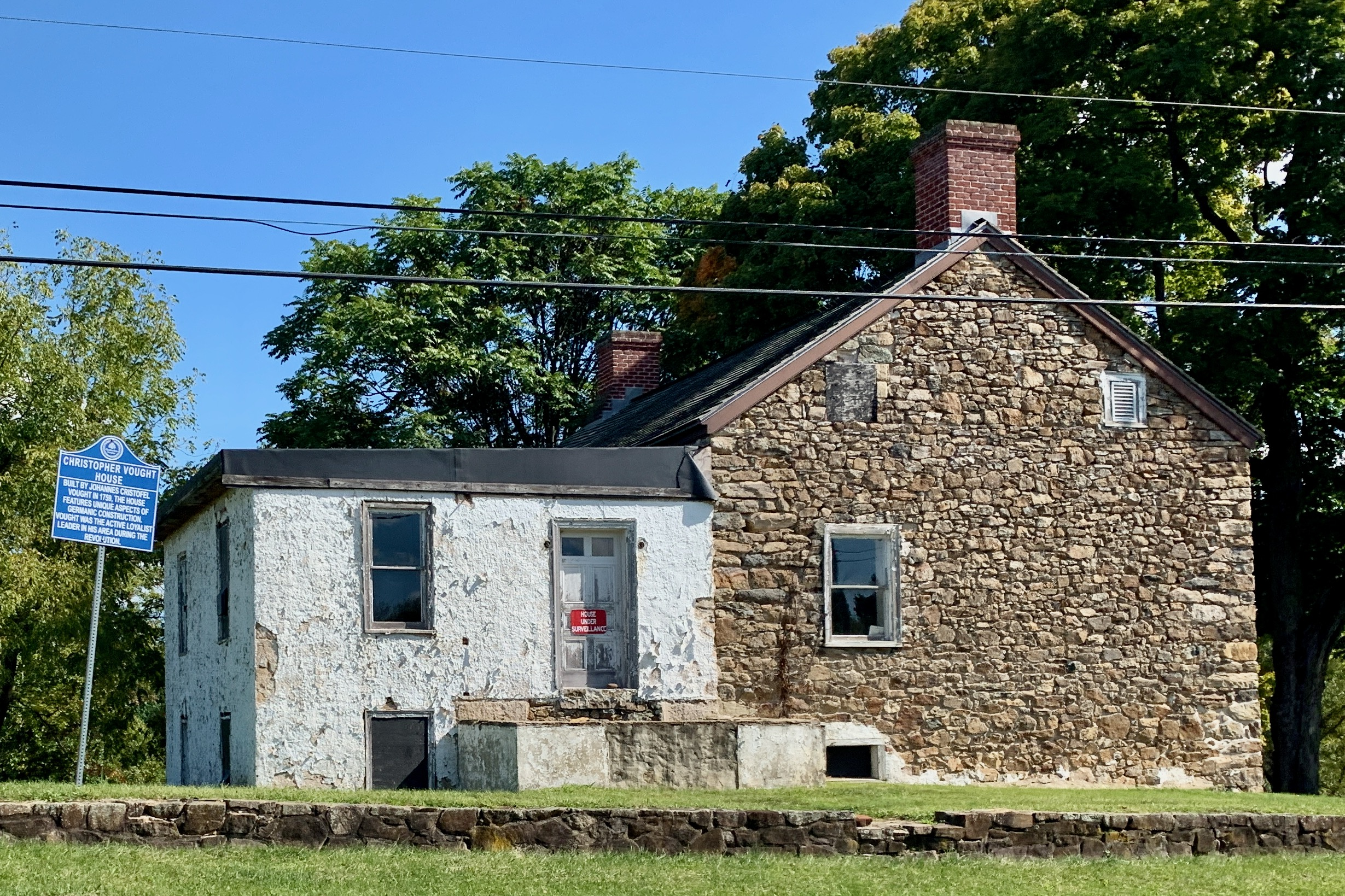
- Farmstead in 2020

- Location within Hunterdon County, New Jersey Location within New Jersey Location within the United States
- Nearest city: Annandale, New Jersey
- Coordinates: 40.64326°N 74.8984°W
- Area: 25 acres (10 ha)
- Built: 1759
- Architectural style: Colonial, German-American Bank House
- NRHP reference No.: 07001403
- NJRHP No.: 4392

Significant dates
- Added to NRHP: January 16, 2008
- Designated NJRHP: September 18, 2007

Christoffel Vought Farmstead, commonly known as the 1759 Vought House, is located near Annandale in Clinton Township, Hunterdon County, New Jersey. Built in 1759, it was added to the National Register of Historic Places on January 16, 2008, for its significance in agriculture, archaeology, architecture, exploration/settlement and military history. The building is on Preservation New Jersey's 2010 10 Most Endangered Historic Sites list. The building is located on the grounds of the Clinton Township Middle School and is owned by the Clinton Township Board of Education.

== History ==
Christoffel Vought's parents were German Lutheran immigrants from the Electoral Palatinate. Christoffel built the 2 1/2-story stone house in 1759. The house is a heavy timber frame, and the walls are made with wattle and daub. Distinctive features of the interior are four original plaster ceilings with geometric designs. The house was part of a 258-acre farm.

Christoffel Vought was a loyalist during the American Revolution and volunteered to join the British Army. Vought was captured by the Patriots and found guilty by a Jury of Inquisition. Vought and his family went into exile in Nova Scotia. The land and house were sold at auction.

== See also ==
- National Register of Historic Places listings in Hunterdon County, New Jersey
- List of the oldest buildings in New Jersey
