= Everittstown, New Jersey =

Populated place in Hunterdon County, New Jersey, US

- Unincorporated community
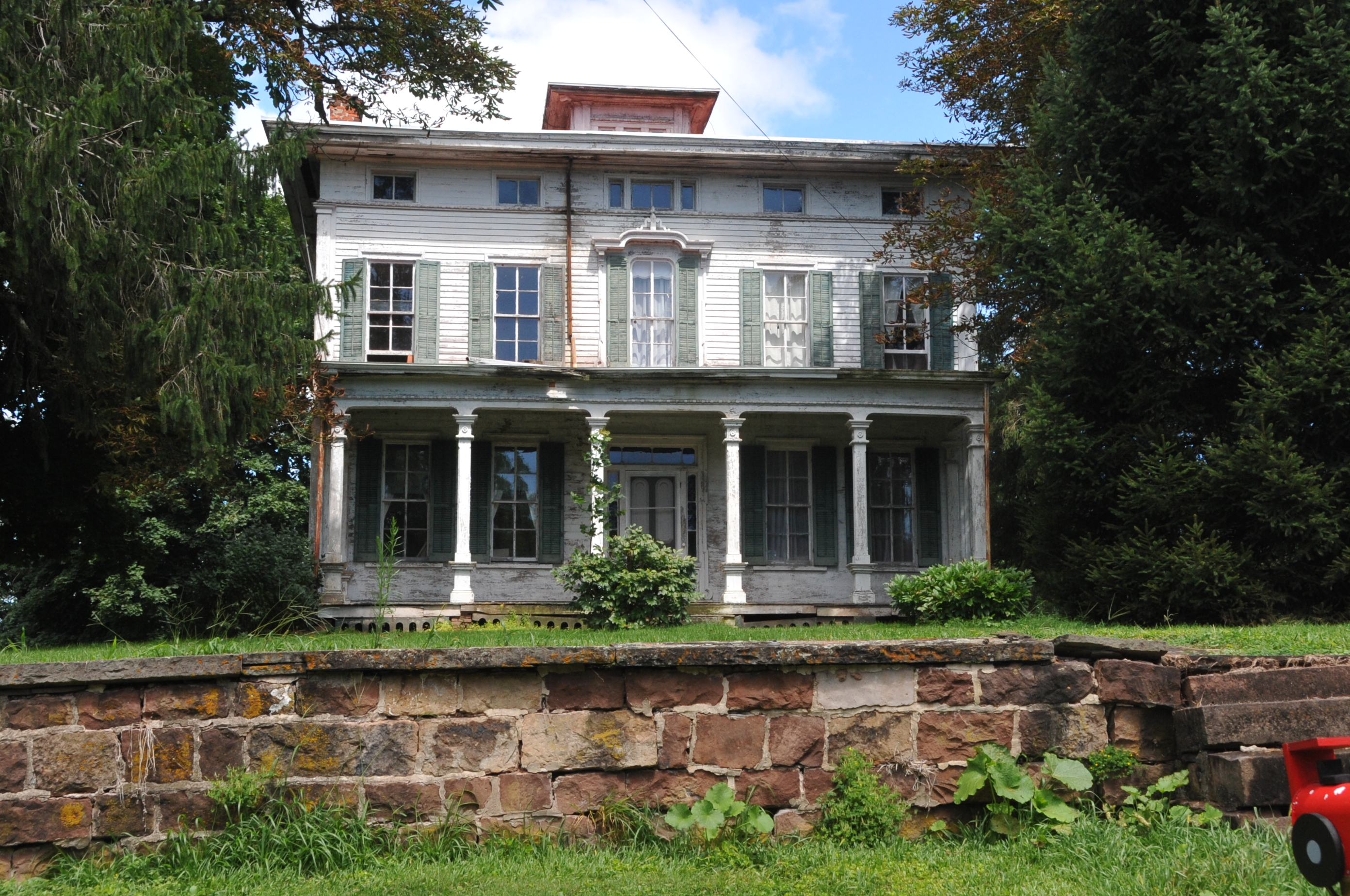
- Historic Baltus Pickel house in Everittstown

- Location in Hunterdon County Location in New Jersey Location in the United States
- Coordinates: 40°33′57″N 75°1′44″W
- Country: United States
- State: New Jersey
- County: Hunterdon
- Township: Alexandria
- Elevation: 322 ft (98 m)
- Time zone: UTC−05:00 (Eastern (EST))
  - Summer (DST): UTC−04:00 (EDT)
- GNIS feature ID: 876242

Everittstown (also known as Everitts Town) is an unincorporated community located within Alexandria Township, in Hunterdon County, in the U.S. state of New Jersey. The Everittstown Historic District was listed on the National Register of Historic Places in 1980.

== Historic district ==
- Everittstown Historic District
- U.S. National Register of Historic Places
- U.S. Historic district
- New Jersey Register of Historic Places
- Area: 102 acres (41 ha)
- Architectural style: Italianate, Vernacular Italianate
- NRHP reference No.: 80002496
- NJRHP No.: 1558

Significant dates
- Added to NRHP: August 28, 1980
- Designated NJRHP: February 20, 1980

The Everittstown Historic District is a 102-acre (41 ha) historic district encompassing the village. The district is located at intersection of County Route 513, County Route 519 and Palmyra Road. It was added to the National Register of Historic Places on August 28, 1980, for its significance in architecture, commerce, and industry. The district includes 36 contributing buildings. The Baltus Pickel house was built c. 1860 with vernacular Italianate style. The Everittstown United Methodist Church was built in 1881.

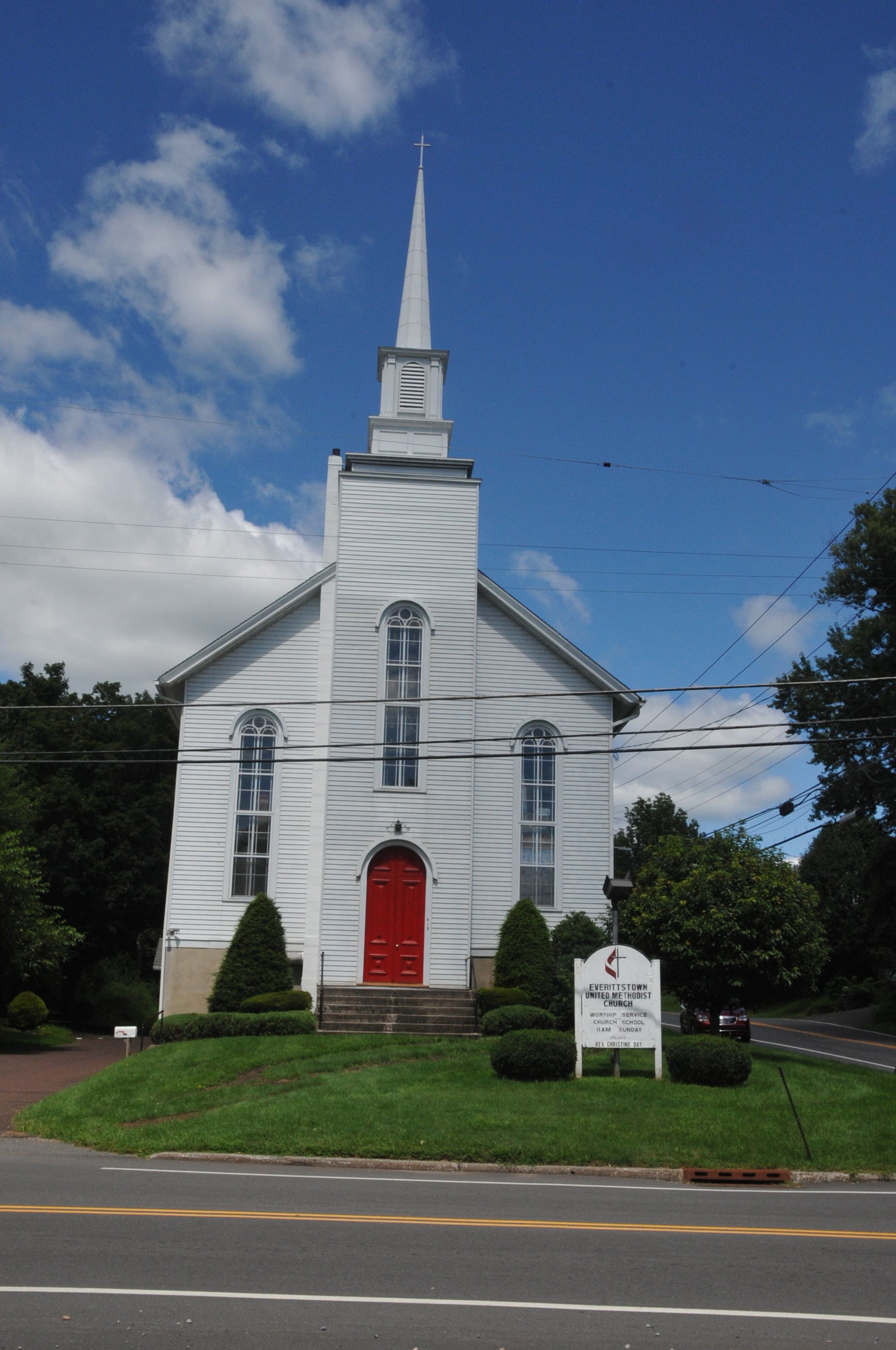
Everittstown United Methodist Church

== See also ==
- National Register of Historic Places listings in Hunterdon County, New Jersey
