= Van Syckel, New Jersey =

Populated place in Hunterdon County, New Jersey, US

- Unincorporated community
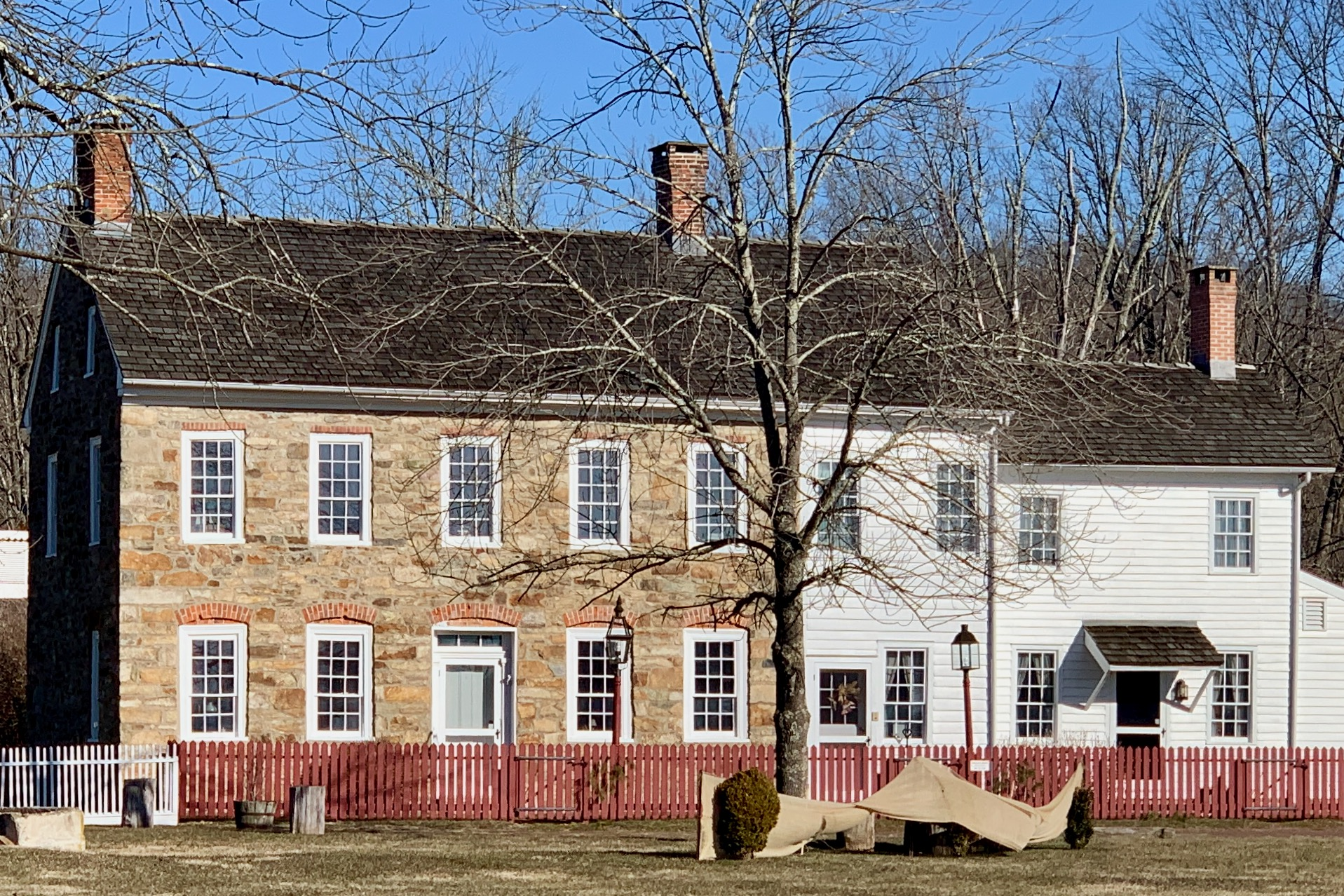
- Van Syckel Tavern

- Location within Hunterdon County, New Jersey Location within New Jersey Location within the United States
- Coordinates: 40°38′59″N 74°58′14″W
- Country: United States
- State: New Jersey
- County: Hunterdon
- Township: Union
- Elevation: 295 ft (90 m)
- GNIS feature ID: 881429

Van Syckel (also spelled Van Syckle) is an unincorporated community located within Union Township in Hunterdon County, New Jersey. The Van Syckel Corner District was listed on the National Register of Historic Places in 1979.

== History ==
Van Syckel's Tavern, then known as Reynolds Tavern, was built in 1763 by David Reynolds at the intersection of Van Syckels Corner and Norton Roads. It was constructed with stone in Georgian architecture style. Reynolds was later convicted and executed by hanging in Morristown for counterfeiting money on September 17, 1773. In 1795, the tavern was bought by Aaron Van Syckel. The farmhouse of J. Van Syckel next to the tavern was built in 1829 with Greek Revival style.

== Historic district ==
- Van Syckel Corner District
- U.S. National Register of Historic Places
- U.S. Historic district
- New Jersey Register of Historic Places
- Area: 379 acres (153 ha)
- Built: 1763
- Architectural style: Late Victorian, Georgian, Vernacular Georgian
- NRHP reference No.: 79001495
- NJRHP No.: 1640

Significant dates
- Added to NRHP: November 8, 1979
- Designated NJRHP: August 9, 1979

The Van Syckel Corner District is a historic district encompassing the village and extending north to Norton along the border of Union Township with Bethlehem Township. It was added to the National Register of Historic Places on November 8, 1979, for its significance in agriculture, architecture, and commerce. The district includes 18 contributing buildings. The Norton Methodist Episcopal Church was built in 1828, rebuilt in 1855, and renovated in 1881 and 1908.

== Gallery ==
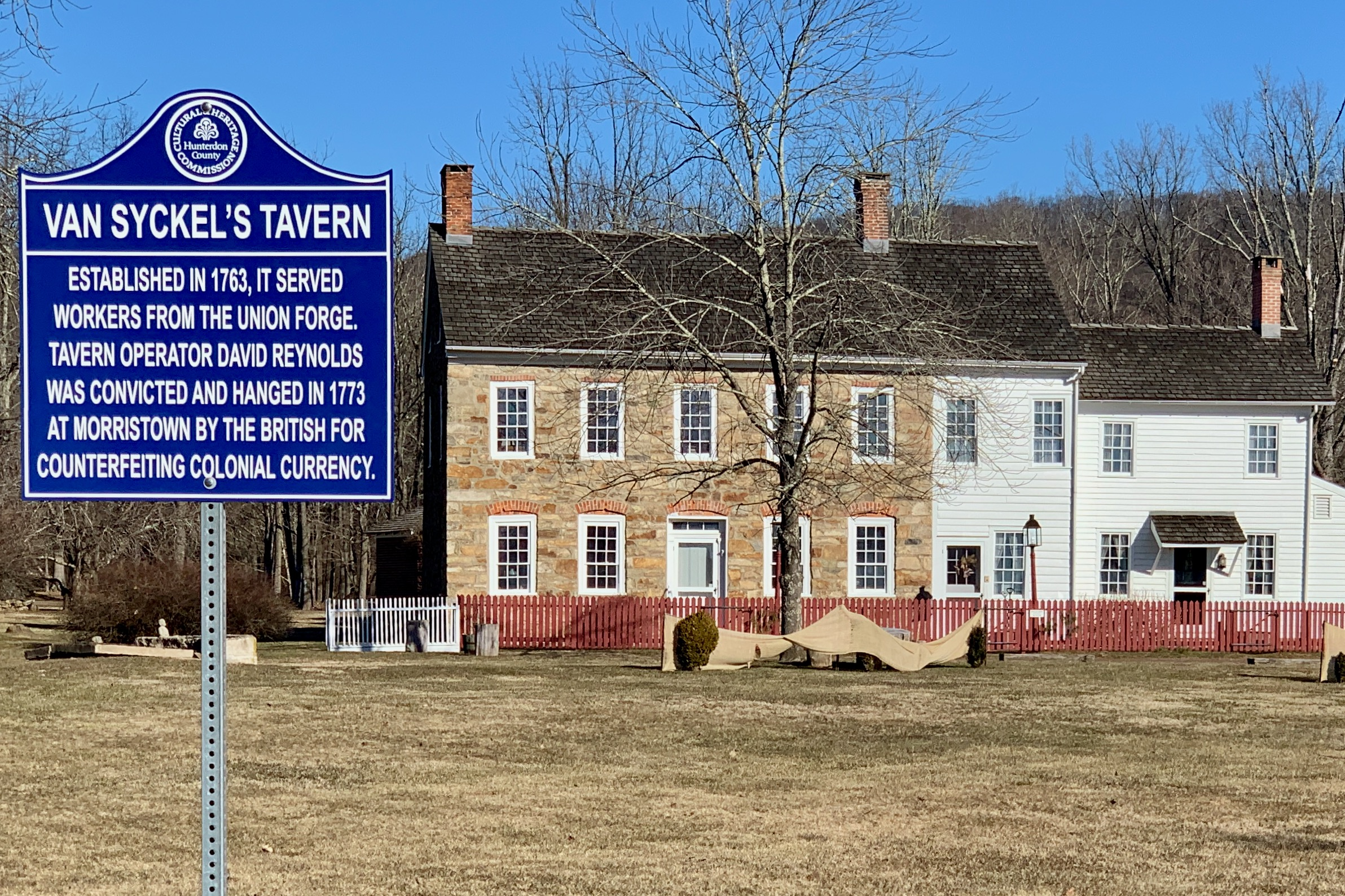
Van Syckel's Tavern information

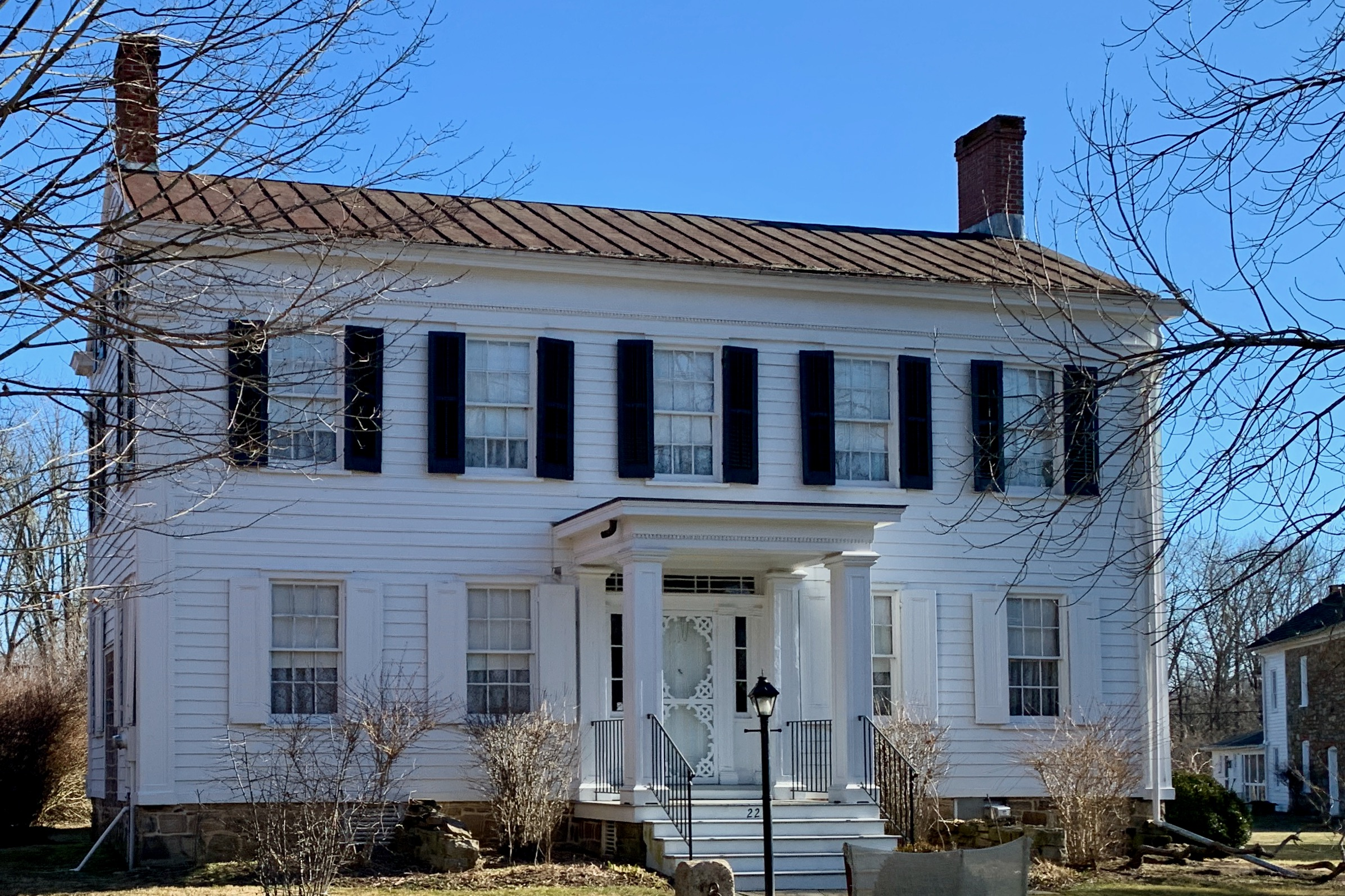
J. Van Syckel farmhouse

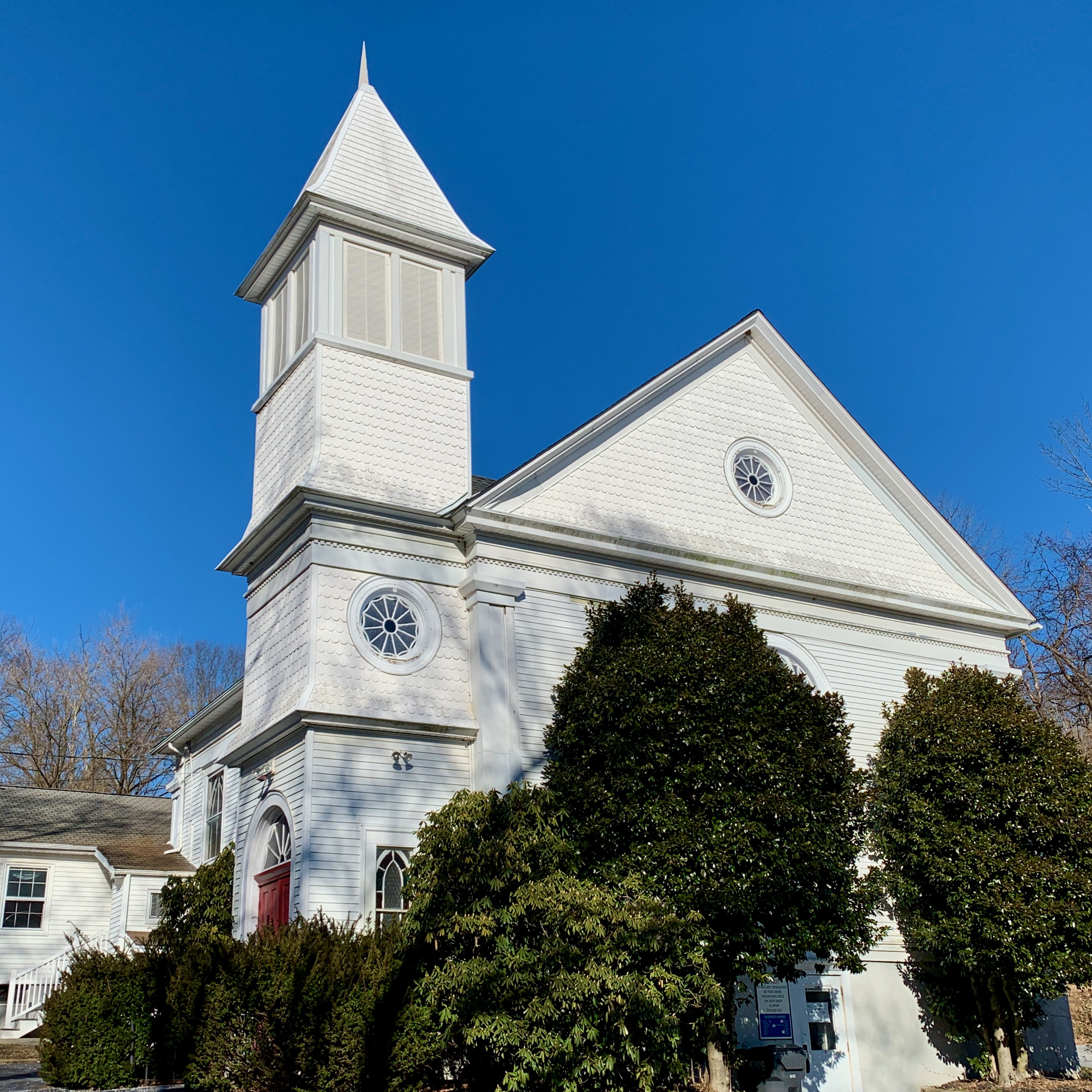
Norton Methodist Episcopal Church

== See also ==
- National Register of Historic Places listings in Hunterdon County, New Jersey
- List of the oldest buildings in New Jersey
