= Pursley's Ferry Historic District =

Historic district in New Jersey, United States

- U.S. National Register of Historic Places
- U.S. Historic district
- New Jersey Register of Historic Places
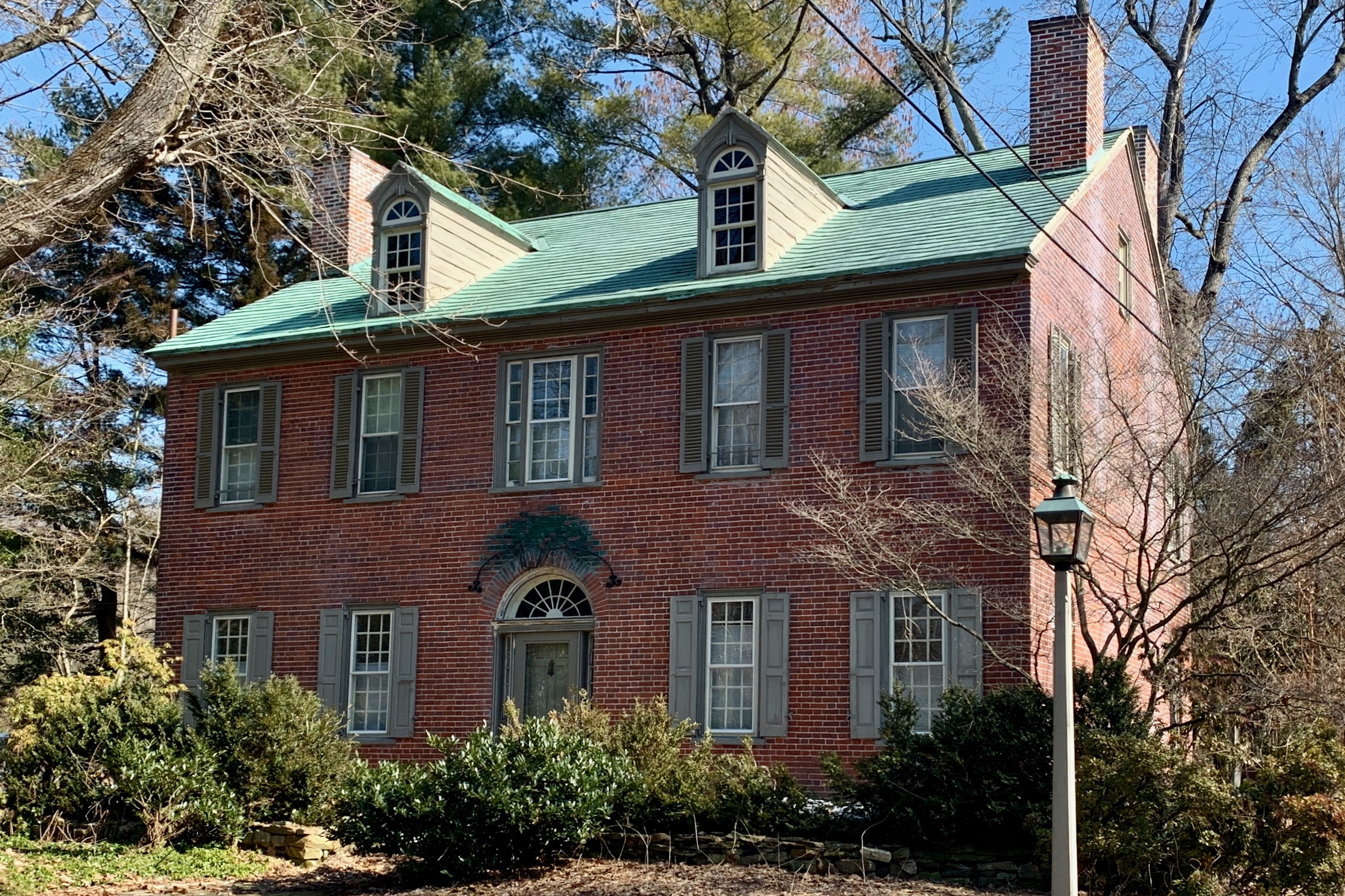
- Hart Johnson House

- Location within Hunterdon County, New Jersey Location within New Jersey Location within the United States
- Location: Old River Road at Church Road, Holland Township, New Jersey
- Coordinates: 40°34′36″N 75°11′28″W
- Area: 61 acres (25 ha)
- Architectural style: Federal
- NRHP reference No.: 80002495
- NJRHP No.: 1598

Significant dates
- Added to NRHP: October 8, 1980
- Designated NJRHP: July 12, 1978

Pursley's Ferry Historic District is a 61-acre (25 ha) historic district located along Old River Road near Church Road by the Delaware River in Holland Township, Hunterdon County, New Jersey. It was added to the National Register of Historic Places on October 8, 1980 for its significance in architecture, commerce, and transportation. The district includes 4 contributing buildings.

== History ==
Pursley's Ferry, also spelled Parsley, is located south of the mouth of the Musconetcong River. Starting sometime after 1742, the ferry went across the Delaware River to transport goods to and from the Durham Mill and Furnace in Pennsylvania. The Purcell/Brinks House was the tavern at the crossing managed by Thomas Pursell and later by Daniel Brinks. The building of the Delaware Canal, Delaware and Raritan Canal and Belvidere Delaware Railroad during the early 19th century ended the need for the ferry.

== Description ==
The Hart Johnson House is a late 18th century two and one-half story brick farmhouse built with Federal style and featuring Flemish bond.

== Gallery ==
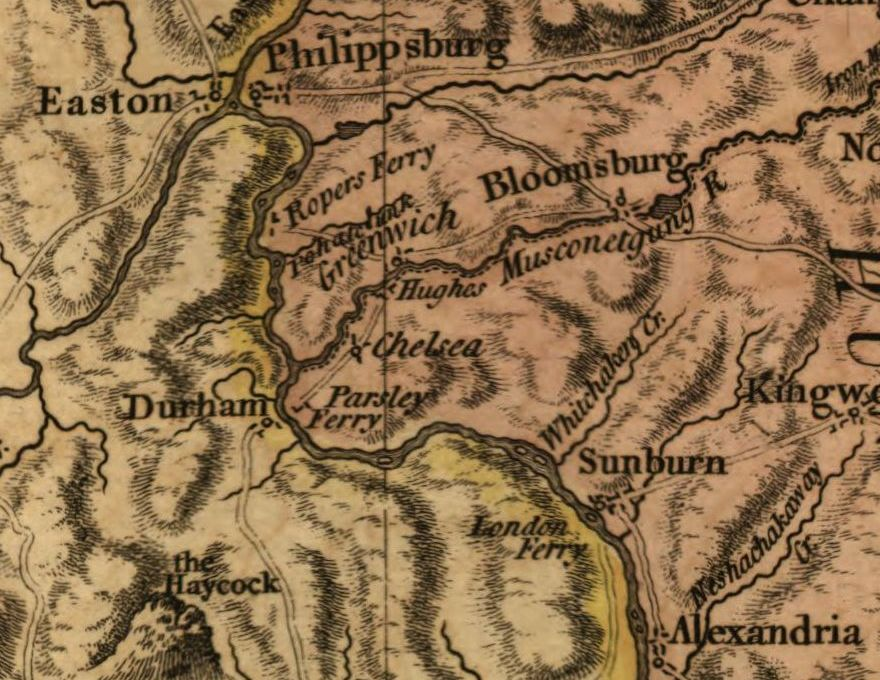
Parsley Ferry on 1777 map by William Faden

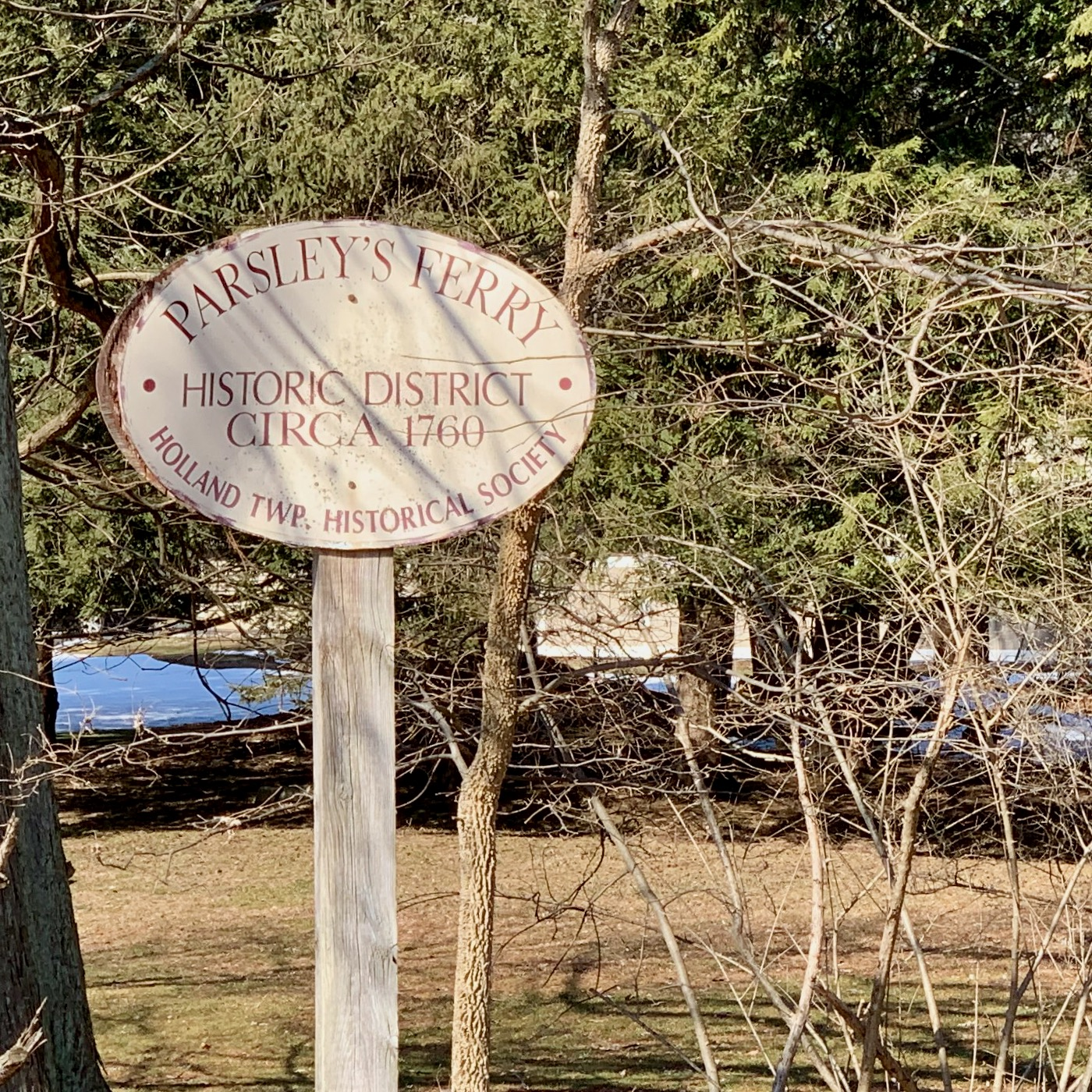
Historic District information sign

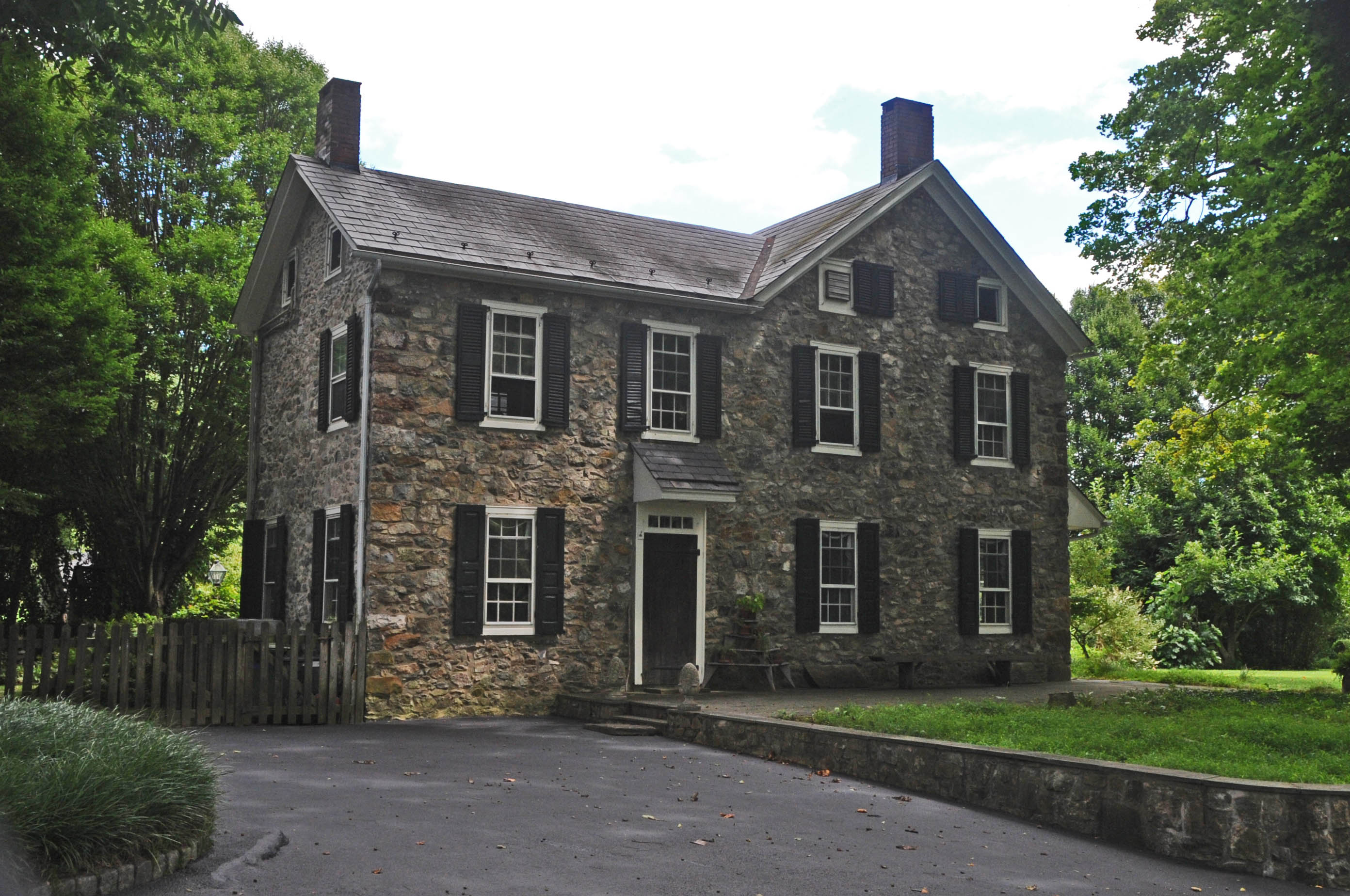
Purcell/Brinks House at the ferry crossing
