= Mountainville, New Jersey =

Populated place in Hunterdon County, New Jersey, US

- Unincorporated community
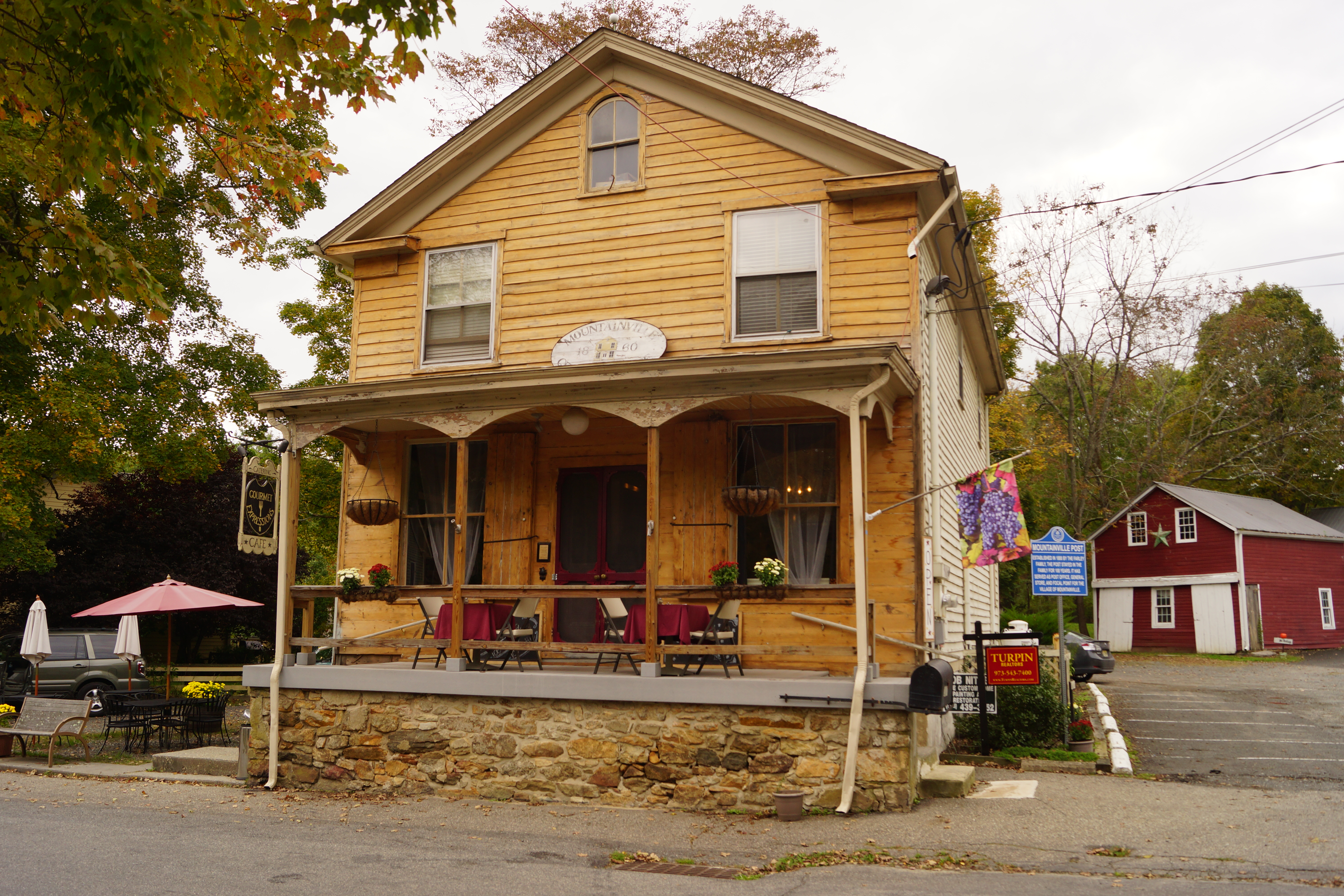
- Historic general store in Mountainville

- Location of Mountainville in Hunterdon County Inset: Location of county within the state of New Jersey Mountainville, New Jersey (New Jersey) Mountainville, New Jersey (the United States)
- Coordinates: 40°41′26″N 74°48′42″W
- Country: United States
- State: New Jersey
- County: Hunterdon
- Township: Tewksbury
- Elevation: 413 ft (126 m)
- GNIS feature ID: 878622

Mountainville is an unincorporated community located within Tewksbury Township in Hunterdon County, New Jersey. The Mountainville Historic District was listed on the National Register of Historic Places in 1993.

== Historic district ==
- Mountainville Historic District
- U.S. National Register of Historic Places
- U.S. Historic district
- New Jersey Register of Historic Places
- Location: Main Street, Guinea Hollow, Saw Mill, Rockaway Creek and Philhower Roads
- Area: 197 acres (80 ha)
- Architectural style: Bungalow/craftsman, Italian Villa, Greek Revival
- NRHP reference No.: 93001360
- NJRHP No.: 1631

Significant dates
- Added to NRHP: December 7, 1993
- Designated NJRHP: July 30, 1993

The Mountainville Historic District is a historic district encompassing the village. It was added to the National Register of Historic Places on December 7, 1993 for its significance in architecture, commerce, community development, and industry. It includes 64 contributing buildings. Farley's General Store was built c. 1868 with Italianate style.
