= Wells Street Bridge =

Wells Street Bridge may refer to:

- Wells Street Bridge (Chicago), a bascule bridge over the Chicago River, in downtown Chicago, Illinois
- Wells Street Bridge (Fort Wayne, Indiana), listed on the National Register of Historic Places
