= Lockatong =

Lockatong may refer to:

- Lockatong Creek, a New Jersey tributary of the Delaware River
- Lockatong Formation, a mapped bedrock unit in Pennsylvania, New Jersey, and New York
