= Wrought Iron Bridge Company =

American bridge fabrication and construction company

- Industry: Civil Engineering
- Founded: 1864
- Headquarters: Canton, Ohio
- Key people: David Hammond, founder; Jacob W. Miller, President from 18??–1872
- Products: Bridge building construction

The Wrought Iron Bridge Company was a bridge fabrication and construction company based in Canton, Ohio, United States. It specialized in the fabrication of iron truss bridges and was a prolific bridge builder in the late 19th century. It was one of the 28 firms consolidated by J. P. Morgan into the American Bridge Company in 1900. Many of its bridges have been listed on the National Register of Historic Places.

== Products ==
The Wrought Iron Bridge Company specialized in relatively short-span iron truss bridges. Most were built for highway use, as the railroads were all privately owned at the time and employed their own engineers. The company supplied a catalog of bridge designs and mass-produced the parts to build these designs. Once a bridge was ordered, the pieces were shipped by train to the nearest station. Thus, local contractors were able to assemble a bridge very quickly, much like a model.

=== 1882 pamphlet ===
Illustration of a single intersection Pratt truss

An illustrated pamphlet, dated 1882, is available online. In this pamphlet, Wrought Iron Bridge claims that "during the past 18 years this firm have erected nearly 4,300 spans, varying in length from 20 to 300 feet." At the time of publication, the company had worked in 26 US States, Canada and Mexico.

Wrought Iron Bridge were able to assemble their bridges very quickly and the pamphlet claims that they "have completed 100 to 140 foot spans at points from 100 to 300 miles distant from our works in 8 to 15 days." They were not quite as fast on larger bridges, but the "350 foot bridge, 38 foot wide, built at New Philadelphia, Ohio, was completed for travel in 40 days from the receipt of the contract," a speed unheard of for modern construction, often because of legal red tape.

== Surviving bridges ==
- Aetnaville Bridge, in Wheeling, West Virginia, 1891
- Bishop Road Bridge in Upper Allen Township, Cumberland County, Pennsylvania 1898
- Blackfriars Street Bridge, in London, Ontario, 1875
- Chain Lakes Bridge, near Palo, Iowa, 1884
- County Line Bowstring, near Concordia, Kansas, 1876
- Delhi Bridge, Scio Township, Michigan, 1883
- Dickey Bridge, in Orange County Indiana, Circa 1880
- East Mineral Road Bridge, Erving/Montague, Franklin County, Massachusetts, 1888
- Fourpoints Bridge, near Emmitsburg, Maryland, 1878?
- Gholson Bridge, in Brunswick County, Virginia, 1884
- Hotel Bridge, Leeds, Northampton, Hampshire County, Massachusetts, 1880
- Howell Park Golf Course Bridge in Howell, New Jersey 1899
- Kern Bridge, in Blue Earth County, Minnesota, 1873
- Laughery Creek Bridge, in Dearborn County, Indiana, 1878
- Lawrence Bridge in Jackson Junction, Iowa, 1880
- Lattice Road Bridge, Hume, New York, 1887
- Linville Creek Bridge, in Broadway, Rockingham County, Virginia, 1898
- Maple/Foster Bridge, Barton Hills, Michigan, circa 1876
- Masemore Road Bridge, near Baltimore, Maryland, 1898
- Nevius Street Bridge, in Raritan/Hillsborough, New Jersey, 1886
- Old Mill Road truss bridge over the Wickecheoke Creek, Delaware Township, New Jersey, 1899
- Poffenberger Road Bridge, near Jefferson, Maryland, 1878
- Pott's Bridge, in Glasco, Kansas, 1884
- Rockafellows Mill Bridge, Rockefellows Mills, New Jersey, 1900
- Rome Westernville Road Bridge, Mohawk River, Rome, New York, 1884
- Rough Holler Bridge, near Hermitage, Missouri, 1891
- Springbanks (Renwick Road) Bridge, Plainfield, Illinois, built before 1901
- Strimple's Mill Road Bridge over Lockatong Creek, Delaware Township, New Jersey, 1897
- Tioga Bridge White / Carroll County, Indiana 1890
- Van Buren Bridge, in Freeport, Illinois, 1885
- Walnut River Bridge, near Douglass, Kansas in Butler County, Kansas, built before 1900
- Wells Street Bridge, Fort Wayne, Indiana, 1884
- West Liberty Bridge CR-225, in Morrow County, Ohio, 1876

== Gallery ==
Wrought Iron Bridge Company Gallery

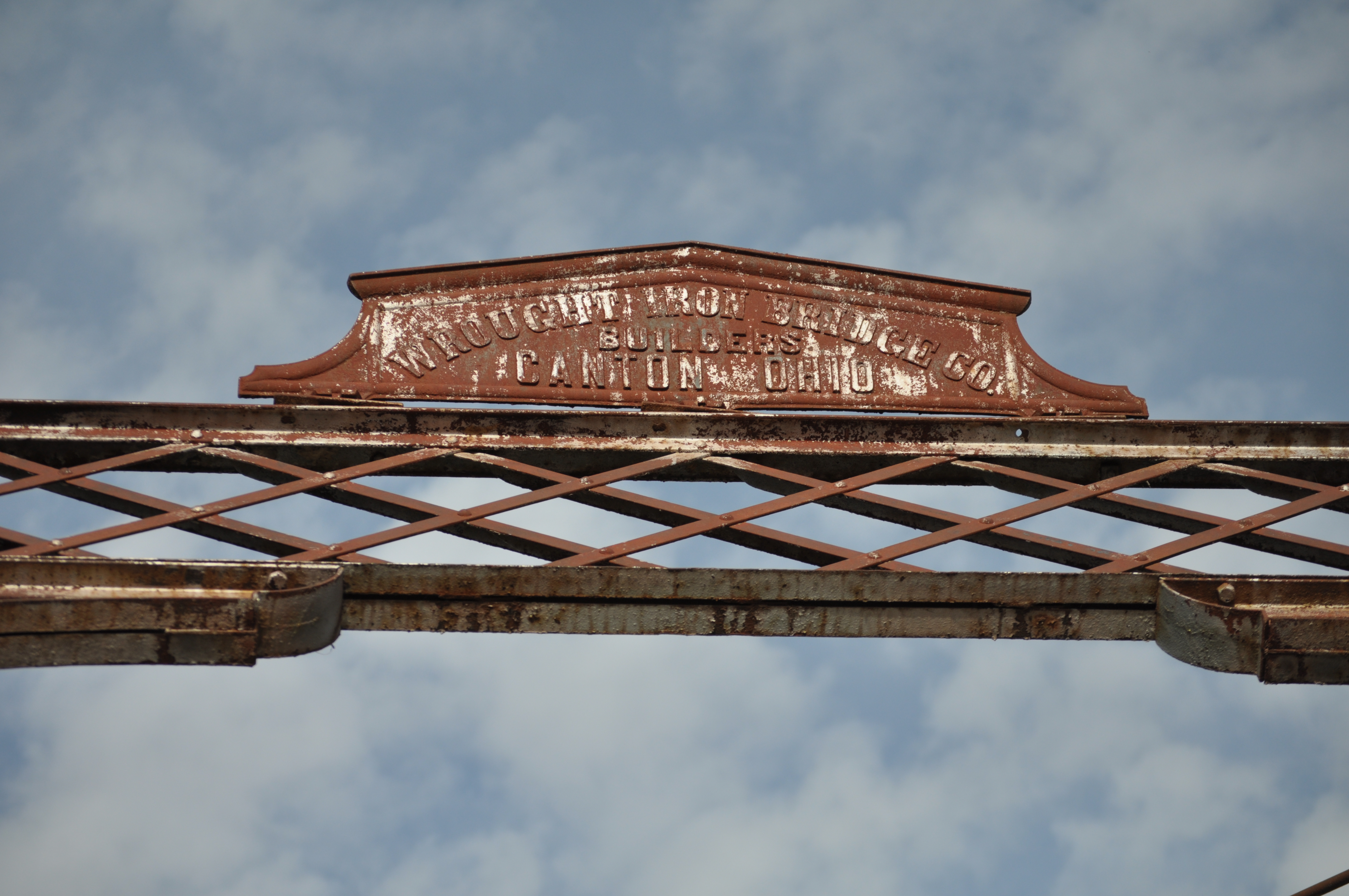
Sign, Wrought Iron Bridge Company

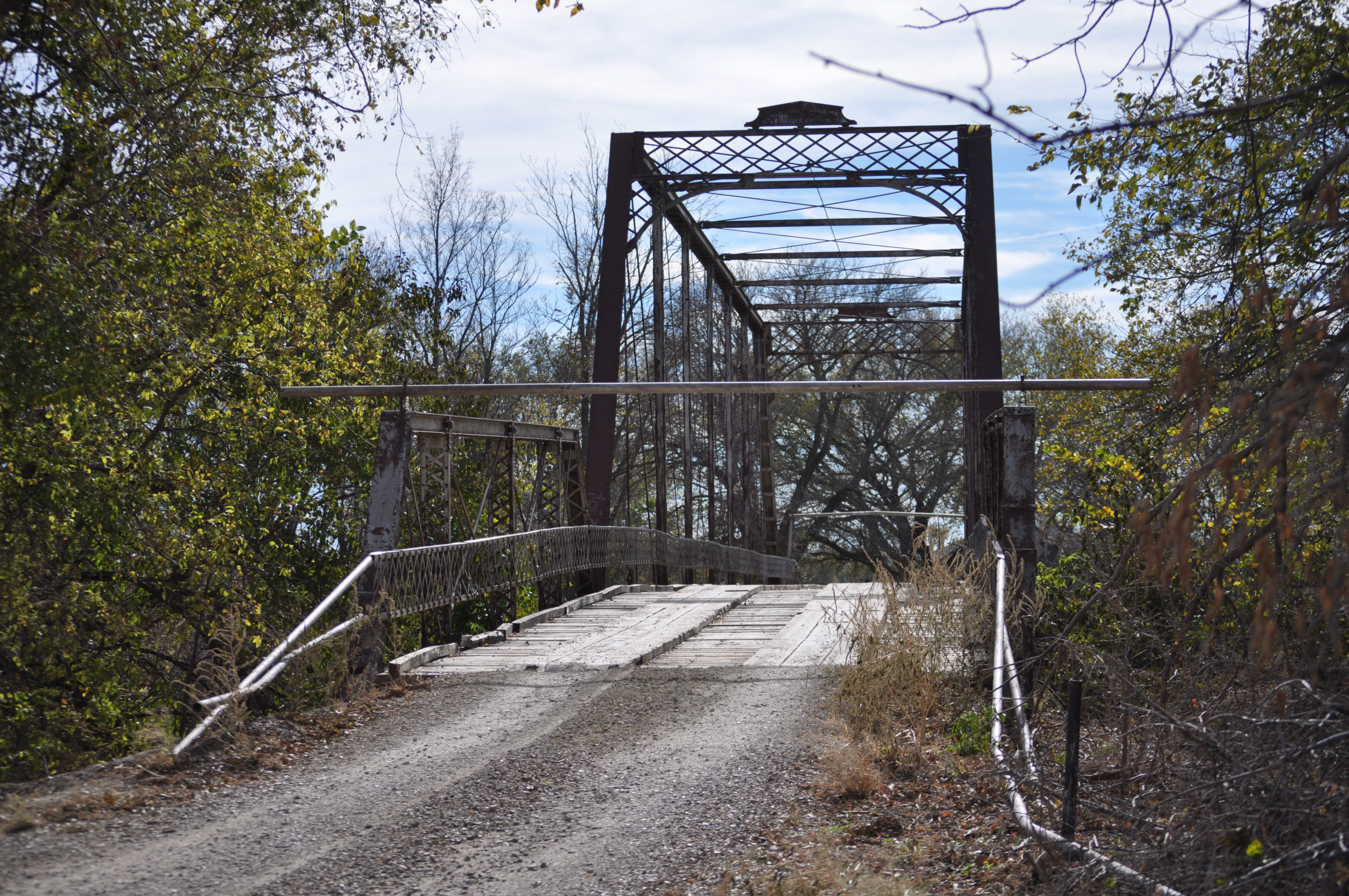
Walnut River bridge, near Douglass, Kansas

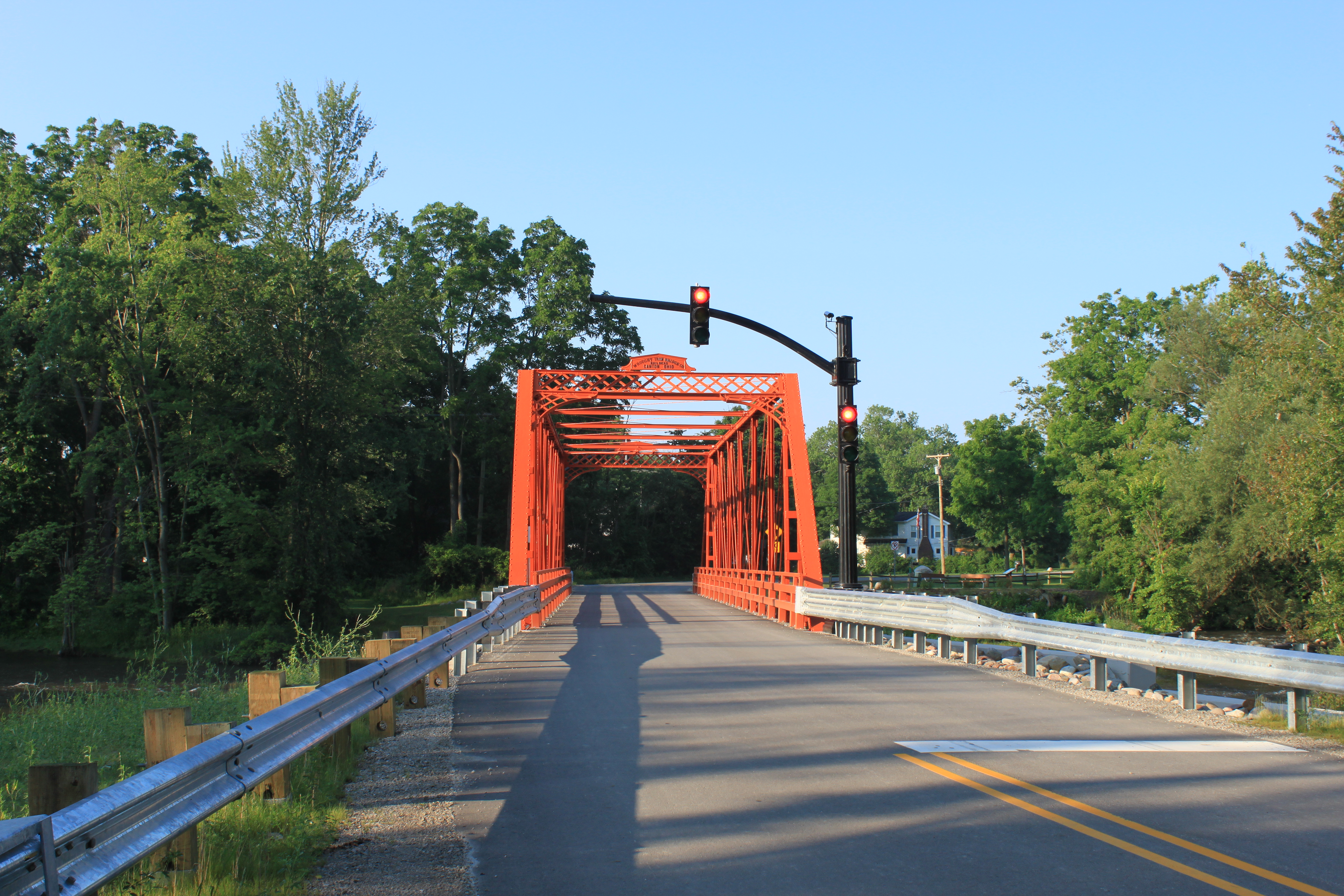
Delhi Bridge, Scio Township, Michigan

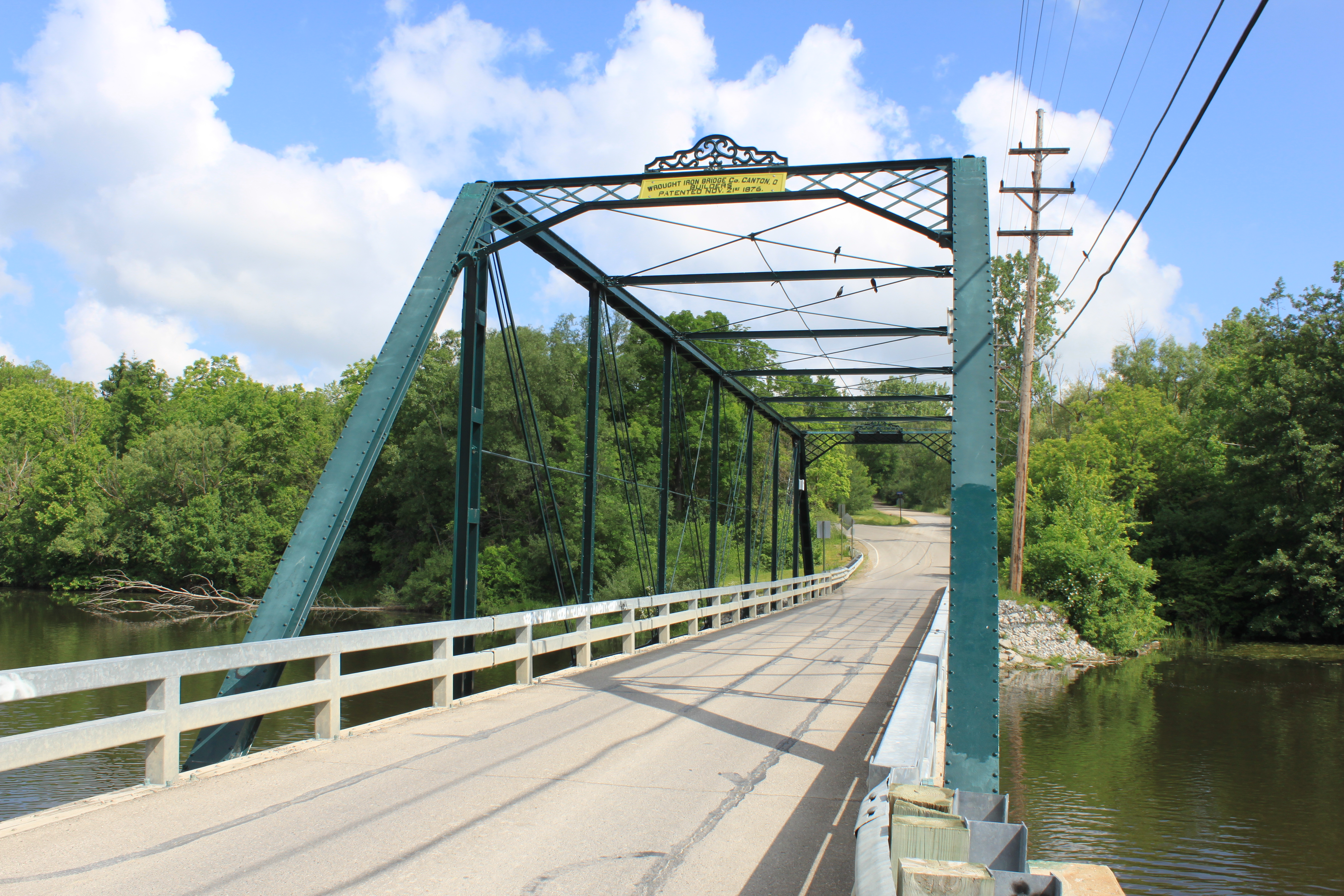
Maple/Foster Bridge, Barton Hills, Michigan

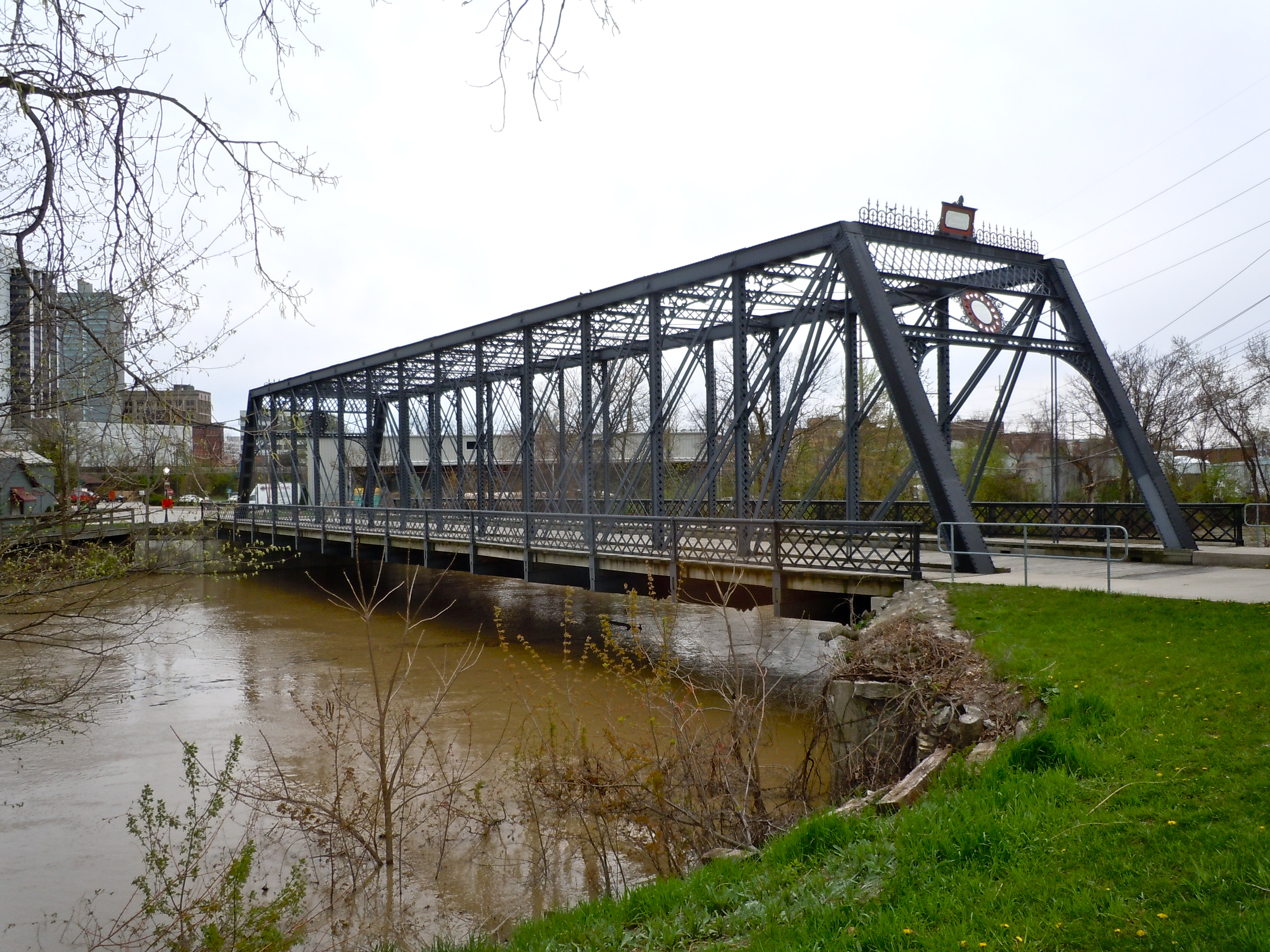
Wells Street Bridge, Fort Wayne, Indiana

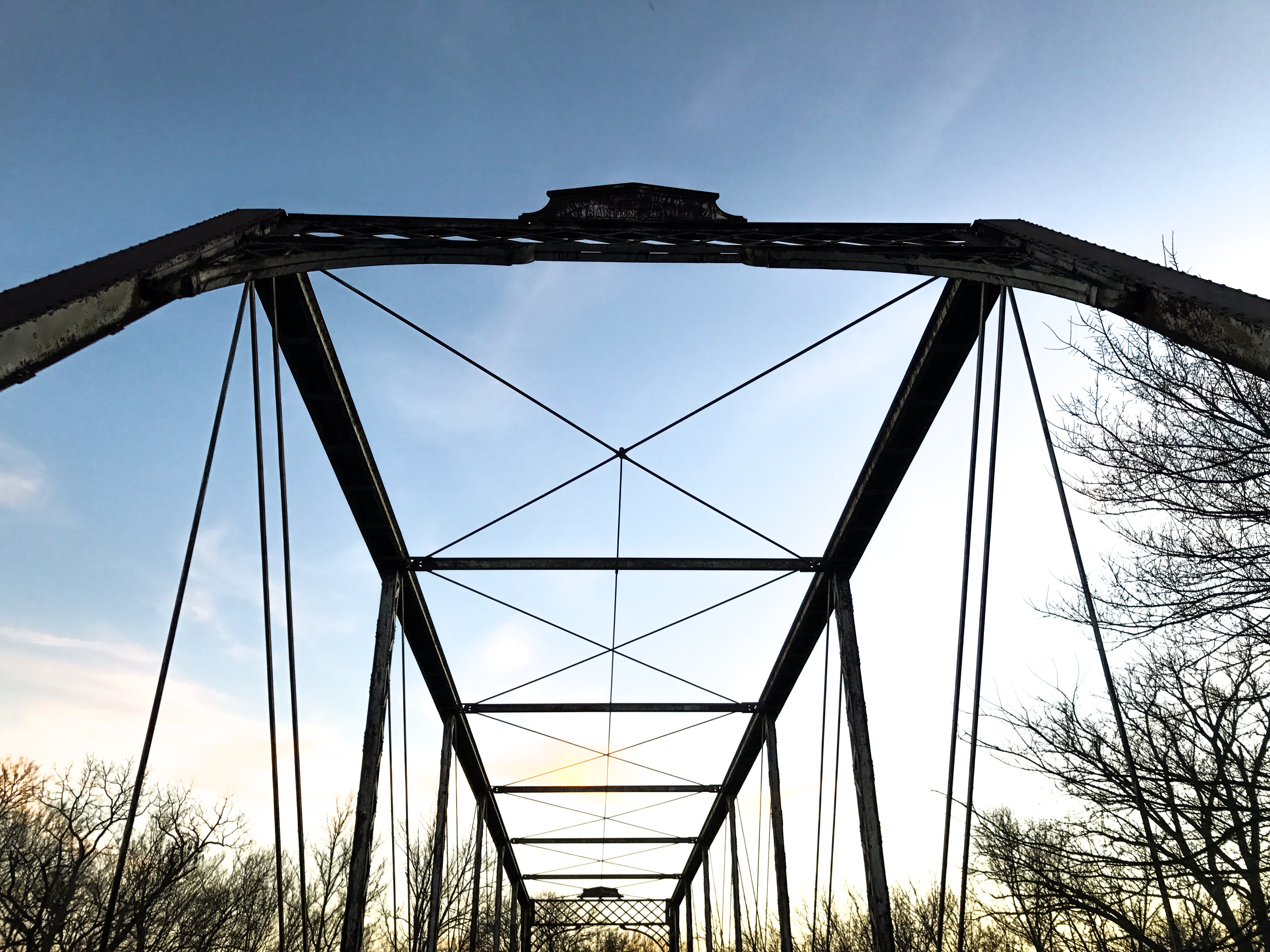
Walnut River Bridge, near Douglass Kansas

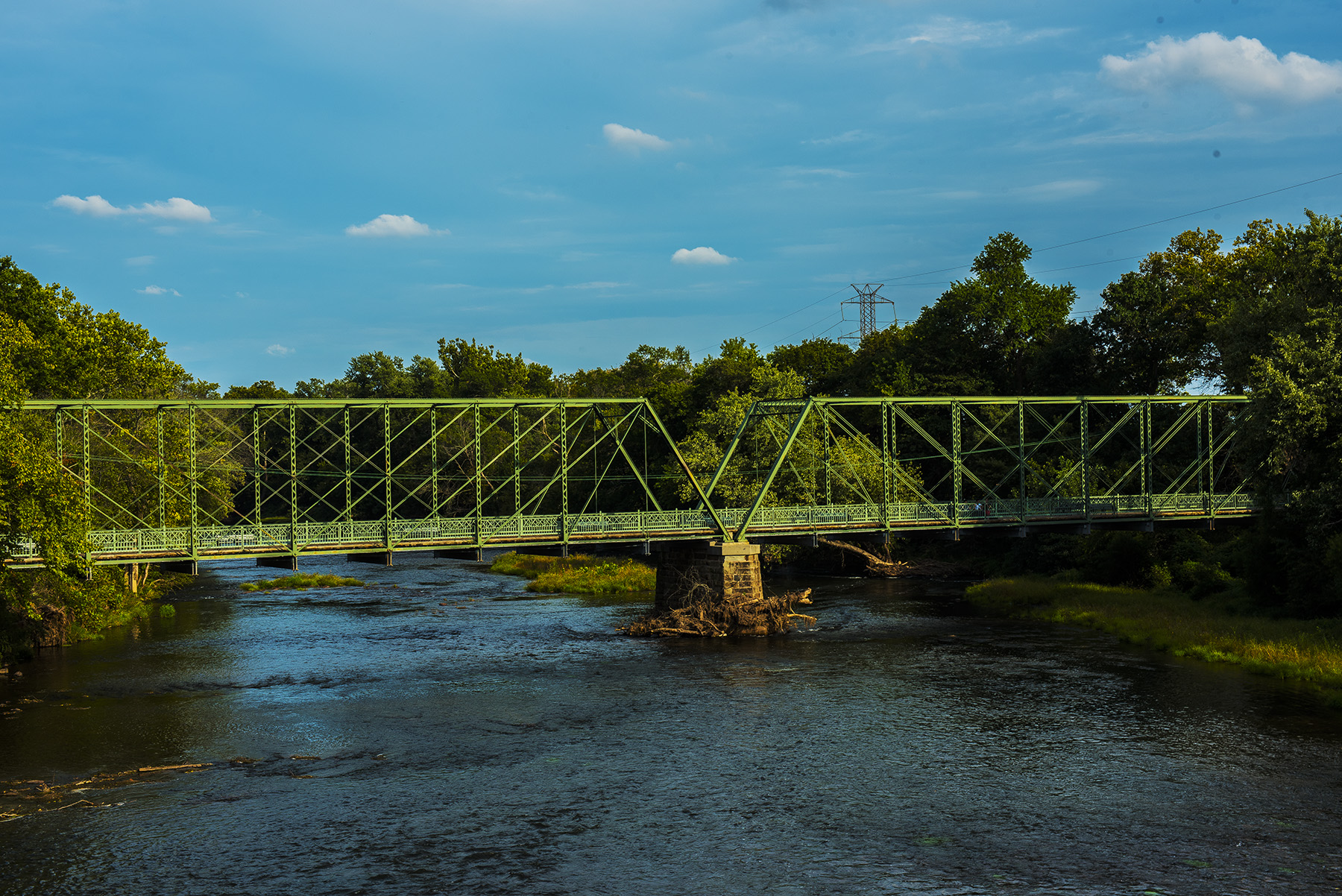
Nevius Street Bridge, Raritan, New Jersey

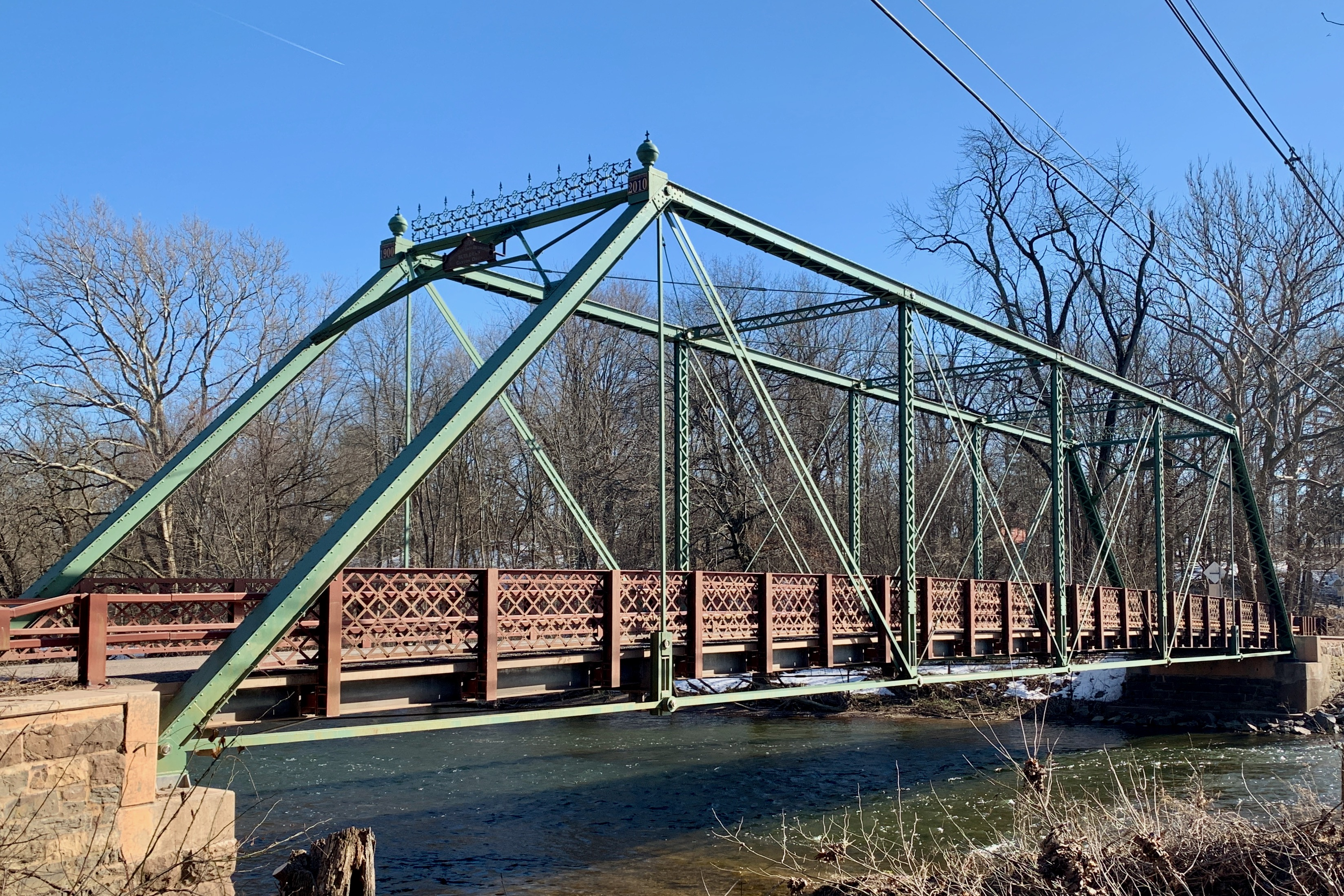
Rockafellows Mill Bridge, Rockefellows Mills, New Jersey

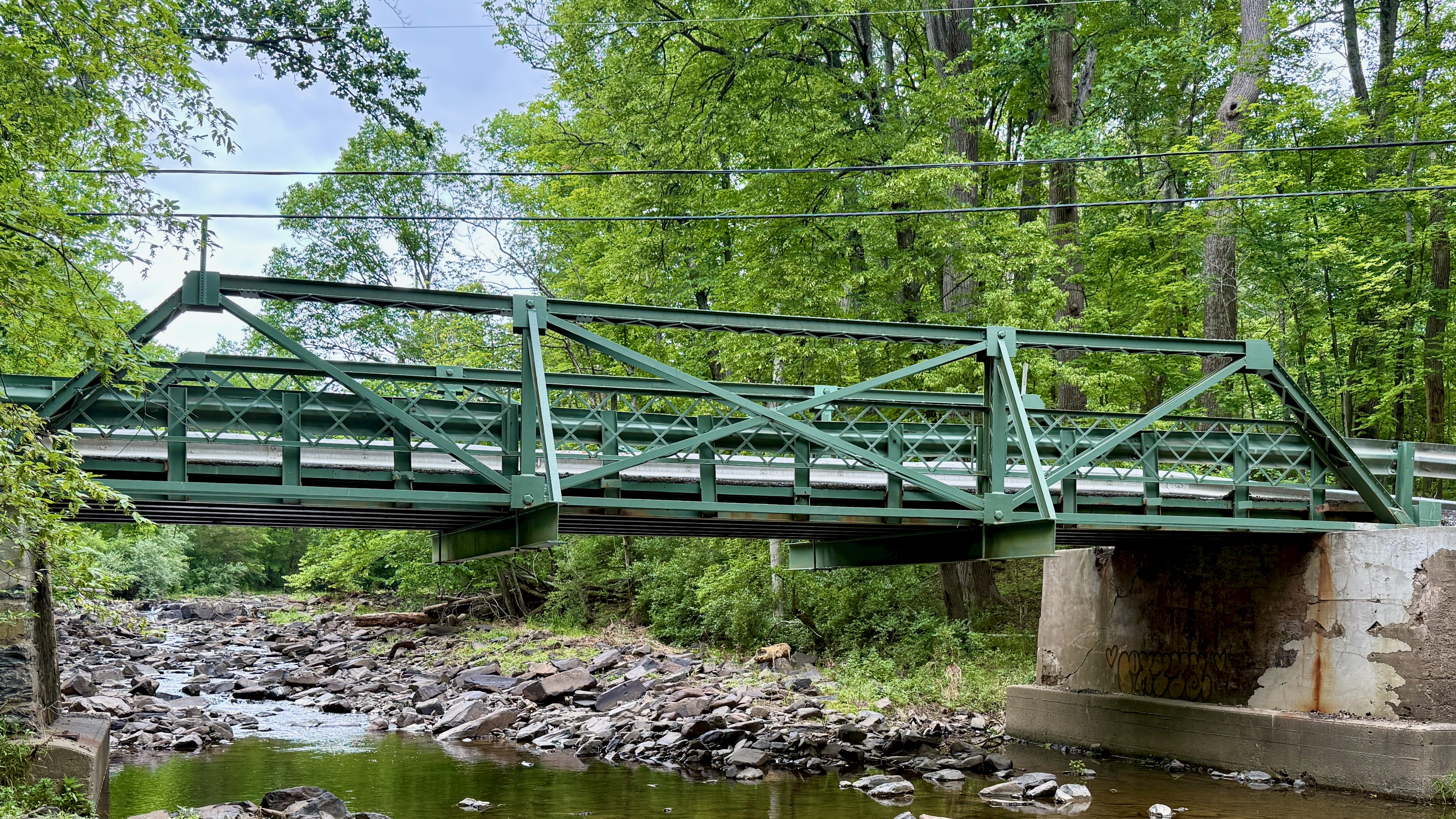
Old Mill Road truss bridge over the Wickecheoke Creek, Delaware Township, New Jersey

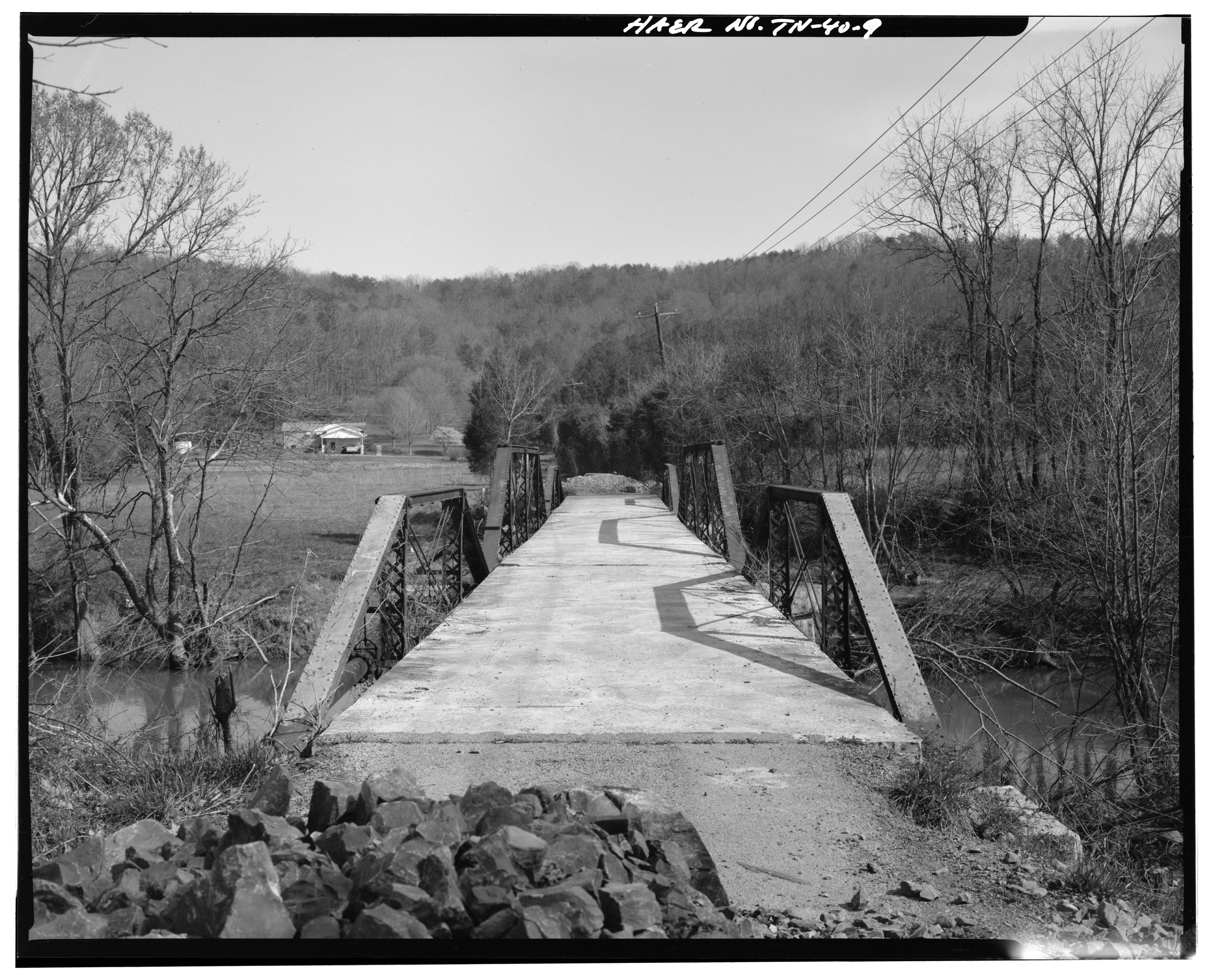
Lea Bridge, Candies Creek at Old Georgetown Road, Hopewell, Bradley County, Tennessee

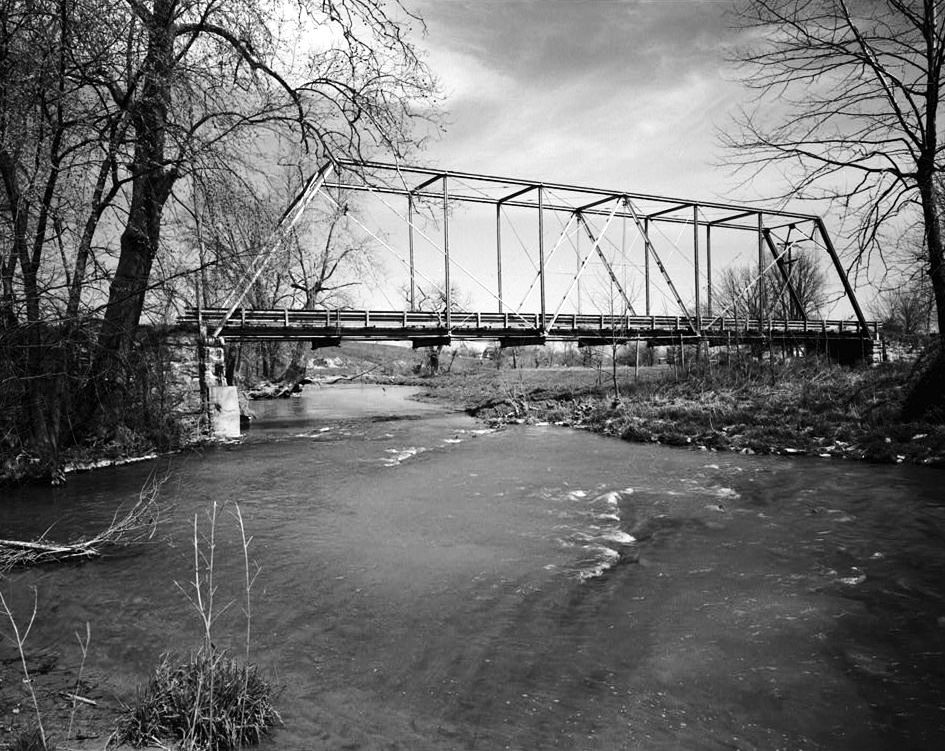
Linville Creek Bridge, Broadway, Virginia
