= Old Mill Road truss bridge over the Wickecheoke Creek =

- U.S. National Register of Historic Places
- New Jersey Register of Historic Places
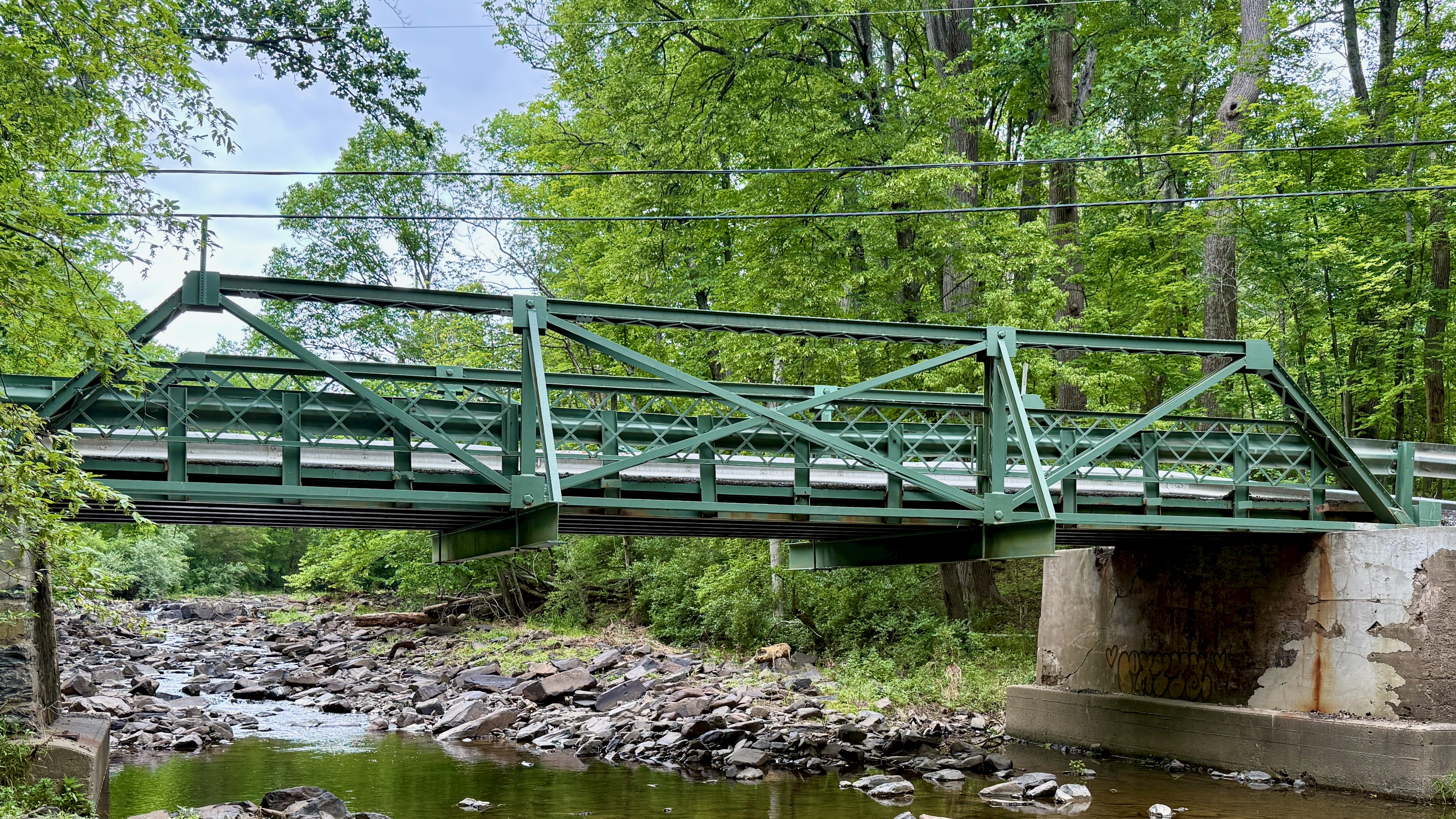

- Location within Hunterdon County, New Jersey Location within New Jersey Location within the United States
- Location: Old Mill Road over Wickecheoke Creek, Delaware Township, Hunterdon County, New Jersey
- Coordinates: 40°27′53″N 74°58′35″W
- Built: 1899
- Built by: Wrought Iron Bridge Company
- MPS: Historic Bridges of Delaware Township, Hunterdon County, New Jersey MPDF
- NRHP reference No.: 100011839
- NJRHP No.: 5983

Significant dates
- Added to NRHP: May 23, 2025
- Designated NJRHP: April 8, 2025

The Old Mill Road truss bridge over the Wickecheoke Creek is a historic Pratt truss bridge located in Delaware Township in Hunterdon County, New Jersey, United States. Built in 1899, it was added to the National Register of Historic Places on May 23, 2025, for its significance in engineering and transportation. It was listed as part of the Historic Bridges of Delaware Township, Hunterdon County, New Jersey Multiple Property Submission (MPS).

== History and description ==
The skewed, single-lane, single-span bridge was built in 1899 by the Wrought Iron Bridge Company of Canton, Ohio. It was built with steel made by the Jones and Laughlin Steel Company of Pittsburgh, Pennsylvania. The bridge is the oldest of the four that cross the Wickecheoke Creek in Delaware and Kingwood Townships.

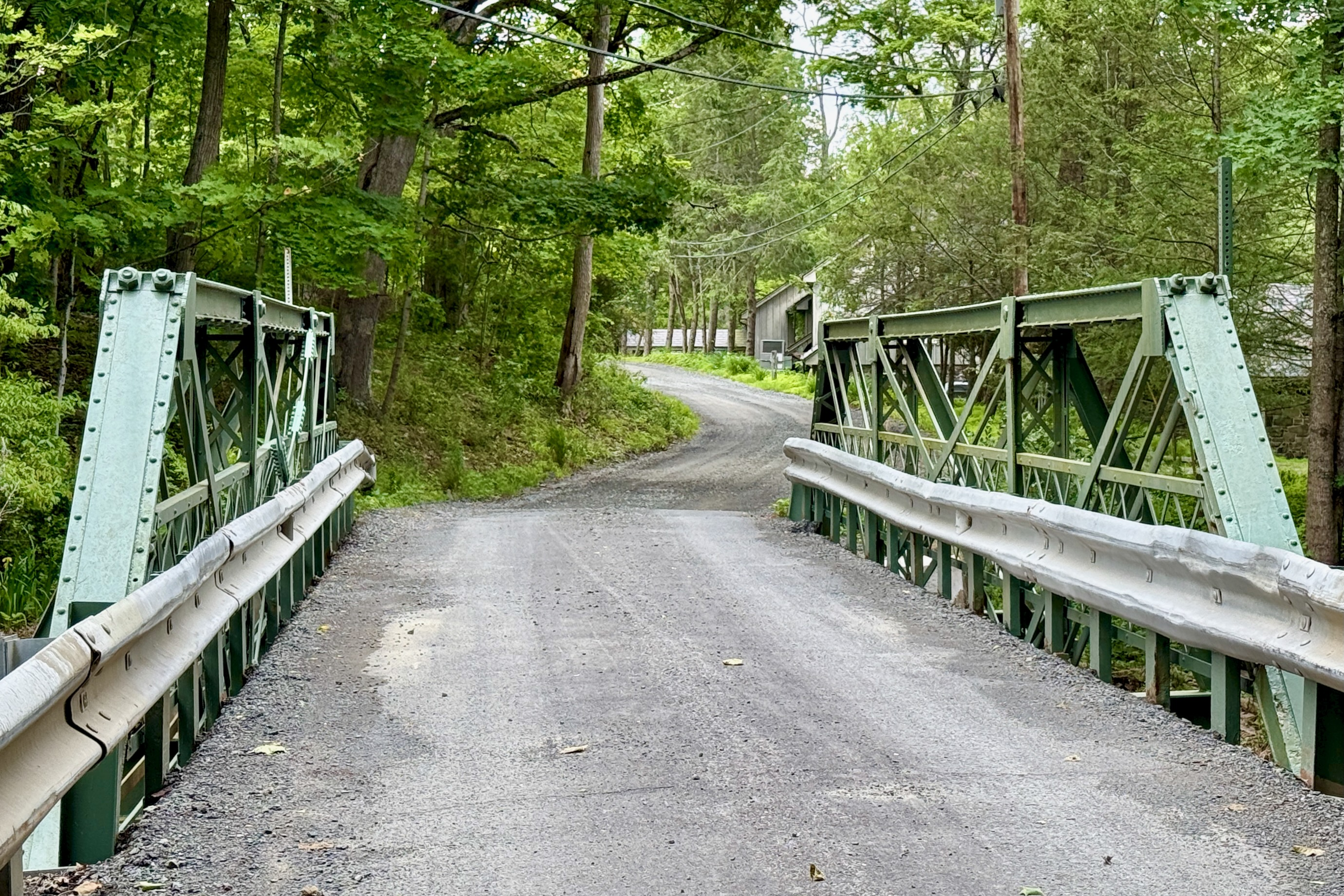
View of bridge looking east

== See also ==
- National Register of Historic Places listings in Hunterdon County, New Jersey
- List of bridges on the National Register of Historic Places in New Jersey
