= Blackfriars Street Bridge =

Bridge crossing the North Thames River in London, Ontario, Canada

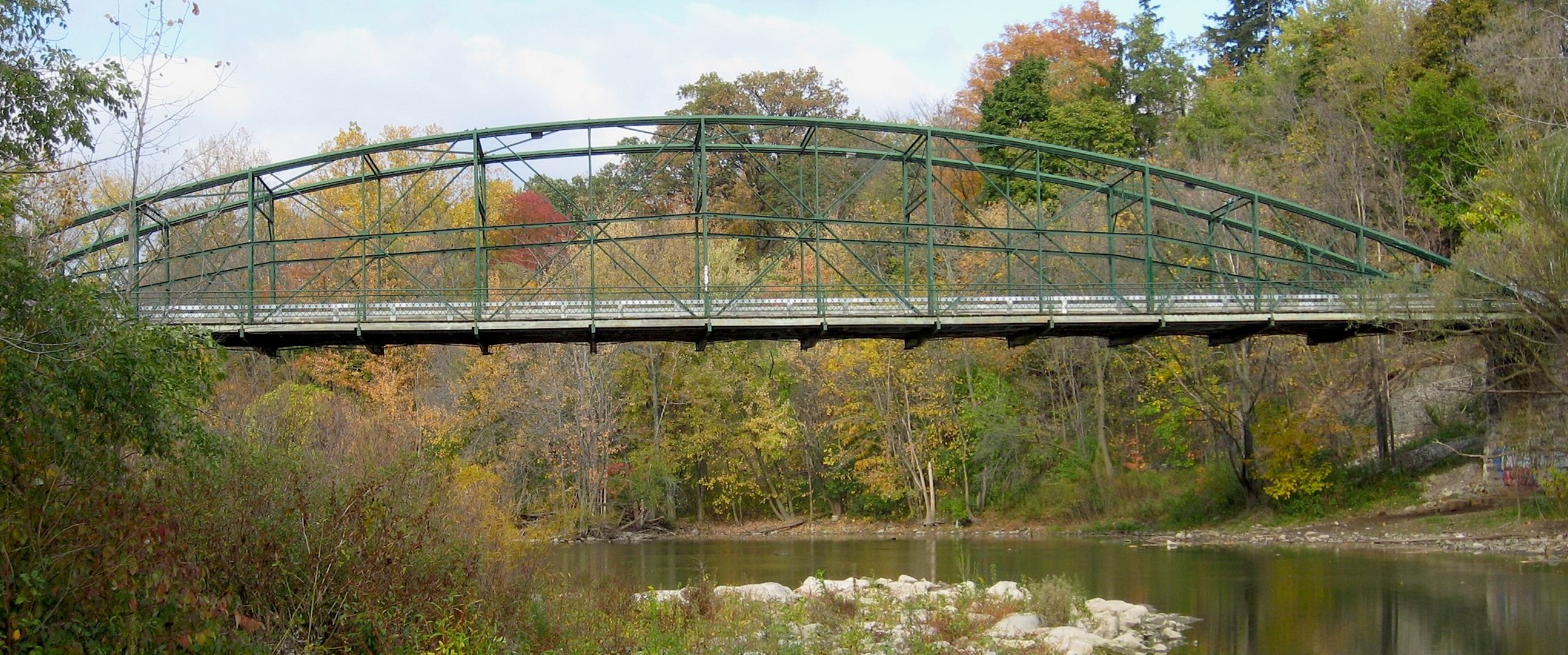
- Coordinates: 42°59′20″N 81°15′26″W
- Carries: 1 lane of roadway Pedestrians and bicycles
- Crosses: Thames River
- Locale: London, Ontario
- Owner: City of London

Characteristics
- Design: Bowstring truss Pin connections and lattice girders
- Material: Wrought iron, wood deck
- Total length: 212 ft; 65 m (unsupported length)

History
- Constructed by: Isaac Crouse
- Fabrication by: Wrought Iron Bridge Company
- Opened: 1875
- Rebuilt: 2018

National Historic Site of Canada
- Designated: September 8, 2008

Ontario Heritage Act
- Type: Bridge
- Designated: April 21, 1992

Location
- Interactive map of Blackfriars Street Bridge

Blackfriars Bridge in London, Ontario, Canada is a wrought iron bowstring arch through truss bridge, crossing the North Thames River. The bridge was constructed in 1875 and carries single-lane vehicles, bicycles and pedestrians from Blackfriars Street to Ridout Street North.

At 216 feet (66 meters) it is the longest working span of that kind in North America.

== Description ==
The Blackfriars Bridge was the oldest wrought iron bridge in North America until 2017 when it was rebuilt and branded as "heritage" it is still used for vehicular traffic. The construction of the bridge was made in a bowstring truss design that uses pin connections and lattice girders.The deck had significant changes made, so much so that they had to add courses of brick work to the abutments to make up for the lack of depth in the deck.

The deck surface is no longer made of renewable planking: there are no longer a double file of approximately 1,500 8 ft 2'x4'pressure treated Douglas Fir, each, on edge, upon a now nonexistent framework of nine longitudinally laid stringers of 1 ft iron I-beams, topped with bolted-on wooden cladding, whose ends rest on the two abutments. Attached beneath these are 15 transverse floor-beams, from which vertical lattice pillars, under tension, translate the live thrusts of traffic to the bowed upper chord, which transfers this back as tension along the bottom-chord "string" of the bow. This bottom chord consists of two sets of four 10 cm x 3 cm wrought-iron eyebars, running along, outside, both sides of the deck. Although originally two-lane, due to the weight and frequency of modern traffic, the Blackfriars is at present one-way single-lane for east-bound vehicular traffic with an additional bike lane. It is also open to pedestrian traffic.

The Bridge is sited at the east end of Blackfriars Street, which turns sharply south and up a slight grade, becoming Ridout Street upon crossing it. To the bridge's west is the lower ground of the previous town of Petersville, protected by an extensive dike embankment, due to a history of flooding; the dike is known locally as a 'breakwater'. To its east a terrace rises above the North Thames River to central London. The river there is bordered on both sides by extensive bicycle and walking paths now known as the TVP, or Thames Valley Parkway, a multi-use recreational trail. The Bridge is well framed by a variety of second-growth trees.

== History ==
The Blackfriars Bridge was manufactured by the Wrought Iron Bridge Company (WIBC) of Canton, Ohio, although erected by local London contractor Isaac Crouse. There is evidence for its being prototypical for a revised design by WIBC, incorporating a double-panel web. The bridge is the successor to a series of fixed, wooden structures at the site since 1831, which were damaged mainly by spring freshets of the river.

It is the northernmost and oldest of a company of eight bridges of different ages, constructions and uses, surrounding the confluence of the North Thames and Thames rivers, which fixes the historic center of London.

The significance of the bridge is due to the age, type, material and rarity. According to bridge historian Nathan Holth,

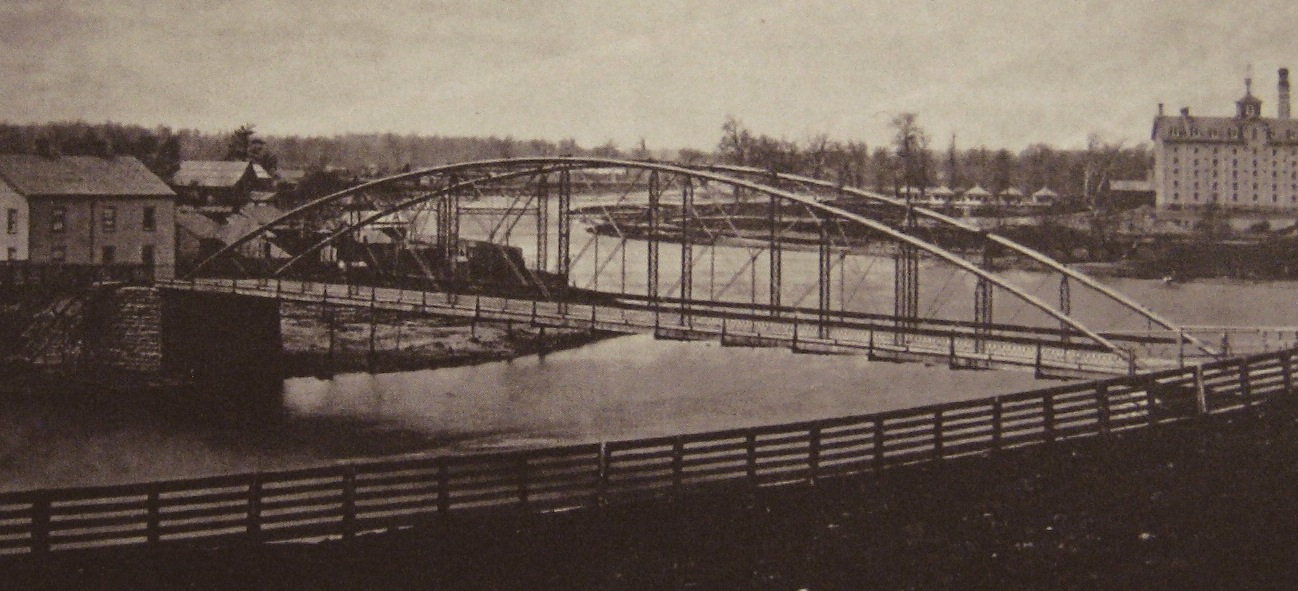
ca 1878: Blackfriars Bridge from southeast; Petersville left, original Carling brewery right

Bowstring bridges are one of the rarest types of truss bridges, and most date in the 1870s. They fell out of favor due to the limited weight they could support. Any bowstring truss bridge that survives today is a miracle. Truss bridges are always intricate structures, but bowstring trusses are even more so. There [are] lattice, v-lacing, and members all over. This large amount of complexity is balanced by the simple, graceful appearance of the arched top chord. The result is a bridge with incomparable beauty and appeal. Among the rarest and oldest bridges in Canada is this breathtaking iron bowstring truss. Keystone Columns form the top chord. A sidewalk on the south side appears to be original.

It has been designated a historic structure under Part IV of the Ontario Heritage Act.

=== Temporary closure to vehicular traffic ===
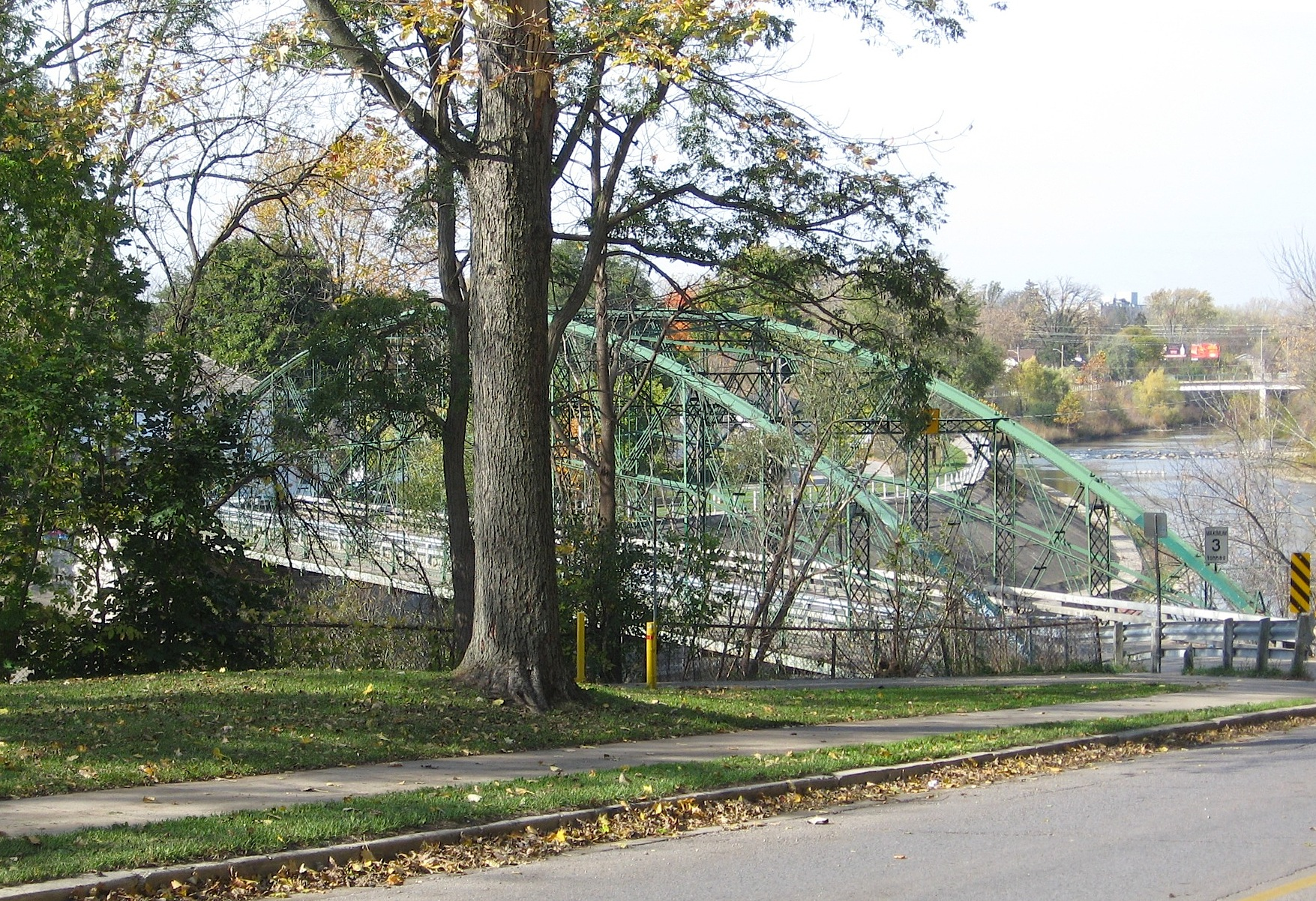
2007: Bridge from southeast; showing west bank modern dike, Oxford Street bridge upstream, north - photo PM

The bridge was closed to all traffic on 13 May 2013, for the purpose of extensive infrastructural assessment and repair, with plans to re-open it by August 2013. Due to the extent and cost (approximately $3M) of repairs required, the closure was extended indefinitely, and subsequently re-opened to pedestrian traffic in December 2013. Access was restricted to a pedestrian pathway by using temporary fencing, pending an environmental assessment to determine whether it will be feasible to re-open the bridge to vehicular traffic. It was re-opened on December 1, 2018. After being closed again to cars in April 2020, it was re-opened on November 8, 2021.

=== Restoration ===
In 2017, a $8.6-million plan was started, for a rebuild of the bridge.

On November 27, 2017, the bridge was cut in half, and lifted to the banks of the Thames, for moving to an off site location for refurbishment. After one year of rehabilitation, the Blackfriars Bridge was reopened to pedestrians, motorists and cyclists immediately following a grand opening celebration on Saturday, December 1, 2018.

== Natural and cultural aspects ==
Much of the beauty and appeal of the bridge is its appearance of floating (from many profile views up and downstream on both banks of the gently winding river). That is owed to its strung-bow shape and its light placement at its very tips upon modest granite abutments — a feature rare among more modern tied-arch bridges. These abutments bear the passive vertical load of the open structure itself. However, the varying 'live' thrust forces of traffic downward on its deck are translated by the bowed chord above into horizontal tensions along the longitudinal iron eyebars of the 'string' or bottom chord running parallel to the deck.

The Blackfriars Bridge has figured in various artistic works, visual and literary, including a series of stained glass windows by Ted Goodden. Nathan Holth praises the City of London and the Province of Ontario for maintaining its old iron bridges. Regarding the nearby, larger pony-truss Kensington Bridge he praises the city for "keeping the Thames River looking wild and natural," even near its center, with the look of "a rural bridge in an urban environment, which further enhances the beauty of the bridge", a remark that would apply as well to the Blackfriars. With recent improvement of the rivers, wild nature seems to confirm the point. (See, below, resident Great blue heron in winter.)

== See also ==
- List of bridges in Canada
