= John Basilone Veterans Memorial Bridge =

Coordinates: 40.5647°N 74.6368°W

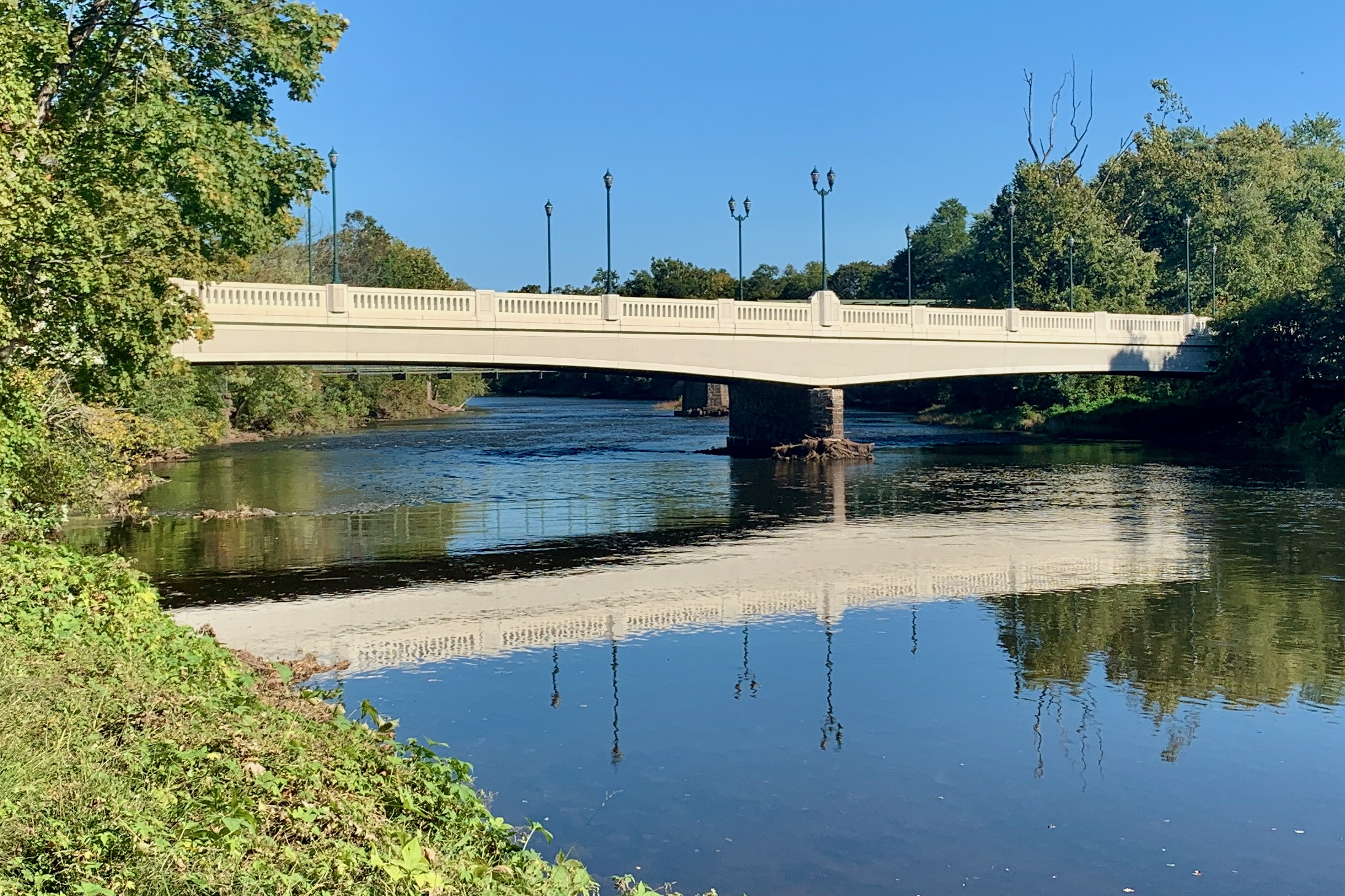
John Basilone Veterans Memorial Bridge in 2020

The John Basilone Veterans Memorial Bridge is a bridge in New Jersey that crosses the Raritan River in Somerset County in Raritan and Hillsborough. The bridge was built in 2005 to replace the smaller Nevius Street Bridge built in 1886. The Nevius Street Bridge today functions as a pedestrian bridge. The bridge connects First Avenue and what used to be the short one way block of Lyman Street in Raritan with River Road in Hillsborough. After crossing into Hillsborough, the road curves to meet up with the old alignment with the Nevius Street Bridge. The bridge is named for local World War II hero, John Basilone. The bridge has a pedestrian tunnel underneath its northern approach, as part of the Raritan River Greenway.

== See also ==
- List of crossings of the Raritan River
