= Strimple's Mill Road Bridge over Lockatong Creek =

- U.S. National Register of Historic Places
- New Jersey Register of Historic Places
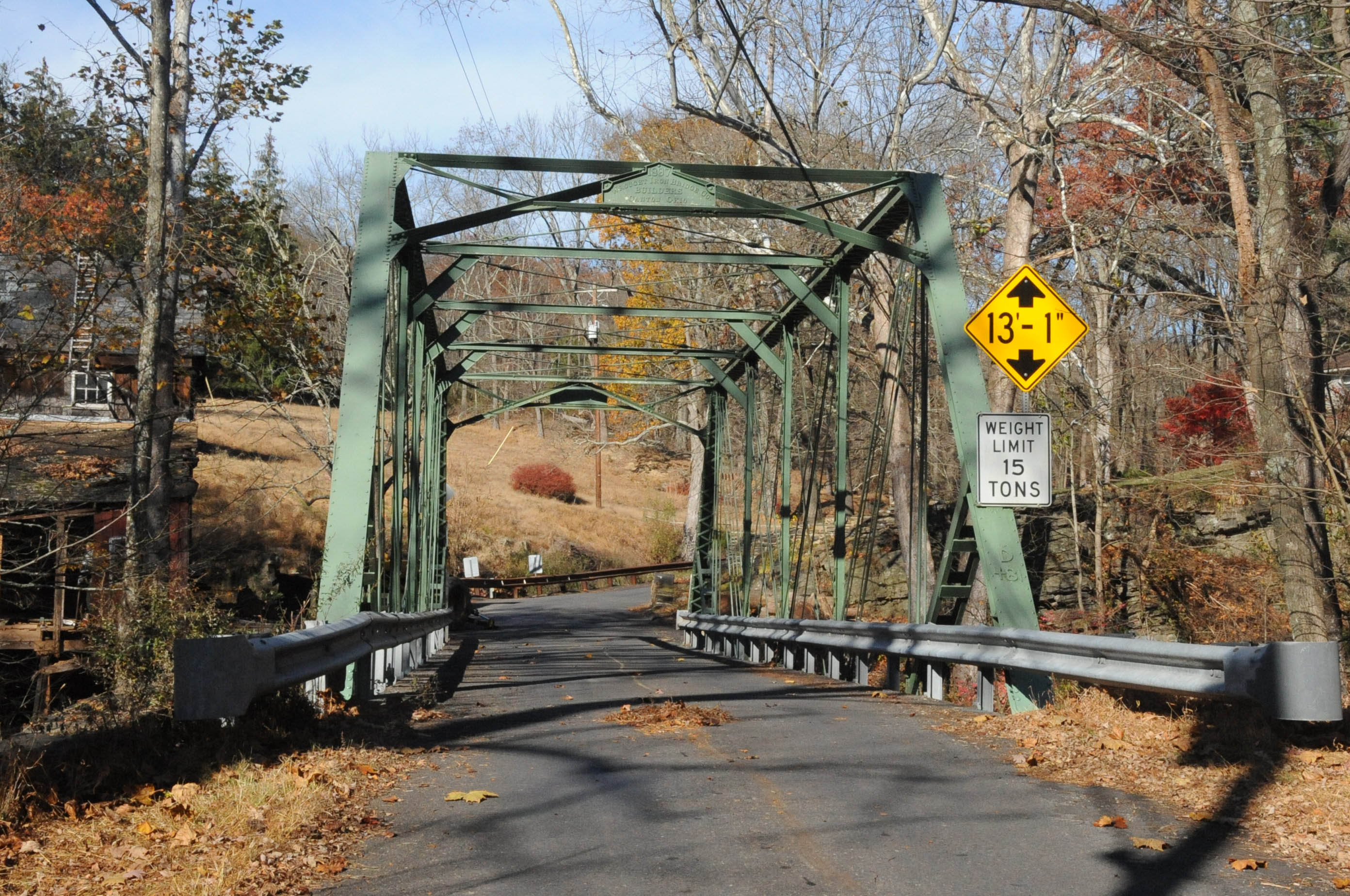

- Location within Hunterdon County, New Jersey Location within New Jersey Location within the United States
- Location: Strimple's Mill Road, Delaware Township, New Jersey
- Coordinates: 40°26′13.6″N 75°00′42.5″W
- Built: 1897
- Built by: Wrought Iron Bridge Company
- MPS: Historic Bridges of Delaware Township, Hunterdon County, New Jersey MPDF
- NRHP reference No.: 16000693
- NJRHP No.: 3471

Significant dates
- Added to NRHP: October 4, 2016
- Designated NJRHP: August 3, 2016

The Strimple's Mill Road Bridge over Lockatong Creek is a historic Pratt thru truss bridge located in Delaware Township of Hunterdon County, New Jersey, United States. Built in 1897 by the Wrought Iron Bridge Company of Canton, Ohio, it was added to the National Register of Historic Places on October 4, 2016, for its significance in engineering. It was listed as part of the Historic Bridges of Delaware Township, Hunterdon County, New Jersey Multiple Property Submission (MPS).

The 93 foot (28 m) long single-span pin-connected wrought iron bridge crosses the Lockatong Creek in the northwest corner of the township. According to the nomination form, the bridge features details such as a "crow’s foot" vertical hanger and “reversed” vertical hangers.

== See also ==
- National Register of Historic Places listings in Hunterdon County, New Jersey
- List of bridges on the National Register of Historic Places in New Jersey
