= Linville Creek Bridge =

- U.S. National Register of Historic Places
- Virginia Landmarks Register
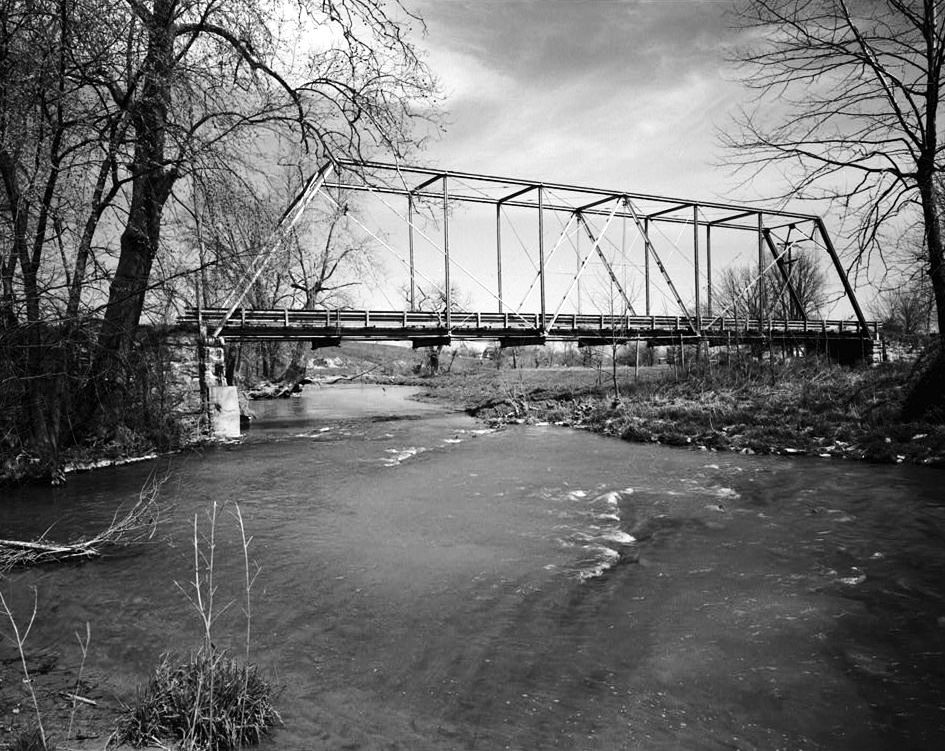
- Linville Creek Bridge, HAER Photo, April 1994

- Location within Virginia Location within the United States
- Location: South of Broadway on SR 1421, near Broadway, Virginia
- Coordinates: 38°36′22″N 78°48′11″W
- Area: less than one acre
- Built: 1898
- Built by: Wrought Iron Bridge Co.
- Architectural style: Hybrid Pratt-Warren Truss
- NRHP reference No.: 78003042
- VLR No.: 177-5001

Significant dates
- Added to NRHP: April 15, 1978
- Designated VLR: November 15, 1977

Linville Creek Bridge is a historic Thacher truss bridge spanning Linville Creek just upstream of the Shenandoah River near Broadway, Rockingham County, Virginia. It was built by the Wrought Iron Bridge Company in 1898. It is a single span, measuring 135 feet 11 inches (41.43 m) long. This bridge was formerly identified as a hybrid Whipple, incorporating aspects of both the double-intersection Pratt and the double-intersection Warren. The structure in actuality is a Thacher truss, a hybrid configuration incorporating elements of the Pratt, Warren, Fink, and Bollman trusses that was first patented by Edwin Thacher in 1883. Its unusual configuration and the bewildering number of descriptions that have been applied to it merely reinforce its position as a bridge that is a rare survivor of an uncommon form.

The bridge was listed on the Virginia Landmarks Register in 1977. The bridge was listed on the National Register of Historic Places in 1978.

== See also ==
- List of bridges documented by the Historic American Engineering Record in Virginia
- List of bridges on the National Register of Historic Places in Virginia
