= Chain Lakes Bridge =

- U.S. National Register of Historic Places
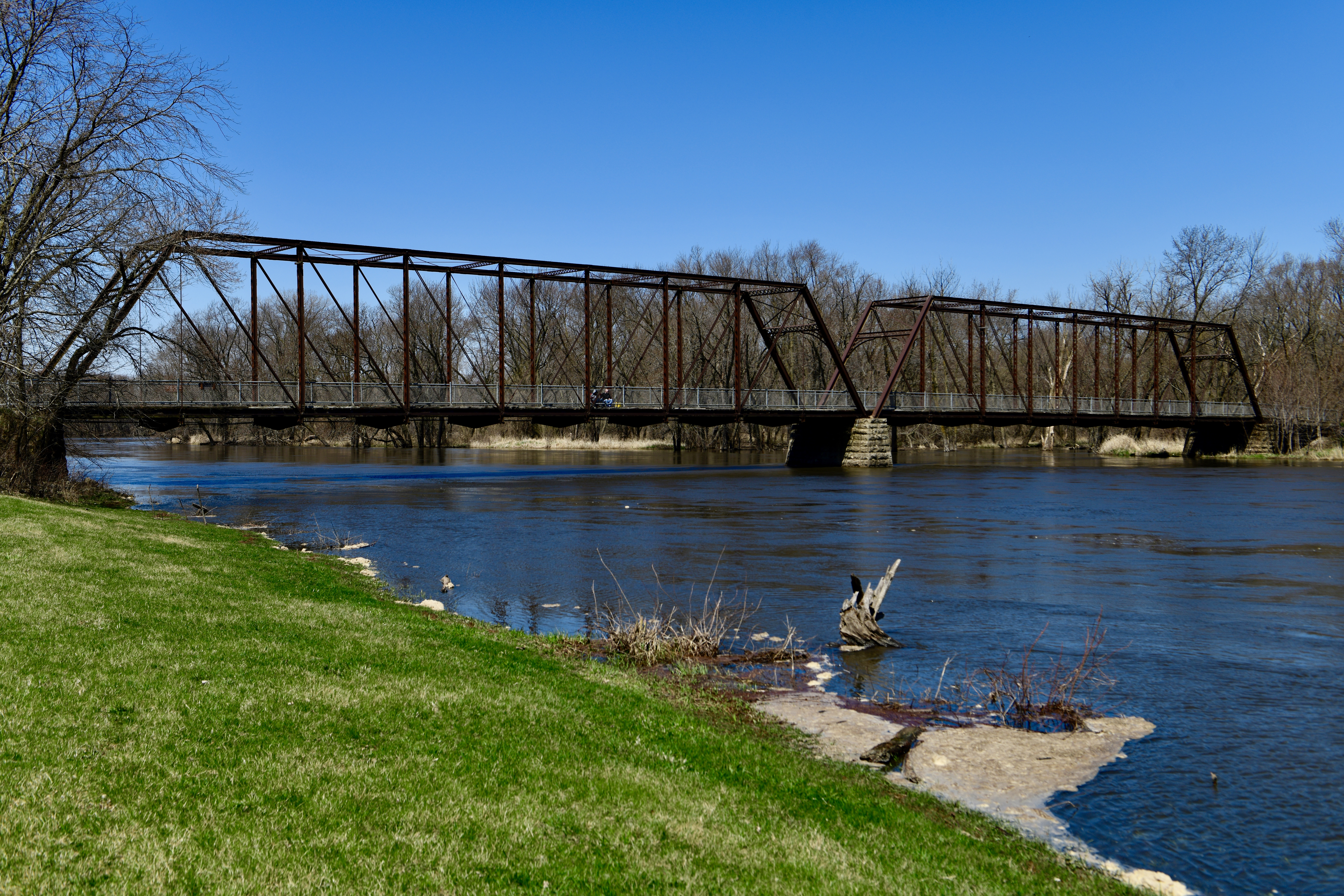

- Location within Iowa Location within the United States
- Location: Pedestrian trail over the Cedar River Cedar River
- Nearest city: Palo, Iowa
- Coordinates: 42°03′00.6″N 91°46′31.9″W
- Built: 1884
- Architect: Wrought Iron Bridge Company
- Architectural style: Pratt through truss
- MPS: Highway Bridges of Iowa MPS
- NRHP reference No.: 98000529
- Added to NRHP: May 15, 1998

The Chain Lakes Bridge is a historic structure located southeast of Palo, Iowa, United States. It carries a pedestrian trail for 370 feet (110 m) over the Cedar River. The Linn County Board of Supervisors began planning for this span in the early 1880s. They appropriated $20,000 for this two-span Pratt through truss The Wrought Iron Bridge Company of Canton, Ohio, which built bridges in the county since 1879, completed this structure in 1884. The bridge was listed on the National Register of Historic Places in 1998. While it was built to carry vehicular traffic, it is now in a nature preserve maintained by the Linn County Conservation Board.

== See also ==
- List of bridges on the National Register of Historic Places in Iowa
- National Register of Historic Places listings in Linn County, Iowa
