= Nevius Street Bridge =

- Raritan Bridge
- U.S. National Register of Historic Places
- New Jersey Register of Historic Places
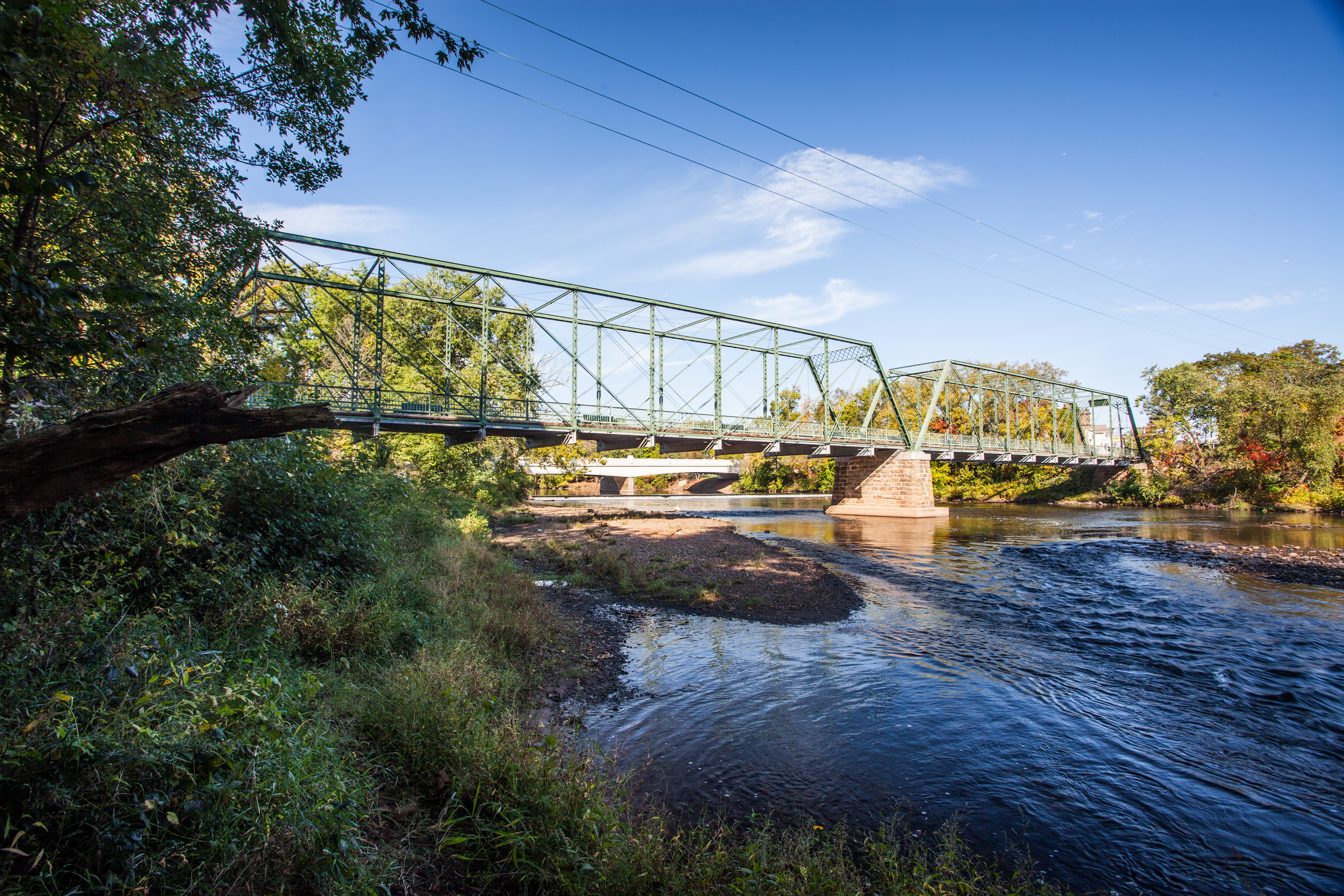
- Nevius Street Bridge, 2012

- Location within Somerset County, New Jersey Location within New Jersey Location within the United States
- Location: Nevius Street over the Raritan River, Hillsborough Township and Raritan Borough
- Coordinates: 40°33′53″N 74°38′9″W
- Built: 1886
- Built by: Wrought Iron Bridge Company
- Architectural style: Pratt through-truss
- MPS: Metal Truss Bridges in Somerset County
- NRHP reference No.: 92001526
- NJRHP No.: 2526

Significant dates
- Added to NRHP: November 12, 1992
- Designated NJRHP: September 11, 1992

The Nevius Street Bridge is a double intersection Pratt truss bridge that once carried car traffic across the Raritan River between Hillsborough Township and Raritan Borough in Somerset County, New Jersey, United States. The bridge, described using its historic name, Raritan Bridge, was added to the National Register of Historic Places on November 12, 1992, for its engineering and method of construction. It is part of the Metal Truss Bridges in Somerset County Multiple Property Submission (MPS).

== History ==
In the 1840s, a wooden bridge crossed at the current location. The current 150-foot-long (46 m) bridge was built in 1886 by the Wrought Iron Bridge Company of Canton, Ohio. The construction of the nearby John Basilone Veterans Memorial Bridge replaced the Nevius Street Bridge in 2005. The bridge now serves as a pedestrian bridge, connecting River Road in Hillsborough with the Raritan River Greenway.

The Raritan Water Power Canal is located at the north end of the bridge. The water pumping station built c. 1900 by James B. Duke and the canal hydroelectric power plant are not part of the NRHP listing, but are noted in the description section.

== Gallery ==
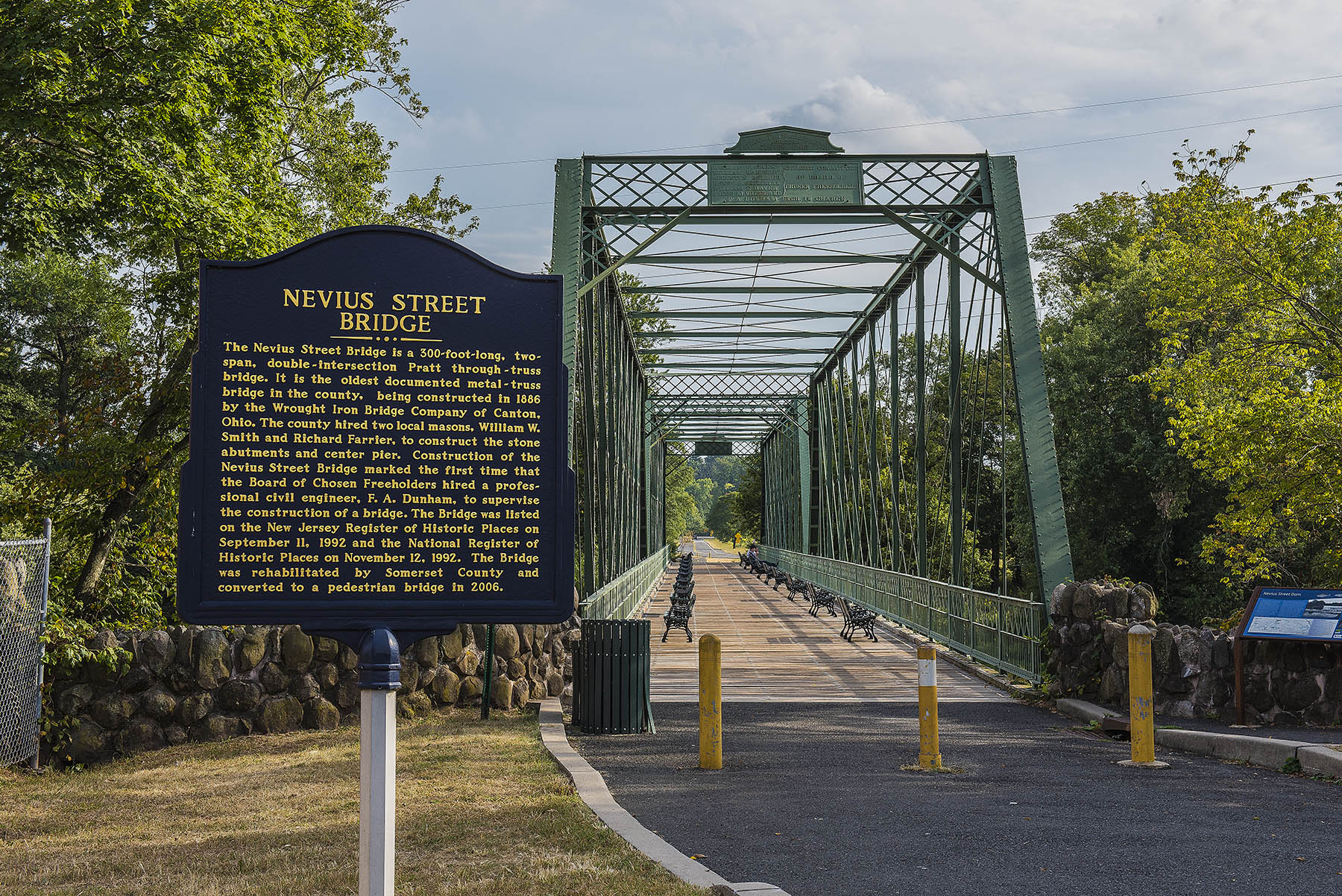
Somerset County historical information, 2016

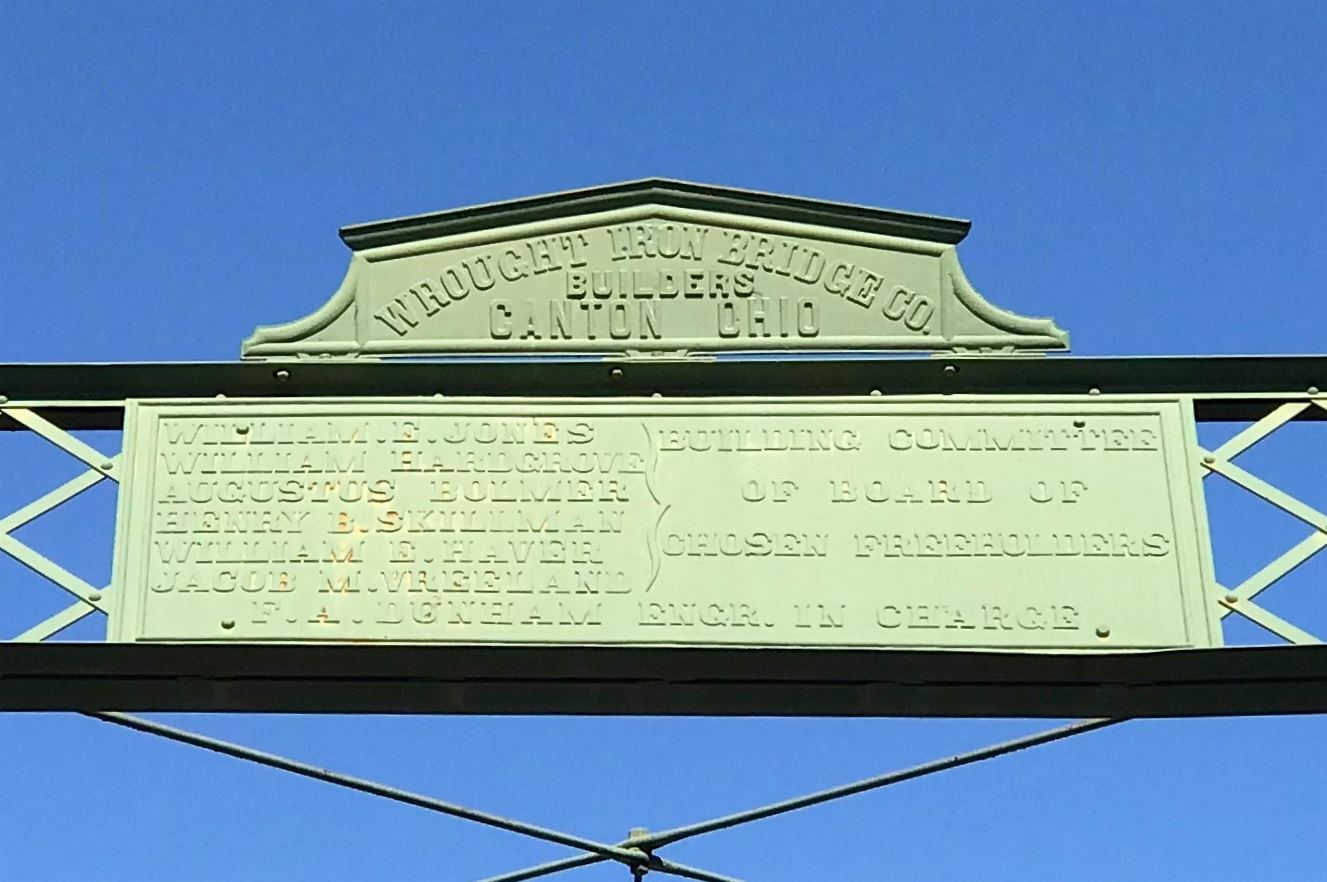
Wrought Iron Bridge Company nameplate

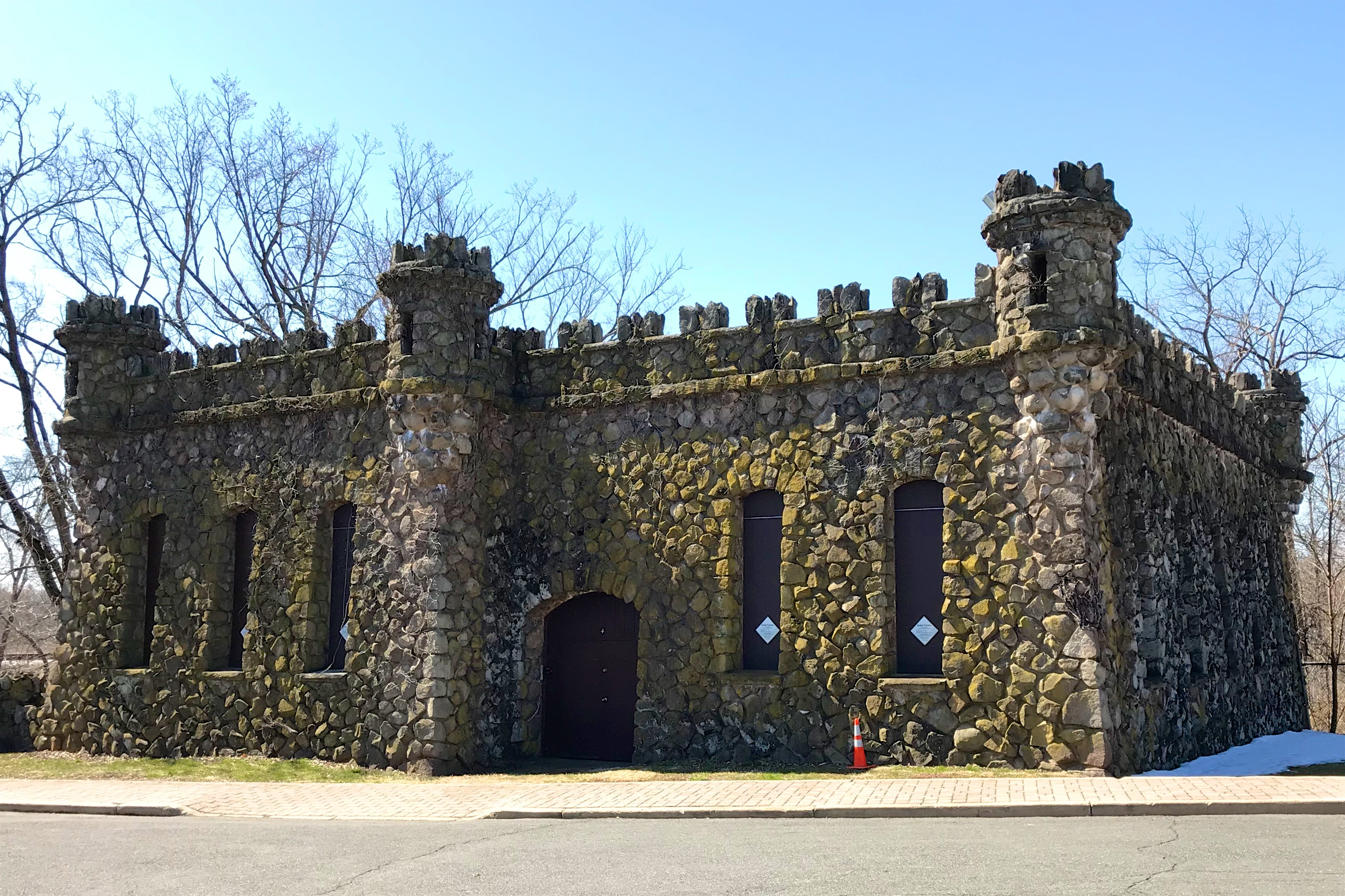
Water pumping station, 2018

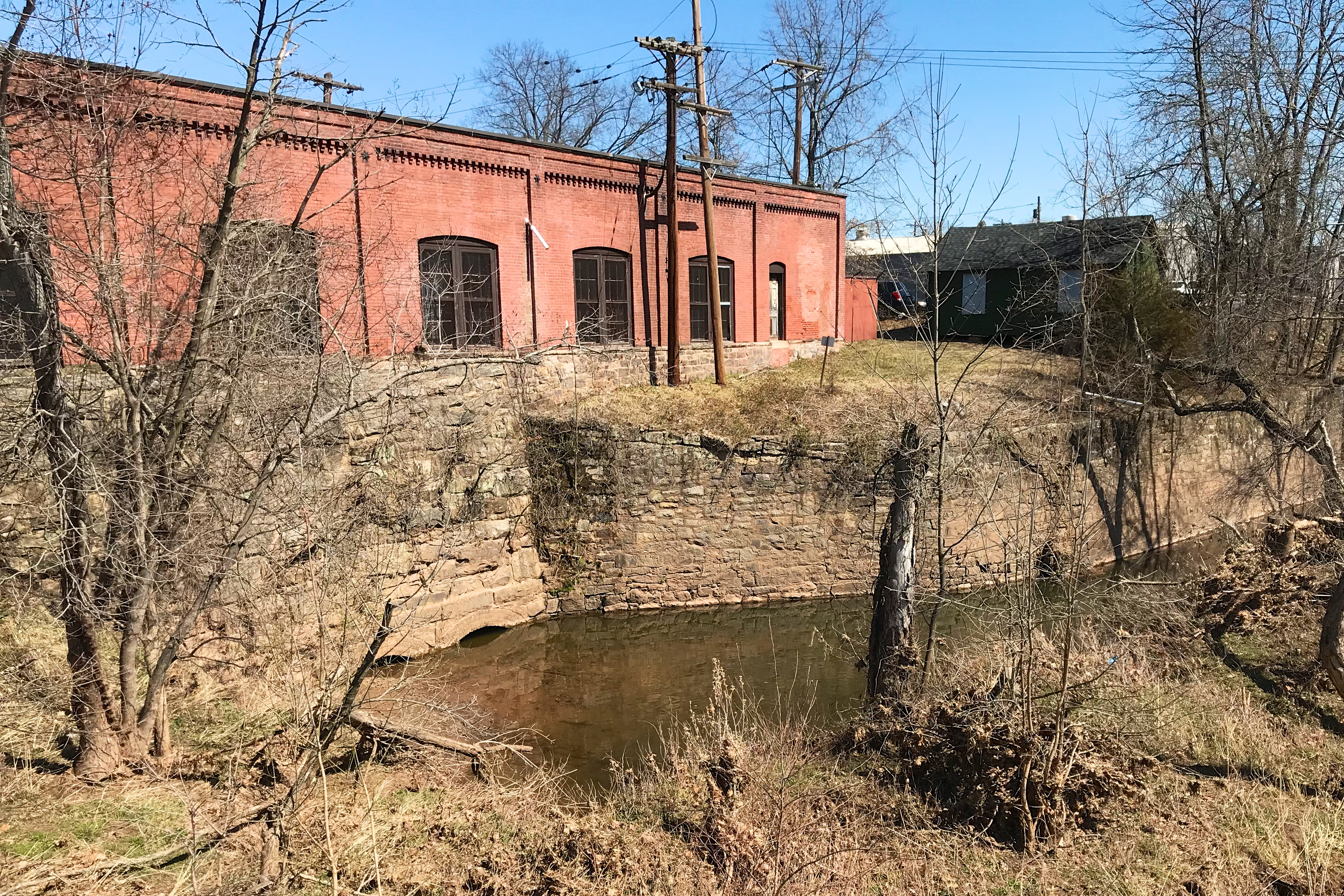
Raritan Water Power Canal, 2018

== See also ==
- National Register of Historic Places listings in Somerset County, New Jersey
- List of bridges on the National Register of Historic Places in New Jersey
- List of crossings of the Raritan River
