= Wells Street Bridge (Fort Wayne, Indiana) =

- U.S. National Register of Historic Places
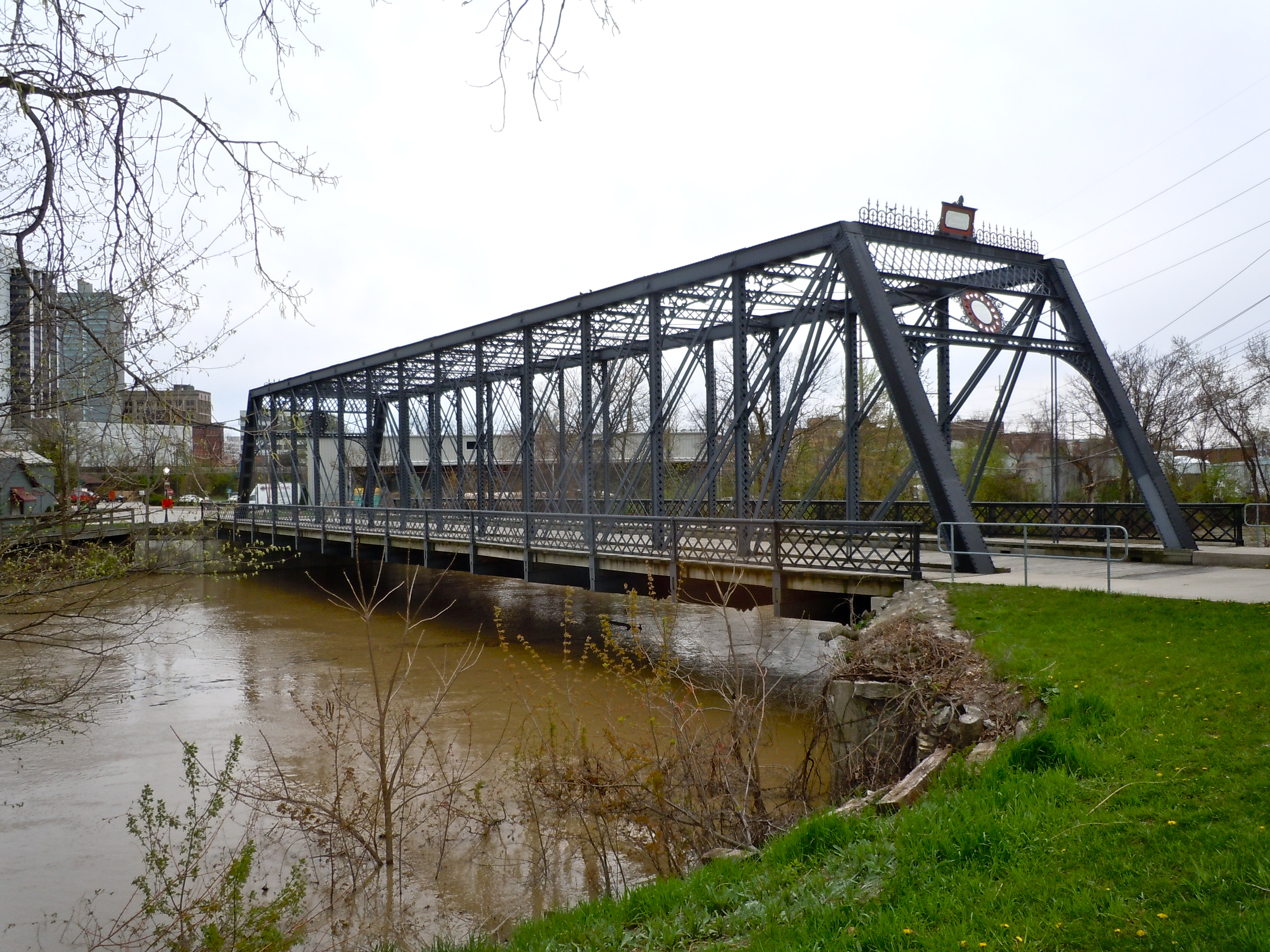
- Wells Street Bridge, April 2011

- Location within Indiana Location within the United States
- Location: Wells St. at the St. Mary's River, Fort Wayne, Indiana
- Coordinates: 41°4′58″N 85°8′38″W
- Area: less than one acre
- Built: 1884
- Built by: Stewart, Alvin John; Wrought Iron Bridge Co.
- Architectural style: Whipple Truss
- NRHP reference No.: 88001575
- Added to NRHP: September 15, 1988

Wells Street Bridge is a historic Whipple truss bridge spanning the St. Marys River at Fort Wayne, Indiana. It was built by the Wrought Iron Bridge Company of Akron, Ohio and erected by Alvin John Stewart in 1884. It has a 180 foot long span and is 23 feet wide. It was closed to vehicular traffic in 1982 and used as a pedestrian walkway.

It was added to the National Register of Historic Places in 1988.
