= Lockatong Creek =

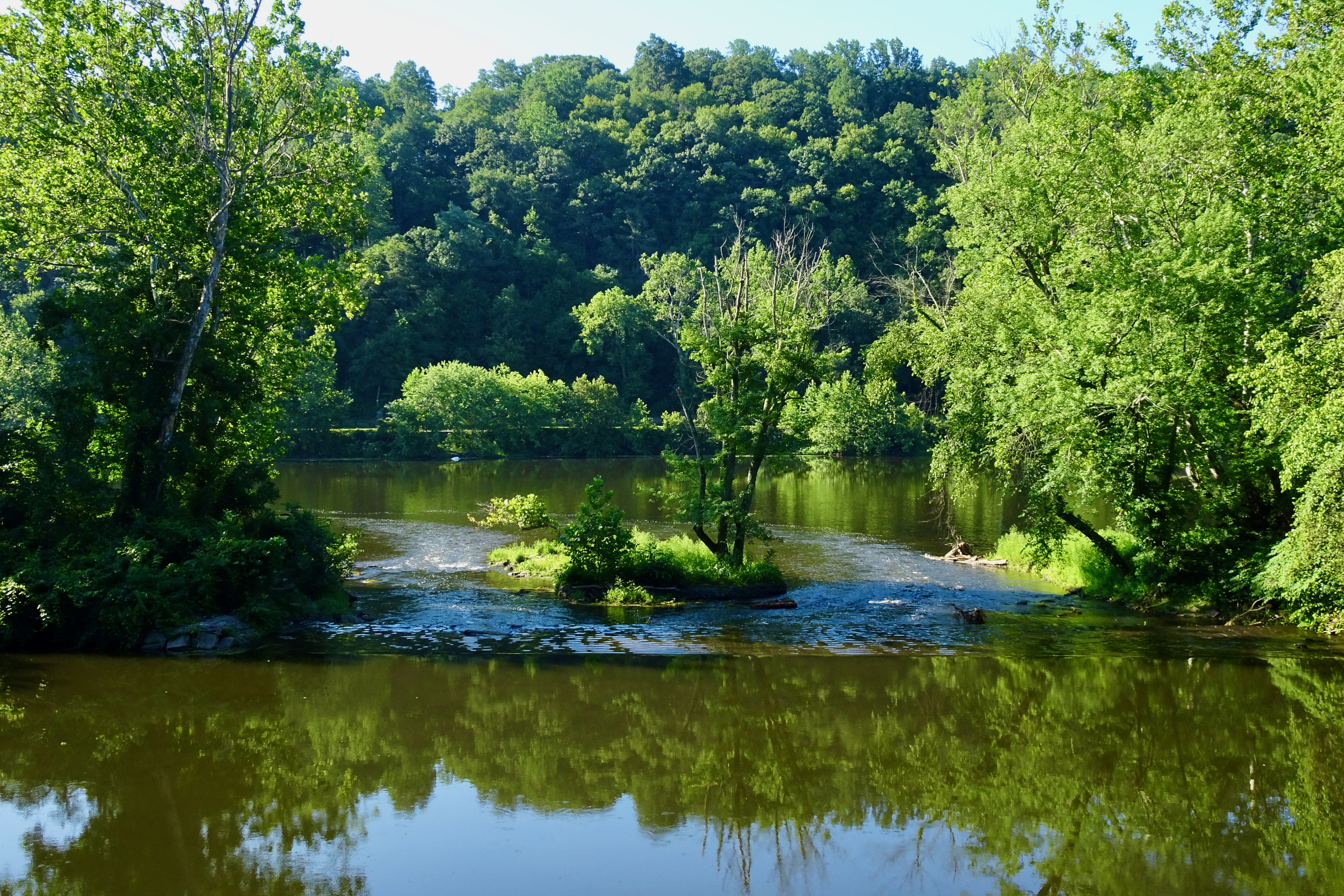
- Confluence of the Lockatong Creek with the Delaware River

Location
- Country: United States
- State: New Jersey
- Region: Hunterdon County

Physical characteristics
- Source
  - location: Franklin Township
  - coordinates: 40°33′15.1″N 74°56′49.1″W
- Mouth: Delaware River
  - location: Delaware Township
  - coordinates: 40°24′27.4″N 75°0′50.6″W

Basin features
- River system: Delaware River

Lockatong Creek is a 15.6-mile-long (25.1 km) tributary of the Delaware River in Hunterdon County, New Jersey, United States. Its source is near Quakertown in Franklin Township. It flows into the Delaware River via an overflow spillway after entering the feeder canal of the Delaware and Raritan Canal in Delaware Township, midway between Raven Rock and Stockton.

Lockatong is derived of a Munsee phrase — lokatink, or “place of wheat meal".

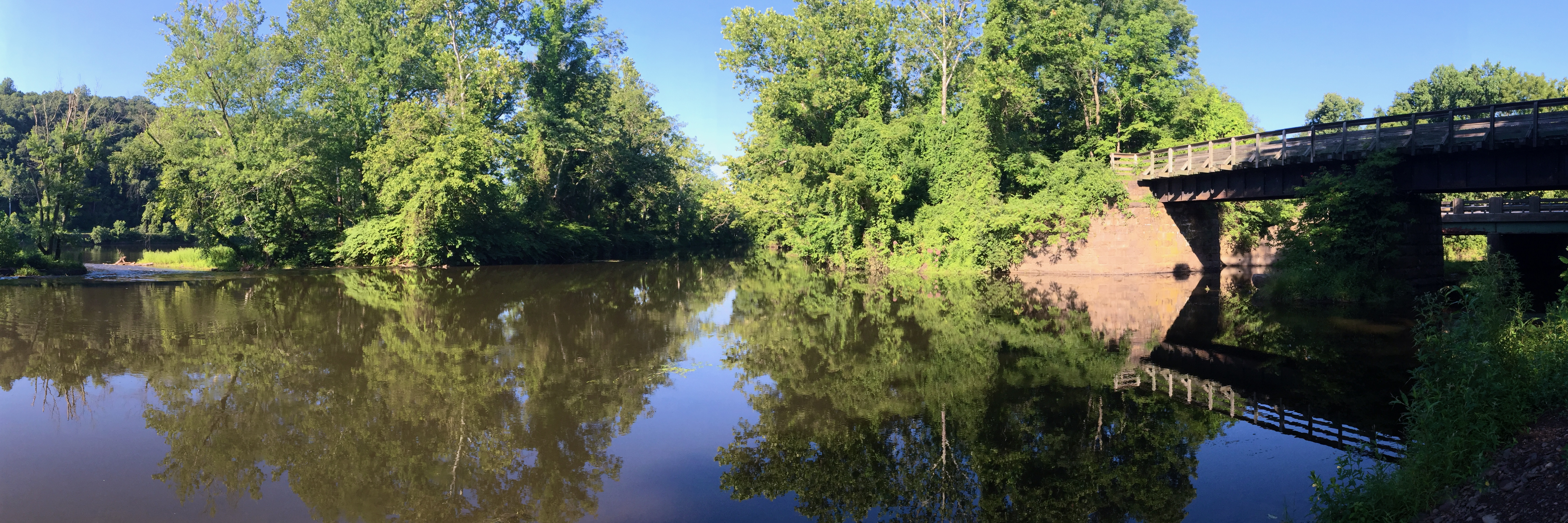
Lockatong Creek flowing, from right to left, into the Delaware River

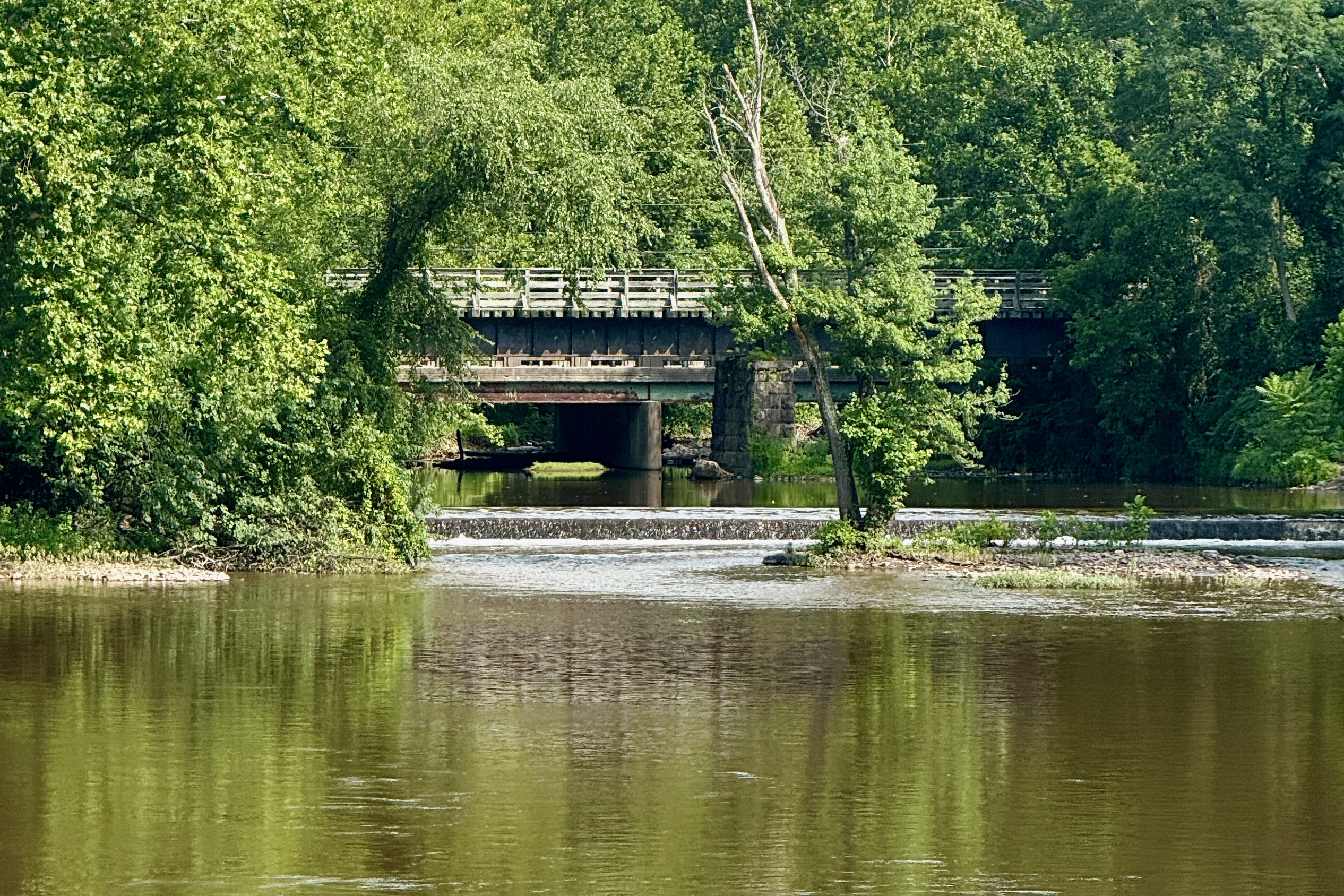
View of the overflow spillway and confluence from the Delaware Canal

== See also ==
- List of rivers of New Jersey
- Strimple's Mill Road Bridge over Lockatong Creek
