= Barton Hills, Michigan =

- Village
- Barton Hills Village
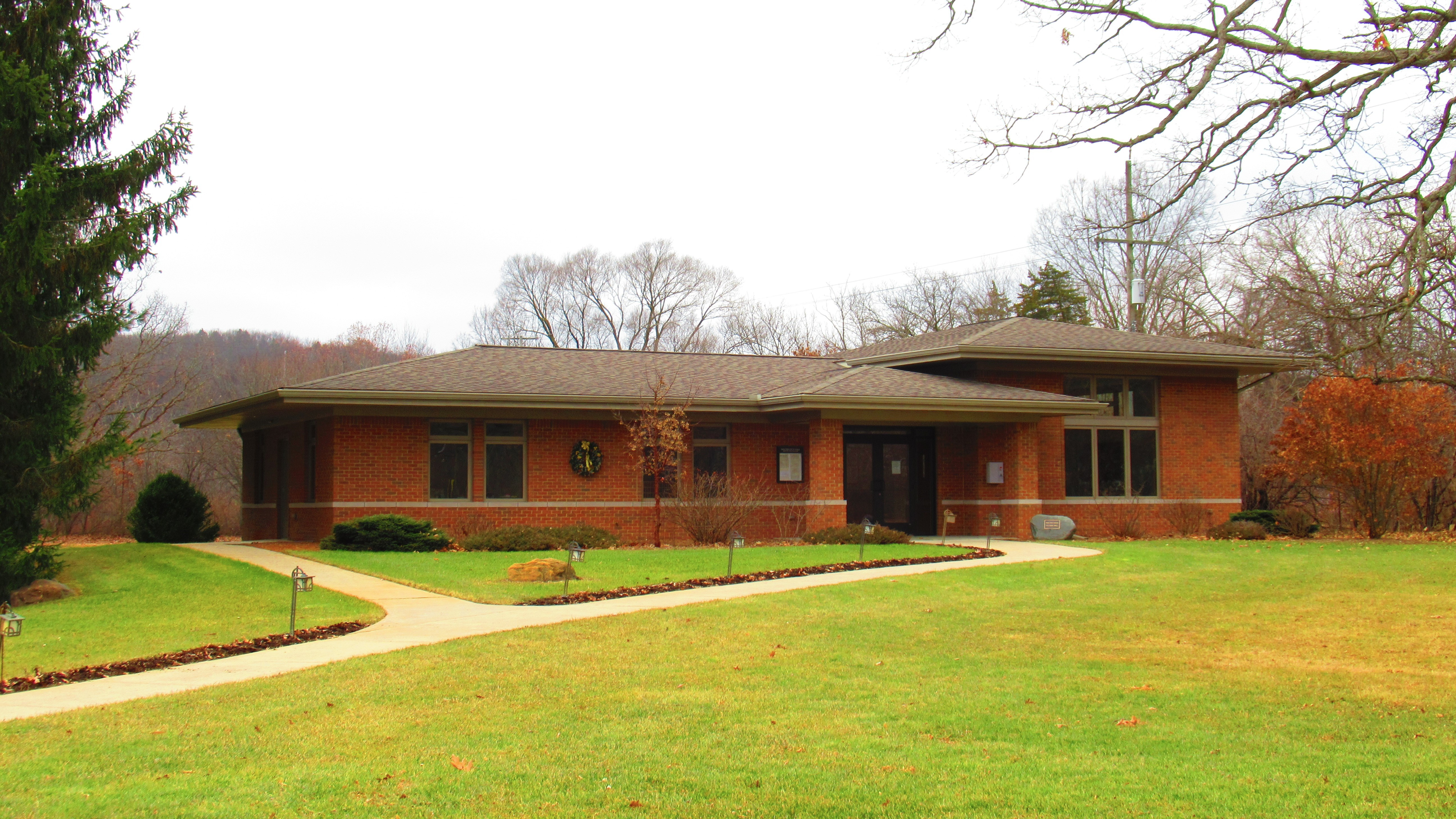
- Walter Esch Village Hall on Barton Shore Drive

- Logo

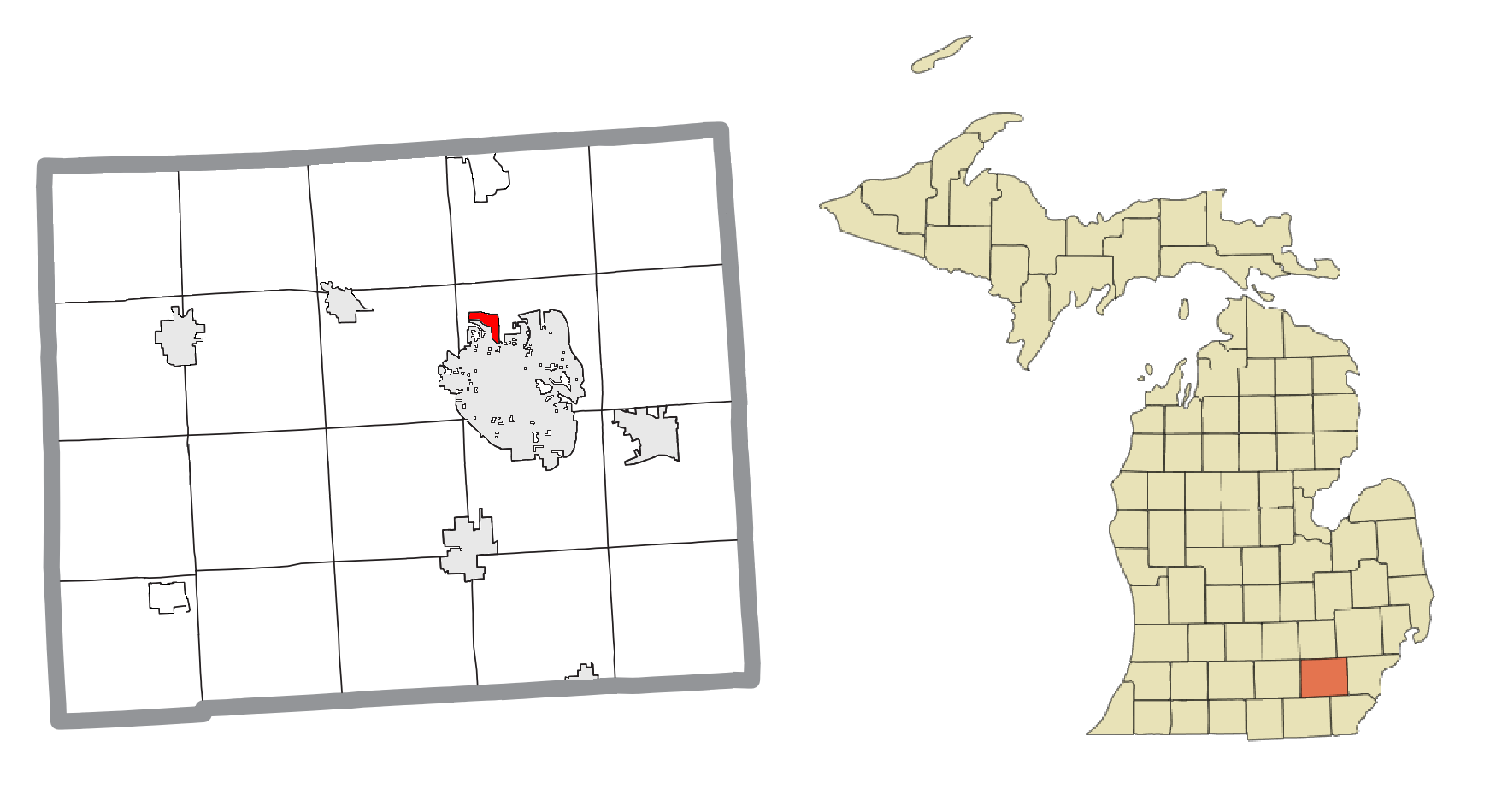
- Location within Washtenaw County

- Location within the state of Michigan Location within the United States
- Coordinates: 42°19′00″N 83°45′21″W
- Country: United States
- State: Michigan
- County: Washtenaw
- Township: Ann Arbor
- Established: 1913
- Incorporated: 1973

Government
  - Type: Board of Trustees
  - President: Howard Holmes II
  - Clerk: Robert Hensinger

Area
  - Total: 0.76 sq mi (1.97 km^{2})
  - Land: 0.76 sq mi (1.97 km^{2})
  - Water: 0 sq mi (0.00 km^{2})
- Elevation: 942 ft (287 m)

Population (2020)
  - Total: 316
  - Density: 415.79/sq mi (160.54/km^{2})
- Time zone: UTC-5 (Eastern (EST))
  - Summer (DST): UTC-4 (EDT)
- ZIP code(s): 48105 (Ann Arbor)
- Area code: 734
- FIPS code: 26-05660
- GNIS feature ID: 2398044
- Website: Official website

Barton Hills is a village in Washtenaw County in the U.S. state of Michigan. The population was 316 at the 2020 census. The village is located within Ann Arbor Charter Township just northwest of the city of Ann Arbor.

Originally established by Detroit Edison president Alex Dow on land acquired for the Barton Dam, Barton Hills was designed as an exclusive, forested residential enclave just outside Ann Arbor. In 1944, the community was sold to its residents, and a village was incorporated in 1973. The streets in the village were formerly owned by the Barton Hills Maintenance Corporation but were purchased by the village itself in 2010.

== History ==
In the early 1900s the land now occupied by Barton Hills Village was used for cattle grazing by a local firm, Towar Dairy. Around 1910, the Detroit Edison Company needed to increase its electrical generating capacity and decided to construct a series of dams and power stations along the Huron River. For that purpose they purchased 2,000 acres and water rights along both sides of the Huron River, including the Towar Dairy property. The present Barton Dam was built in 1913. An area known as "Huron Farms" was established by the Detroit Edison Company in 1913 on this property on the north shore of the Huron River, adjacent to the City of Ann Arbor. Land owned by the company was also used for agricultural purposes, including farms, dairy cattle, and fruit orchards.

Detroit Edison's president, Alex Dow, devoted part of the company's acquisition as an exclusive residential community for company executives. Dow and his wife Vivienne selected a site just north of the Barton Dam, on former pastureland, for their own house. In 1915, the company contracted with the Olmsted Brothers, famous for their park and subdivision designs, as landscape architects for the new community. The Olmsted Brothers architectural firm, designers of Central Park in New York City, were employed to lay out lot lines and roads which they did in great detail. Most of that plan is still in use today. At first a denuded hill sloping into the pond, jokingly referred to as "Barren Hill", the Olmstead Brothers plan prescribed that the area be reforested. Several Detroit Edison executives had constructed homes along the river in this area by the early 1920s. In 1924 the company platted and deeded the Towar parcel as a subdivision called Barton Hills, and in the process placed deed restrictions on the property to ensure that it would remain a controlled residential community. When homes were constructed in the 1920s, restrictions attached to each deed stipulated that the homes must be designed by a registered architect.

The Barton Hills Country Club, the only business establishment within the village, was founded in 1917. Membership in the Barton Hills Country Club was considered by many to be a mark of distinction. In 2020, about 45% of Barton Hills residents were members of the country club.

The subdivision was in its early years considered too far from Ann Arbor to be attractive, and grew slowly. The economic depression of the 1930s slowed all types of building, and it was only in the post-World War II years of the 1950s and 1960s that construction of private homes resumed in earnest. This has continued so that few empty lots remain.

By the 1940s, through the economic and social turmoil of the Great Depression and World War II, the community had become an economic liability for a public utility. The company shareholders decided to make an outright gift of its holding to the residents of the community in exchange for assuming responsibility for maintaining the water system, roads, and other municipal services. However, the community did not seek municipal status until some thirty years later. On December 12, 1973, the community became the first home rule village in Washtenaw County.

== Geography ==
According to the U.S. Census Bureau, the village has a total area of 0.76 square miles (1.97 km^{2}), all land.

Barton Hills sits on the north bank of Barton Pond along the Huron River, which is a reservoir created by Barton Dam, which is located in the city of Ann Arbor.

== Demographics ==
Historical population
Census	Pop.	Note	%±
1980	357		—
1990	320		−10.4%
2000	335		4.7%
2010	294		−12.2%
2020	316		7.5%
U.S. Decennial Census

=== 2010 census ===
As of the census of 2010, there were 294 people, 123 households, and 93 families residing in the village. The population density was 392.0 inhabitants per square mile (151.4/km^{2}). There were 137 housing units at an average density of 182.7 per square mile (70.5/km^{2}). The racial makeup of the village was 88.1% White, 1.0% African American, 6.8% Asian, 1.7% from other races, and 2.4% from two or more races. Hispanic or Latino of any race were 5.8% of the population.

There were 123 households, of which 25.2% had children under the age of 18 living with them, 69.9% were married couples living together, 2.4% had a female householder with no husband present, 3.3% had a male householder with no wife present, and 24.4% were non-families. 21.1% of all households were made up of individuals, and 14.6% had someone living alone who was 65 years of age or older. The average household size was 2.39 and the average family size was 2.74.

The median age in the village was 53.7 years. 21.8% of residents were under the age of 18; 1% were between the ages of 18 and 24; 10.2% were from 25 to 44; 37.3% were from 45 to 64; and 29.6% were 65 years of age or older. The gender makeup of the village was 48.0% male and 52.0% female.

=== 2000 census ===
As of the census of 2000, there were 335 people, 136 households, and 112 families residing in the village. The population density was 418.2 inhabitants per square mile (161.5/km^{2}). There were 141 housing units at an average density of 176.0 per square mile (68.0/km^{2}). The racial makeup of the village was 88.96% White, 1.49% African American, 5.07% Asian, 0.30% Pacific Islander, 0.30% from other races, and 3.88% from two or more races. Hispanic or Latino of any race were 1.19% of the population.

There were 136 households, out of which 25.0% had children under the age of 18 living with them. 81.6% of households were married couples living together, 0.7% had a female householder with no husband present, and 17.6% were non-families. 15.4% of all households were made up of individuals, and 9.6% had someone living alone who was 65 years of age or older. The average household size was 2.46 and the average family size was 2.73.

The village population was 18.8% under the age of 18, 3.6% age 18 to 24, 14.6% age 25 to 44, 40.6% age 45 to 64, and 22.4% age 65 and older. The median age was 52. For every 100 females, there were 92.5 males. For every 100 females age 18 and over, there were 95.7 males.

The median household income was $149,056, and the median family income was $153,166. Males had a median income of $100,000 versus $51,111 for females. The per capita income for the village was $110,683. None of the families and 0.6% of the population were living below the poverty line, none of whom were under the age of eighteen or over 64.

== Education ==
Barton Hills is served by Ann Arbor Public Schools, although there are no schools located within the village.

== Images ==
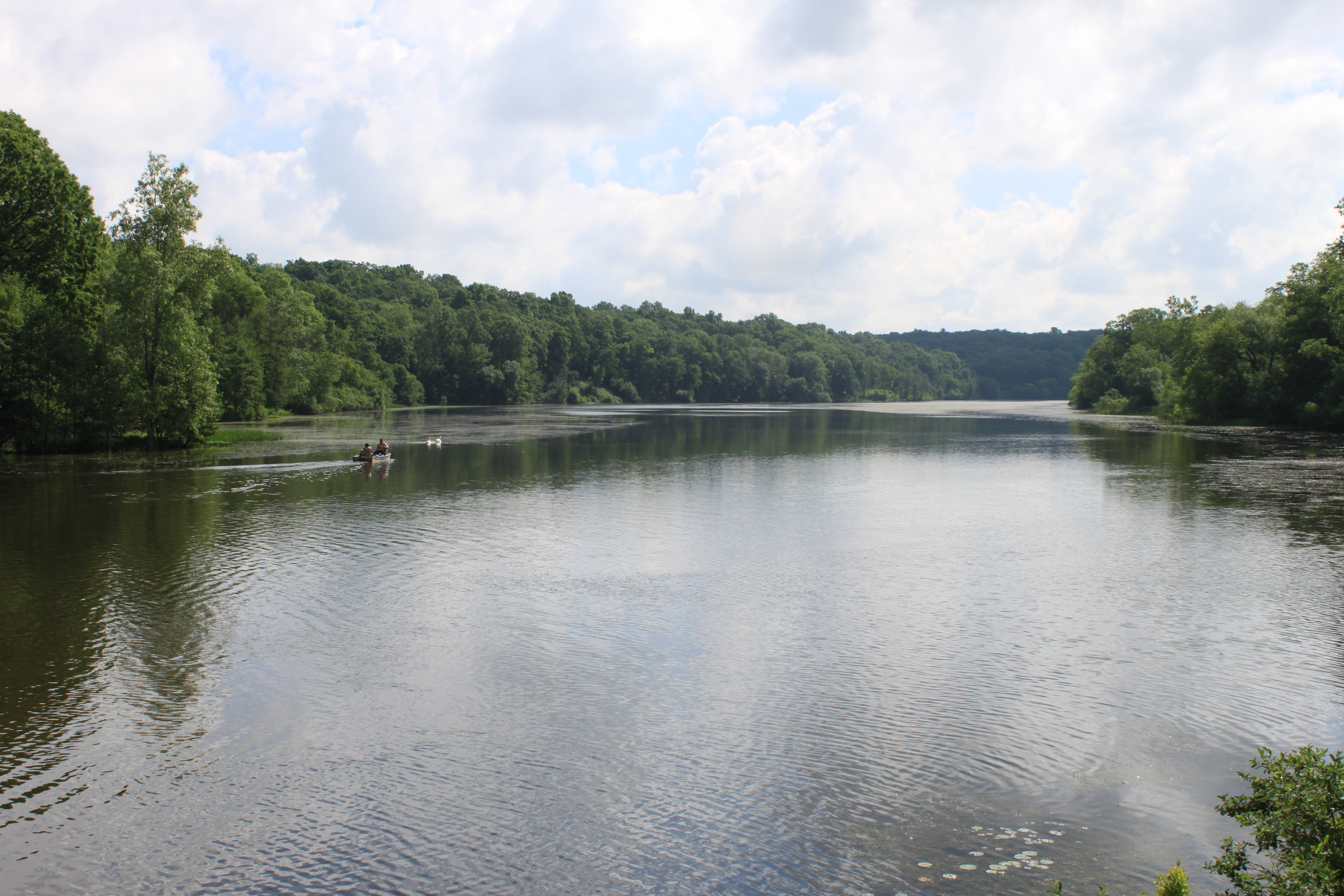
Barton Pond created from the Barton Dam

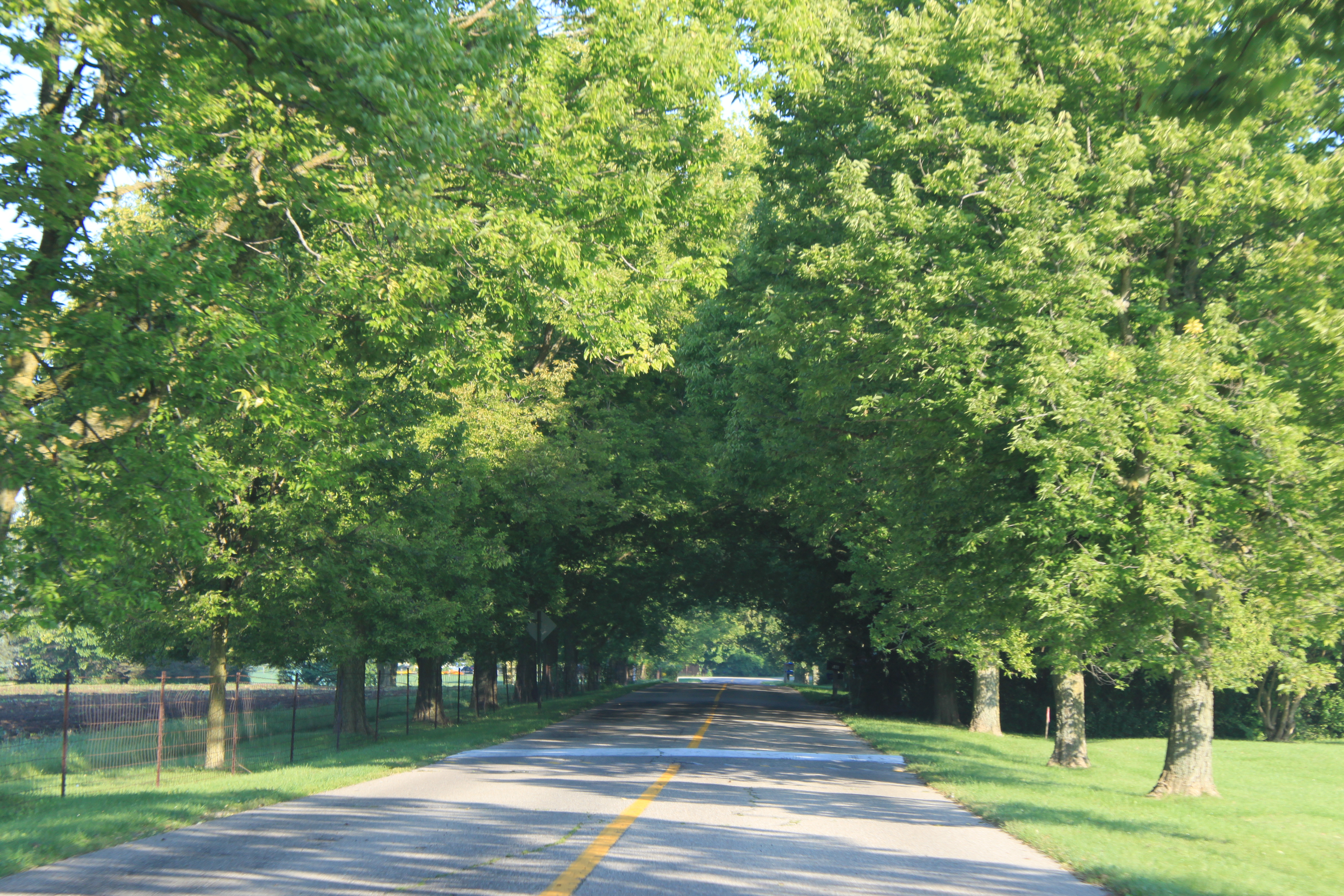
Barton Shore Drive

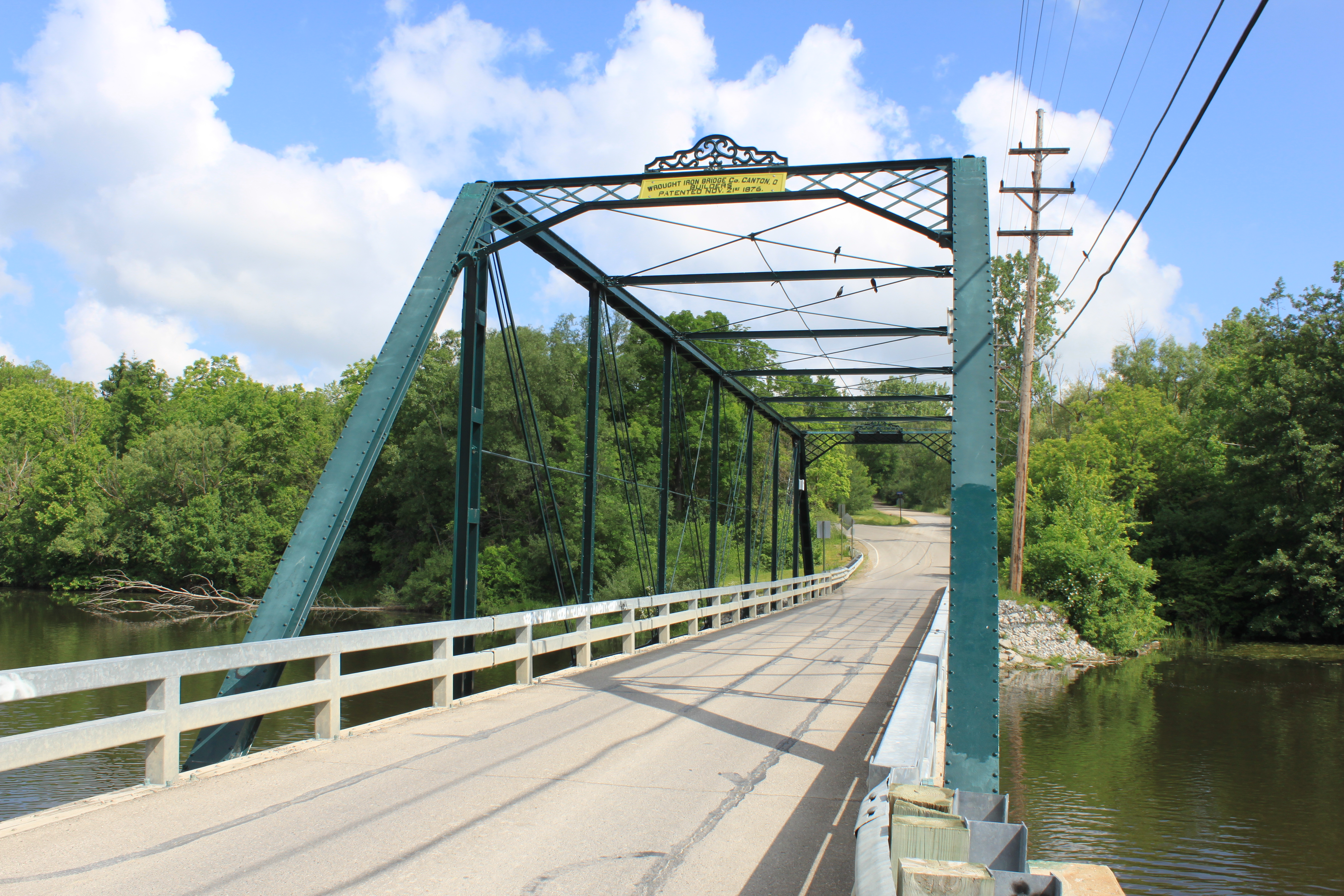
Maple–Foster Bridge
