= List of bridges on the National Register of Historic Places in New Jersey =

This is a list of bridges and tunnels on the National Register of Historic Places in the U.S. state of New Jersey.

== Current listings ==
Name	Image	Built	Listed	Location	County	Type
Arch Bridge from the Boonton Ironworks		1866	2022-09-01	Boonton; 40°54′23″N 74°24′58″W	Morris	Stone arch
Backwards Tunnel		1871, 1872	2005-12-28	Ogdensburg; 41°5′9″N 74°36′7″W	Sussex	Double stone arch
Bedens Brook Bridge		1822	1994-02-17	Rocky Hill; 40°24′56″N 74°39′51″W	Somerset	Stone arch
Bedens Brook Road Bridge		ca. 1872, 1890	1994-02-18	Stoutsburg; 40°23′40″N 74°43′47″W	Somerset	Stone arch
Bonnie's Bridge		ca. 1790	1984-09-13	Cherry Hill; 39°54′39″N 75°0′18″W	Camden	Stone arch
Bowne Station Road stone arch bridge over tributary of the Alexauken Creek		1837	2024-04-11	Bowne; 40°25′11.2″N 74°54′47.9″W	Hunterdon	Stone arch
Brielle Road Bridge over the Glimmer Glass		1938, 1950	April 25, 2008	Manasquan; 40°6′42.79″N 74°2′44.77″W	Monmouth	Bascule
Buchanan Road stone arch bridge over a tributary of Alexauken Creek		1857	2025-03-17	Delaware Township; 40°25′24.1″N 74°56′04.3″W	Hunterdon	Stone arch
Canal Road over Six Mile Run part of the Delaware and Raritan Canal		1834	1973-05-11	Blackwells Mills; 40°28′23″N 74°34′16″W	Somerset	Triple stone arch
Cat Tail Brook Bridge		1825	1979-08-01	Rocky Hill; 40°26′28″N 74°44′37″W	Somerset	
CR 616 over South Branch of Rancocas Creek part of the Vincentown Historic District		1918	1988-09-21	Southampton Township	Burlington	Steel stringer
CR 681 over Stop the Jade Run part of the Vincentown Historic District		1915	1988-09-21	Southampton Township	Burlington	Stringer
Cold Water Bridge		1849	2025-03-17	Delaware Township; 40°26′41.3″N 74°57′53.8″W	Hunterdon	Stone arch
Dock Bridge		1935	1980-10-03	Newark; 40°44′9″N 74°9′43″W	Essex	Through-truss lift
Draw Bridge at New Bridge part of Historic New Bridge Landing		1888, 1889	1989-07-05	New Milford, River Edge, Teaneck; 40°54′51″N 74°1′48″W	Bergen	Pratt truss, listed in NJ and National Registers as oldest highway swing-bridge in NJ
Elm Street over Hackensack River part of the New Milford Plant of the Hackensack Water Company		1892	2001-08-22	Oradell 40°56′56.2″N 74°1′32.9″W	Bergen	Phoenix column Pratt pony truss
Fairmount–Pottersville Road stone arch bridge over Hollow Brook		ca. 1875–1899	2026-05-21	Tewksbury Township; 40°43′28.7″N 74°45′16.0″W	Hunterdon	Stone arch
Farnsworth Avenue over Robbinsville Secondary part of the Bordentown Historic District		ca. 1831	1982-06-14	Bordentown	Burlington	Stone arch
Federal Twist Road stone-arch bridge over Shirt Run Creek		ca. 1850–1875	2025-03-17	Delaware Township; 40°25′47.8″N 75°01′28.3″W	Hunterdon	Stone arch
Fink-Type Truss Bridge	Fink-Type Truss Bridge	1857	1974-12-24	Allerton; 40°36′14″N 74°54′10″W	Hunterdon	Fink truss, HAER NJ-18
Foundry Road over North Branch of Rancocas Creek part of the Smithville Historic District		ca. 1885	1977-05-12	Eastampton Township	Burlington	Stringer
Frog Hollow Road Bridge over minor tributary of the South Branch Raritan River		by 1873	2002-12-12	Tewksbury Township; 40°43′48.4″N 74°49′6″W	Hunterdon	Stone arch
Glen Gardner Pony Pratt Truss Bridge		1870	1977-09-22	Glen Gardner; 40°42′5″N 74°56′36″W	Hunterdon	Pratt truss, HAER NJ-92
Green Sergeants Covered Bridge		1872, 1961	1974-11-19	Stockton; 40°26′39″N 74°57′59″W	Hunterdon	Covered
Griggstown Causeway over Millstone River part of the Griggstown Historic District		1903, 1938, 1978	1984-08-02	Griggstown; 40°26′21″N 74°37′05″W	Somerset	Truss
Hardenburgh Avenue Bridge		1909, 1911	2001-03-12	Demarest Borough; 40°57′24″N 73°57′48″W	Bergen	Brick deck arch
Higginsville Road Bridges		1889, 1890, 1893	2000-08-10	Hillsborough; 40°30′33″N 74°47′8″W	Somerset	Truss
Holland Tunnel		1920, 1927	1993-11-04	Jersey City	Hudson	Cast iron tunnel
Hollow Brook Road Bridge over tributary of the Lamington River		c. 1880	2002-12-12	Tewksbury Township; 40°43′2.3″N 74°44′10.5″W	Hunterdon	Truss
Kingston Bridge part of the Delaware and Raritan Canal, Kingston Mill Historic District, and King's Highway Historic District		1798	1973-05-11	Kingston	Mercer, Middlesex, Somerset	Stone arch
Locktown–Sergeantsville Road truss bridge over Plum Brook		1922	2025-03-24	Delaware Township; 40°28′7.1″N 74°57′27.1″W	Hunterdon	Warren truss
Lower Creek Road truss bridge over the Wickecheoke Creek		c. 1915	2025-05-23	Delaware Township; 40°25′18.7″N 74°58′47.1″W	Hunterdon	Warren truss
Madison Avenue over Hackensack River part of the New Milford Plant of the Hackensack Water Company		1902	2001-08-22	New Milford	Bergen	Multi-girder
Main Street Bridge (Califon, New Jersey) part of the Califon Historic District		1887	1976-10-14	Califon; 40°43′14″N 74°50′15.5″W	Hunterdon	Pratt truss, HAER NJ-56
Main Street Bridge (Clinton, New Jersey) part of the Clinton Historic District		1870	1995-09-28	Clinton; 40°38′9.5″N 74°54′43.5″W	Hunterdon	Pratt truss, HAER NJ-19
Main Street Bridge (CR 629) over Washington Secondary of DL&W RR part of the Port Murray Historic District		1914	1996-06-07	Port Murray; 40°47′08″N 74°54′58″W	Warren	Thru Girder
Mill Pond Bridge part of the Bridgepoint Historic District		c. 1820s	1975-06-10	Montgomery Township; 40°26′04″N 74°38′42″W	Somerset	Stone arch
Mount Joy Road Bridge part of the Finesville–Seigletown Historic District		c. 1890	2010-11-10	Finesville; 40°36′21″N 75°10′14.5″W	Hunterdon, Warren	Pratt truss
Neshanic Station Lenticular Truss Bridge part of the Neshanic Station Historic District		1896	2016-02-08	Neshanic Station; 40°30′34″N 74°43′37″W	Somerset	Lenticular truss bridge, HAER NJ-31
New Hampton Pony Pratt Truss Bridge		1868	1977-07-26	New Hampton; 40°43′14″N 74°57′49″W	Hunterdon, Warren	Pratt truss, HAER NJ-91
Old Mill Road truss bridge over the Wickecheoke Creek		1899	2025-05-23	Delaware Township; 40°27′53″N 74°58′35″W	Hunterdon	Pratt truss
Old Turnpike Road over Musconetcong River part of the Miller Farmstead historic district		1860	1989-09-11	Penwell; 40°47′09″N 74°53′42″W	Hunterdon, Warren	Triple Stone arch
Old Stone Arch Bridge		1730	2008-06-27	Bound Brook; 40°33′38″N 74°31′37″W	Somerset	Stone arch
Palatine Road Bridge over a minor tributary of the Lamington River		1900	2002-12-12	Tewksbury Township; 40°41′58.8″N 74°44′47.6″W	Hunterdon	Stone arch
Peck's Ferry Bridge		1900	1999-11-12	Delaware Township; 40°29′3″N 74°56′36.5″W	Hunterdon	Warren truss
Pennsylvania Railroad Bridge	Pennsylvania Railroad Bridge	1903	1979-06-06	Trenton; 40°12′31″N 74°45′58″W	Mercer	Stone arch
Plane Hill Road Bridge over Pohatcong Creek part of the Bowerstown Historic District		c. 1830	1996-05-10	Bowerstown; 40°46′14″N 74°59′51″W	Warren	Stone arch
Pulaski Skyway part of the Route 1 Extension		1932	2005-08-12		Essex, Hudson	
Race Street over South Branch of Rancocas Creek part of the Vincentown Historic District		1909	1988-09-21	Southampton Township	Burlington	Steel stringer
Randolphville Bridge		1937, 1939	1999-09-17	Piscataway; 40°32′22″N 74°27′11″W	Middlesex	
Raritan Bridge	Raritan Bridge	1886	1992-11-12	Raritan; 40°33′53″N 74°38′9″W	Somerset	Pratt through truss
Raven Rock Road Bridge		1878	2016-10-04	Raven Rock; 40°24′58.5″N 75°01′03.2″W	Hunterdon	Pratt truss
Rock Brook Bridge		1825	1994-02-18	Zion; 40°26′22″N 74°44′23″W	Somerset	Stone arch
Rockafellows Mill Bridge part of the Raritan–Readington South Branch Historic District		1900	1990-01-26	Rockefellows Mills; 40°31′14″N 74°49′13″W	Hunterdon	Pratt truss
Sandbrook–Headquarters Road stone arch bridge over a tributary of the Third Neshanic River		1873	2025-03-17	Delaware Township; 40°26′55.1″N 74°54′49.6″W	Hunterdon	Stone arch
Smithville Road over North Branch Rancocas Creek part of the Smithville Historic District		1914	1977-05-12	Eastampton Township	Burlington	Continuous concrete slab
Smithville-Port Republic Road over Nacote Creek part of the Port Republic Historic District		1904	1991-05-16	Port Republic	Atlantic	Steel Warren pony truss swing
Stone Sign Post Road Bridge over Plum Brook		1903	2016-10-04	Delaware Township; 40°29′25.8″N 74°56′19.3″W	Hunterdon	Warren truss
Strimple's Mill Road Bridge over Lockatong Creek		1897	2016-10-04	Delaware Township; 40°26′13.6″N 75°00′42.5″W	Hunterdon	Pratt truss
Trenton City/Calhoun Street Bridge	Calhoun Street Bridge	1885	1975-11-20	Trenton; 40°13′11″N 74°46′42″W	Mercer	Phoenix column truss
Uhlerstown–Frenchtown Bridge part of the Frenchtown Historic District	Uhlerstown–Frenchtown Bridge	1931	1994-05-19	Frenchtown; 40°31′34″N 75°3′54″W	Hunterdon	Warren truss
Upper Black Eddy–Milford Bridge part of the Milford Historic District	Upper Black Eddy–Milford Bridge	1933	2025-04-21	Milford; 40°33′59″N 75°5′55″W	Hunterdon	Warren truss
US 40 & NJ 50 over Great Egg Harbor River part of the Mays Landing Historic District		1928	1990-08-23	Mays Landing	Atlantic	Concrete multi-girder
US 40 & NJ 50 over Pleasantville Section RR part of the Mays Landing Historic District		1929	1990-08-23	Mays Landing	Atlantic	Steel stringer
Warrington Stone Bridge	Warrington Stone Bridge	ca. 1860	1977-12-16	Warrington; 40°56′9″N 75°4′16.5″W	Warren	Stone arch
Weymouth Road Bridge		1920	2001-06-21	Hamilton Township; 39°31′7″N 74°46′45″W	Atlantic	Steel Warren pony truss
White Street over North Branch Rancocas Creek part of the Mount Holly Historic District		1853	1973-02-20	Mount Holly Township	Burlington	Brick elliptical arch
Whitesbog Road over Pole Bridge Branch Canal part of the Whitesbog Historic District		1935	1988-10-27	Pemberton Township	Burlington	Concrete box culvert
Worman Road stone arch bridge over Shoppon's Run		1883	2025-09-29	Delaware Township; 40°25′33.8″N 74°57′48.8″W	Hunterdon	Stone arch
Yard Road stone arch bridge over a tributary of Sand Brook		1872	2025-03-17	Delaware Township; 40°27′29.3″N 74°53′52.4″W	Hunterdon	Stone arch
