= Yard Road stone arch bridge over a tributary of Sand Brook =

- U.S. National Register of Historic Places
- New Jersey Register of Historic Places
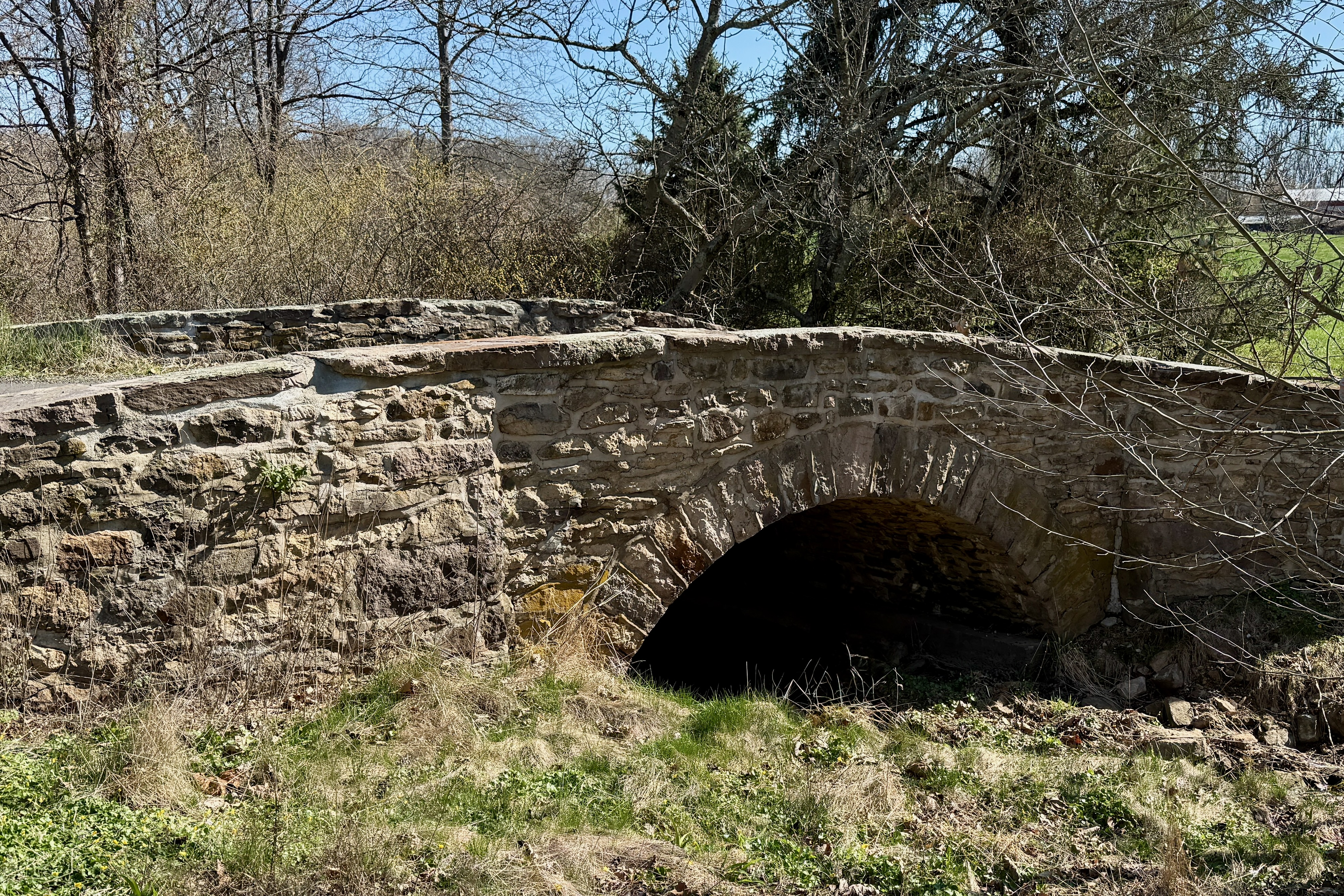

- Location within Hunterdon County, New Jersey Location within New Jersey Location within the United States
- Location: Yard Road at a tributary of Sand Brook, Delaware Township, Hunterdon County, New Jersey
- Coordinates: 40°27′29.3″N 74°53′52.4″W
- Built: 1872
- MPS: Historic Bridges of Delaware Township, Hunterdon County, New Jersey MPDF
- NRHP reference No.: 100011526
- NJRHP No.: 5852

Significant dates
- Added to NRHP: March 17, 2025
- Designated NJRHP: January 27, 2025

The Yard Road stone arch bridge over a tributary of Sand Brook is located in Delaware Township in Hunterdon County, New Jersey, United States. Built in 1872, the stone arch bridge was added to the National Register of Historic Places on March 17, 2025, for its significance in engineering and transportation. It was listed as part of the Historic Bridges of Delaware Township, Hunterdon County, New Jersey Multiple Property Submission (MPS).

== History and description ==
The single-lane, single-barrel, sandstone stone arch bridge was built in 1872 over a tributary of the Third Neshanic River, historically known as the Sand Brook. The barrel is slightly skewed with respect to the wingwalls. Yard Road leads to the German Baptist Church in Sand Brook.

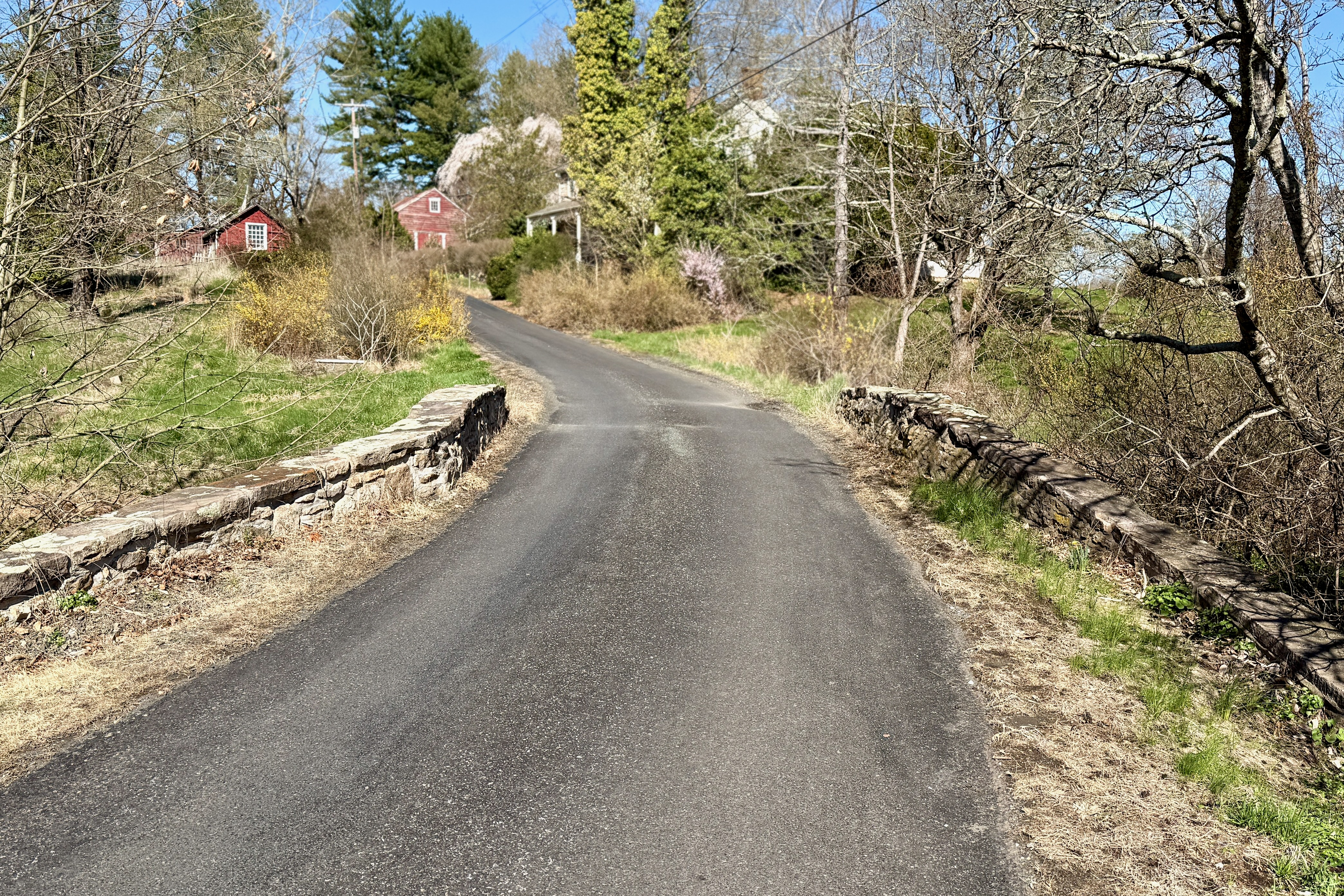
View of bridge looking west

== See also ==
- National Register of Historic Places listings in Hunterdon County, New Jersey
- List of bridges on the National Register of Historic Places in New Jersey
