= Sandbrook–Headquarters Road stone arch bridge over a tributary of the Third Neshanic River =

- U.S. National Register of Historic Places
- New Jersey Register of Historic Places
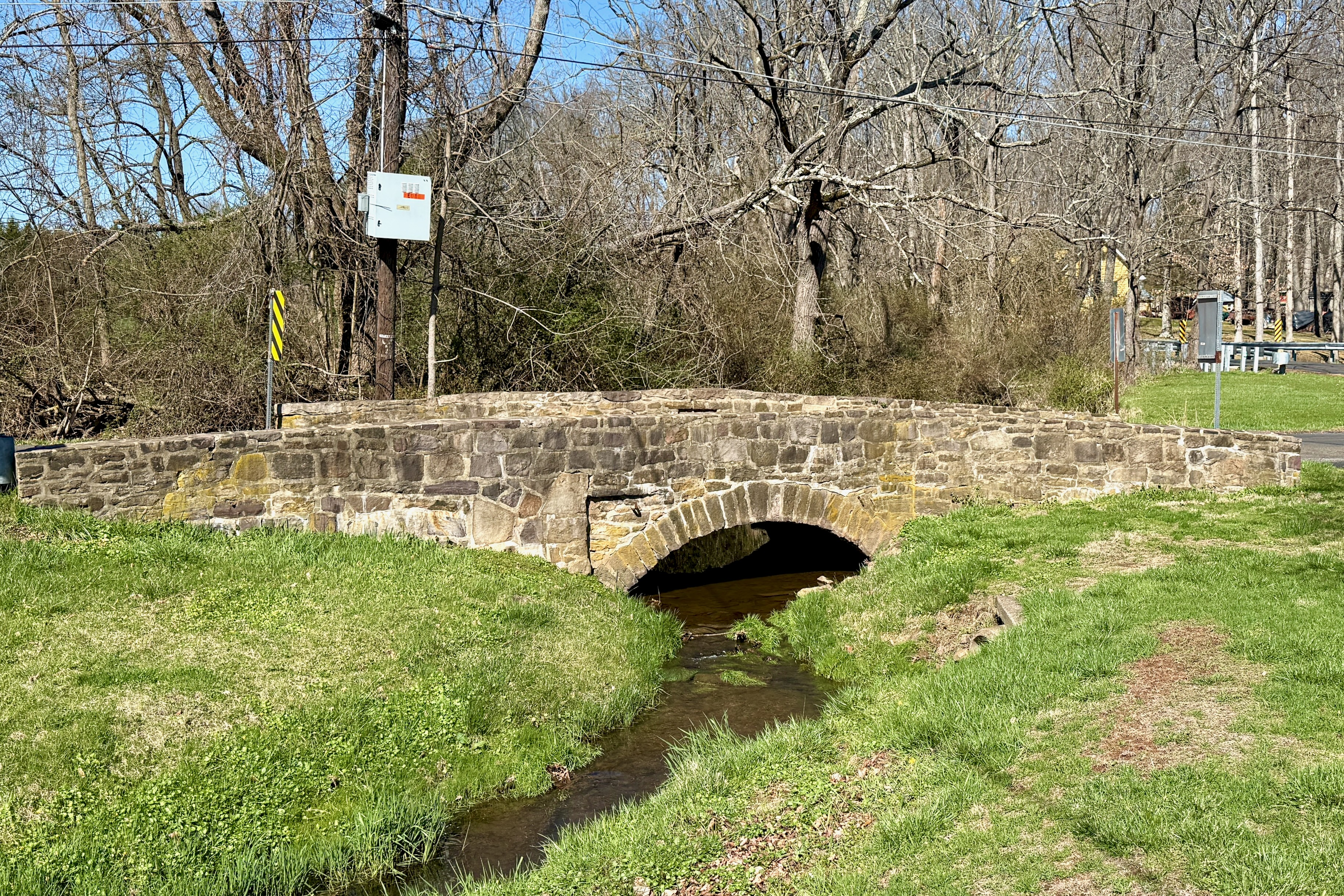

- Location within Hunterdon County, New Jersey Location within New Jersey Location within the United States
- Location: Sandbrook–Headquarters Road at a tributary of the Third Neshanic River, Delaware Township, Hunterdon County, New Jersey
- Coordinates: 40°26′55.1″N 74°54′49.6″W
- Built: 1873
- MPS: Historic Bridges of Delaware Township, Hunterdon County, New Jersey MPDF
- NRHP reference No.: 100011523
- NJRHP No.: 6043

Significant dates
- Added to NRHP: March 17, 2025
- Designated NJRHP: January 27, 2025

The Sandbrook–Headquarters Road stone arch bridge over a tributary of the Third Neshanic River is located near the Amwell Church of the Brethren in Delaware Township, Hunterdon County, New Jersey, United States. Built in 1873, the stone arch bridge was added to the National Register of Historic Places on March 17, 2025, for its significance in engineering and transportation. The datestone has the names of Joseph Smith, J. Goodfellow and N. D. Morris above the date. The bridge was listed as part of the Historic Bridges of Delaware Township, Hunterdon County, New Jersey Multiple Property Submission (MPS).

== History and description ==
The single-lane, single-barrel, sandstone stone arch bridge was built in 1873 over a tributary of the Third Neshanic River. The barrel is slightly skewed with respect to the wingwalls. According to the nomination form, the bridge represents the peak of stone arch construction in the county.

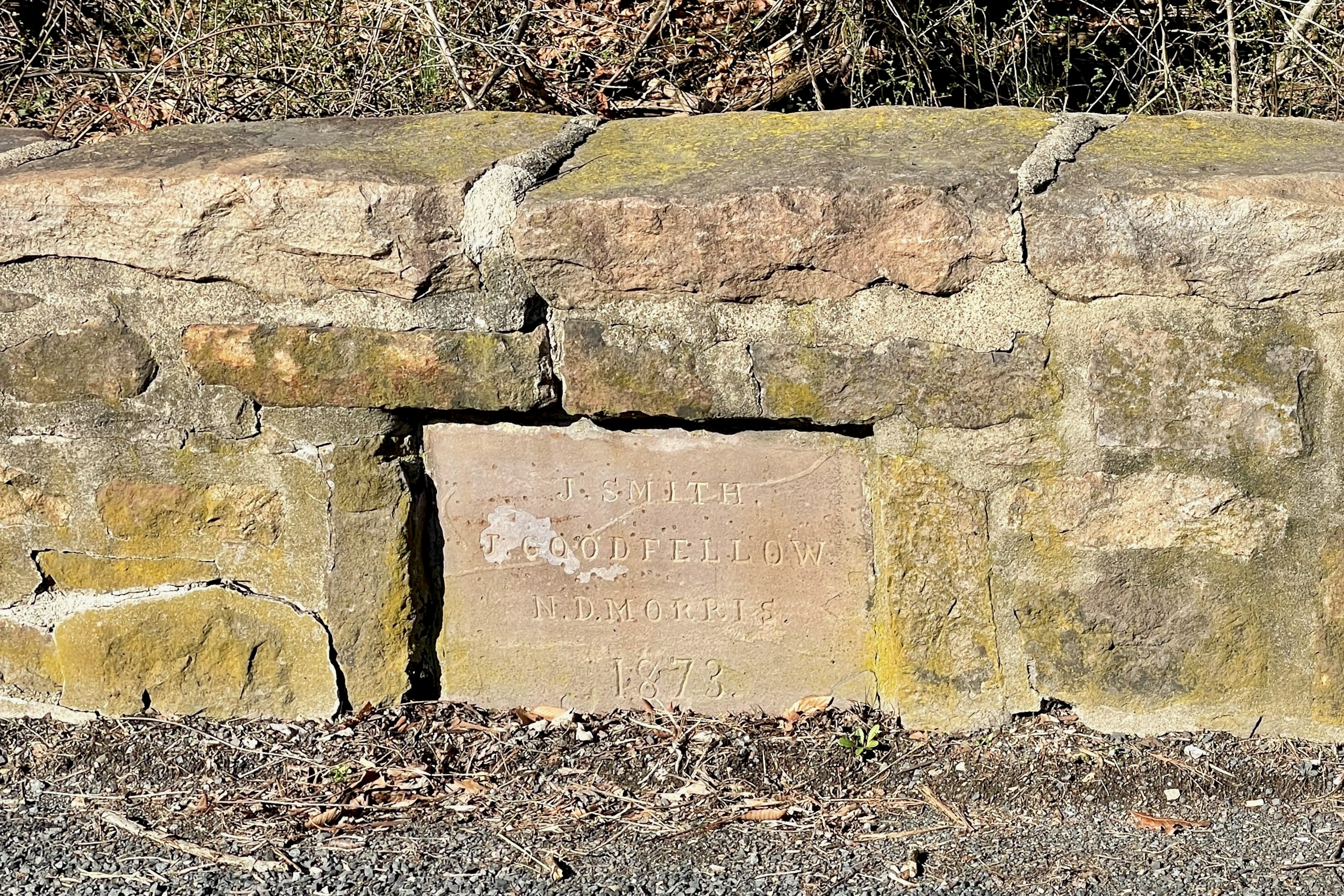
Bridge datestone

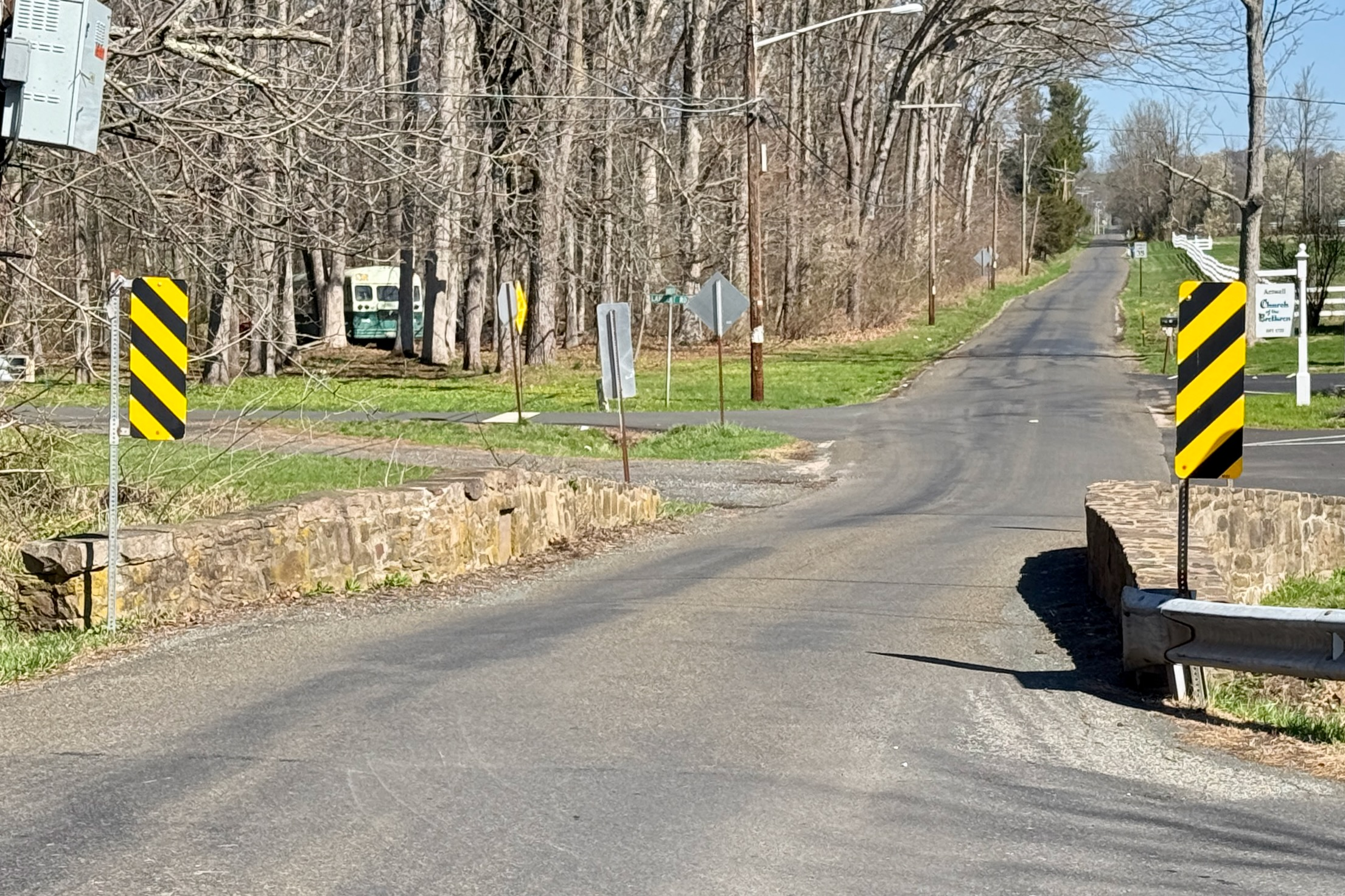
View of bridge looking north

== See also ==
- National Register of Historic Places listings in Hunterdon County, New Jersey
- List of bridges on the National Register of Historic Places in New Jersey
