= Worman Road stone arch bridge over Shoppon's Run =

- U.S. National Register of Historic Places
- New Jersey Register of Historic Places
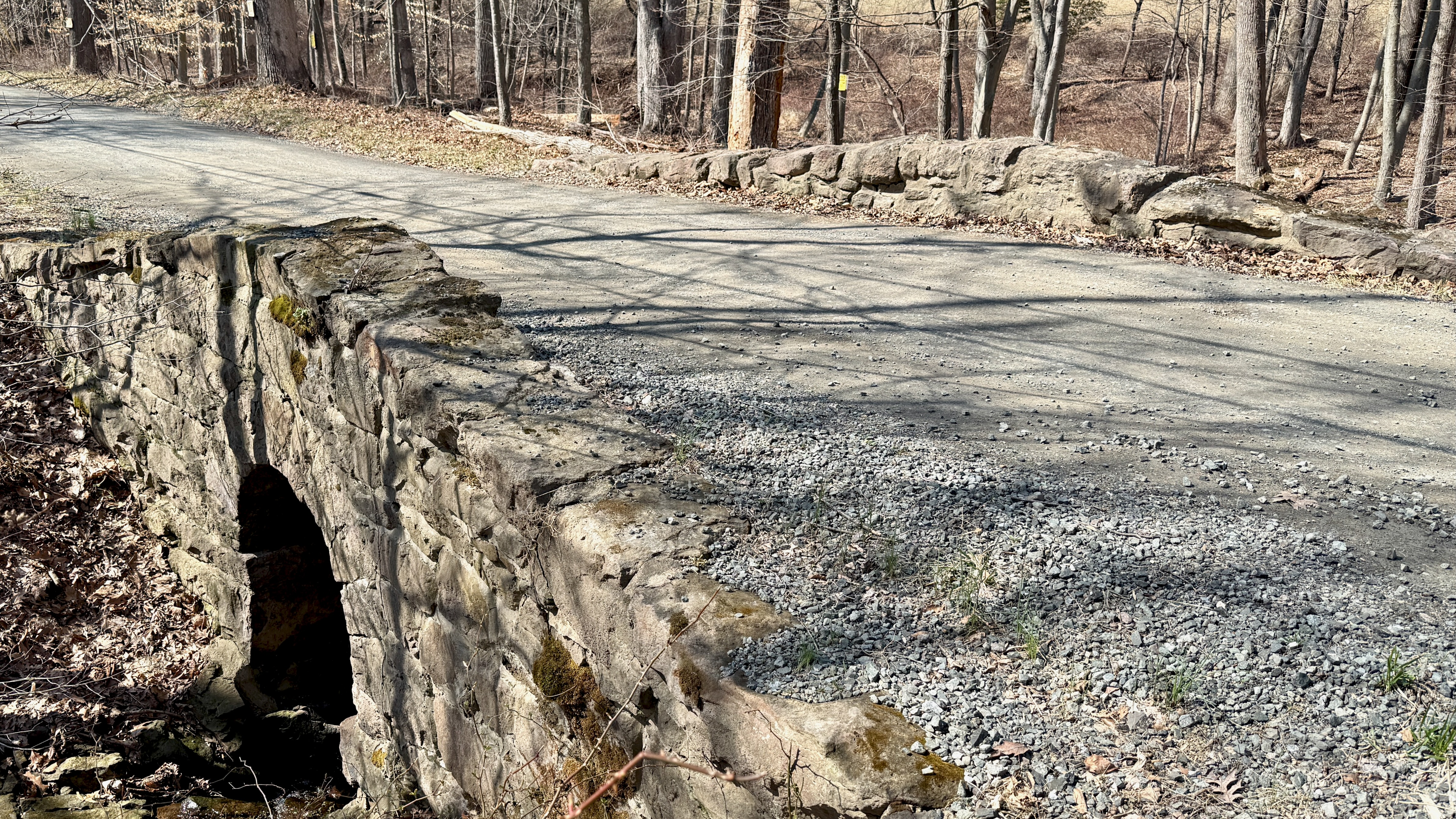

- Location within Hunterdon County, New Jersey Location within New Jersey Location within the United States
- Location: Worman Road at Shoppon’s Run, Delaware Township, Hunterdon County, New Jersey
- Coordinates: 40°25′33.8″N 74°57′48.8″W
- Built: 1883
- MPS: Historic Bridges of Delaware Township, Hunterdon County, New Jersey MPDF
- NRHP reference No.: 100012318
- NJRHP No.: 6087

Significant dates
- Added to NRHP: September 29, 2025
- Designated NJRHP: August 26, 2025

The Worman Road stone arch bridge over Shoppon's Run is a historic bridge located in Delaware Township in Hunterdon County, New Jersey, United States. Built in 1883, the stone arch bridge was added to the National Register of Historic Places on September 29, 2025, for its significance in engineering and transportation. It was listed as part of the Historic Bridges of Delaware Township, Hunterdon County, New Jersey Multiple Property Submission (MPS).

== History and description ==
The Worman Road stone arch bridge was built using local sandstone. It features a narrow (4 feet 6 inches (1.37 m)), semi-circular stone arch, which is skewed by 10 degrees. According to the nomination form, it embodies the distinctive characteristics of a 19th century stone arch bridge and the last one built in the township. Shoppon's Run is a tributary of the Wickecheoke Creek.

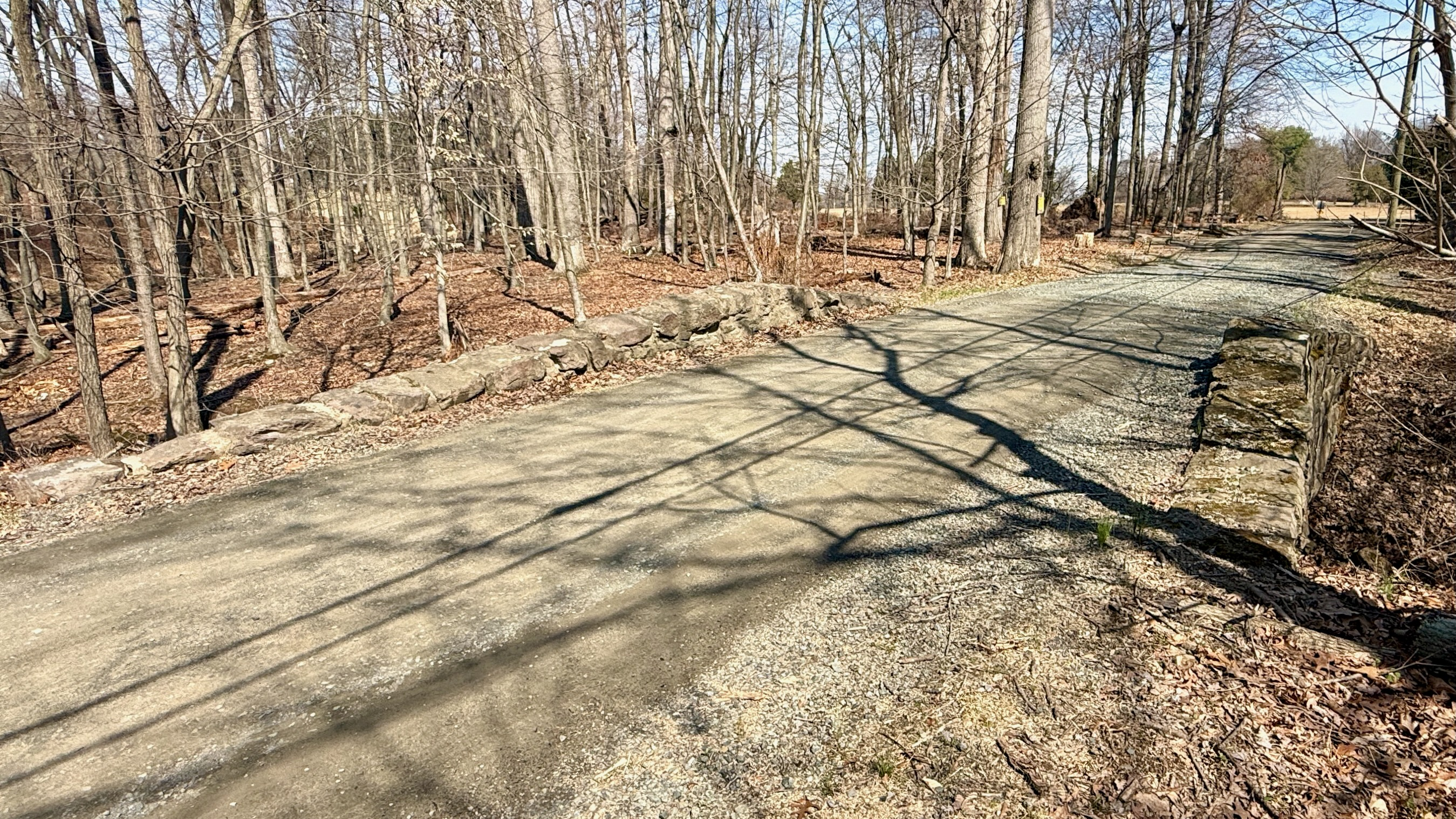
View of bridge looking east

== See also ==
- National Register of Historic Places listings in Hunterdon County, New Jersey
- List of bridges on the National Register of Historic Places in New Jersey
