= Palatine Road Bridge =

- Palatine Road Bridge over a minor tributary of the Lamington River
- U.S. National Register of Historic Places
- New Jersey Register of Historic Places
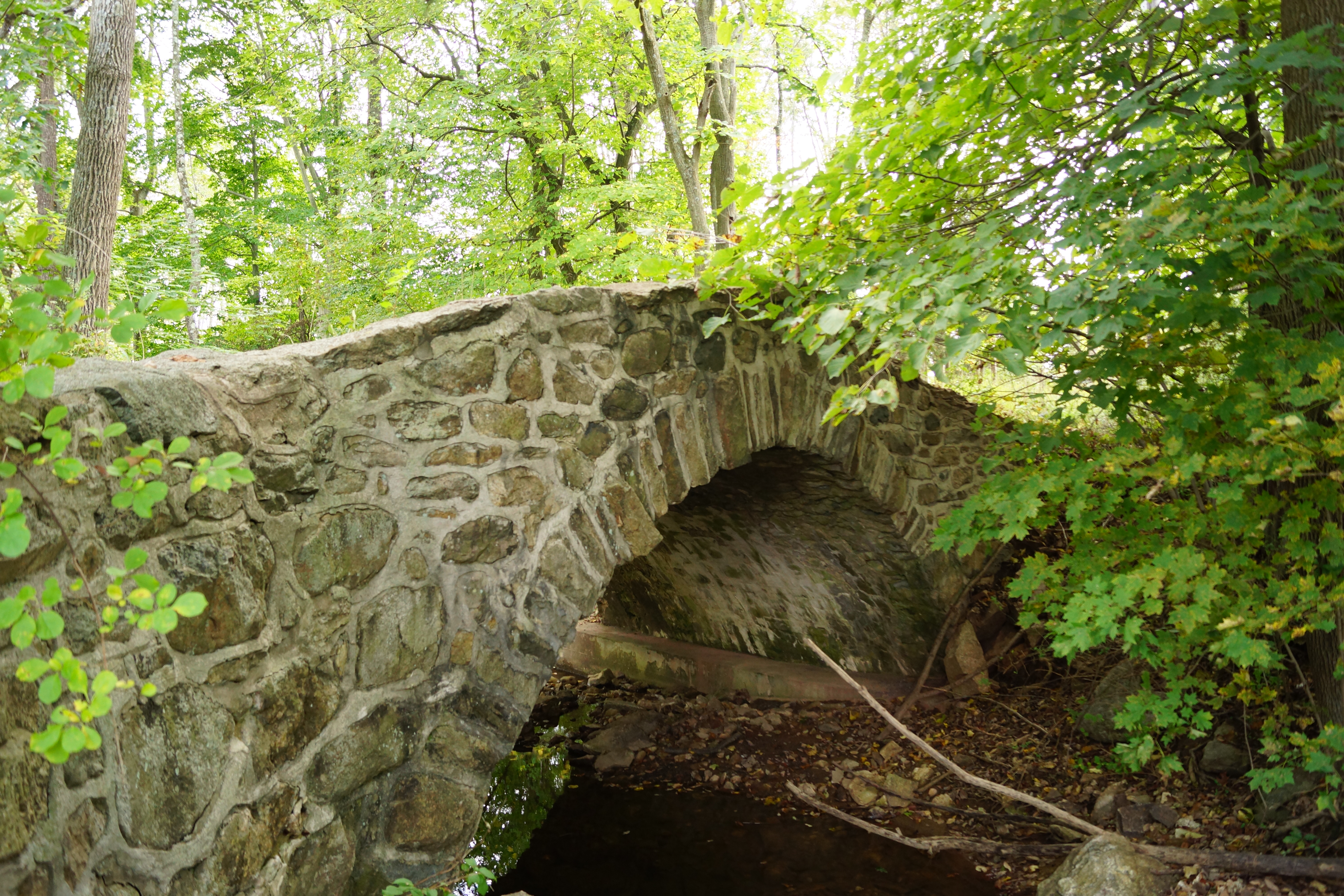

- Location within Hunterdon County, New Jersey Location within New Jersey Location within the United States
- Location: Palatine Road, near junction with Homestead and Cold Spring Roads, Tewksbury Township, New Jersey
- Coordinates: 40°41′58.8″N 74°44′47.6″W
- Built: 1900
- Built by: George Schuyler
- MPS: Historic Bridges of Tewksbury Township MPDF
- NRHP reference No.: 02001508
- NJRHP No.: 3953

Significant dates
- Added to NRHP: December 12, 2002
- Designated NJRHP: January 8, 2002

The Palatine Road Brige is a historic stone arch bridge that carries Palatine Road over a minor tributary of the Lamington River in Tewksbury Township of Hunterdon County, New Jersey, United States. Built in 1900 by George Schuyler, it was added to the National Register of Historic Places on December 12, 2002, for its significance in engineering and transportation. It was listed as part of the Historic Bridges of Tewksbury Township, Hunterdon County, New Jersey Multiple Property Submission (MPS).

The 22 foot (6.7 m) long single-arch rubble stone bridge is located near the intersection of Palatine Road with Homestead Road and Cold Spring Road. According to the nomination form, the county has over 100 surviving stone arch bridges, the largest concentration in North America.

== See also ==
- National Register of Historic Places listings in Hunterdon County, New Jersey
- List of bridges on the National Register of Historic Places in New Jersey
