= Randolphville Bridge =

- U.S. National Register of Historic Places
- New Jersey Register of Historic Places
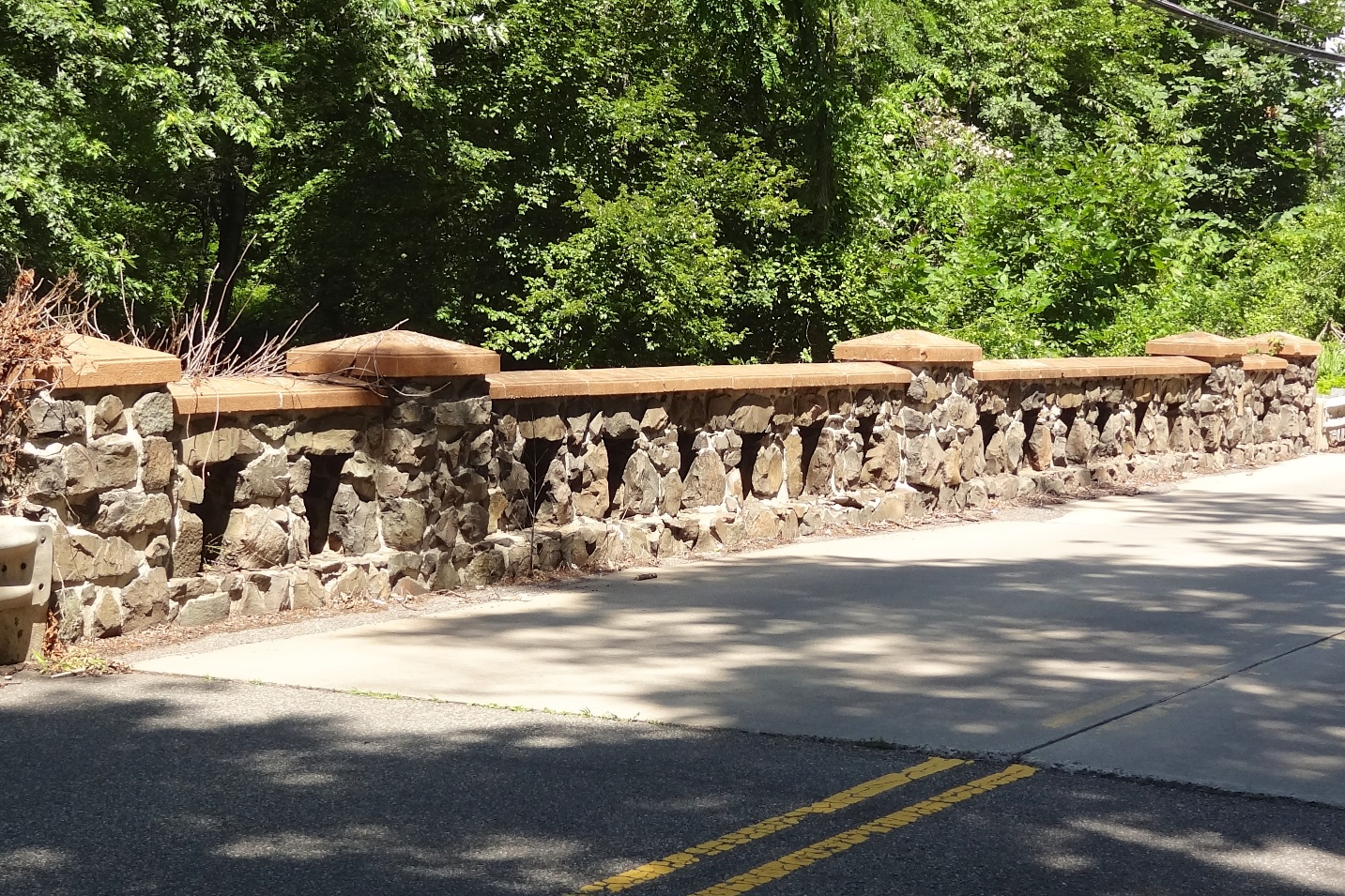

- Location within Middlesex County, New Jersey Location within New Jersey Location within the United States
- Location: Near 618 S. Randolphville Road, Piscataway, New Jersey
- Coordinates: 40°32′22.1″N 74°27′10.4″W
- Built: 1939
- NRHP reference No.: 99001169
- NJRHP No.: 278

Significant dates
- Added to NRHP: September 17, 1999
- Designated NJRHP: May 27, 1999

The Randolphville Bridge, also known as the South Randolphville Road Bridge over Ambrose Brook, is a historic road bridge located in the Randolphville section of the township of Piscataway in Middlesex County, New Jersey, United States. Completed in 1939, it was added to the National Register of Historic Places on September 17, 1999, for its significance in engineering and transportation.

== History and description ==
The two-span arch bridge was constructed from 1938 to 1939, funded by the Works Progress Administration. It carries South Randolphville Road over the Ambrose Brook. The use of ornamental stone parapet walls with decorative caps give it a rustic look.

== See also ==
- National Register of Historic Places listings in Middlesex County, New Jersey
- List of bridges on the National Register of Historic Places in New Jersey
- Ephraim Fitz-Randolph House
