= Randolphville, New Jersey =

Populated place in Middlesex County, New Jersey, US

- Unincorporated community
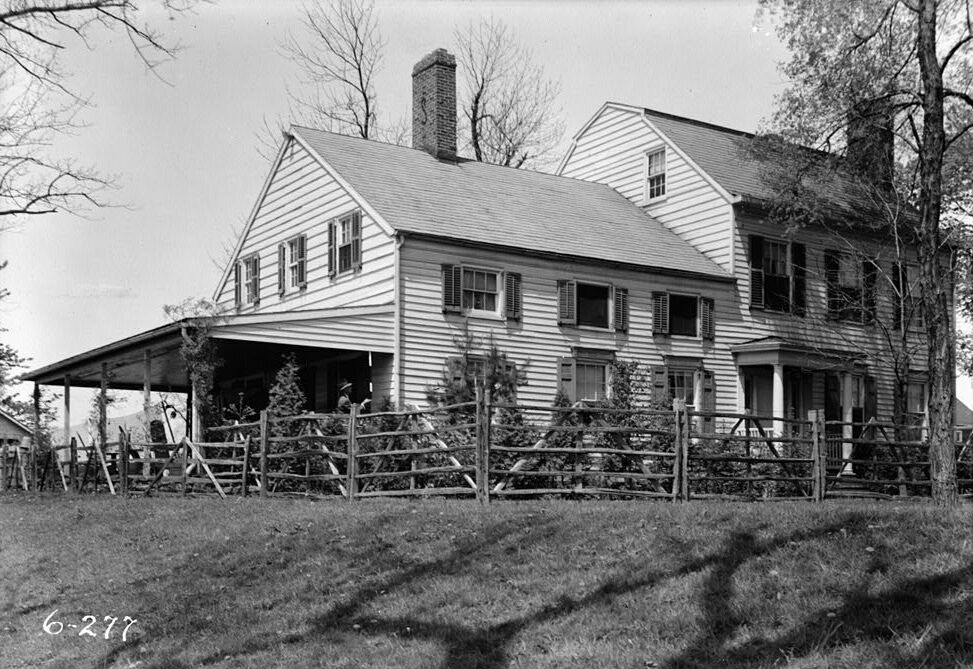
- Ephraim Fitz-Randolph House, listed on the National Register of Historic Places

- Location of Randolphville in Middlesex County Inset: Location of county within the state of New Jersey Randolphville (New Jersey) Randolphville (the United States)
- Coordinates: 40°32′22″N 74°27′07″W
- Country: United States
- State: New Jersey
- County: Middlesex
- Township: Piscataway
- Elevation: 59 ft (18 m)
- GNIS feature ID: 882986

Randolphville is an unincorporated community located within the township of Piscataway in Middlesex County, in the U.S. state of New Jersey. It is the location of the historic Randolphville Bridge, built in 1939.

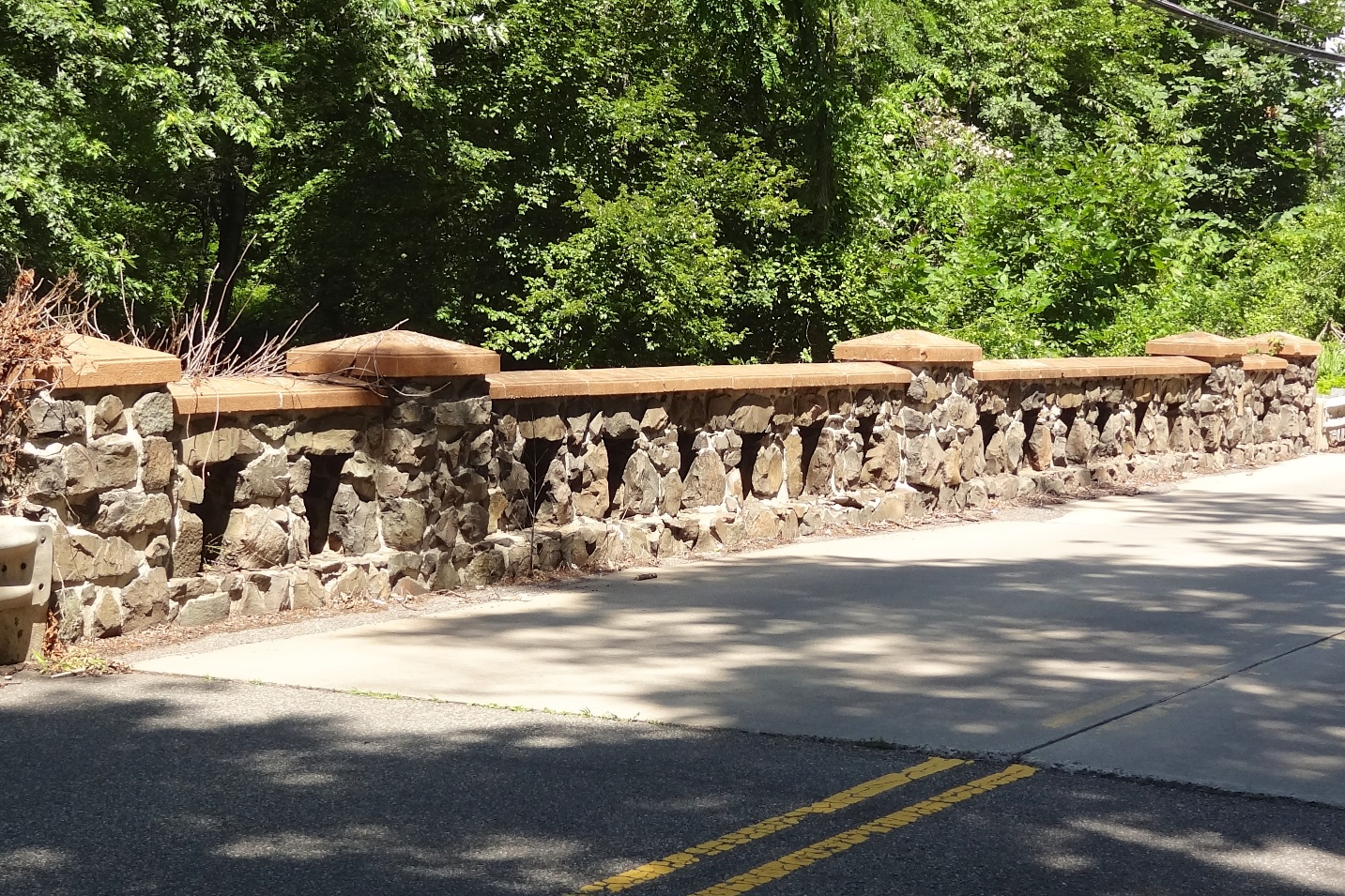
Randolphville Bridge

== History ==
The Randolph family settled in this area and built the Ephraim Fitz-Randolph House in 1825.
