= Peck's Ferry Bridge =

- U.S. National Register of Historic Places
- New Jersey Register of Historic Places
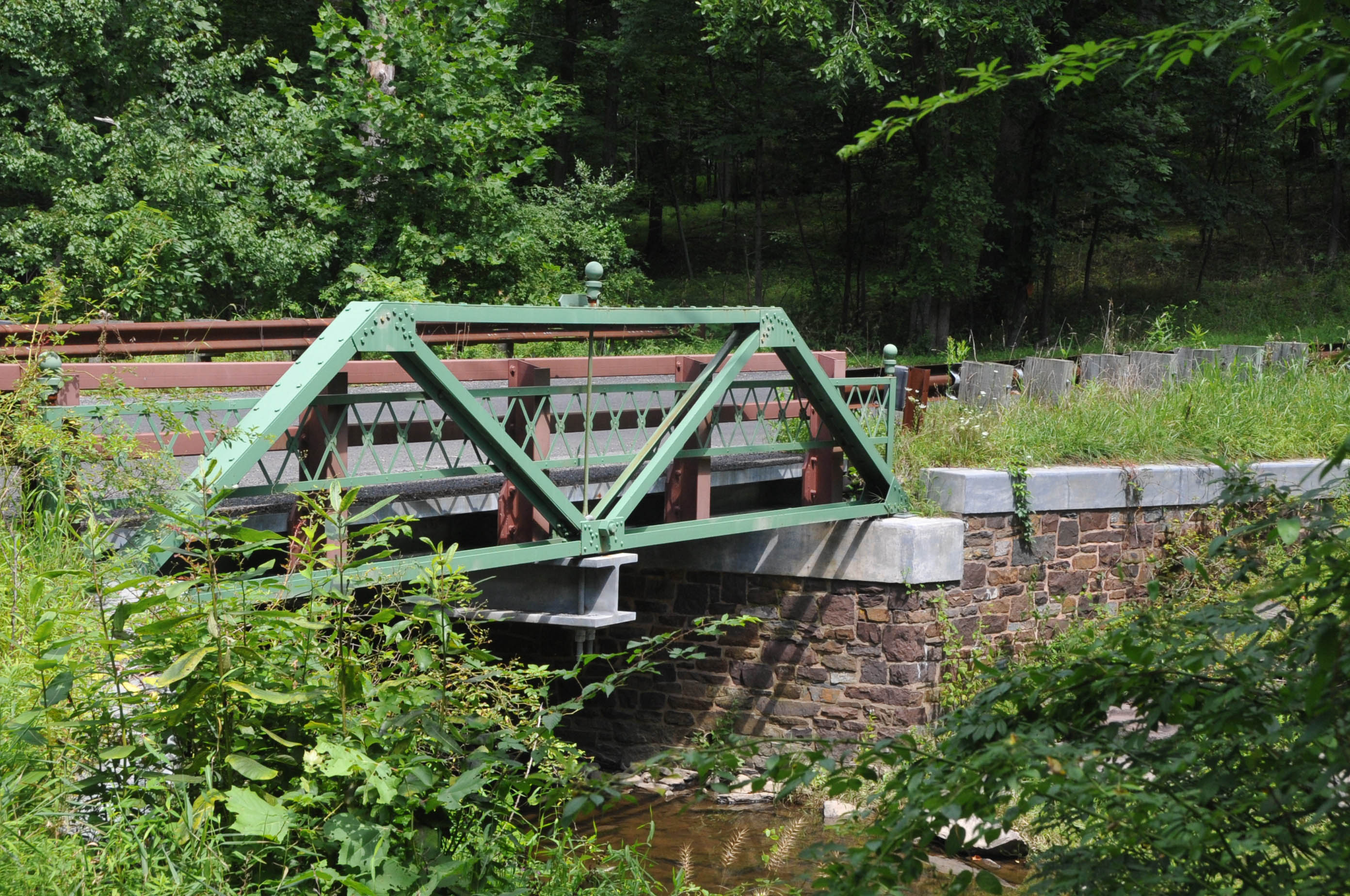
- 2004 Reconstruction

- Location within Hunterdon County, New Jersey Location within New Jersey Location within the United States
- Location: Locktown-Flemington Road over Plum Brook, Delaware Township
- Coordinates: 40°29′03″N 74°56′36.5″W
- Built: 1900
- Built by: J. W. Scott
- NRHP reference No.: 99001313
- NJRHP No.: 259

Significant dates
- Added to NRHP: November 12, 1999
- Designated NJRHP: July 16, 1999

The Peck's Ferry Bridge is a historic Warren truss bridge that carries Locktown–Flemington Road over Plum Brook in Delaware Township of Hunterdon County, New Jersey, United States. Built in 1900 by John W. Scott of Flemington, it was added to the National Register of Historic Places on November 12, 1999, for its significance in engineering. It was reconstructed in 2004.

== History and description ==
The 29 foot (8.8 m) long single-span bridge crosses Plum Brook, a tributary of the Wickecheoke Creek, which flows into the Delaware River at Prallsville. According to the nomination form, it is a modified Warren truss bridge. Scott also built the nearby Stone Sign Post Road Bridge over Plum Brook.

== See also ==
- National Register of Historic Places listings in Hunterdon County, New Jersey
- List of bridges on the National Register of Historic Places in New Jersey
