= Lower Creek Road truss bridge over the Wickecheoke Creek =

- U.S. National Register of Historic Places
- New Jersey Register of Historic Places
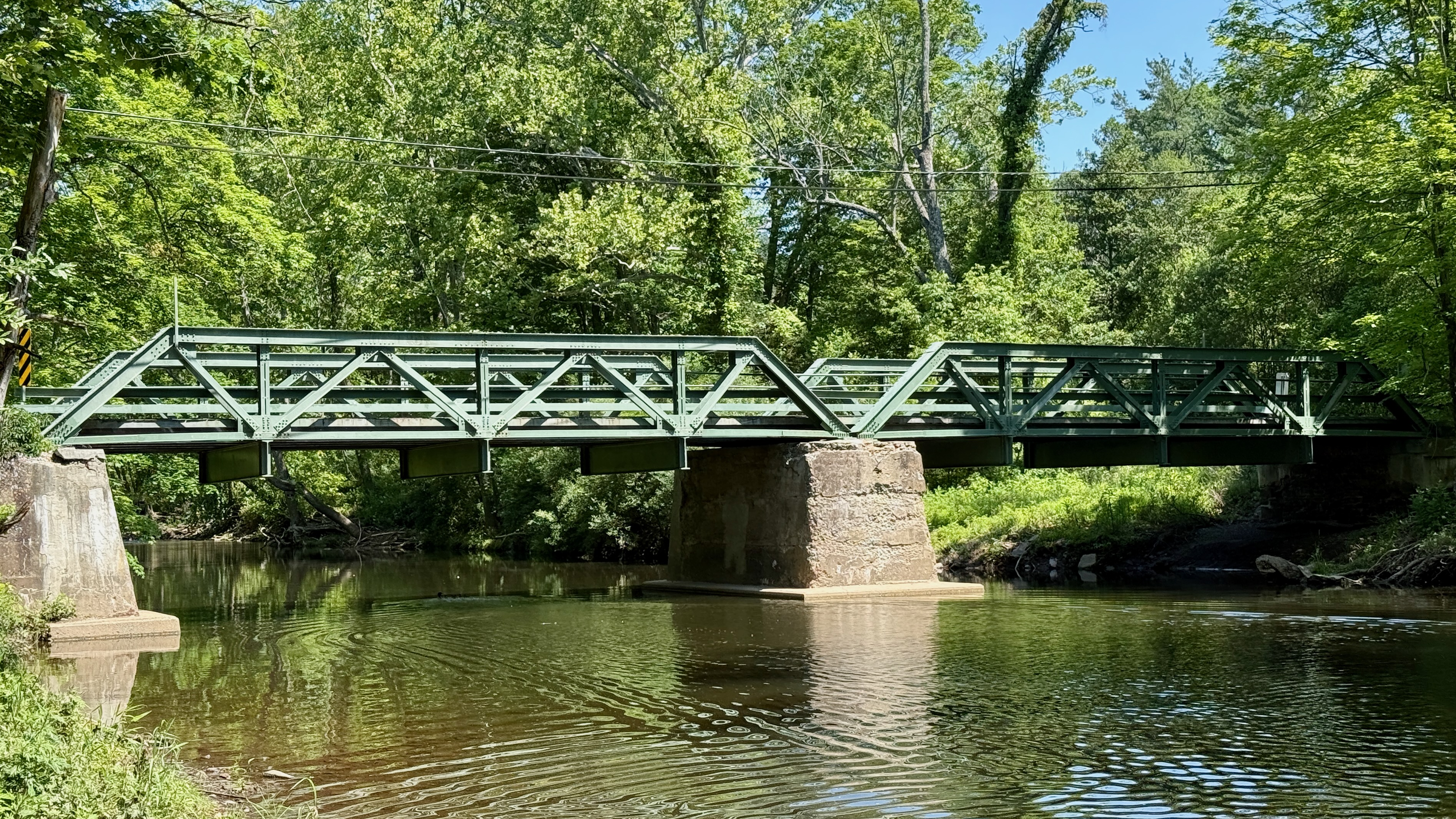

- Location within Hunterdon County, New Jersey Location within New Jersey Location within the United States
- Location: Lower Creek Road over the Wickecheoke Creek, Delaware Township, Hunterdon County, New Jersey
- Coordinates: 40°25′18.7″N 74°58′47.1″W
- Built: c. 1915
- Built by: Eastern Steel Company
- MPS: Historic Bridges of Delaware Township, Hunterdon County, New Jersey MPDF
- NRHP reference No.: 100011840
- NJRHP No.: 6056

Significant dates
- Added to NRHP: May 23, 2025
- Designated NJRHP: April 8, 2025

The Lower Creek Road truss bridge over the Wickecheoke Creek is a historic Warren truss bridge located in Delaware Township in Hunterdon County, New Jersey, United States. Built around 1915, it was added to the National Register of Historic Places on May 23, 2025, for its significance in engineering and transportation. It was listed as part of the Historic Bridges of Delaware Township, Hunterdon County, New Jersey Multiple Property Submission (MPS).

== History and description ==
The oldest parts of the bridge, the abutment and wingwalls, are from 1899. The single-lane, two-span Warren pony truss bridge over the Wickecheoke Creek was built around 1915 by the Eastern Steel Company of Pottstown, Pennsylvania. It is located near the Wickecheoke Creek Preserve managed by the New Jersey Conservation Foundation.

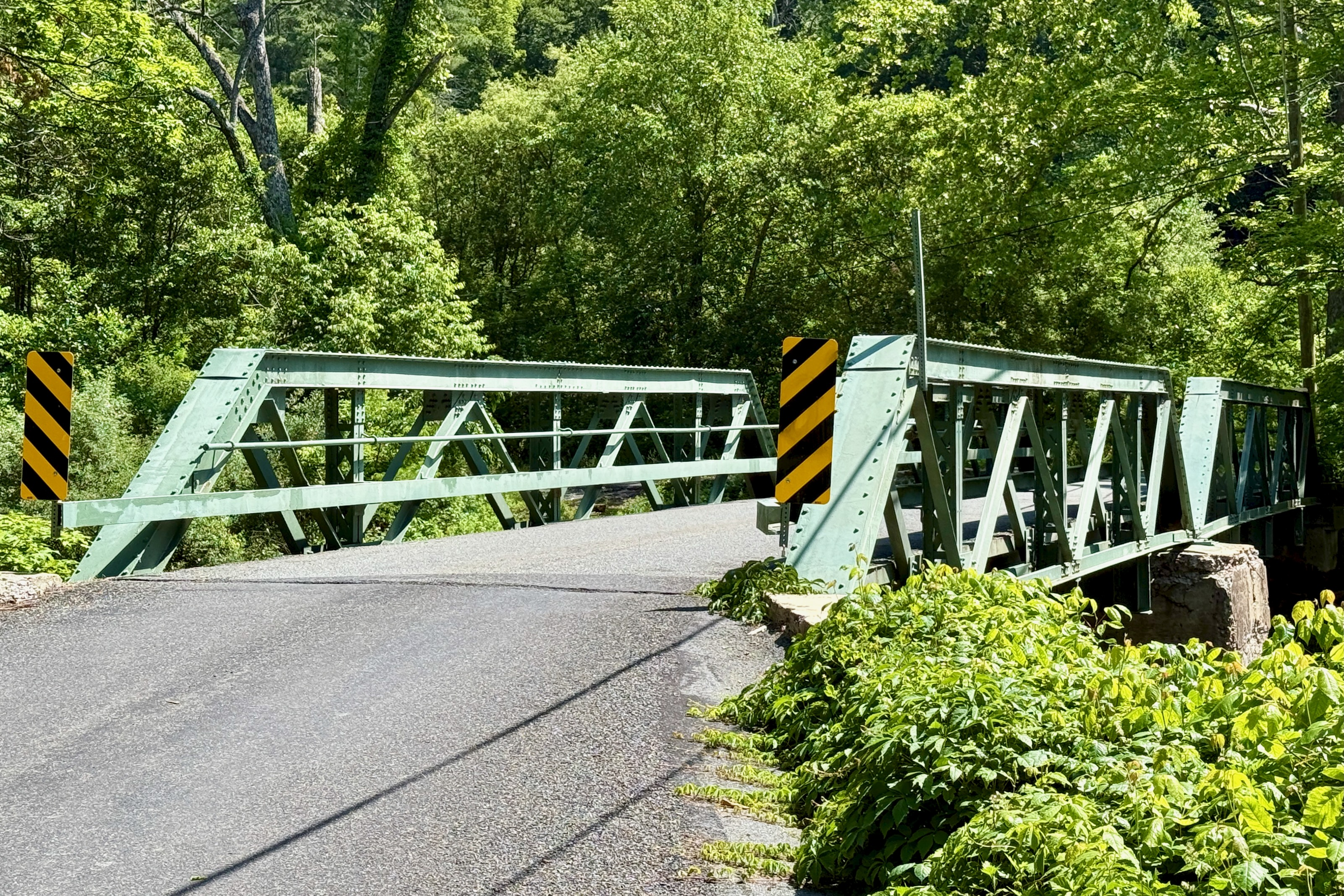
View of bridge looking northeast

== See also ==
- National Register of Historic Places listings in Hunterdon County, New Jersey
- List of bridges on the National Register of Historic Places in New Jersey
