= Hollow Brook Road Bridge =

- Hollow Brook Road Bridge over tributary of the Lamington River
- U.S. National Register of Historic Places
- New Jersey Register of Historic Places
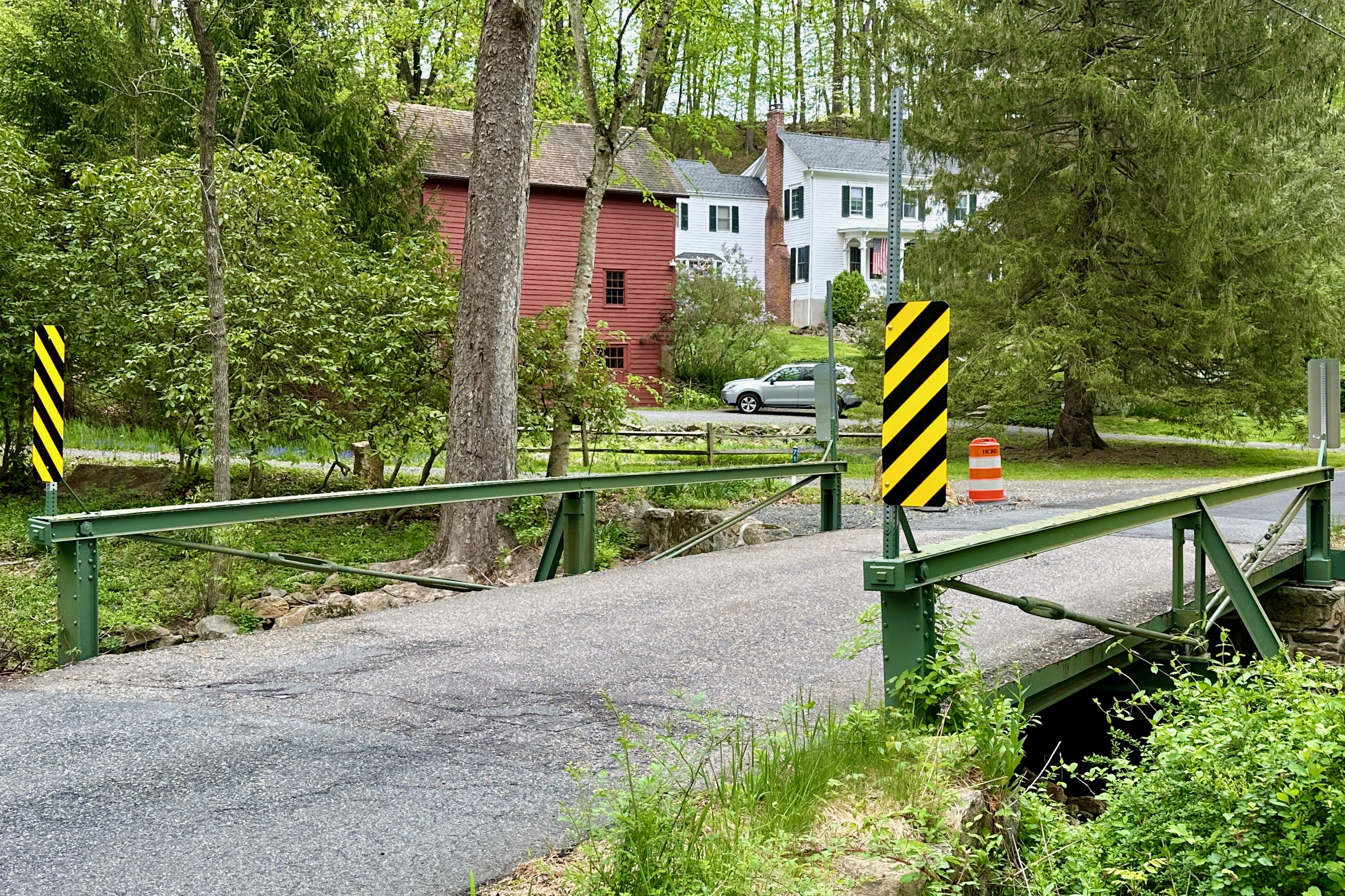

- Location within Hunterdon County, New Jersey Location within New Jersey Location within the United States
- Location: Hollow Brook Road, Tewksbury Township, New Jersey
- Coordinates: 40°43′02.3″N 74°44′10.5″W
- Built: c. 1880
- MPS: Historic Bridges of Tewksbury Township MPDF
- NRHP reference No.: 02001510
- NJRHP No.: 3765

Significant dates
- Added to NRHP: December 12, 2002
- Designated NJRHP: January 8, 2002

The Hollow Brook Road Bridge is a historic truss bridge that carries Hollow Brook Road over a tributary of the Lamington River in Tewksbury Township of Hunterdon County, New Jersey, United States. Built around 1880, the steel bridge was added to the National Register of Historic Places on December 12, 2002, for its significance in engineering and transportation. It was listed as part of the Historic Bridges of Tewksbury Township, Hunterdon County, New Jersey Multiple Property Submission (MPS).

The bridge is a single-span, pony truss bridge that carries a narrow road over the Hollow Brook, a tributary of the Lamington River. It was built using a variation of a Bollman truss or Fink truss. According to the nomination form, this is the only example in the county of this type.

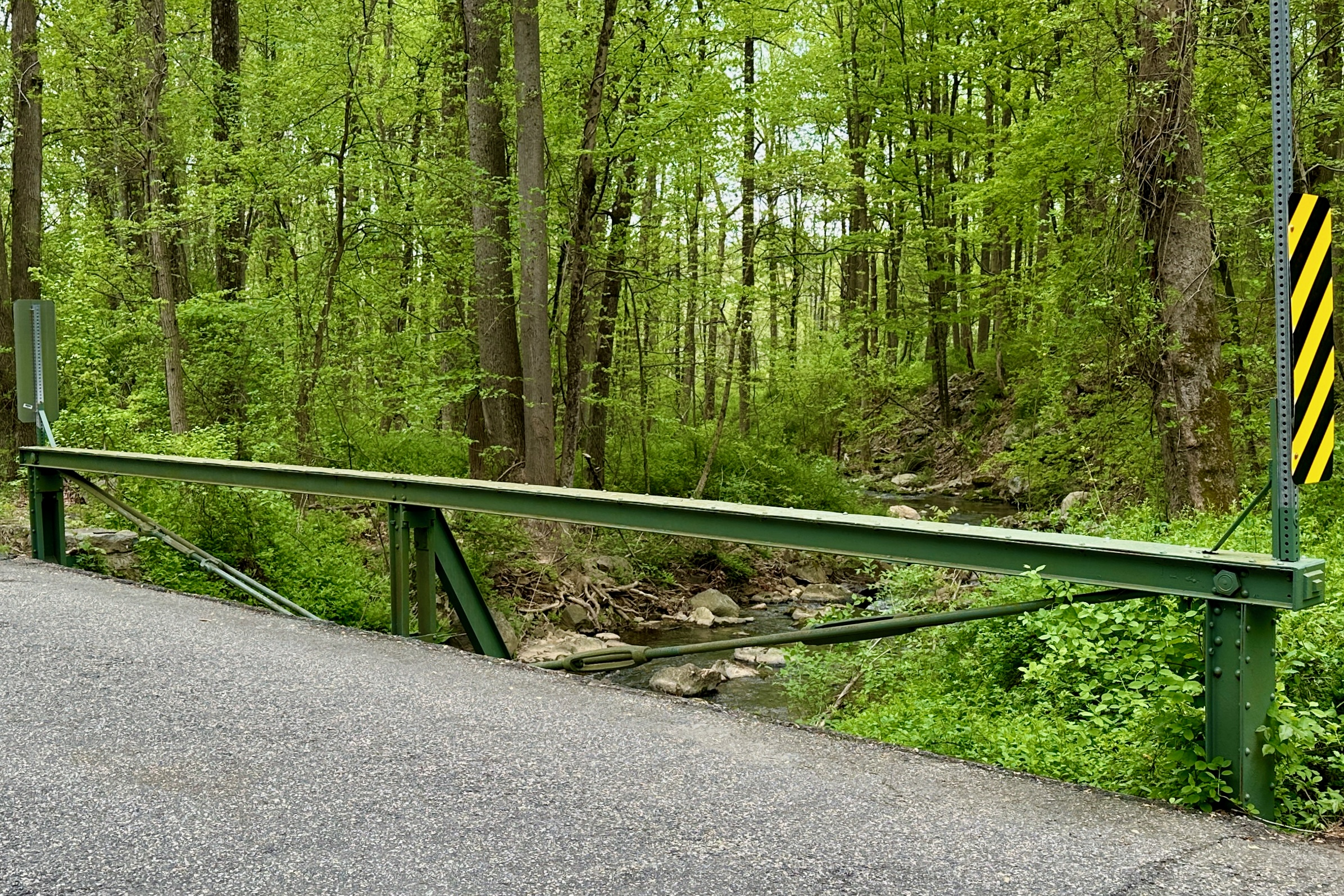
View of the Hollow Brook flowing to the southeast

== See also ==
- National Register of Historic Places listings in Hunterdon County, New Jersey
- List of bridges on the National Register of Historic Places in New Jersey
