= Miller Farmstead (Penwell, New Jersey) =

- U.S. National Register of Historic Places
- U.S. Historic district
- New Jersey Register of Historic Places
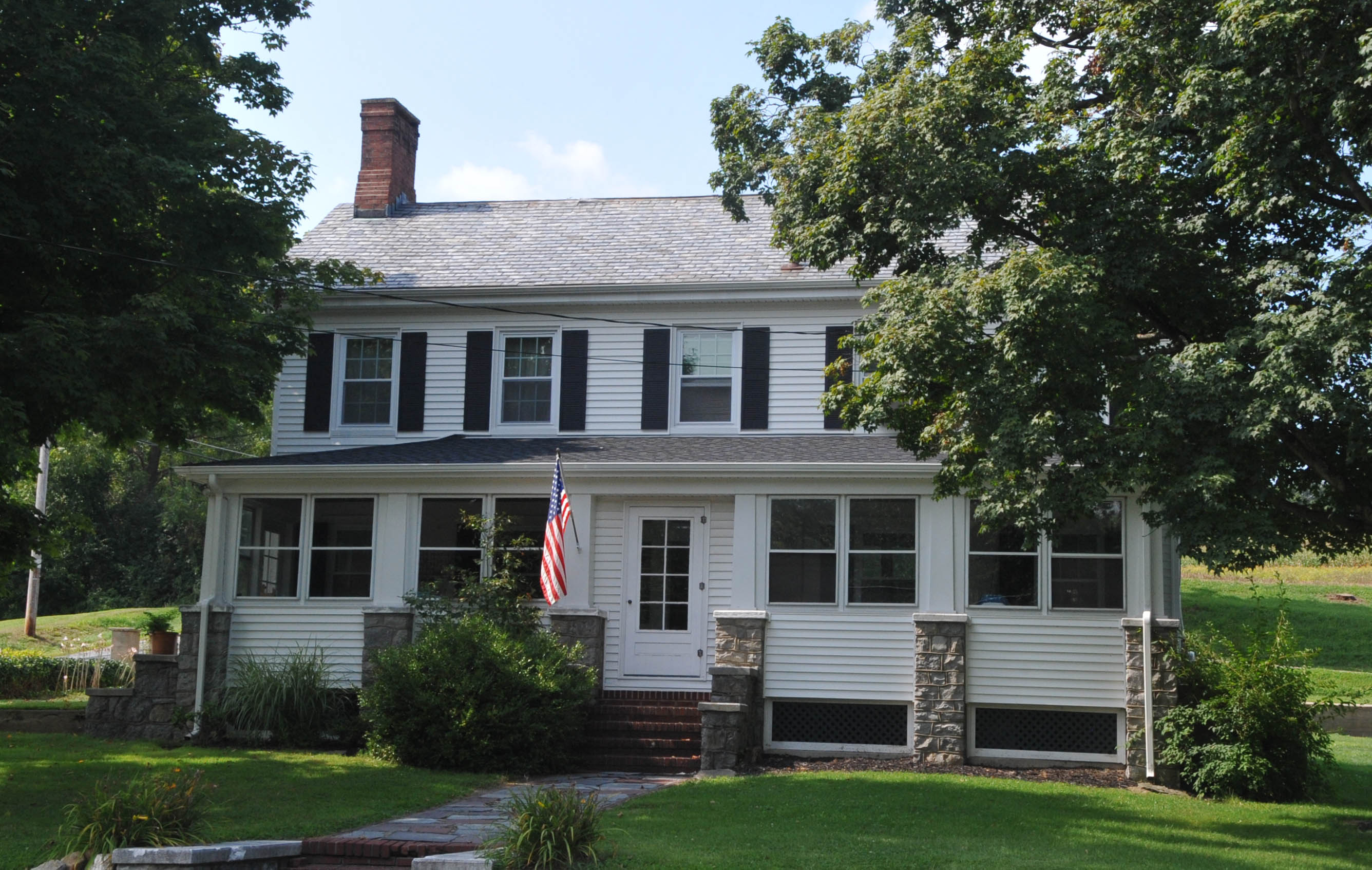
- Main farmhouse

- Location within Warren County, New Jersey Location within New Jersey Location within the United States
- Coordinates: 40°47′09″N 74°53′42″W
- Area: 108 acres (44 ha)
- Architectural style: Greek Revival
- NRHP reference No.: 88002118
- NJRHP No.: 2271

Significant dates
- Added to NRHP: September 11, 1989
- Designated NJRHP: September 28, 1988

The Miller Farmstead is a historic district encompassing the main farm complex on Route 57, at Watters Road, in Mansfield Township, Warren County, New Jersey and extending into Lebanon Township, Hunterdon County. The farmstead is near the community of Penwell and overlooks the Musconetcong River, arranged linearly along the upper edge of the river's flood plain. It was added to the National Register of Historic Places on September 11, 1989, for its significance in agriculture, architecture, and transportation from 1830 to 1924. The listing is a 108 acres (44 ha) area that includes eight contributing buildings, seven contributing structures, and a contributing site.

The main farmhouse, at the intersection of Route 57 and Watters Road, shows Greek Revival style. It was likely built in the 1830s or 1840s. One of the contributing structures is a triple-arch stone bridge, the Old Turnpike Road over Musconetcong River bridge. The bridge spans into Lebanon Township in Hunterdon County. It was built in 1860 by J.C. Miller and J.A. Skinner, according to a marble plaque on one of the sidewalls.

== Gallery ==
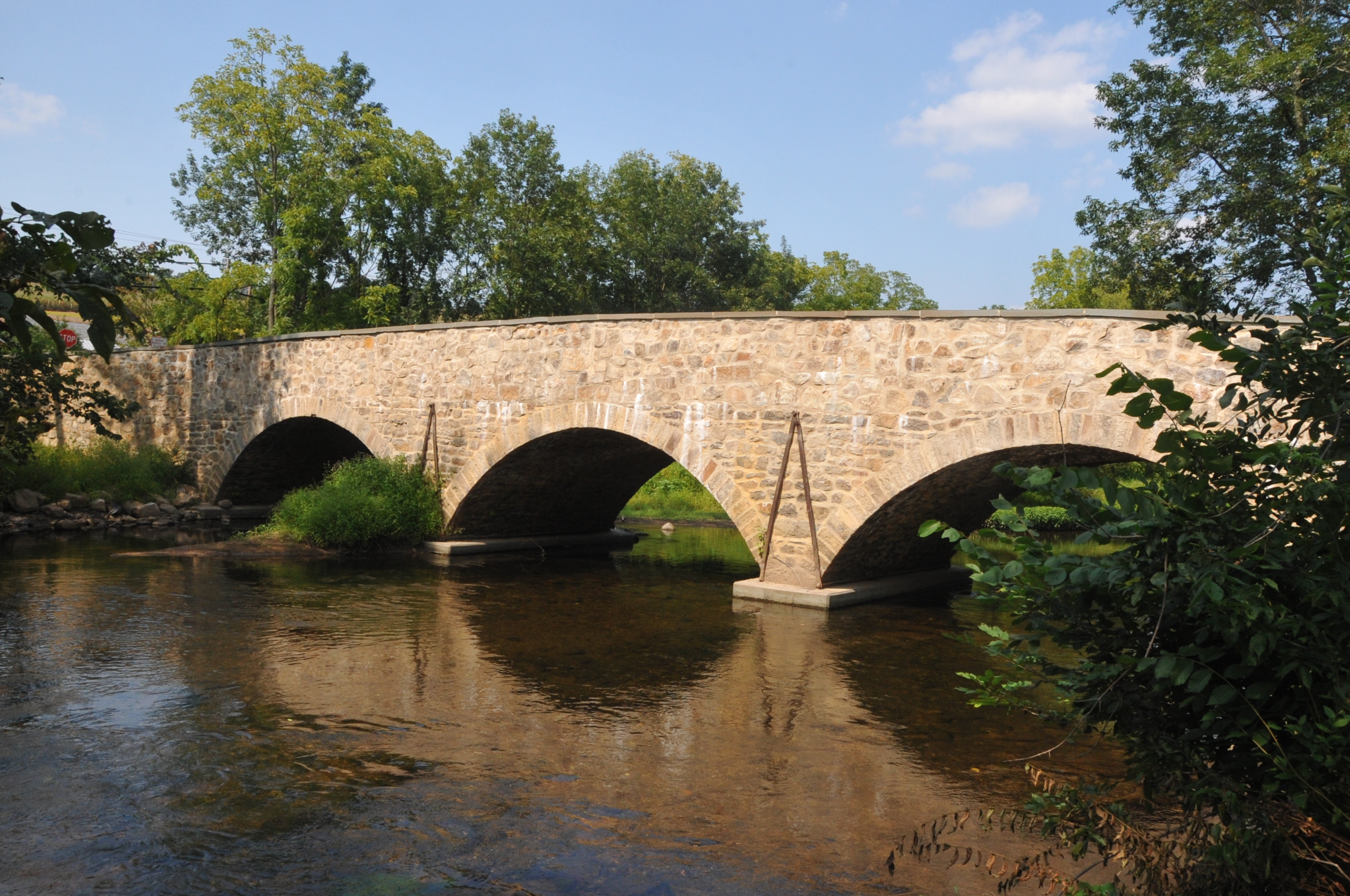
Triple Arch Stone Bridge over the Musconetcong River

== See also ==
- National Register of Historic Places listings in Warren County, New Jersey
- National Register of Historic Places listings in Hunterdon County, New Jersey
- List of bridges on the National Register of Historic Places in New Jersey
