= Ephraim Fitz-Randolph House =

Historic house in New Jersey, United States

- U.S. National Register of Historic Places
- New Jersey Register of Historic Places
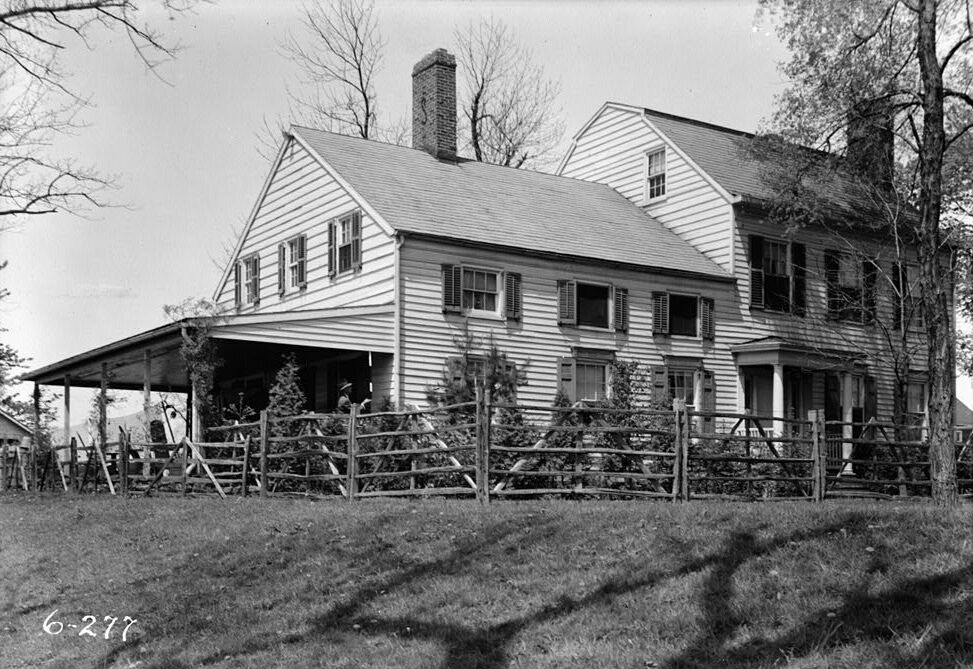
- Southwest view from 1936

- Location within Middlesex County, New Jersey Location within New Jersey Location within the United States
- Location: 430 S. Randolphville Road, Piscataway, New Jersey
- Coordinates: 40°32′56″N 74°27′45″W
- Area: 15 acres (6.1 ha)
- Built: 1825
- Architect: Ephraim Fitz Randolph
- NRHP reference No.: 73001114
- NJRHP No.: 1910

Significant dates
- Added to NRHP: March 14, 1973
- Designated NJRHP: August 2, 1972

The Ephraim Fitz-Randolph House is a historic house located at 430 S. Randolphville Road in the Randolphville section of Piscataway in Middlesex County, New Jersey. Built in 1825, it was documented by the Historic American Buildings Survey in 1936. The house was added to the National Register of Historic Places on March 14, 1973, for its significance in architecture.

== History and description ==
Benjamin F. Randolph, originally Fitz-Randolph, emigrated from England in 1684. His son Moleson settled in Middlesex County. His son Ruene's son Ephraim, born in 1786, was the builder of the two-story frame house. Staats F. Randolph purchased it in 1858.

== See also ==
- National Register of Historic Places listings in Middlesex County, New Jersey
- Randolphville Bridge
