= Hardenburgh Avenue Bridge =

Bridge in Demarest, New Jersey, US

- U.S. National Register of Historic Places
- New Jersey Register of Historic Places
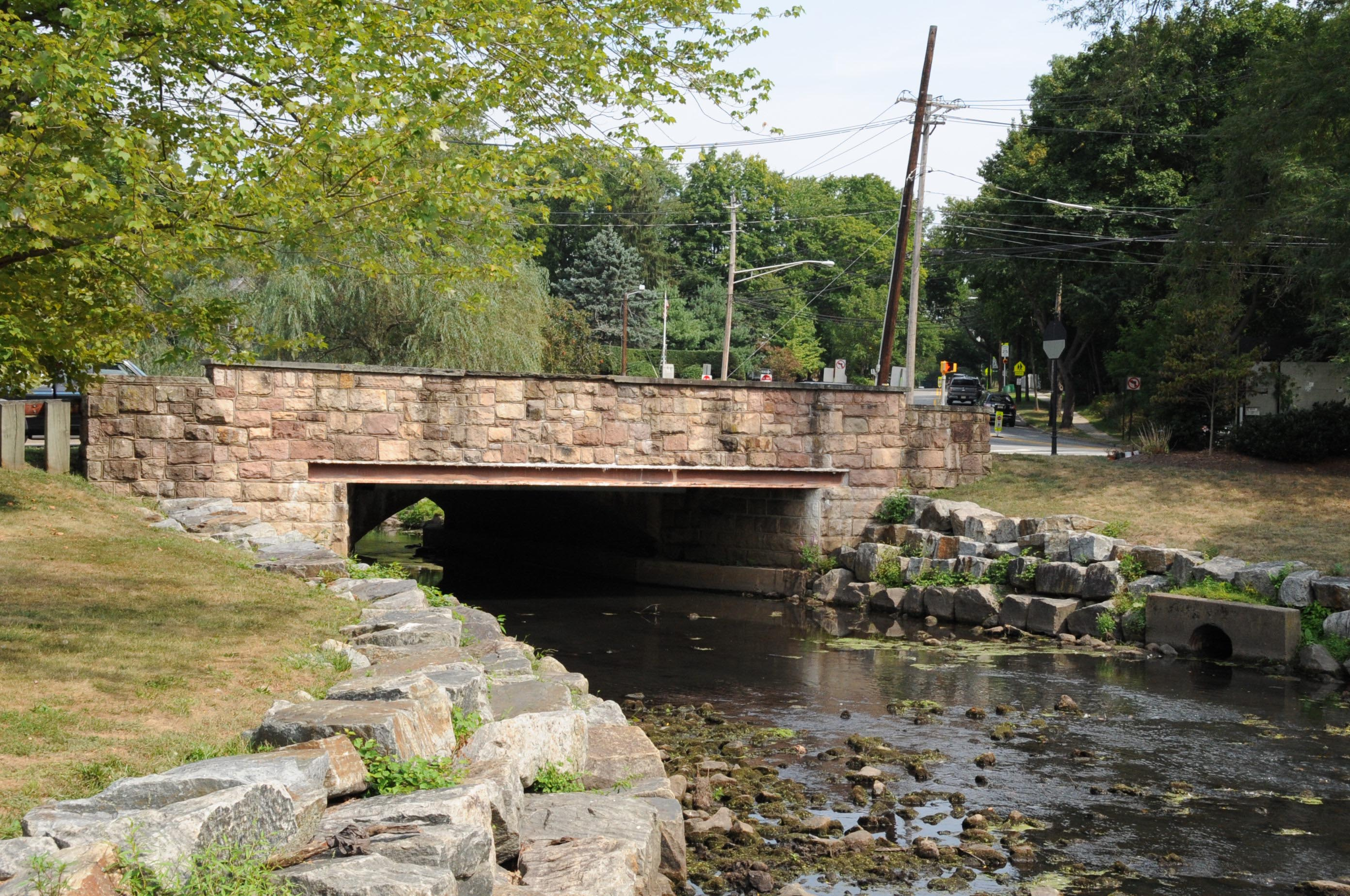

- Location within Bergen County, New Jersey Location within New Jersey Location within the United States
- Location: Hardenburgh Avenue over the Tenakill Brook, Demarest, New Jersey
- Coordinates: 40.9571°N 73.9623°W
- Area: 0.1 acres (0.040 ha)
- Built: 1875
- Architects: Earle, Ralph Jr.
- NRHP reference No.: 01000237
- NJRHP No.: 1861

Significant dates
- Added to NRHP: March 12, 2001
- Designated NJRHP: January 25, 2001

The Hardenburgh Avenue Bridge is located in Demarest, Bergen County, United States. Constructed in 1875, the bridge crosses the Tenakill Brook and was added to the National Register of Historic Places on March 12, 2001.

== See also ==
- National Register of Historic Places listings in Bergen County, New Jersey
- List of bridges on the National Register of Historic Places in New Jersey
