= Frog Hollow Road Bridge =

- Frog Hollow Road Bridge over minor tributary of the South Branch Raritan River
- U.S. National Register of Historic Places
- New Jersey Register of Historic Places
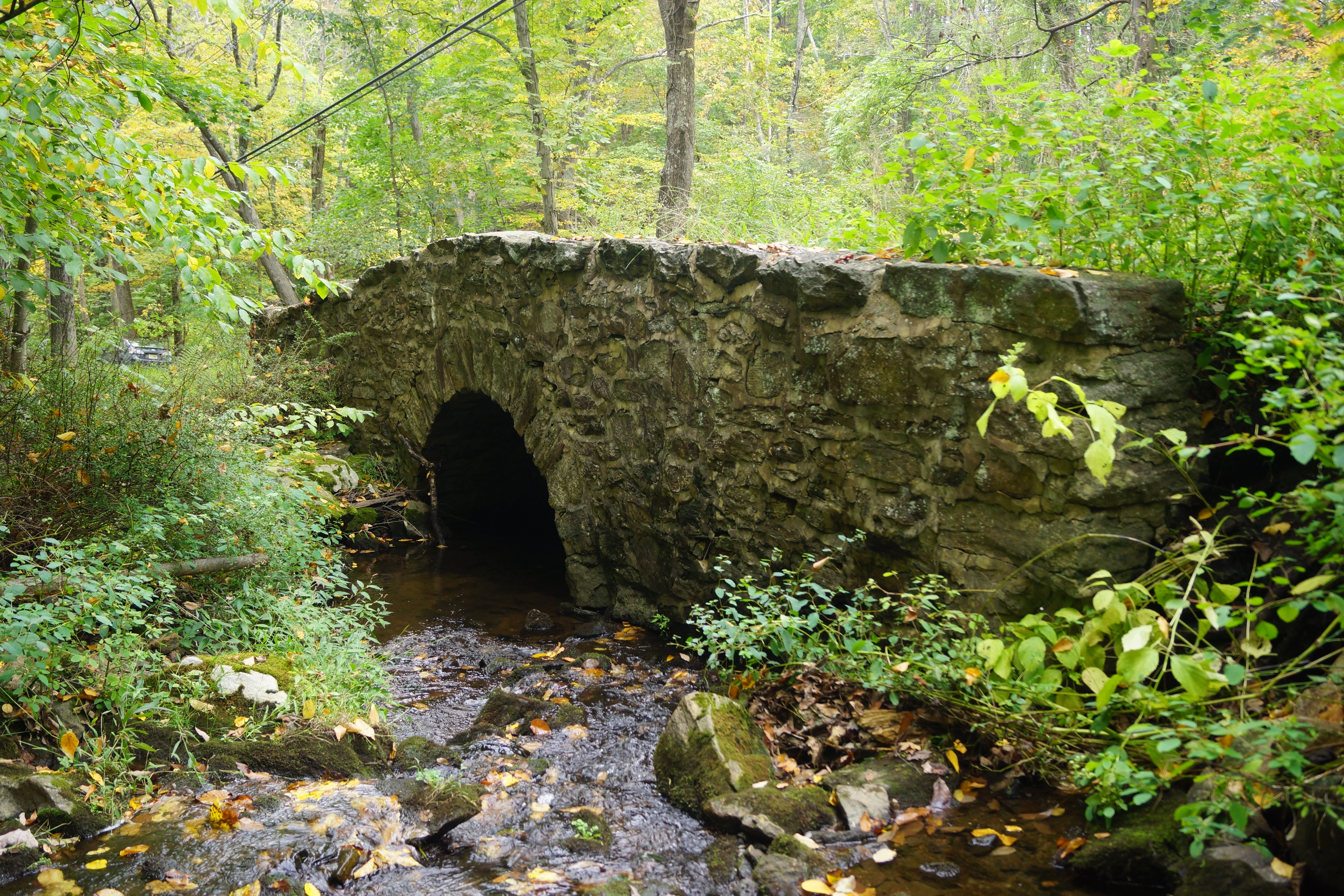

- Location within Hunterdon County, New Jersey Location within New Jersey Location within the United States
- Location: Frog Hollow Road, Tewksbury Township, New Jersey
- Coordinates: 40°43′48.4″N 74°49′06″W
- Built: c. 1860–1873
- MPS: Historic Bridges of Tewksbury Township MPDF
- NRHP reference No.: 02001509
- NJRHP No.: 3952

Significant dates
- Added to NRHP: December 12, 2002
- Designated NJRHP: January 8, 2002

The Frog Hollow Road Bridge is a historic stone arch bridge that carries Frog Hollow Road over a minor tributary of the South Branch Raritan River in Tewksbury Township of Hunterdon County, New Jersey, United States. Built between 1860 and 1873, it was added to the National Register of Historic Places on December 12, 2002, for its significance in engineering and transportation. It was listed as part of the Historic Bridges of Tewksbury Township, Hunterdon County, New Jersey Multiple Property Submission (MPS).

The bridge is a single-arch rubble stone bridge that carries a narrow rural road over Frog Hollow Brook, a minor tributary of the South Branch Raritan River. The brook joins the river at Califon. According to the nomination form, it is "characterized by extraordinarily rough construction".

== See also ==
- National Register of Historic Places listings in Hunterdon County, New Jersey
- List of bridges on the National Register of Historic Places in New Jersey
