= Old Stone Arch Bridge (Bound Brook, New Jersey) =

- U.S. National Register of Historic Places
- New Jersey Register of Historic Places
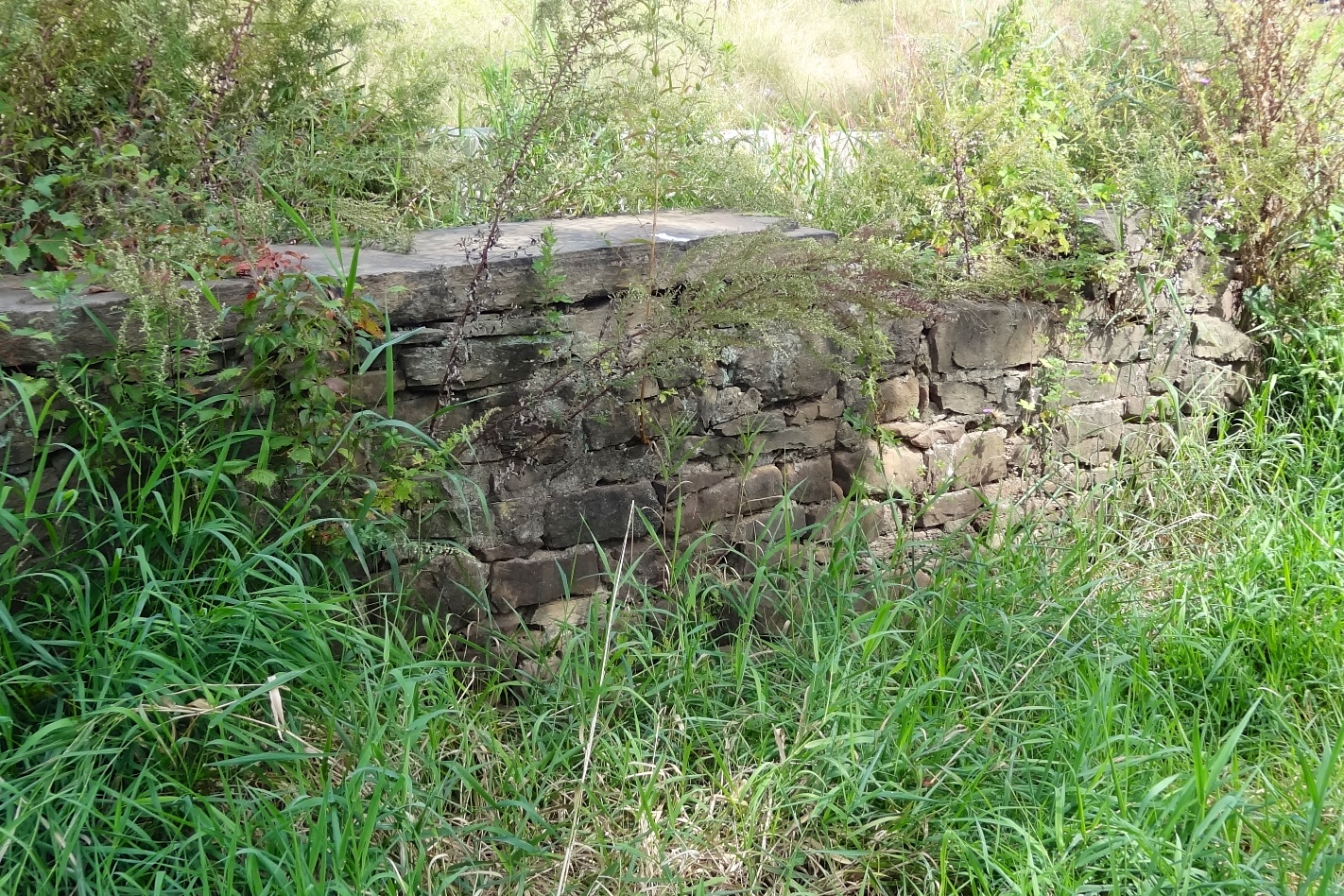
- Old Stone Arch Bridge

- Location within Somerset County, New Jersey Location within New Jersey Location within the United States
- Location: Railroad Avenue, approximately 194 feet east of South Main Street; Bound Brook, New Jersey
- Coordinates: 40°33′38″N 74°31′37″W
- Area: less than one acre
- Built: 1730
- Architectural style: Stone Arch bridge
- NRHP reference No.: 08000550
- NJRHP No.: 4773

Significant dates
- Added to NRHP: June 27, 2008
- Designated NJRHP: May 7, 2008

The Old Stone Arch Bridge is a bridge located in Bound Brook, New Jersey, United States. It is the second-oldest extant bridge in the US, after the Frankford Avenue Bridge (built in 1697) over Pennypack Creek in North Philadelphia, Pennsylvania. Built in 1731, it is the oldest bridge in New Jersey. It spans the Green Brook and connects Bound Brook (Somerset County) with Middlesex Borough (Middlesex County) in northern central New Jersey.

The bridge also carried the Great Road Up Raritan, laid out in 1681, which was created by an act of the assembly of the Province of East Jersey. In 1764, the colonial highway, west of what is now Lambertville on the Delaware River and east of Elizabethtown Point on Newark Bay, was christened Old York Road. The highway represented the shortest route between Philadelphia and New York City (reached by ferry). It was built shortly after the King's Highway and called a variety of names, but it was most prominently known as the Upper Road when the Assunpink Trail was widened. The bridge allowed farmers, plantation owners, and all those west and north of the Raritan River a direct route to the colonial ports of New Brunswick and Raritan Landing. Since the early 1870s, the Old Stone Arch Bridge has been buried up to the parapets due to the construction of a railroad embankment.

== Description ==
The bridge, supposedly made from locally quarried rough-hewn masonry and stone, is a classic, three-arch edifice. The center span is approximately 17.9 feet (5.5 m) wide with two side arches that are approximately 12.5 feet (3.8 m) and 12.25 feet (3.73 m) on the west and east sides respectively. Only a sign, often hidden behind weeds, wild bushes and large trucks or trailers that park alongside it, identifies what lies beneath. The roadway between the exposed south and non-visible north parapet, which may at some point have been widened, is approximately 26 feet (7.9 m) in width. It is about 79.5 feet (24.2 m) long, more than the Pennypack Creek Bridge. Only the south parapet and a spandrel, 4 feet (1.2 m) in the center and 6 feet (1.8 m) at each end, are visible. It is believed to indicate that prior to the original roadway's flattening, it was a typical humpback or camelback bridge. A concrete barrier was installed several years ago to protect the south parapet.

The novelty of the bridge remains additionally reinforced by the fact that the first bridges in New Jersey, constructed within colonial times, were a few logs dropped across a stream with sawn timbers fastened to them to provide a flat, relatively even surface, with the occasional inclusion of a handrail. Most were funded by local municipalities. Today in regions of central and northern New Jersey that have access to mountainous terrain where stone is abundant, bridges are almost exclusively stone arch bridges. Most of them were constructed between the 1820s and early 1900s. There are a few in the southern portions of the state, which may have resulted from smaller quantities of congestion and less abundant stone.

== Endangered status ==
As the bridge had been buried for over 140 years, it is listed by Preservation New Jersey as one of the "10 Most Endangered Historic Sites in New Jersey". However, Somerset County's Cultural and Heritage Commission has reported that the county invested almost $100,000 to unearth and restore the state's most historic bridge. The project had full cooperation from its neighboring Middlesex County Cultural and Heritage Commission and the county has assumed responsibility for the structure. The bridge was additionally placed on the National Register of Historic Places in 2008.

== Communities ==
The center of the bridge is on the border between the Somerset and Middlesex Counties and the interior boroughs of Bound Brook and Middlesex. When the bridge was being built in 1731, Bound Brook Borough was part of Bridgewater and Middlesex Borough remained part of Piscataway.

== Byways which crossed the bridge ==
Among the initial primary highways constructed in the state of New Jersey, the Camden Turnpike, the Amboy Turnpike and sectors of the modern Cranbury Road the first 3 primary highways in the state remained; the third member of this group comprised a sector of the modern River Road, which crossed the Old Stone Arch Bridge (though it was not a significant highway prior to the American Revolutionary War) as sectors of the highway separated northeast to modern Dunellen, turning west, continuing southwest to the point where it crossed the bridge and proceeding to the division point of the northern and southern branches of the river at Branchburg. From there the highway followed some existing roads southwest toward the Delaware River; further evidence that the highway was known by that name was provided in 1936 by Cornelius C. Vermeule in his Raritan Landing That Was, 1675–1875 (1936) which provided a road map he drew to recreate the route. These routes were accompanied at the time via the modern road known as State Route 27, south of Princeton, New Jersey, which originally extended to Salem. The portion designated the "Old Salem Road" crossed the bridge, though the route possesses several additional names, including the "Asapink Trail", "Upper Road", "Old Dutch Road" and the "Lincoln Highway". It was originally known as "Lawrie's Road" or "Lower Road"; the third highway constituted what is a portion of today's River Road, extending from Piscataway to Bound Brook.

As early as the late 17th century, starting in Cheltenham, Pennsylvania, a highway known as Old York Road began from Philadelphia to New Hope on the Delaware River across from one of the major ferries to New Jersey. The highway was conceived by a petition to Governor Charles Gookin and his council in 1691 by the Cheltenham settlers that asked for a road to be built between the Delaware River and Philadelphia, which resulted in a 1711 survey. From 1711 to 1772 it was constructed and ran from Central Philadelphia to Elizabethtown (now Elizabeth) Point. The main road still exists under different names, but a large portion still has that name in Pennsylvania and New Jersey from Lambertville to Hillsborough. It was formally accepted and authorized after a 1762 road survey conducted by Somerset County that ended with its eastern terminus in that county as "to middle of Bound Brook Stone Bridge".

As the shortest route from Philadelphia to New York City, Old York Road was selected by the Swift Sure Stagecoach line, a stagecoach company which was granted a franchise via the two states. It ran well into the middle of the 19th century until the development of efficient railroad lines. The Old Stage Inn on Front Street and Park Avenue in Scotch Plains, New Jersey, built in 1737, was one of the original taverns and stage coach stops, known as "ordinaries", where mail was dropped off and passengers could receive food, drink, additional perishables and rest for the duration of the night; it currently remains in business south of U.S 22, with a memorial marker on a small boulder next to a flagpole on Front Street just in front of the inn.

== Impact of the Raritan Landing ==
The Old Stone Arch Bridge was built to allow hunters, farmers, tradesmen and all other travelers between northwest New Jersey and west of it to cross the Green Brook.

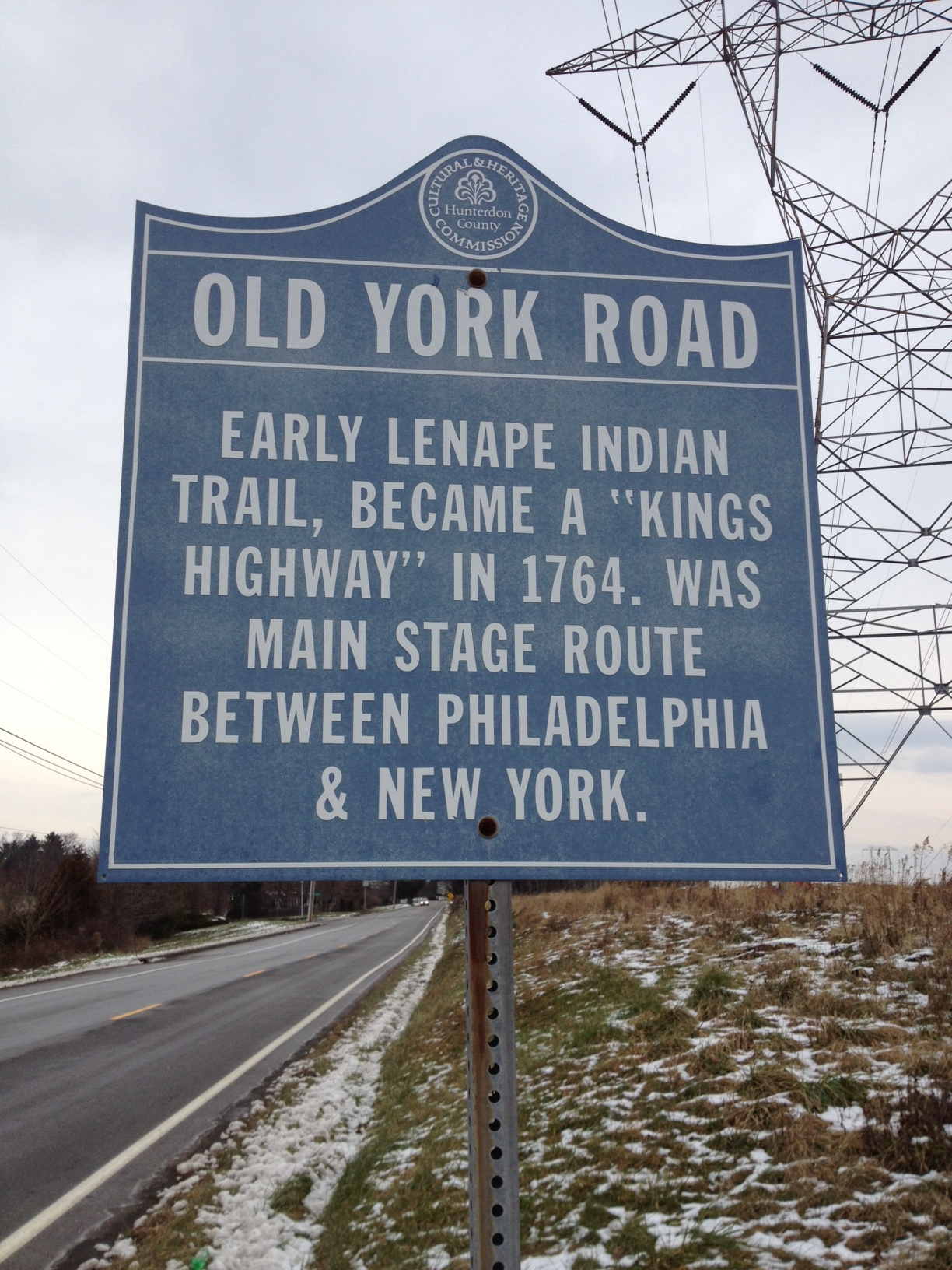
The old highway is memorialized in Hunterdon County, NJ

In the early 18th century, traveling along the northern bank of the Raritan westward from Somerset County required crossing the Green Brook, which merged into a confluence with the Raritan River from Middlesex County. Unlike many other rivers and waterway crossings in the colonies, and New Jersey in particular, there was no established ferry. It was impossible to cross the brook without taking an extremely long and time-consuming northern bypass, and particularly became a problem because of the emergence of the ports of New Brunswick and Raritan Landing across from each other on the river.

Raritan Landing emerged as a vital port community during the 1720s. It was situated at the farthest inland point on the Raritan River that could be navigated by merchant ships of the day. In its prime, the landing was the center for local trade and, along with New Brunswick, served as a hub for imports and exports to and from the Raritan Valley. By the 1740s, there were approximately 70 structures and more than 100 inhabitants. By the end of the Revolutionary War it had become insignificant after being ravished by the invading British armies and overshadowed by New Brunswick, where the river was deeper.

== Burial ==
The Old Stone Arch Bridge is obscurely located along what is no more than a rough road driveway to a warehouse occupied by trucking company.

The Somerset County Cultural and Heritage Commission, the Board of Chosen Freeholders in the county and their site coordinator, Thomas d'Amico, commissioned a feasibility study that included excavating portions of the structure that were buried in the early 1870s, when the second of three railroad lines passed via Bound Brook. They discovered the bridge, despite its burial for more than approximately 140 years; the portion of the brook it spanned, which flowed into the Raritan River approximately 100 yards to the south, was redirected to allow dry ground to form beneath the bridge.

== Rediscovery and proposed unearthing and preservation ==
The bridge remained significant for approximately 140 years prior to its burial until the early 1870s, when it was superseded as the premiere land route across the Green Brook by newly constructed railroads. However, the borough planned to memorialize it as the central point of what has been suggested to be the Old Stone Bridge Park by the borough. Its approximate date of construction remained uncertain, but recently discovered state records validated its approximate building date, with the provincial legislature authorizing the construction of a bridge within the area in 1727 and 1728: "There shall be a Bridge built over the Bound-Brook, in the most commodious place on the North-East-Side of the Road, as it now lies from Piscataway, in the County of Middlesex, up Raritan River". Construction of this bridge reportedly had not begun by 1730 when the legislature passed a supplementary act to clarify the intent of the earlier law regarding the Bound Brook bridge:

Whereas the Bridge to be built over Bound Brook... has hitherto met with Obstructions, arising from Mistakes concerning the Meaning and Intention of the said [1727/28] Act: ... That as soon as conveniently may be after the Publication of this Act, there shall be a Bridge built over the Bound Brook, on the most commodious Place on the North East Side of the Road now used, as it lies from Piscataway, in the County of Middlesex, up Raritan River, which Road, as the same is now [utilised], shall be deemed and taken for the Road or High-way and good and sufficient Causeways laid... one Third Part at the Expence [sic] of the County of Middlesex...The other two Third Parts thereof at the Expence [sic] of the County of Somerset.

No records have been discovered to prove exactly when the bridge was actually constructed, though all evidence points to 1731.

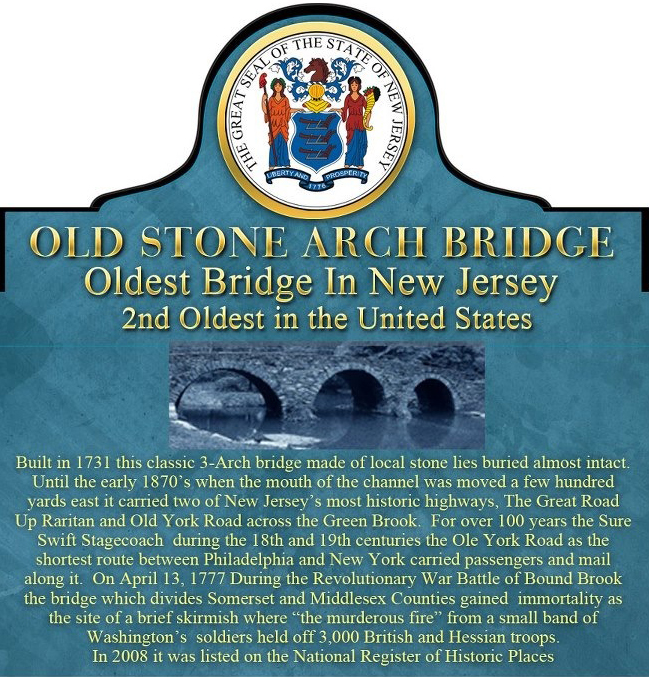

A legislative act of 1760 regulating roads and bridges clearly references this arrangement and states "two Stone Bridges and a Causeway have been built near the Mouth of Bound-Brook".

The second stone bridge referenced in the act was located at the eastern end of the causeway. This structure extended over the tail race for the neighboring gristmill; although the exact construction date of the gristmill is unknown, it is believed to predate the bridges and causeway. A 1766 map of Somerset County depicts the gristmill on the Raritan Road, upstream from the causeway, and attributes it to "Fields”. Michael Field, a miller and merchant in Bound Brook, was most likely the operator of the gristmill on Green Brook. Field did not then own the property, but the land had belonged to his family as early as the 1720s. The gristmill was likely built either during the tenure of Michael's father, Jeremiah (1729-1747), or his brother, also Jeremiah, prior to 1765.

Hunter Research was commissioned by the Army Corps of Engineers, which has been analyzing the problem and has attempted to resolve the borough's catastrophic historic flooding disasters, to write a brochure entitled "Saving Bound Brook. Where the Green Brook Meets The Raritan". It considered and proposed including the bridge, which was a “Warren-truss” iron bridge that was built in 1894. It replaced a wooden “kings post” crossing that replaced the second stone bridge only a decade before. The company speculated that the kings post bridge lasted for a short period of time because it was made from wood, which is not particularly sturdy. It also theorized that a larger, stronger structure was needed since a trolley service operated by the Brunswick Traction Company began on this route around the same time.

In 1932, with the construction of a larger, more modern bridge financed by both counties along East Main Street which became Lincoln Avenue at its eastern end in Middlesex Borough in Middlesex County, all road traffic was diverted to the bridge around the same time the trolleys went out of service. The Warren-truss bridge was considered a hazard and closed due to wear, probable flooding and what appears to be lack of proper maintenance, which ended the 301-year life of the original historic Philadelphia to New York City highway that crossed the bridge.

=== Role in the Revolutionary War ===
The Old Stone Arch Bridge that was listed on the National Register of Historic Places in 2008 as a national landmark mostly for its role in the American Revolutionary War. In 1777 a force of British soldiers marched in the darkness during the middle of the night from New Brunswick and surprised the smaller contingent of American troops and ragtag militia members in the Battle of Bound Brook. A British soldier's diary stated that they were held at bay due to "murderous fire" from their enemies who were positioned in a garrison near the bridge. This minor skirmish allegedly lasted no more than "eight to ten minutes" when the Americans abandoned their position as more British reinforcements appeared.

== Future ==
Hunter Research notes that if the cultural and heritage commissions and Somerset County and the Borough of Bound Bridge produce a conclusive decision in association with governing bodies within the region, the bridge (when it is unearthed and restored) and a Stone Bridge Park will be the highlight of a Raritan River Park that will extend the length of that county along the north banks of the river. The combined plans call for an ambitious greenway and park along the entirety of the northern banks of the river within the county and the Borough of Bound Brook Bridge will have its historic riverfront restored; this would require rerouting the southern railroad line and removing the embankment that has been a barrier between the riverfront and downtown Bound Brook for over 140 years.

== See also ==
- List of bridges on the National Register of Historic Places in New Jersey
