= Stone Sign Post Road Bridge over Plum Brook =

- U.S. National Register of Historic Places
- New Jersey Register of Historic Places
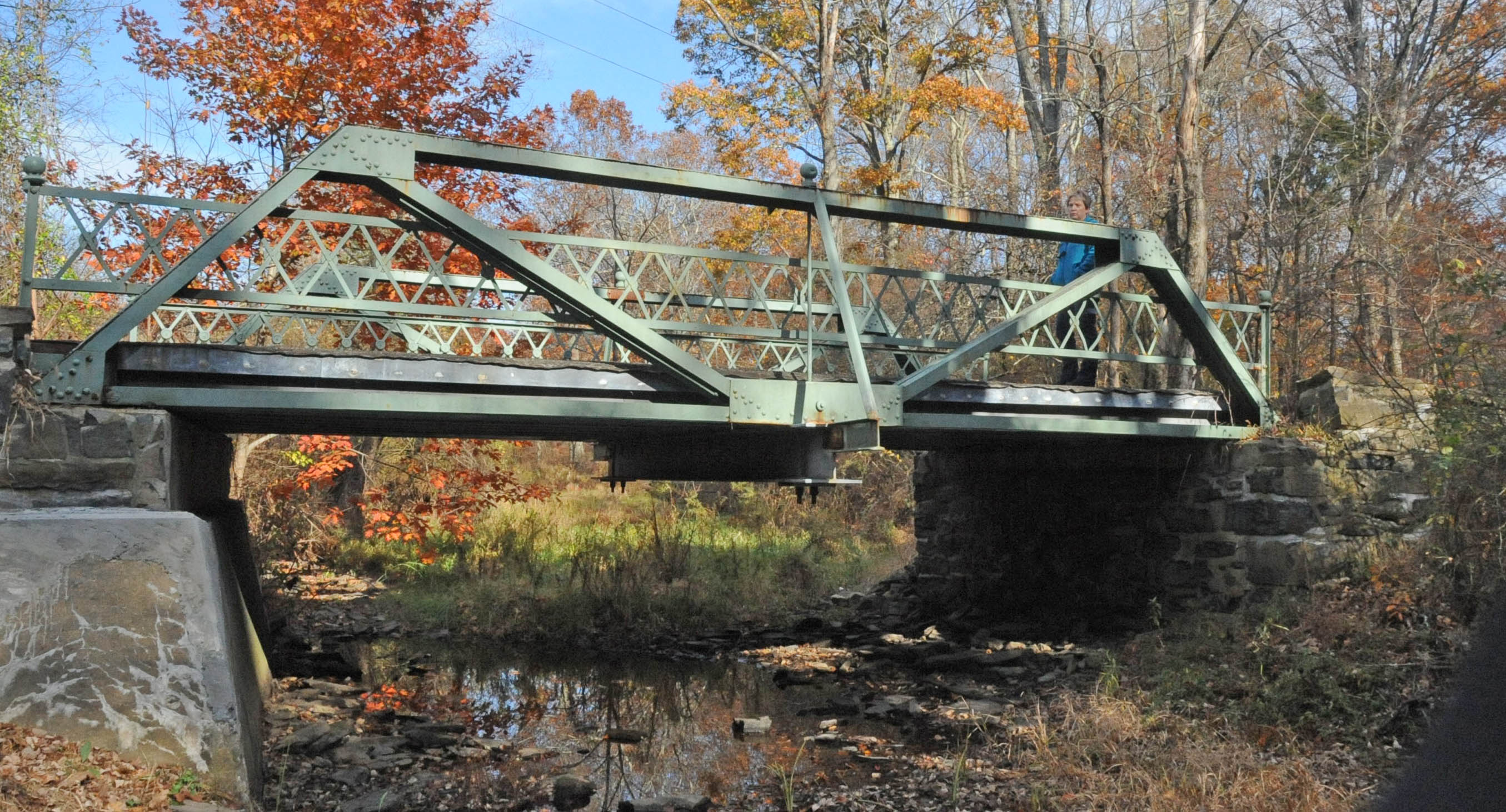

- Location within Hunterdon County, New Jersey Location within New Jersey Location within the United States
- Location: Stone Sign Post Road, Delaware Township, New Jersey
- Coordinates: 40°29′25.8″N 74°56′19.3″W
- Built: 1903
- Built by: John W. Scott
- MPS: Historic Bridges of Delaware Township, Hunterdon County, New Jersey MPDF
- NRHP reference No.: 16000692
- NJRHP No.: 3760

Significant dates
- Added to NRHP: October 4, 2016
- Designated NJRHP: August 3, 2016

The Stone Sign Post Road Bridge over Plum Brook is a historic Warren truss bridge located in Delaware Township in Hunterdon County, New Jersey, United States. Built in 1903 by John W. Scott of Flemington, it was added to the National Register of Historic Places on October 4, 2016, for its significance in engineering. It was listed as part of the Historic Bridges of Delaware Township, Hunterdon County, New Jersey Multiple Property Submission (MPS).

The 26 foot (7.9 m) long single-span bridge crosses Plum Brook, a tributary of the Wickecheoke Creek, which flows into the Delaware River at Prallsville. According to the nomination form, it is a distinct modification of a traditional Warren truss bridge. Scott also built the nearby Peck's Ferry Bridge, which also crosses Plum Brook.

== See also ==
- National Register of Historic Places listings in Hunterdon County, New Jersey
- List of bridges on the National Register of Historic Places in New Jersey
