= Raven Rock Road Bridge =

- U.S. National Register of Historic Places
- New Jersey Register of Historic Places
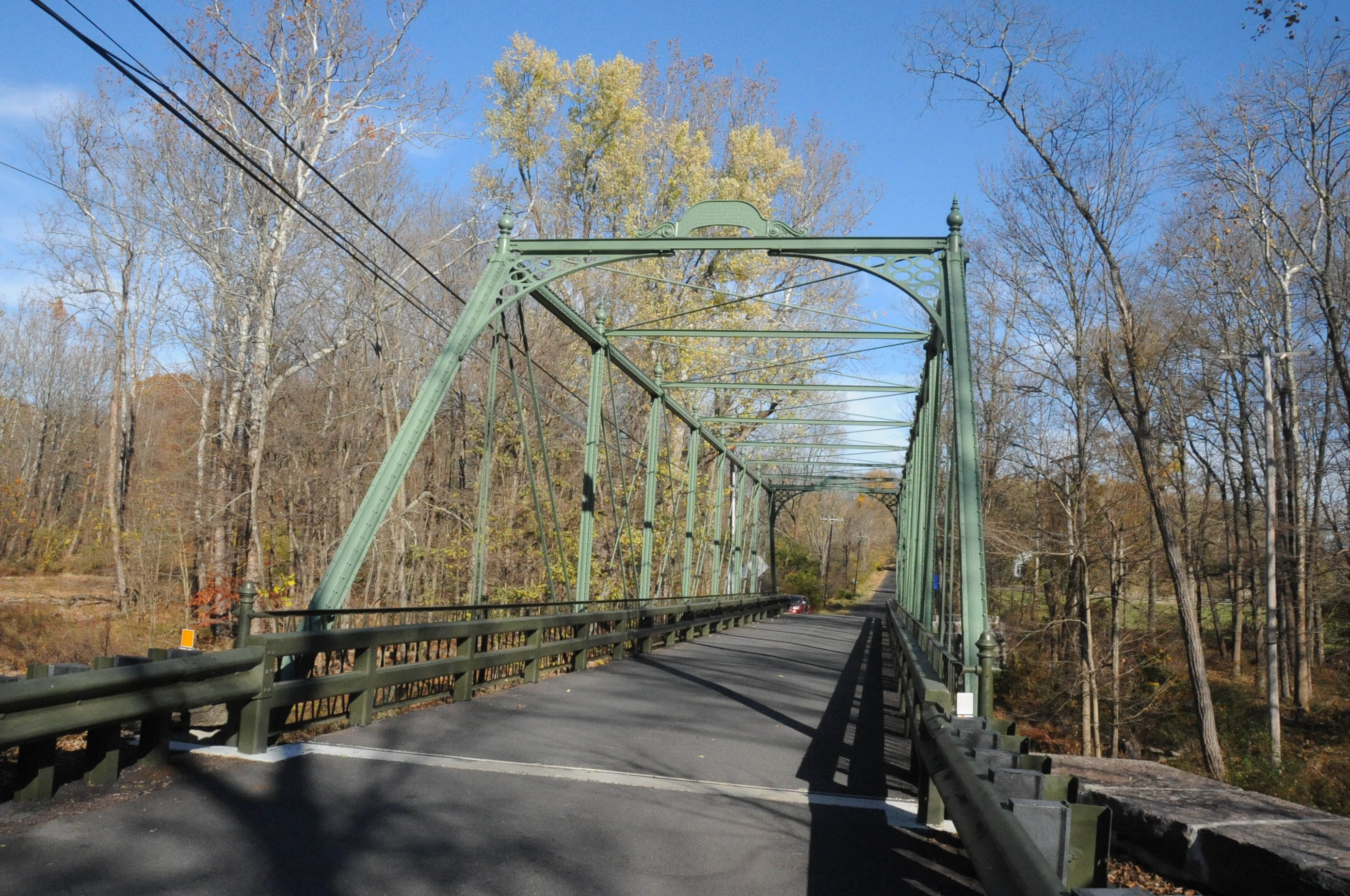

- Location within Hunterdon County, New Jersey Location within New Jersey Location within the United States
- Location: Rosemont-Raven Rock Road over Lockatong Creek, Raven Rock, New Jersey
- Coordinates: 40°24′58.5″N 75°01′03.2″W
- Built: 1878
- Built by: Lambertville Iron Works
- MPS: Historic Bridges of Delaware Township, Hunterdon County, New Jersey MPDF
- NRHP reference No.: 16000691
- NJRHP No.: 3470

Significant dates
- Added to NRHP: October 4, 2016
- Designated NJRHP: July 28, 2016

The Raven Rock Road Bridge is a historic Pratt thru truss bridge that carries Rosemont-Raven Rock Road over Lockatong Creek in the Raven Rock section of Delaware Township in Hunterdon County, New Jersey, United States. Built in 1878 by the Lambertville Iron Works, it was added to the National Register of Historic Places on October 4, 2016, for its significance in engineering and transportation. It was listed as part of the Historic Bridges of Delaware Township, Hunterdon County, New Jersey Multiple Property Submission (MPS).

The 129 foot (39 m) long single-span bridge was constructed with cast and wrought iron. It features the use of patented Phoenix Iron Company round riveted columns. According to the nomination form, it is the earliest use of this technology on state highways.

== See also ==
- National Register of Historic Places listings in Hunterdon County, New Jersey
- List of bridges on the National Register of Historic Places in New Jersey
