= Fairmount–Pottersville Road stone arch bridge over Hollow Brook =

- U.S. National Register of Historic Places
- New Jersey Register of Historic Places
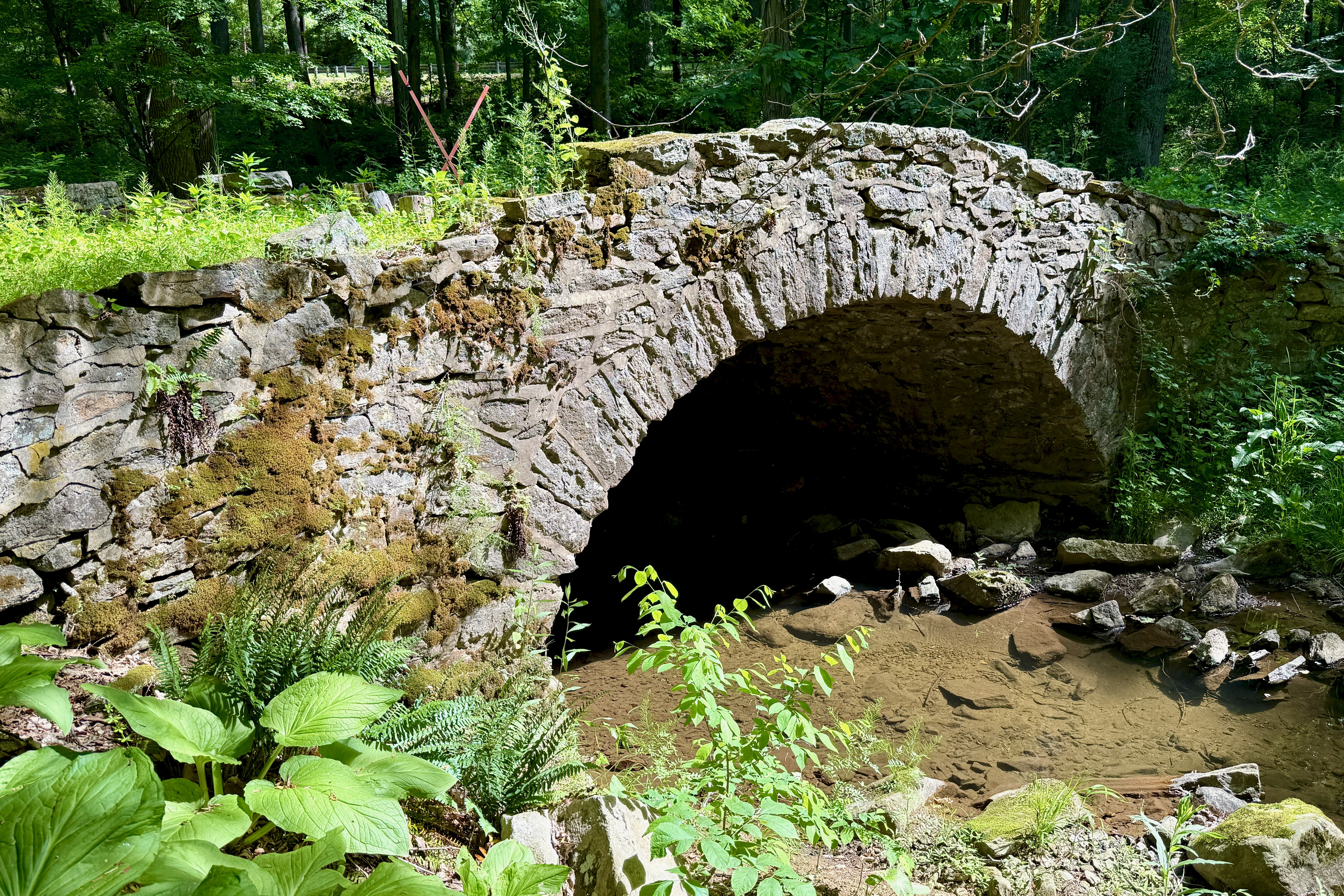
- Stone arch bridge in 2026

- Location within Hunterdon County, New Jersey Location within New Jersey Location within the United States
- Location: Abandoned, former alignment of Fairmount–Pottersville Road within the boundaries of the Tewksbury Land Trust, Tewksbury Township, New Jersey
- Coordinates: 40°43′28.7″N 74°45′16.0″W
- Built: c. 1875–1899
- MPS: Historic Bridges of Tewksbury Township MPDF
- NRHP reference No.: 100013039
- NJRHP No.: 5928

Significant dates
- Added to NRHP: May 21, 2026
- Designated NJRHP: April 2, 2026

The Fairmount–Pottersville Road stone arch bridge over Hollow Brook is a historic bridge on the former alignment of the Fairmount–Pottersville Road in Tewksbury Township, New Jersey. The stone arch bridge crosses the Hollow Brook, a tributary of the Lamington River, and was built in the last quarter of the 19th century. It was added to the National Register of Historic Places on May 21, 2026, for its significance in engineering. It was listed as part of the Historic Bridges of Tewksbury Township, Hunterdon County, New Jersey Multiple Property Submission (MPS).

== History and description ==
According to the nomination form, the skewed, single-span stone arch bridge dates from 1875 to 1899. It was constructed using local granite and gneiss to carry the now abandoned Fairmount–Pottersville Road over the Hollow Brook in a rural section of Tewksbury Township. The Hollow Brook was once known as Upper Cold Brook. The bridge is about 40 feet (12 m) long, about 20 feet (6.1 m) wide, and has an 18° skew. The road and bridge were abandoned in 1930 and have not been used by vehicles since then. The bridge is located in the former Pottersville Reservoir area, now the Hollow Brook Preserve, owned by the Tewksbury Land Trust.

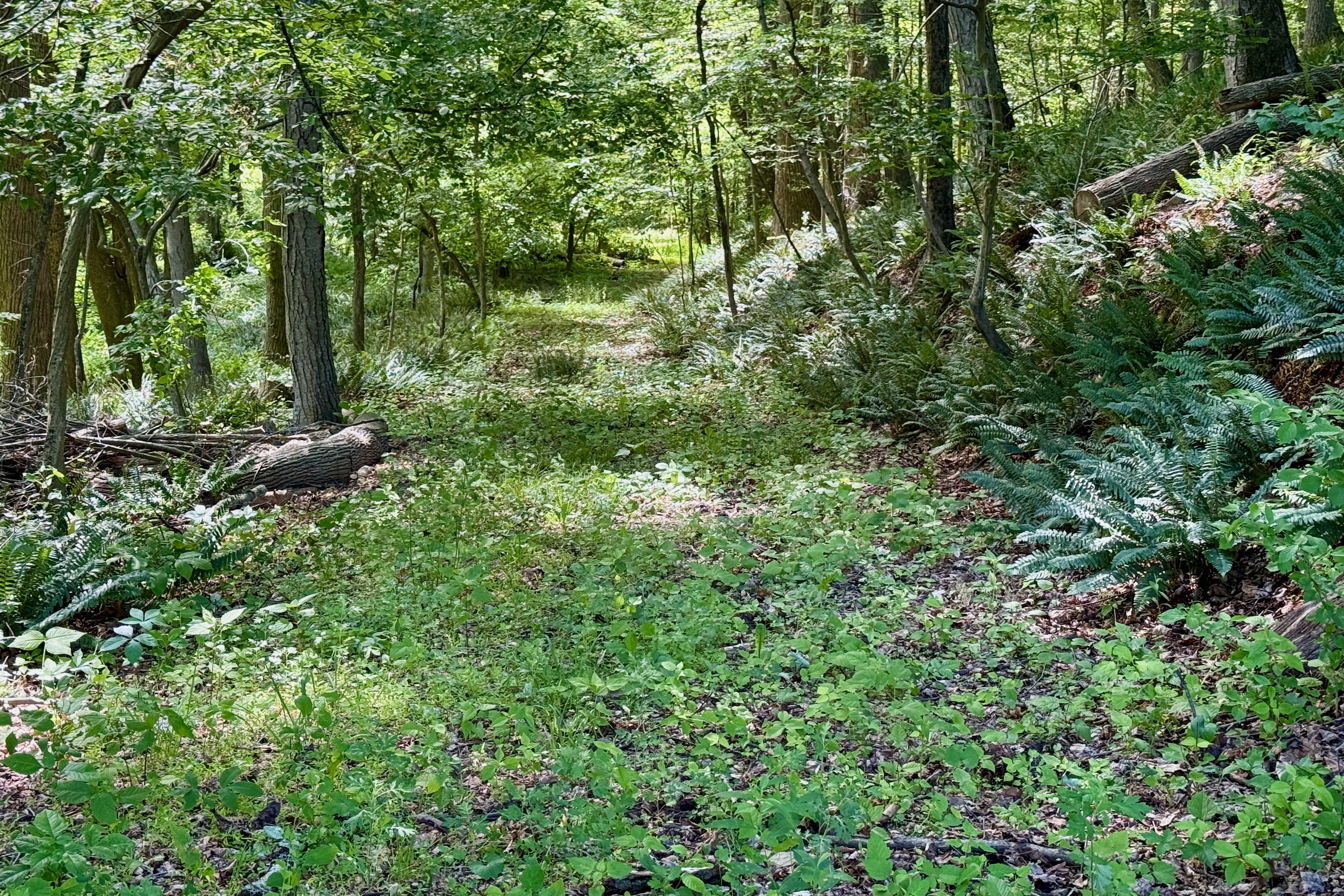
Abandoned Fairmount–Pottersville Road leading to stone arch bridge

== See also ==
- National Register of Historic Places listings in Hunterdon County, New Jersey
- List of bridges on the National Register of Historic Places in New Jersey
