= Penwell, New Jersey =

Populated place in Hunterdon County, New Jersey, US

- Unincorporated community
- Location of Penwell in Hunterdon County Inset: Location of county within the state of New Jersey Penwell, New Jersey (New Jersey) Penwell, New Jersey (the United States)
- Coordinates: 40°46′41″N 74°54′09″W
- Country: United States
- State: New Jersey
- County: Hunterdon
- Township: Lebanon
- Named for: Penn Well Mills
- Elevation: 413 ft (126 m)
- GNIS feature ID: 879227

Penwell is an unincorporated community located within Lebanon Township in Hunterdon County, in the U.S. state of New Jersey.

Penwell is a community in the north of Lebanon Township that was also most northern settlement in Hunterdon County. It was known as Penwell dating back to 1866 and was named after the Penn Well Mills on the Musconetcong River. When the property of Sylvanus Hoffman was advertised for sale in 1886, the village was described as being on the Washington Turnpike (now Route 57) and his land "along a stream".

The Miller Farmstead, nearby, is listed on the National Register of Historic Places, and includes a historic stone arch bridge over the Musconetcong River.
