= Neshanic River =

River central New Jersey in the United States

Location
- Country: United States
- State: New Jersey
- County: Hunterdon County, Somerset County

Physical characteristics
- Source
  - location: Raritan Township
  - coordinates: 40°28′47″N 74°51′29″W
- Mouth: South Branch Raritan River
  - location: Hillsborough Township

Basin features
- River system: Raritan River
- GNIS feature ID: 878714

The Neshanic River is a tributary of the South Branch Raritan River in central New Jersey in the United States. It is 11 miles long.

== Tributaries ==
- First Neshanic River
- Second Neshanic River
- Third Neshanic River

== See also ==
- List of rivers of New Jersey
