= New Hampton Pony Pratt Truss Bridge =

- U.S. National Register of Historic Places
- U.S. Historic district – Contributing property
- New Jersey Register of Historic Places
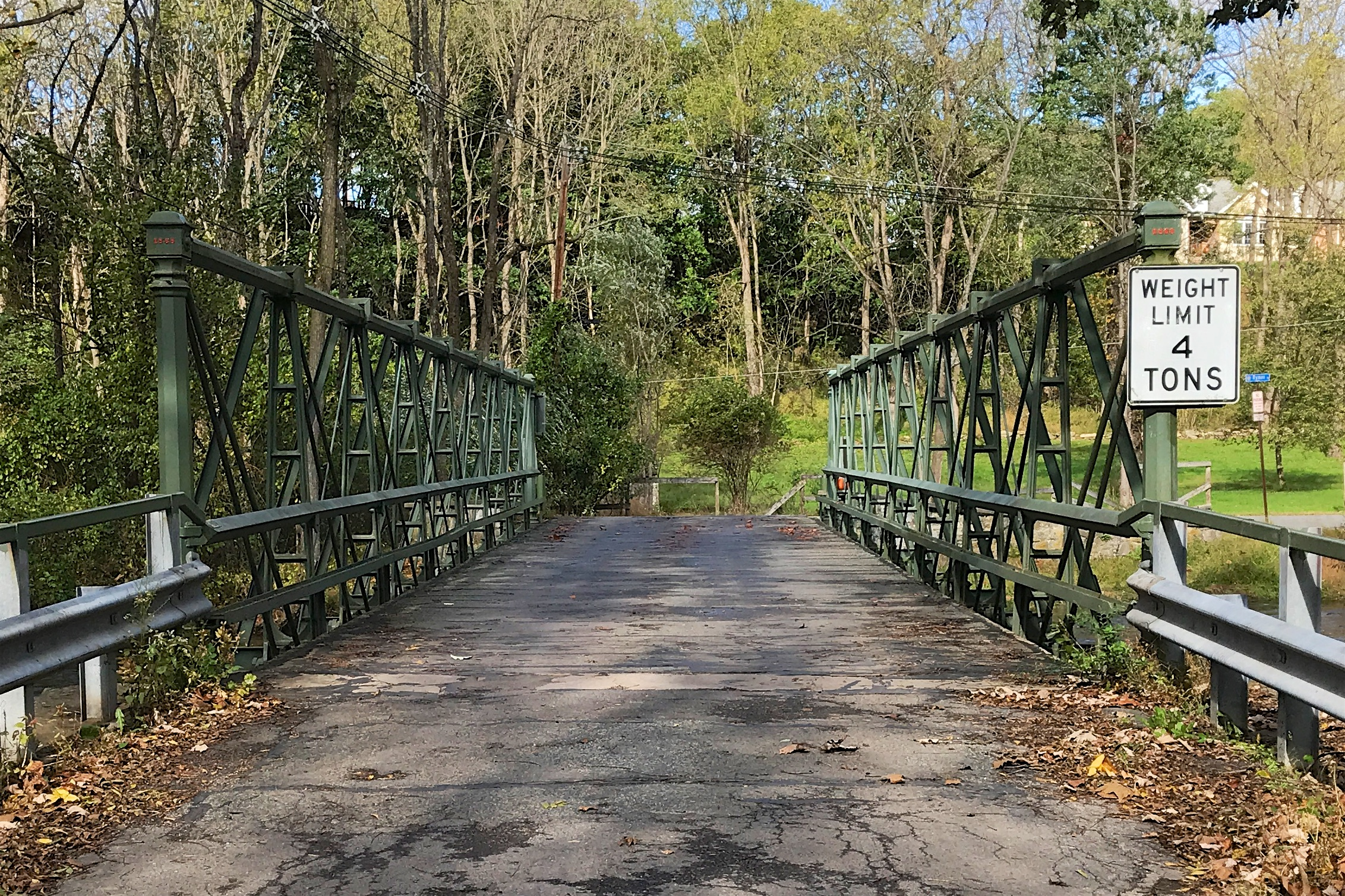
- New Hampton Bridge over the Musconetcong River

- Location within Hunterdon County, New Jersey Location within Warren County, New Jersey Location within New Jersey Location within the United States
- Location: Shoddy Mill Road; New Hampton, New Jersey
- Coordinates: 40°43′14″N 74°57′49″W
- Built: 1868
- Built by: William Cowin
- Architect: Francis C. Lowthorp
- Architectural style: Pratt truss
- Part of: New Hampton Historic District (ID98000257)
- NRHP reference No.: 77000877
- NJRHP No.: 1610

Significant dates
- Added to NRHP: July 26, 1977
- Designated CP: April 6, 1998
- Designated NJRHP: September 13, 1976

The New Hampton Pony Pratt Truss Bridge is a historic pony Pratt truss bridge on Shoddy Mill Road in New Hampton of Lebanon Township, Hunterdon County, New Jersey. It crosses the Musconetcong River between Lebanon Township, Hunterdon County and Washington Township, Warren County. It was designed by Francis C. Lowthorp and built in 1868 by William Cowin of Lambertville, New Jersey. The bridge was added to the National Register of Historic Places on July 26, 1977 for its significance in engineering, industry and transportation. It is one of the few early examples of iron Pratt truss bridges remaining in the United States. It was later documented by the Historic American Engineering Record in 1991. It was added as a contributing property to the New Hampton Historic District on April 6, 1998.

== Description ==
The New Hampton bridge is one of three remaining composite cast iron and wrought iron Pratt truss bridges built by Cowin in New Jersey. The others are the Glen Gardner Pony Pratt Truss Bridge (1870) in Glen Gardner and the Main Street Bridge (1870) in Clinton. The single-span bridge is 85 feet (26 m) long and 16.2 feet (4.9 m) wide. Its end posts are vertical, octagonal iron tubes topped square decorative caps.

== Gallery ==
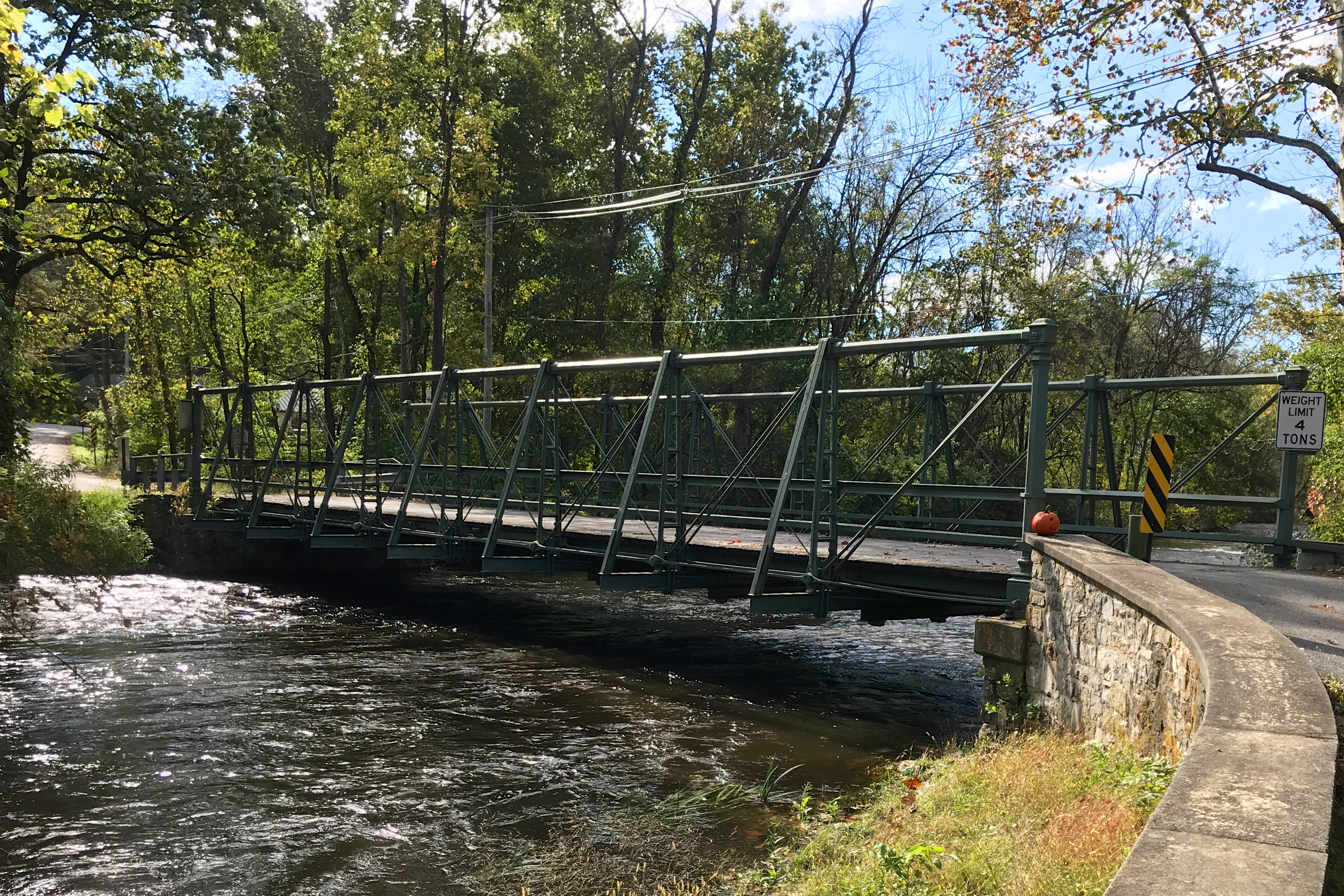
View from Rymon Road, Washington Township, Warren County

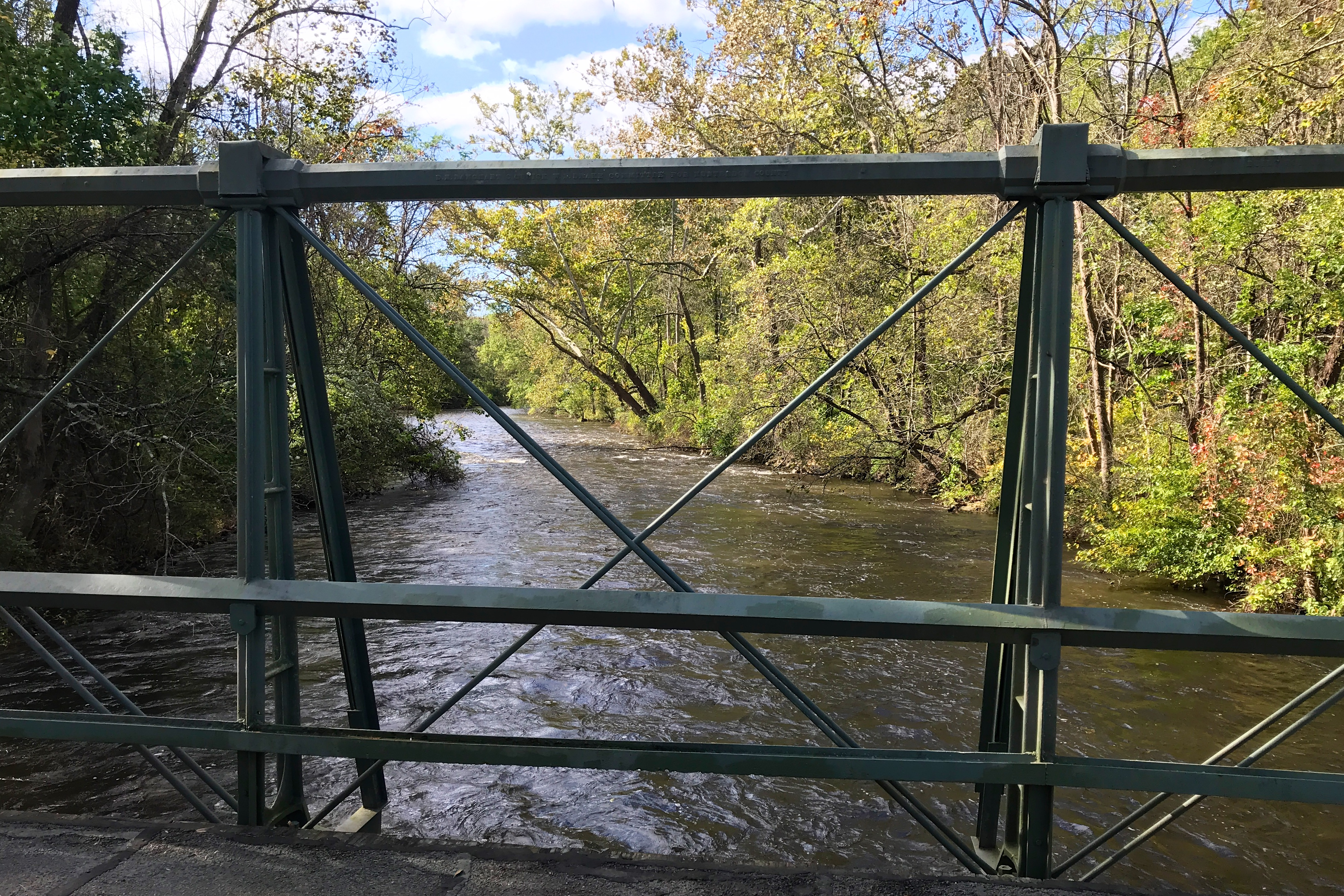
Crossing the Musconetcong River

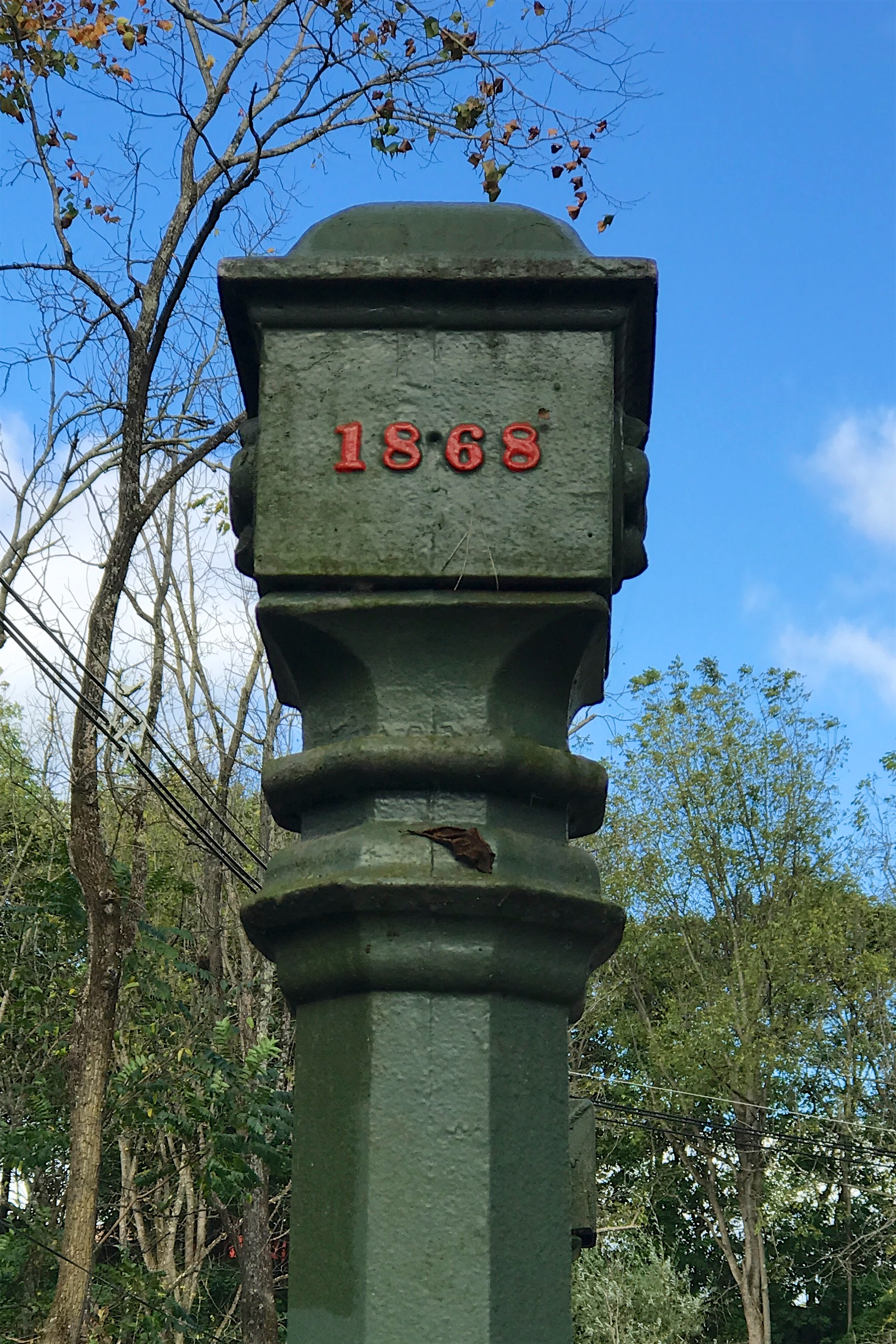
End post detail

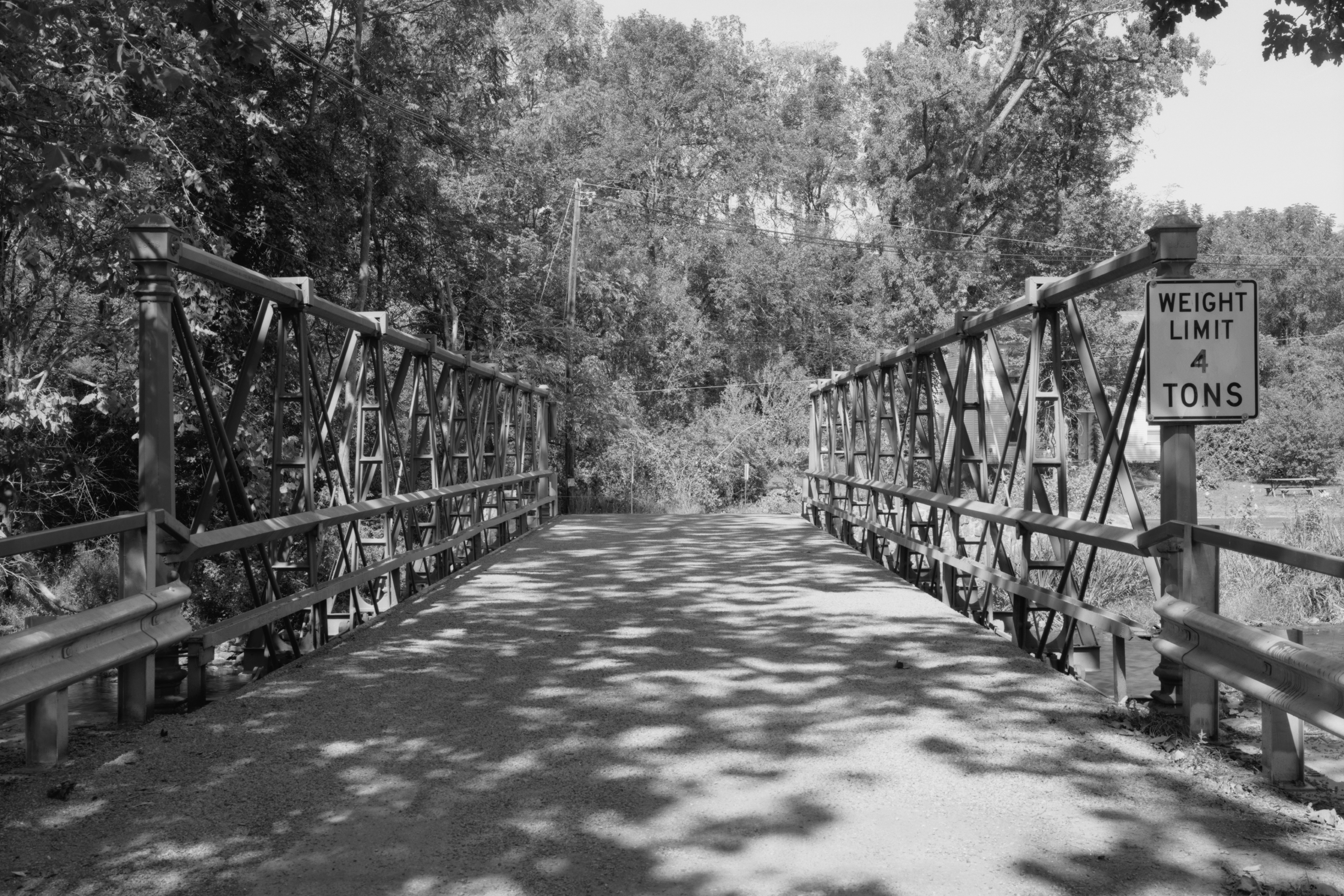
HAER view in 1991

== See also ==
- National Register of Historic Places listings in Hunterdon County, New Jersey
- National Register of Historic Places listings in Warren County, New Jersey
- List of bridges documented by the Historic American Engineering Record in New Jersey
- List of bridges on the National Register of Historic Places in New Jersey
