= Senator Elkins =

Senator Elkins may refer to:

- Davis Elkins (1876–1959), U.S. Senator from West Virginia.
- Luther Elkins (1809–1887), Oregon State Senate
- Stephen Benton Elkins (1841–1911), U.S. Senator from West Virginia
