= Main Street Bridge (Clinton, New Jersey) =

- U.S. Historic district – Contributing property
- New Jersey Register of Historic Places
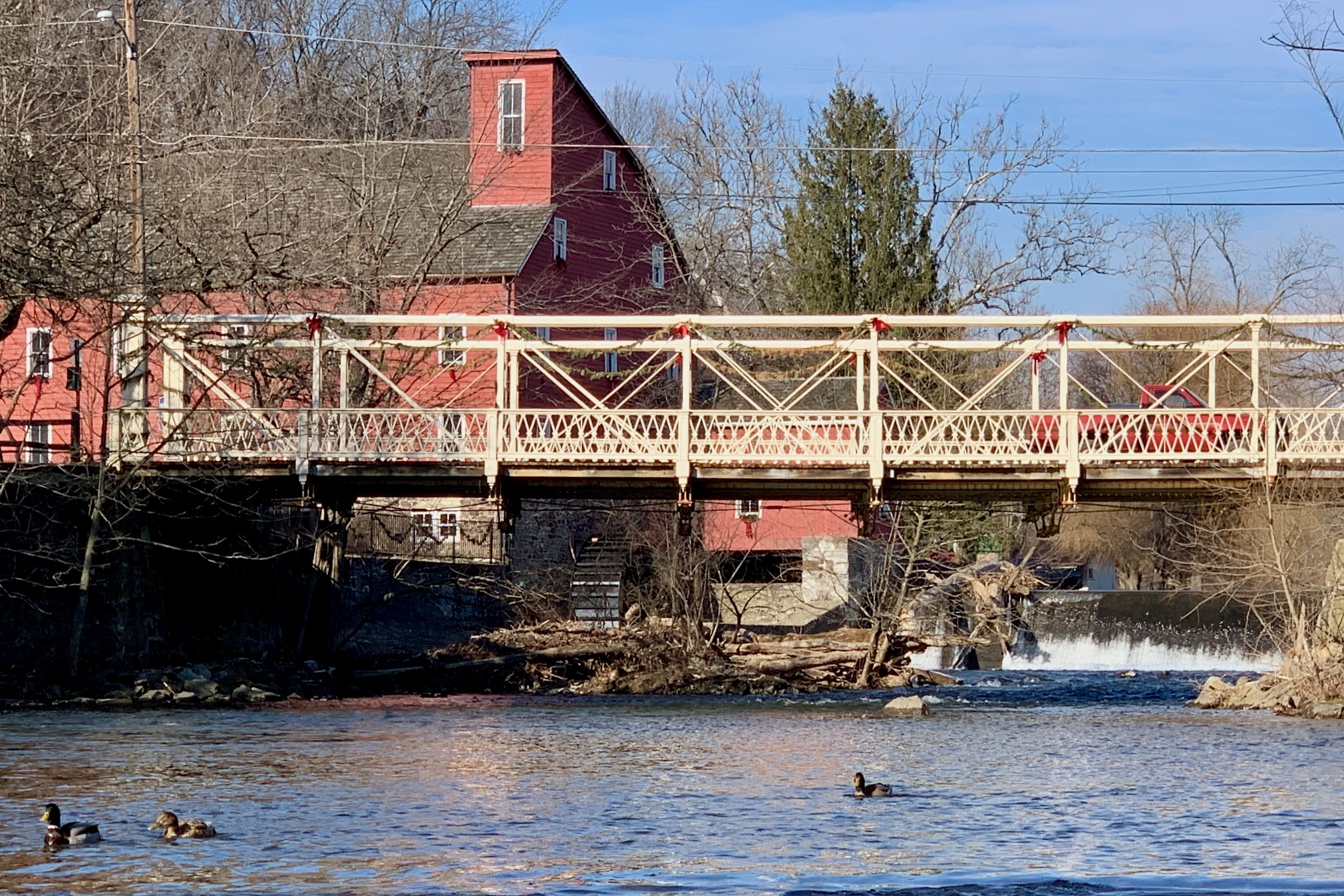
- Main Street Bridge by the Red Mill

- Location within Hunterdon County, New Jersey Location within New Jersey Location within the United States
- Location: Main Street, Clinton, New Jersey
- Coordinates: 40°38′9.5″N 74°54′43.5″W
- Built: 1870
- Built by: William Cowin
- Architect: Francis C. Lowthorp
- Architectural style: Pratt truss
- Part of: Clinton Historic District (ID95001101)
- NJRHP No.: 328

Significant dates
- Designated CP: September 28, 1995
- Designated NJRHP: February 11, 1999

The Main Street Bridge, once known as the West Main Street Bridge, is a historic pony Pratt truss bridge crossing the South Branch Raritan River in Clinton of Hunterdon County, New Jersey. It was designed by Francis C. Lowthorp and built in 1870 by William Cowin of Lambertville. The bridge was added to the National Register of Historic Places on September 28, 1995 as part of the Clinton Historic District. It is one of the few early examples of iron Pratt truss bridges remaining in the United States. It was documented by the Historic American Engineering Record in 1991.

== Description ==
The Main Street bridge is one of three remaining composite cast iron and wrought iron Pratt truss bridges built by Cowin in New Jersey. The others are the New Hampton Pony Pratt Truss Bridge (1868) in New Hampton and the Glen Gardner Pony Pratt Truss Bridge (1870) in Glen Gardner. The two-span bridge is 170 feet (52 m) long and 15.6 feet (4.8 m) wide. It features Italianate style end posts and decorative cast-iron guard rails for the pedestrian walkways.

== Gallery ==
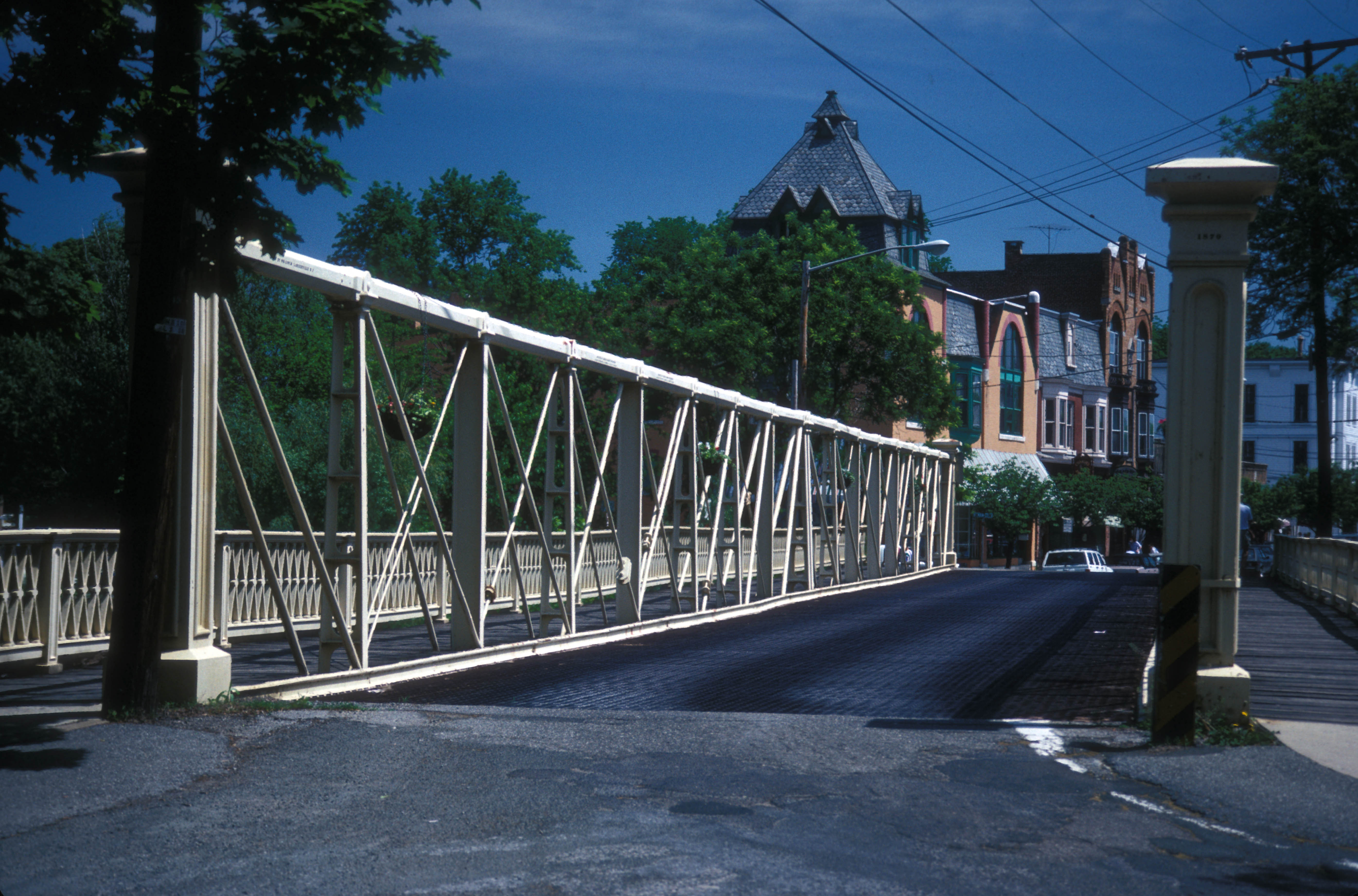
Italianate style end posts

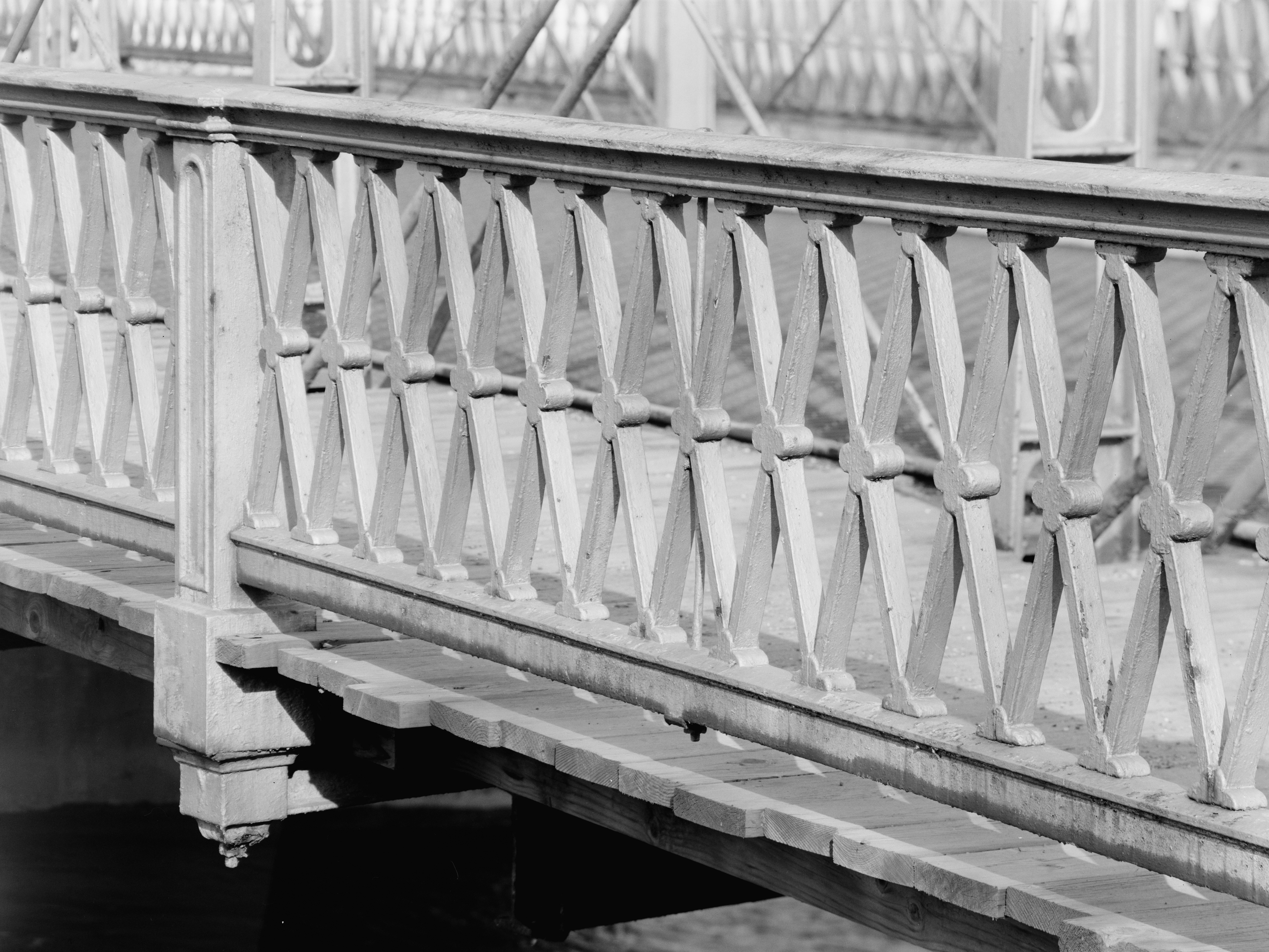
Railing detail

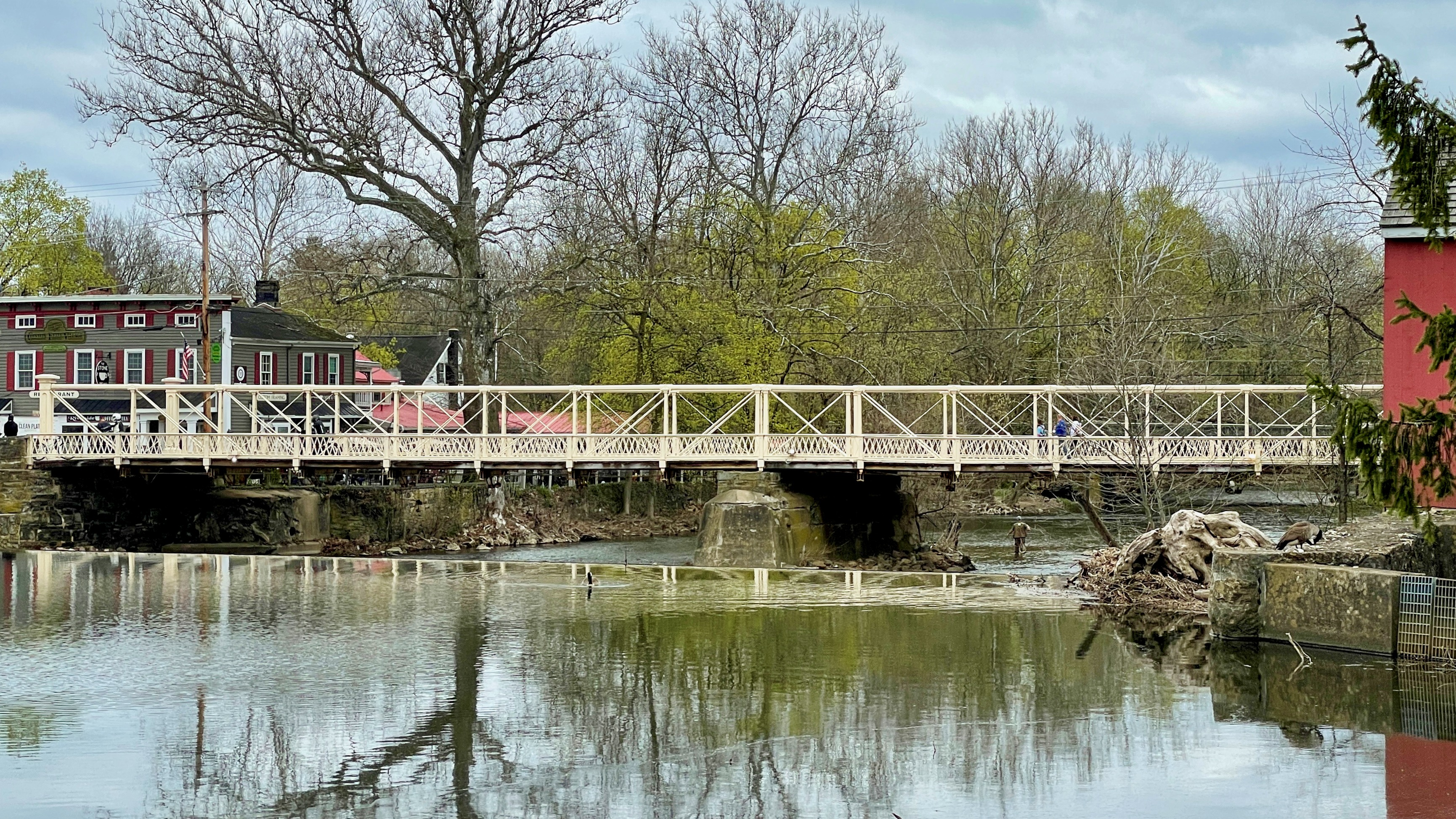
Looking southeast from the Red Mill

== See also ==
- National Register of Historic Places listings in Hunterdon County, New Jersey
- List of bridges documented by the Historic American Engineering Record in New Jersey
- List of bridges on the National Register of Historic Places in New Jersey
- List of crossings of the Raritan River
