= Glen Gardner Pony Pratt Truss Bridge =

- U.S. National Register of Historic Places
- New Jersey Register of Historic Places
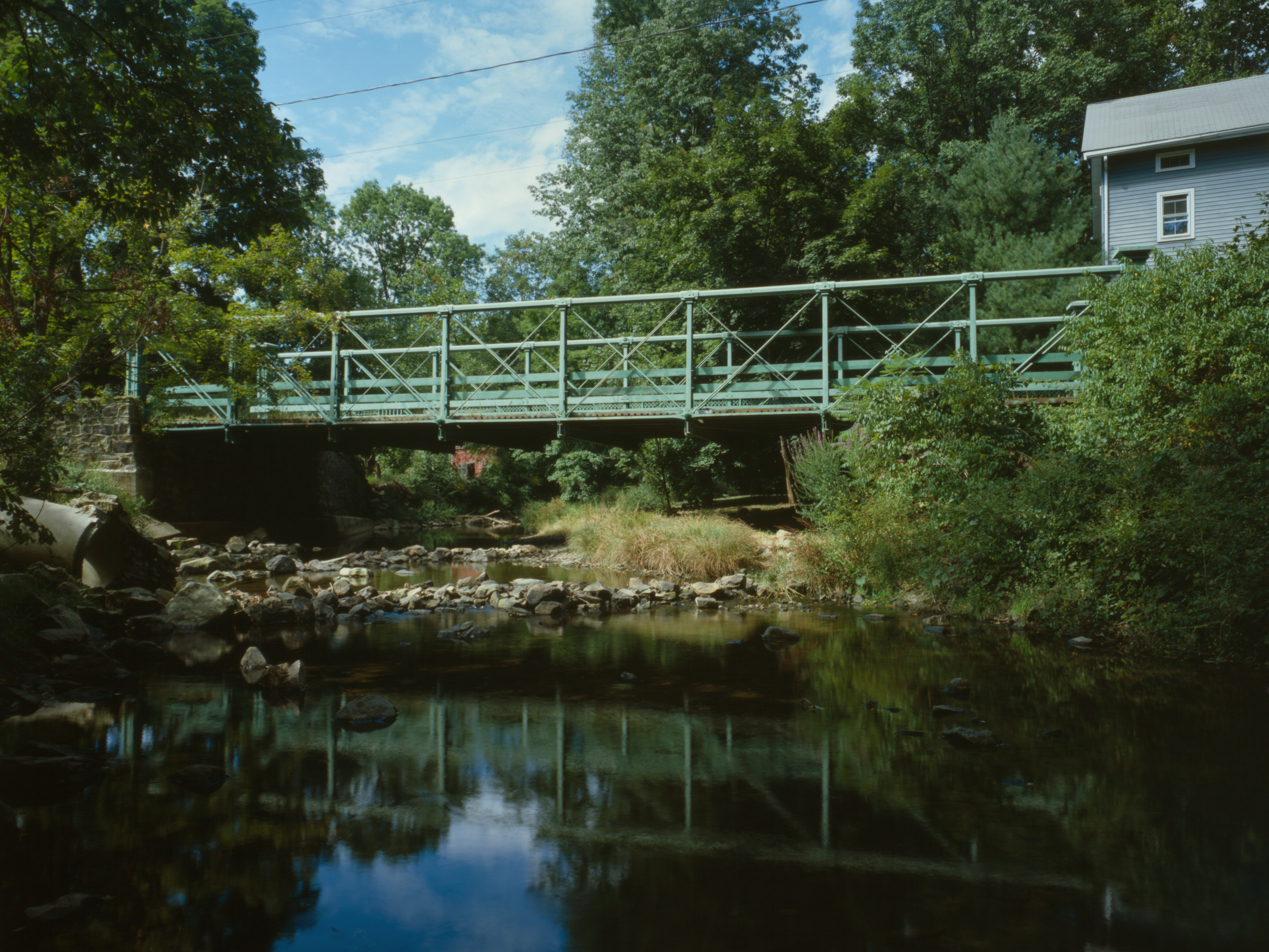
- Glen Gardner Bridge in 1991

- Location within Hunterdon County, New Jersey Location within New Jersey Location within the United States
- Location: School Street (Mill Street) over Spruce Run; Glen Gardner, New Jersey
- Coordinates: 40°42′04.5″N 74°56′36.5″W
- Built: 1870
- Built by: William Cowin
- Architect: Francis C. Lowthorp
- Architectural style: Pratt truss
- NRHP reference No.: 77000876
- NJRHP No.: 1592

Significant dates
- Added to NRHP: September 22, 1977
- Designated NJRHP: August 5, 1976

The Glen Gardner Pony Pratt Truss Bridge is a historic pony Pratt truss bridge on School Street (formerly Mill Street) crossing the Spruce Run in Glen Gardner of Hunterdon County, New Jersey. It was designed by Francis C. Lowthorp and built in 1870 by William Cowin of Lambertville, New Jersey. The bridge was added to the National Register of Historic Places on September 22, 1977 for its significance in engineering, industry and transportation. It is one of the few early examples of iron Pratt truss bridges remaining in the United States. It was later documented by the Historic American Engineering Record in 1991.

== Description ==
The Glen Gardner bridge is one of three remaining composite cast iron and wrought iron Pratt truss bridges built by Cowin in New Jersey. The others are the New Hampton Pony Pratt Truss Bridge (1868) in New Hampton and the Main Street Bridge (1870) in Clinton. The single-span bridge is 84 feet (26 m) long and 16.6 feet (5.1 m) wide. It features a pedestrian walkway with a decorative cast-iron railing.

== Gallery ==
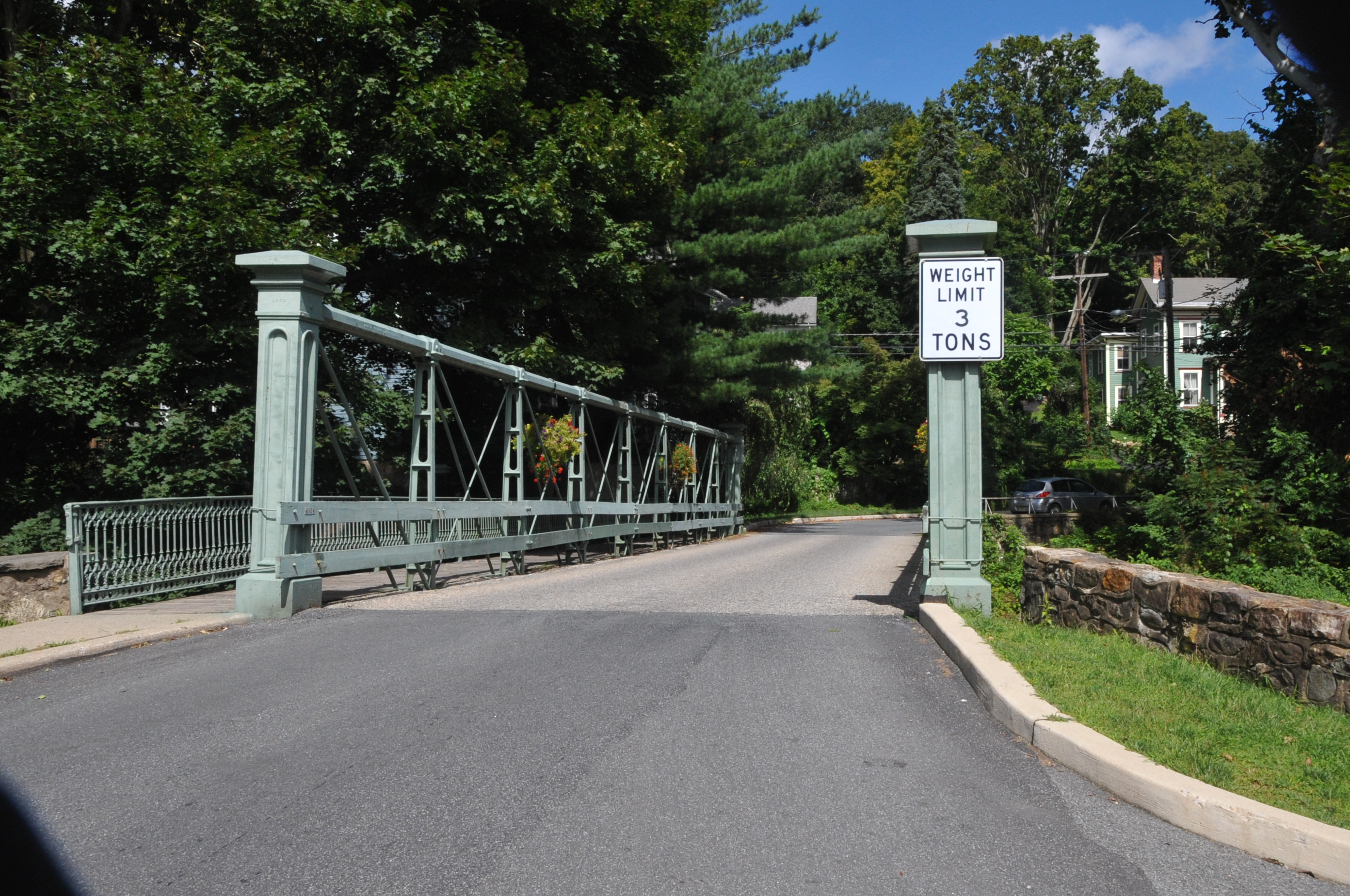
View looking east

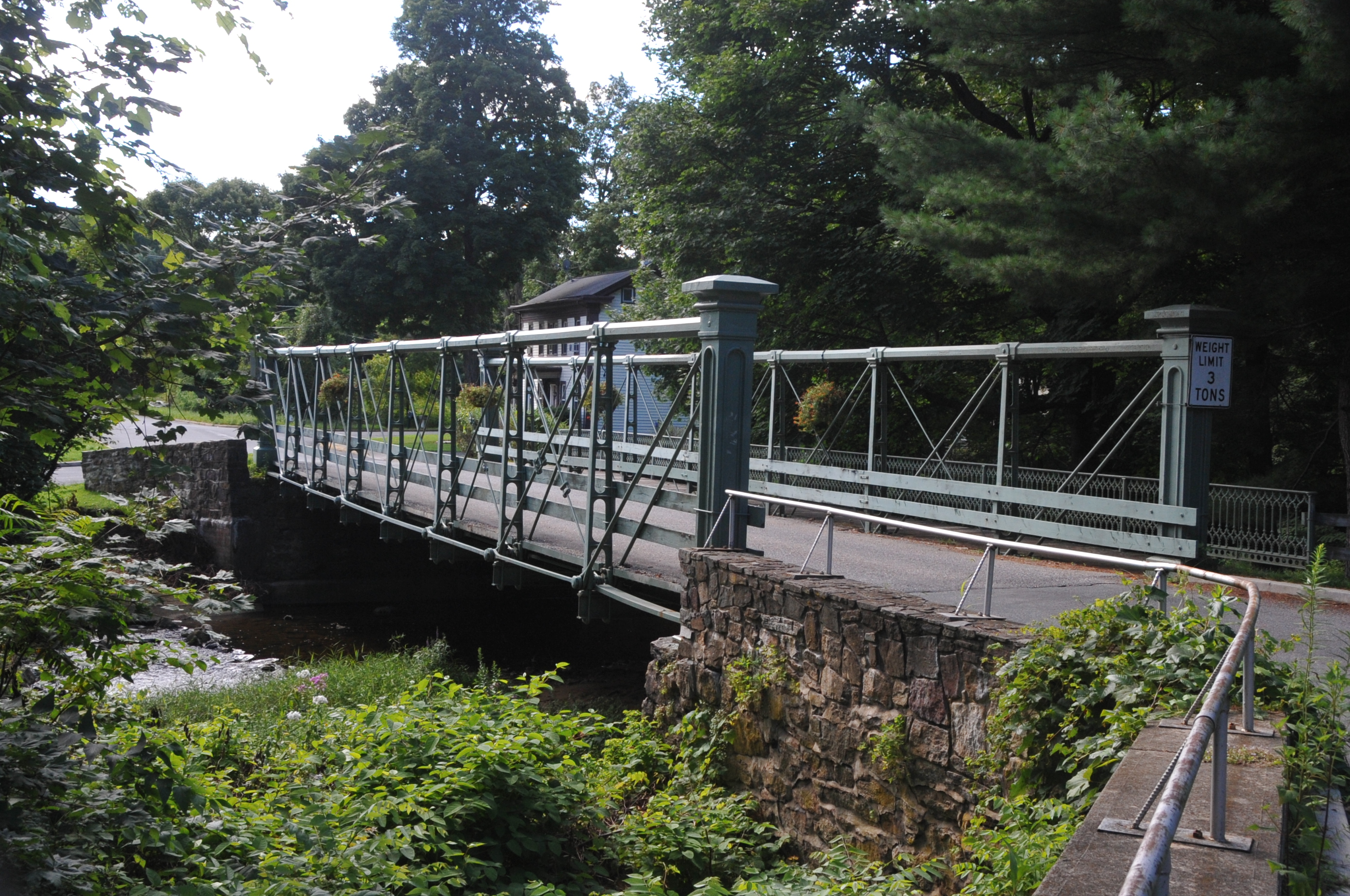
View looking west

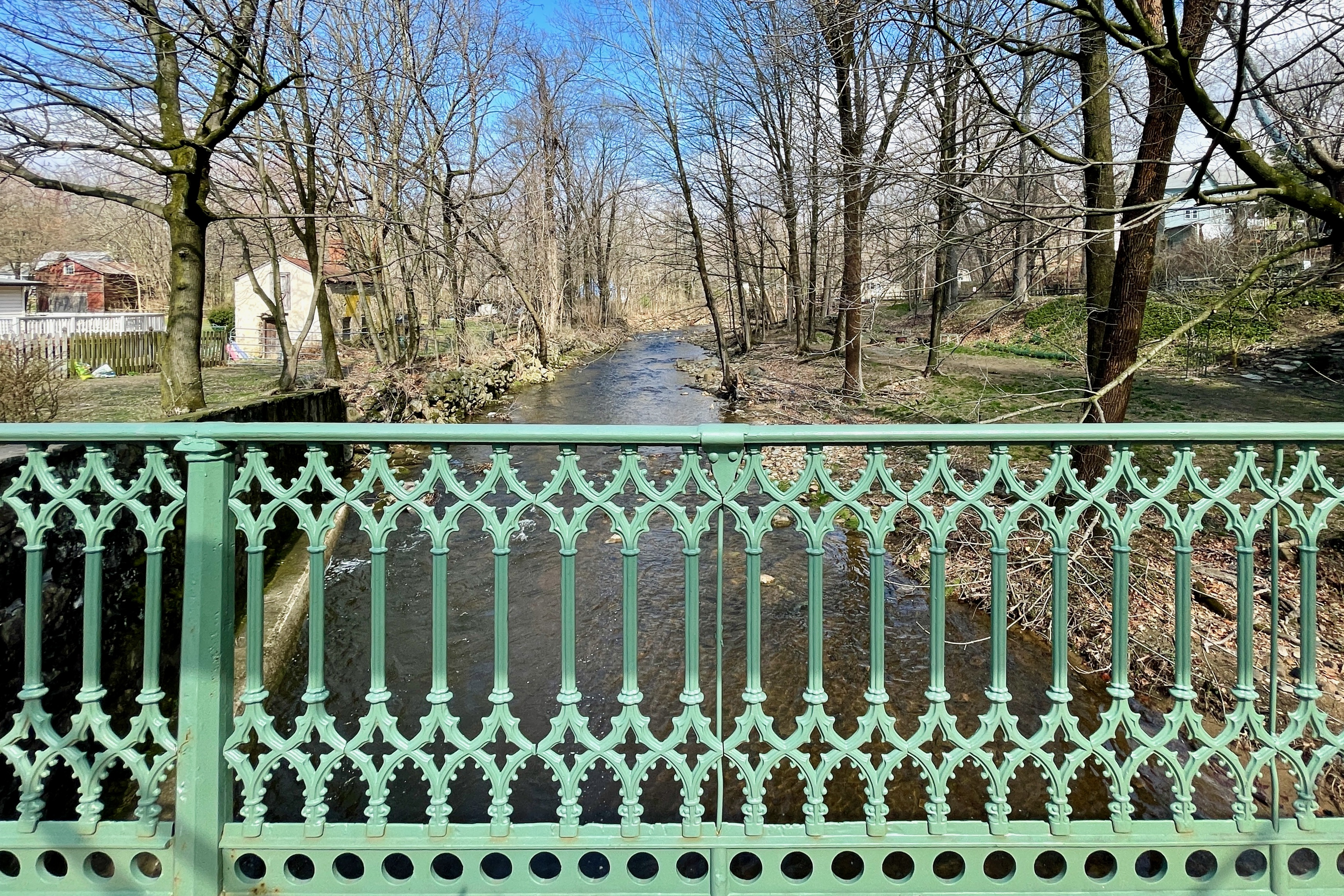
Railing detail, looking north

== See also ==
- National Register of Historic Places listings in Hunterdon County, New Jersey
- List of bridges documented by the Historic American Engineering Record in New Jersey
- List of bridges on the National Register of Historic Places in New Jersey
