= Anthony, New Jersey =

Populated place in Hunterdon County, New Jersey, US

- Unincorporated community
- Location in Hunterdon County Location in New Jersey Location in the United States
- Coordinates: 40°44′54″N 74°52′53″W
- Country: United States
- State: New Jersey
- County: Hunterdon
- Township: Lebanon
- Elevation: 797 ft (243 m)
- GNIS feature ID: 874357

Anthony is an unincorporated community located within Lebanon Township in Hunterdon County, in the U.S. state of New Jersey.

== History ==
In the late 18th century, Anthony had a school located within the home of its teacher, John Forrester.

Anthony had a post office by 1879.

In 1882, Anthony had a population of 98.
