= Bunnvale, New Jersey =

Populated place in Hunterdon County, New Jersey, US

- Unincorporated community
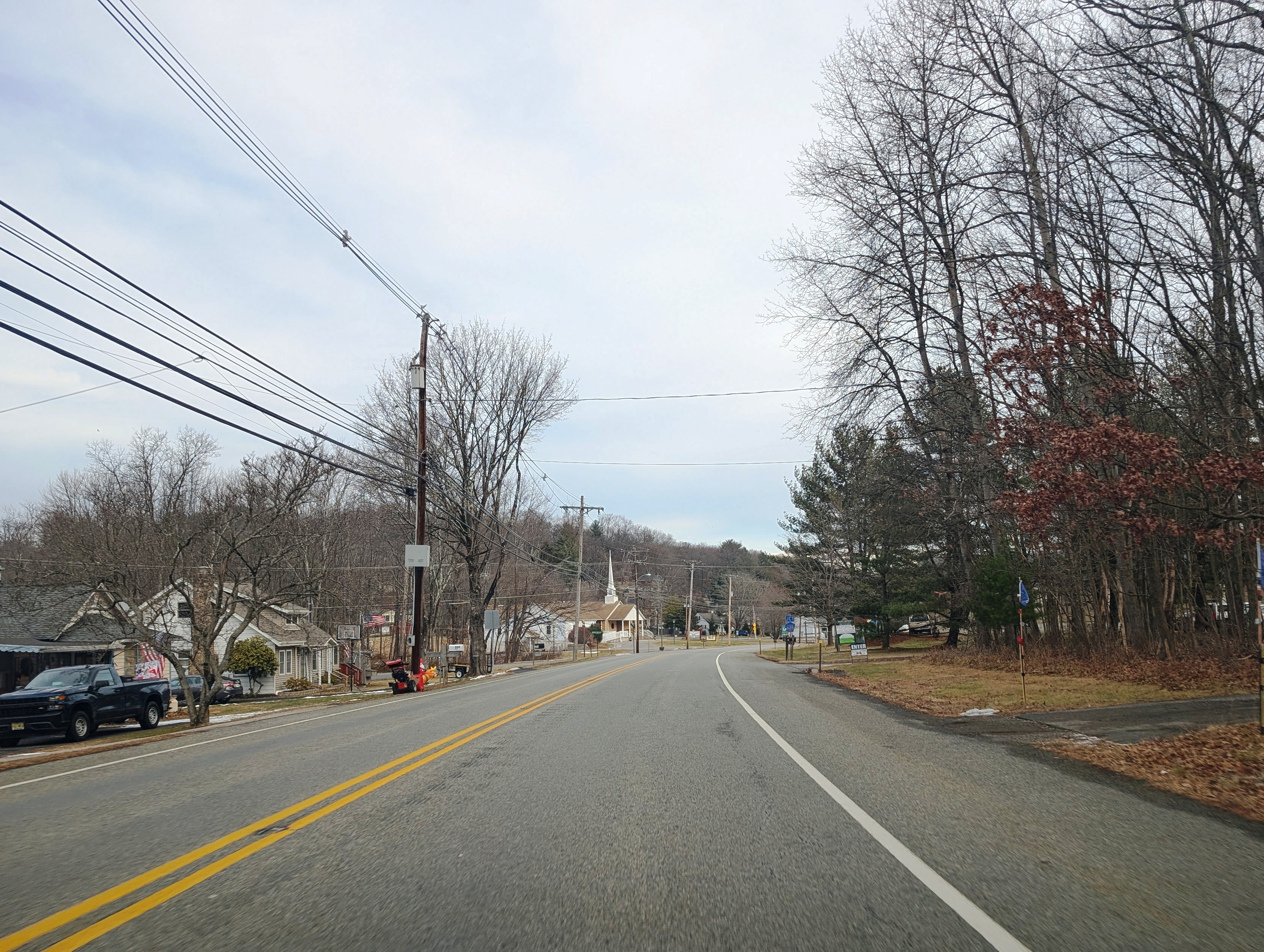
- CR 513 northbound in Bunnvale

- Location within Hunterdon County; Inset: Location of county in the state of New Jersey Bunnvale, New Jersey (New Jersey) Bunnvale, New Jersey (the United States)
- Coordinates: 40°42′06″N 74°53′00″W
- Country: United States
- State: New Jersey
- County: Hunterdon
- Township: Lebanon
- Elevation: 699 ft (213 m)
- Time zone: UTC−05:00 (Eastern (EST))
  - Summer (DST): UTC−04:00 (EDT)
- GNIS feature ID: 875030

Bunnvale is an unincorporated community located within Lebanon Township, Hunterdon County, in the U.S. state of New Jersey.

Bunnvale is located on County Route 513, approximately 4 mi (6.4 km) northwest of Lebanon Borough. The Raritan River and the Ken Lockwood Gorge Wildlife Management Area are located east of Bunnvale.

== Notable people ==
People who were born in, residents of, or otherwise closely associated with Bunnvale include:

- Mary Decker (born 1958), middle-distance runner in National Track and Field Hall of Fame
