= Lebanon Township, New Jersey =

Township in Hunterdon County, New Jersey, US

- Township
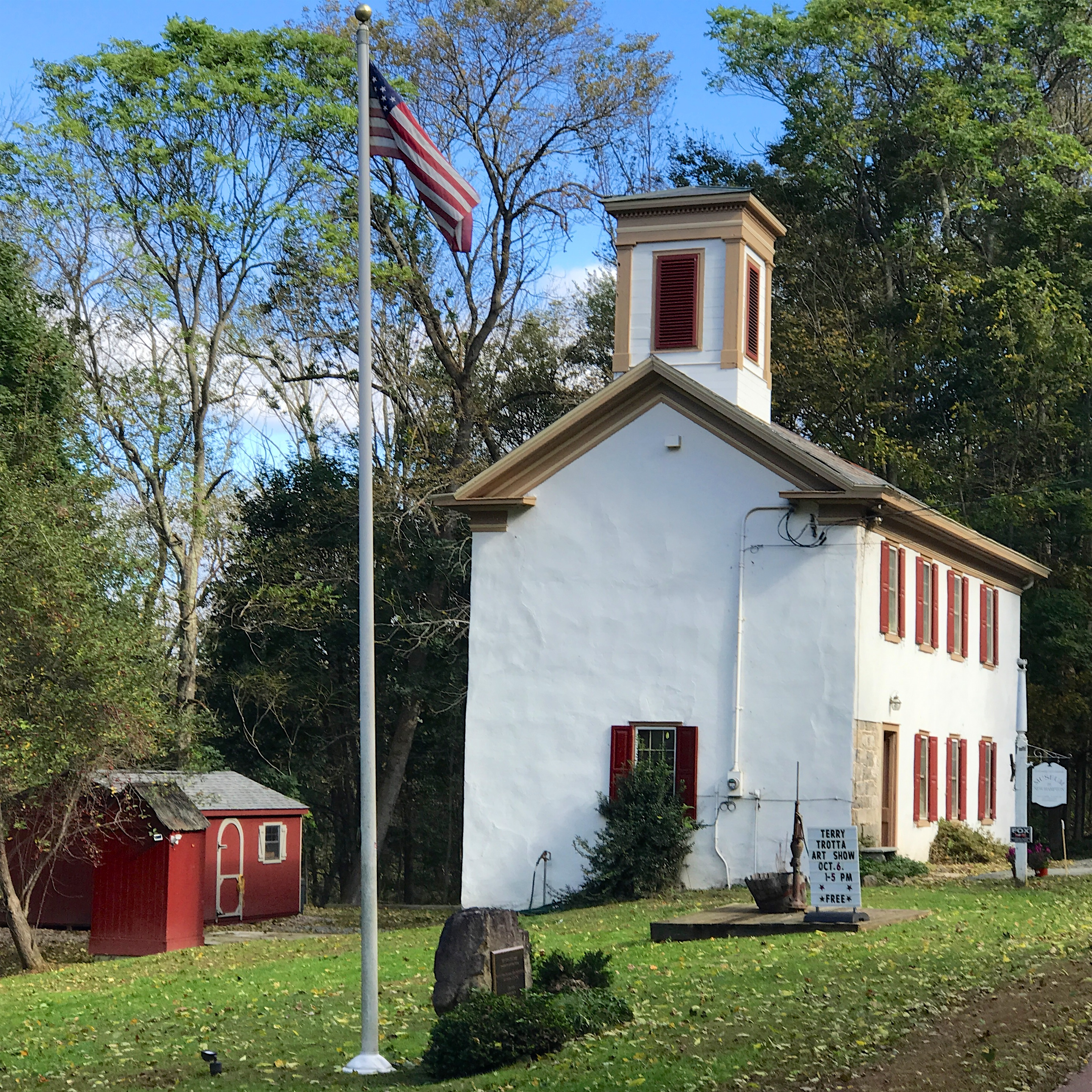
- Lebanon Township Museum

- Seal

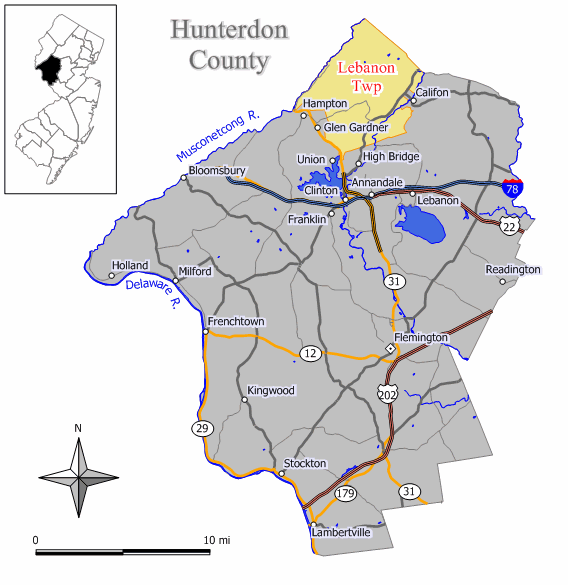
- Location of Lebanon Township in Hunterdon County highlighted in yellow (right). Inset map: Location of Hunterdon County in New Jersey highlighted in black (left).

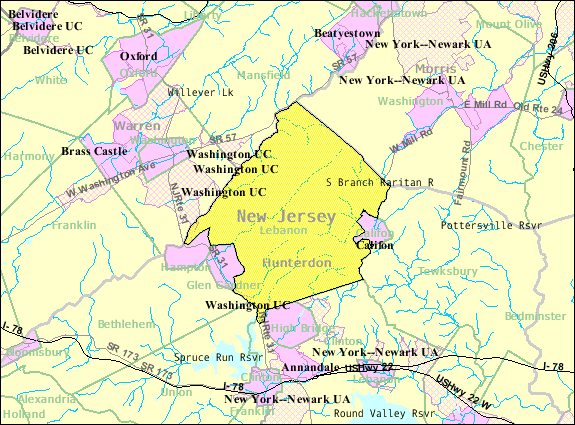
- Census Bureau map of Lebanon Township, New Jersey

- Location in Hunterdon County Location in New Jersey Location in the United States
- Coordinates: 40.726369°N 74.894408°W
- Country: United States
- State: New Jersey
- County: Hunterdon
- First mention: October 26, 1731
- Incorporated: February 21, 1798

Government
  - Type: Township
  - Body: Township Committee
  - Mayor: Beverly Koehler (R, term ends December 31, 2023)
  - Municipal clerk: Karen Sandorse

Area
  - Total: 31.68 sq mi (82.05 km^{2})
  - Land: 31.43 sq mi (81.40 km^{2})
  - Water: 0.25 sq mi (0.66 km^{2}) 0.80%
  - Rank: 81st of 565 in state 7th of 26 in county
- Elevation: 925 ft (282 m)

Population (2020)
  - Total: 6,195
  - Estimate (2023): 6,212
  - Rank: 339th of 565 in state 5th of 26 in county
  - Density: 197.1/sq mi (76.1/km^{2})
  - Rank: 504th of 565 in state 18th of 26 in county
- Time zone: UTC−05:00 (Eastern (EST))
  - Summer (DST): UTC−04:00 (Eastern (EDT))
- ZIP Code: 07830, 07865, 07882, 08809, 08826, 08827
- Area code: 908
- FIPS code: 3401939660
- GNIS feature ID: 0882191
- Website: www.lebanontownship.net

Lebanon Township (pronounced "LEB-uh-nin") is the northernmost township in Hunterdon County, in the U.S. state of New Jersey. As of the 2020 United States census, the township's population was 6,195, a decrease of 393 (−6.0%) from the 2010 census count of 6,588, which in turn reflected an increase of 772 (+13.3%) from the 5,816 counted in the 2000 census.

Located within the Raritan Valley region, the township is situated in the northernmost part of Hunterdon County bordering both Morris and Warren counties. When Lebanon Township was created in 1731, its original borders extended from the Musconetcong River to Readington Township.

== History ==
Lebanon Township was first mentioned on October 26, 1731, as having been formed partly from the now-defunct Amwell Township, though the exact circumstances of its formation are unknown. Lebanon Township was incorporated as one of New Jersey's initial 104 townships by an act of the New Jersey Legislature on February 21, 1798. Portions of the township have been taken to form Tewksbury Township (March 11, 1755), Clinton Township (April 12, 1841), High Bridge borough (February 19, 1898), Junction borough (February 20, 1895, now known as Hampton borough), Califon borough (April 2, 1898) and Glen Gardner borough (March 26, 1919).

Spruce Run Evangelical Lutheran Zion Church, a member of the New Jersey Synod and the Evangelical Lutheran Church in America, was established in 1774 by a group of 13 families. The church's current facility was constructed in 1870. The Mt. Bethel Evangelical Lutheran Church and Cemetery, popularly known as the Swack Church, is a historical Lutheran church; the burial ground of which houses plots dating as early as 1801.

In April 2024, a magnitude 4.8 earthquake struck New Jersey, with its epicenter in Lebanon Township.

== Geography ==
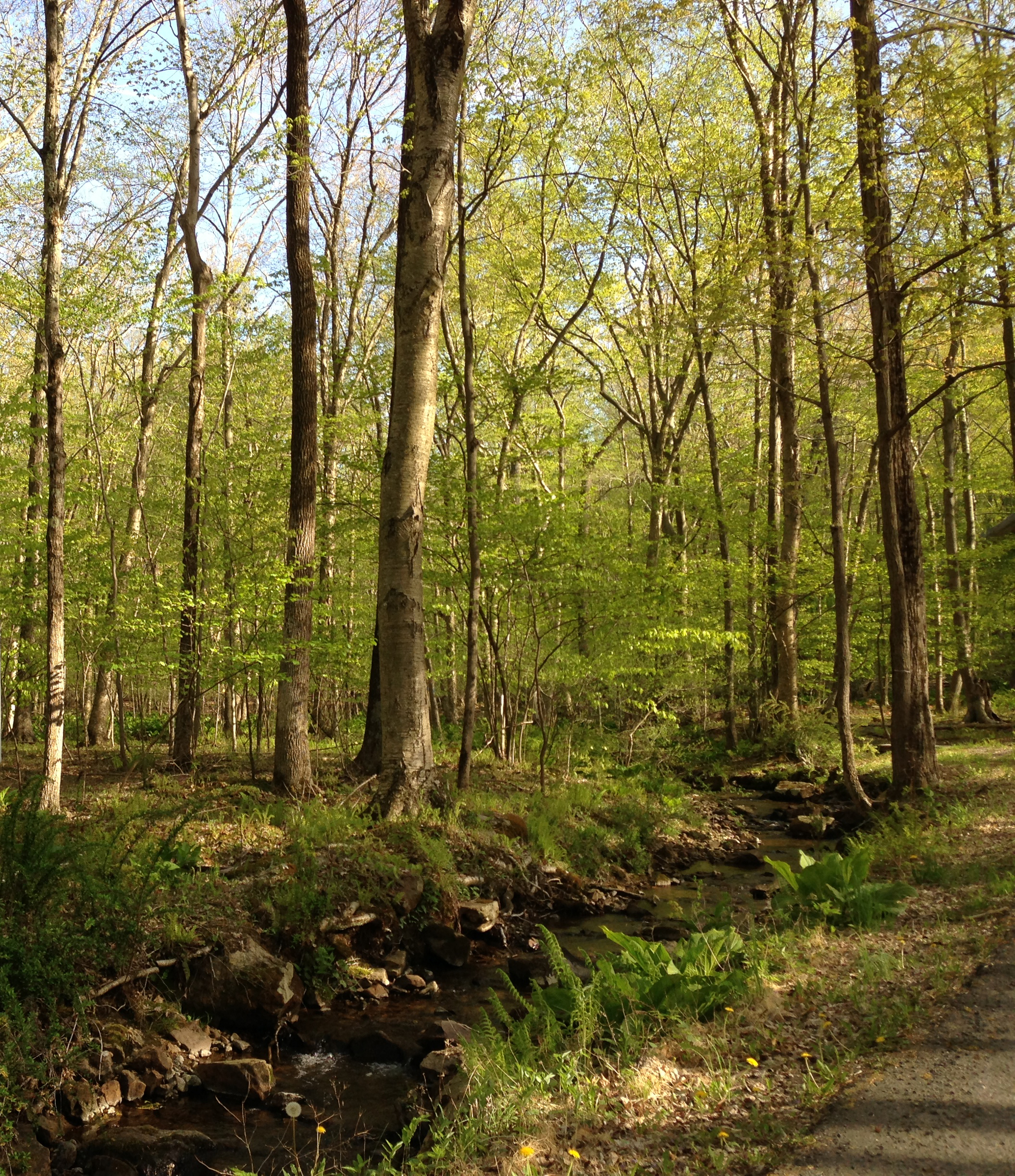
Natural landscape along Turkey Top Road in northern Lebanon Township, Hunterdon County, New Jersey

According to the United States Census Bureau, the township had a total area of 31.68 square miles (82.05 km^{2}), including 31.43 square miles (81.40 km^{2}) of land and 0.25 square miles (0.66 km^{2}) of water (0.80%).

Unincorporated communities, localities and place names located partially or completely within the township include Anthony, Bunnvale, Changewater, Hampton Junction, Hoffmans, Little Brook, Lower Valley, Mount Lebanon, New Hampton, Newport, Penwell, Red Mill, Saint Nicholas Village, Scrappy Corner, Spruce Run, Stone Mill, The Point and Woodglen.

The township borders Bethlehem Township, Califon, Clinton Township, Glen Gardner, Hampton, High Bridge, Tewksbury Township and Union Township in Hunterdon County; Washington Township in Morris County; and Mansfield Township and Washington Township in Warren County.

== Demographics ==
Historical population
Census	Pop.	Note	%±
1810	2,419		—
1820	2,817		16.5%
1830	3,436		22.0%
1840	3,849		12.0%
1850	2,128	*	−44.7%
1860	2,495		17.2%
1870	3,561		42.7%
1880	2,699		−24.2%
1890	2,337		−13.4%
1900	2,253	*	−3.6%
1910	2,179		−3.3%
1920	1,083	*	−50.3%
1930	1,269		17.2%
1940	1,437		13.2%
1950	1,971		37.2%
1960	2,841		44.1%
1970	4,235		49.1%
1980	5,459		28.9%
1990	5,679		4.0%
2000	5,816		2.4%
2010	6,588		13.3%
2020	6,195		−6.0%
2023 (est.)	6,212		0.3%
Population sources: 1810–1920 1840 1850–1870; 1850 1870 1880–1890; 1890–1910 1910–1930; 1940–2000 2000; 2010 2020 * = Lost territory in previous decade.

=== 2010 census ===
The 2010 United States census counted 6,588 people, 2,296 households, and 1,761 families in the township. The population density was 209.4 per square mile (80.8/km^{2}). There were 2,439 housing units at an average density of 77.5 per square mile (29.9/km^{2}). The racial makeup was 95.01% (6,259) White, 1.68% (111) Black or African American, 0.06% (4) Native American, 1.47% (97) Asian, 0.11% (7) Pacific Islander, 0.59% (39) from other races, and 1.08% (71) from two or more races. Hispanic or Latino of any race were 3.11% (205) of the population.

Of the 2,296 households, 33.6% had children under the age of 18; 66.7% were married couples living together; 6.6% had a female householder with no husband present and 23.3% were non-families. Of all households, 18.4% were made up of individuals and 7.2% had someone living alone who was 65 years of age or older. The average household size was 2.71 and the average family size was 3.11.

22.6% of the population were under the age of 18, 6.8% from 18 to 24, 19.8% from 25 to 44, 35.6% from 45 to 64, and 15.2% who were 65 years of age or older. The median age was 45.4 years. For every 100 females, the population had 99.1 males. For every 100 females ages 18 and older there were 98.0 males.

The Census Bureau's 2006–2010 American Community Survey showed that (in 2010 inflation-adjusted dollars) median household income was $96,489 (with a margin of error of +/− $7,123) and the median family income was $110,893 (+/− $29,973). Males had a median income of $78,056 (+/− $22,457) versus $56,346 (+/− $14,410) for females. The per capita income for the borough was $43,424 (+/− $5,347). About 4.4% of families and 5.9% of the population were below the poverty line, including 5.8% of those under age 18 and 1.6% of those age 65 or over.

=== 2000 census ===
As of the 2000 United States census there were 5,816 people, 1,963 households, and 1,556 families residing in the township. The population density was 183.5 inhabitants per square mile (70.8/km^{2}). There were 2,020 housing units at an average density of 63.7 per square mile (24.6/km^{2}). The racial makeup of the township was 96.97% White, 0.81% African American, 0.10% Native American, 0.93% Asian, 0.02% Pacific Islander, 0.38% from other races, and 0.79% from two or more races. Hispanic or Latino of any race were 1.72% of the population.

There were 1,963 households, out of which 38.5% had children under the age of 18 living with them, 71.1% were married couples living together, 5.5% had a female householder with no husband present, and 20.7% were non-families. 15.5% of all households were made up of individuals, and 5.5% had someone living alone who was 65 years of age or older. The average household size was 2.79 and the average family size was 3.15.

In the township the population was spread out, with 25.5% under the age of 18, 5.1% from 18 to 24, 28.9% from 25 to 44, 28.7% from 45 to 64, and 11.7% who were 65 years of age or older. The median age was 40 years. For every 100 females, there were 97.4 males. For every 100 females age 18 and over, there were 96.1 males.

The median income for a household in the township was $77,662, and the median income for a family was $86,145. Males had a median income of $58,306 versus $40,474 for females. The per capita income for the township was $30,793. About 1.0% of families and 2.0% of the population were below the poverty line, including none of those under age 18 and 8.4% of those age 65 or over.

== Arts and culture ==
Musical groups from the township include the Sleepy Man Banjo Boys, a bluegrass trio of the Mizzone brothers: Jonny (banjo), Robbie (fiddle) and Tommy (guitar)

== Parks and recreation ==
Lebanon Township hosts part of a rail trail that was created out of the former Central Railroad of New Jersey High Bridge Branch. The trail is maintained by Hunterdon County Parks and Recreation and is called the Columbia Trail, which includes a scenic area known as the Ken Lockwood Gorge.

== Government ==
=== Local government ===
Lebanon Township is governed under the Township form of government, a form used by 141 municipalities (of the 564) statewide. The Township Committee, comprised of five members, is elected directly by the voters at-large in partisan elections to serve three-year terms of office on a staggered basis, with either one or two seats coming up for election each year as part of the November general election in a three-year cycle. At an annual reorganization meeting held during the first week of January, the Township Committee selects one of its members to serve as Mayor and another as Deputy Mayor.

As of 2022, the Lebanon Township Committee consists of Mayor Beverly Koehler (R, term on committee ends December 31, 2025; term as mayor ends 2023), Deputy Mayor Thomas R. McKee (R, term on committee and as deputy mayor ends 2023), Abe Abuchowski (R, 2023; appointed to serve an unexpired term), Michael Schmidt (R, 2024) and Brian K. Wunder (R, 2025).

In January 2021, the Township Committee appointed Abe Abuchowski to fill the seat expiring in December 2022 that had been held by Brian Wunder who resigned from office the previous month. Abuchowski served on an interim basis until the November 2021 general election, when Guy Wilson was elected to serve the balance of the term of office.

=== Federal, state and county representation ===
Lebanon Township is located in the 7th Congressional District and is part of New Jersey's 23rd state legislative district.

For the 119th United States Congress, New Jersey's 7th congressional district is represented by Thomas Kean Jr. (R, Westfield). New Jersey is represented in the United States Senate by Democrats Cory Booker (Newark, term ends 2027) and Andy Kim (Moorestown, term ends 2031).

For the 2026–2027 session, the 23rd legislative district of the New Jersey Legislature is represented in the State Senate by Doug Steinhardt (R, Lopatcong Township) and in the General Assembly by John DiMaio (R, Hackettstown) and Erik Peterson (R, Franklin Township).

Hunterdon County is governed by a Board of County Commissioners comprised of five members who are elected at-large on a partisan basis to serve three-year terms of office on a staggered basis, with either one or two seats up for election each year as part of the November general election. At an annual reorganization meeting held each January, the commissioners select one member to serve as the board's Director and another to serve as Deputy Director, each for a one-year term. As of 2025, Hunterdon County's Commissioners are Director John E. Lanza (R; Raritan Township, 2025), Deputy Director Shaun C. Van Doren (R; Tewksbury Township, 2026), Jeff Kuhl (R; Raritan Township, 2027), Zachary T. Rich (R; West Amwell Township, 2025) and Susan Soloway (R; Franklin Township, 2027).

Constitutional officers elected on a countywide basis are Clerk Mary H. Melfi (R; Flemington, 2026), Sheriff Fredrick W. Brown (R; Alexandria Township, 2025) and Surrogate Heidi Rohrbach (R; Lebanon Township, 2028).

=== Politics ===
As of March 2011, there were a total of 4,366 registered voters in Lebanon Township, of which 723 (16.6%) were registered as Democrats, 1,759 (40.3%) were registered as Republicans and 1,881 (43.1%) were registered as Unaffiliated. There were 3 voters registered as Libertarians or Greens.

Gubernatorial election results for Lebanon Township
Year	Republican		Democratic		Third party(ies)	
Year	No.	%	No.	%	No.	%
2025	1,977	59.44%	1,328	39.93%	21	0.63%
2021	1,919	67.50%	898	31.59%	26	0.91%
2017	1,455	65.96%	700	31.73%	51	2.31%
2013	1,547	75.65%	447	21.86%	51	2.49%
2009	1,851	70.84%	539	20.63%	223	8.53%
2005	1,370	65.71%	602	28.87%	113	5.42%

In the 2012 presidential election, Republican Mitt Romney received 63.3% of the vote (2,048 cast), ahead of Democrat Barack Obama with 35.3% (1,140 votes), and other candidates with 1.4% (46 votes), among the 3,250 ballots cast by the township's 4,543 registered voters (16 ballots were spoiled), for a turnout of 71.5%. In the 2008 presidential election, Republican John McCain received 60.4% of the vote (2,119 cast), ahead of Democrat Barack Obama with 37.2% (1,305 votes) and other candidates with 1.7% (59 votes), among the 3,507 ballots cast by the township's 4,450 registered voters, for a turnout of 78.8%. In the 2004 presidential election, Republican George W. Bush received 63.9% of the vote (2,152 ballots cast), outpolling Democrat John Kerry with 34.7% (1,170 votes) and other candidates with 1.2% (49 votes), among the 3,370 ballots cast by the township's 4,249 registered voters, for a turnout percentage of 79.3.

United States presidential election results for Lebanon Township
Year	Republican		Democratic		Third party(ies)	
Year	No.	%	No.	%	No.	%
2024	2,387	59.30%	1,552	38.56%	86	2.14%
2020	2,462	58.45%	1,651	39.20%	99	2.35%
2016	2,127	61.37%	1,170	33.76%	169	4.88%
2012	2,048	63.33%	1,140	35.25%	46	1.42%
2008	2,119	60.84%	1,305	37.47%	59	1.69%
2004	2,152	63.84%	1,170	34.71%	49	1.45%

In the 2013 gubernatorial election, Republican Chris Christie received 74.6% of the vote (1,547 cast), ahead of Democrat Barbara Buono with 23.0% (477 votes), and other candidates with 2.5% (51 votes), among the 2,118 ballots cast by the township's 4,499 registered voters (43 ballots were spoiled), for a turnout of 47.1%. In the 2009 gubernatorial election, Republican Chris Christie received 70.3% of the vote (1,851 ballots cast), ahead of Democrat Jon Corzine with 20.5% (539 votes), Independent Chris Daggett with 7.9% (208 votes) and other candidates with 0.6% (15 votes), among the 2,633 ballots cast by the township's 4,396 registered voters, yielding a 59.9% turnout.

United States Senate election results for Lebanon Township1
Year	Republican		Democratic		Third party(ies)	
Year	No.	%	No.	%	No.	%
2024	2,261	59.34%	1,459	38.29%	90	2.36%
2018	1,974	63.76%	1,027	33.17%	95	3.07%
2012	1,858	61.18%	1,065	35.07%	114	3.75%
2006	1,284	61.73%	696	33.46%	100	4.81%

United States Senate election results for Lebanon Township2
Year	Republican		Democratic		Third party(ies)	
Year	No.	%	No.	%	No.	%
2020	2,485	60.20%	1,526	36.97%	117	2.83%
2014	1,158	67.48%	507	29.55%	51	2.97%
2013	1,012	68.06%	463	31.14%	12	0.81%
2008	2,143	65.58%	988	30.23%	137	4.19%

== Education ==
The Lebanon Township Schools serves students in pre-kindergarten through eighth grade. As of the 2018–19 school year, the district, comprised of two schools, had an enrollment of 624 students and 64.6 classroom teachers (on an FTE basis), for a student–teacher ratio of 9.7:1. Schools in the district (with 2018–19 enrollment data from the National Center for Education Statistics) are Valley View School with 310 students in grades Pre-K–4 and Woodglen School with 320 students in grades 5–8. Both schools are located in Lebanon Township, but have a Califon mailing address.

Public school students in ninth through twelfth grades attend Voorhees High School, which also serves students from Califon, Glen Gardner, Hampton, High Bridge and Tewksbury Township. As of the 2018–2019 school year, the high school had an enrollment of 982 students and 83.1 classroom teachers (on an FTE basis), for a student–teacher ratio of 11.8:1. The school is part of the North Hunterdon-Voorhees Regional High School District, which also includes students from Bethlehem Township, Clinton Town, Clinton Township, Franklin Township, Lebanon Borough and Union Township who attend North Hunterdon High School in Annandale.

Eighth grade students from all of Hunterdon County are eligible to apply to attend the high school programs offered by the Hunterdon County Vocational School District, a county-wide vocational school district that offers career and technical education at its campuses in Raritan Township and at programs sited at local high schools, with no tuition charged to students for attendance.

Lebanon Township is also home to the Hunterdon Learning Center, an alternative education school founded by James Butters in 1975.

== Points of interest ==
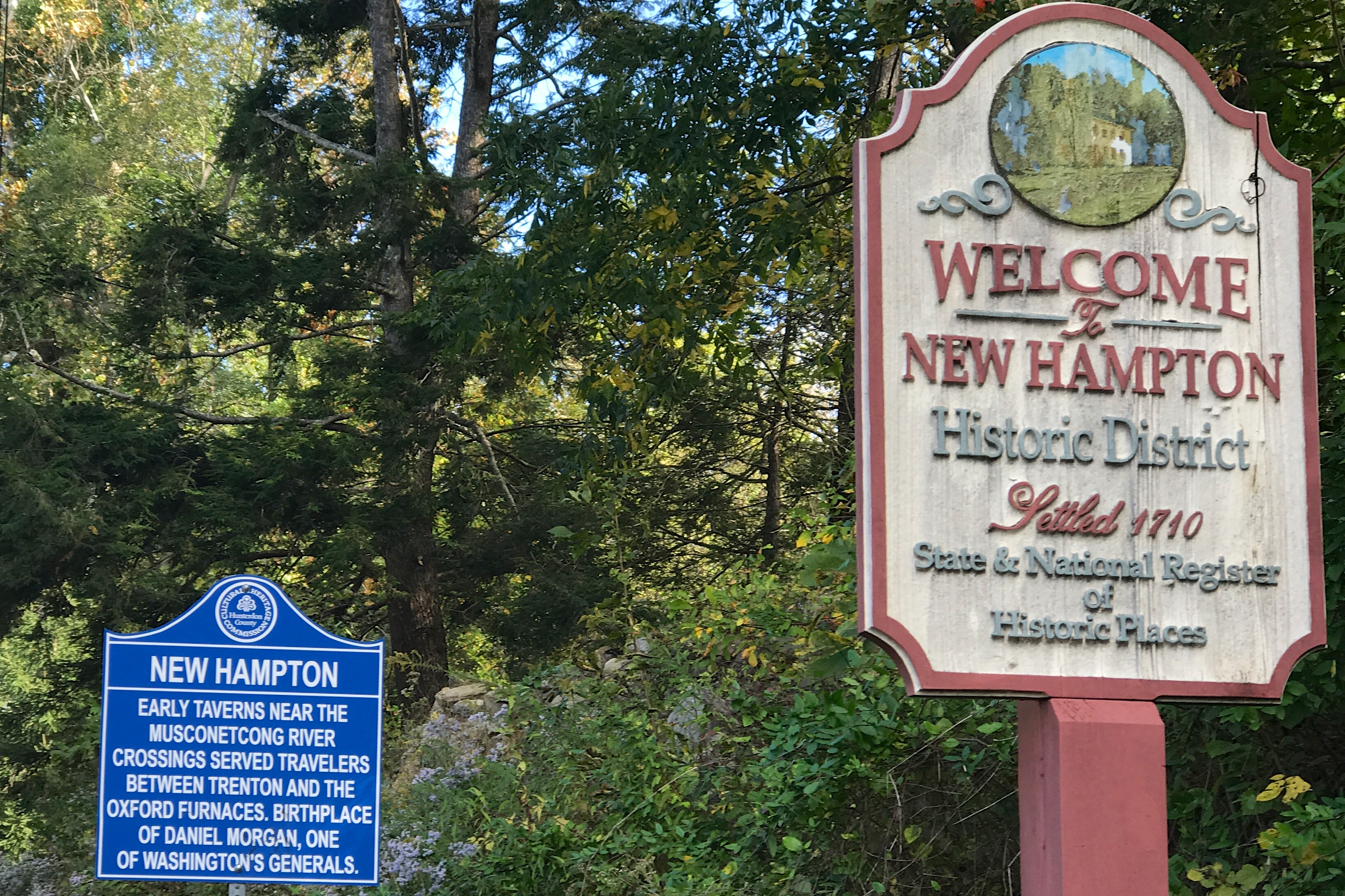
New Hampton Historic District

The New Hampton Historic District, including the New Hampton Pony Pratt Truss Bridge, are listed on the National Register of Historic Places. The Lebanon Township Museum, built c. 1825, is a contributing property of the district. It includes a memorial to General Daniel Morgan, who was born here and served in the American Revolutionary War.

== Transportation ==
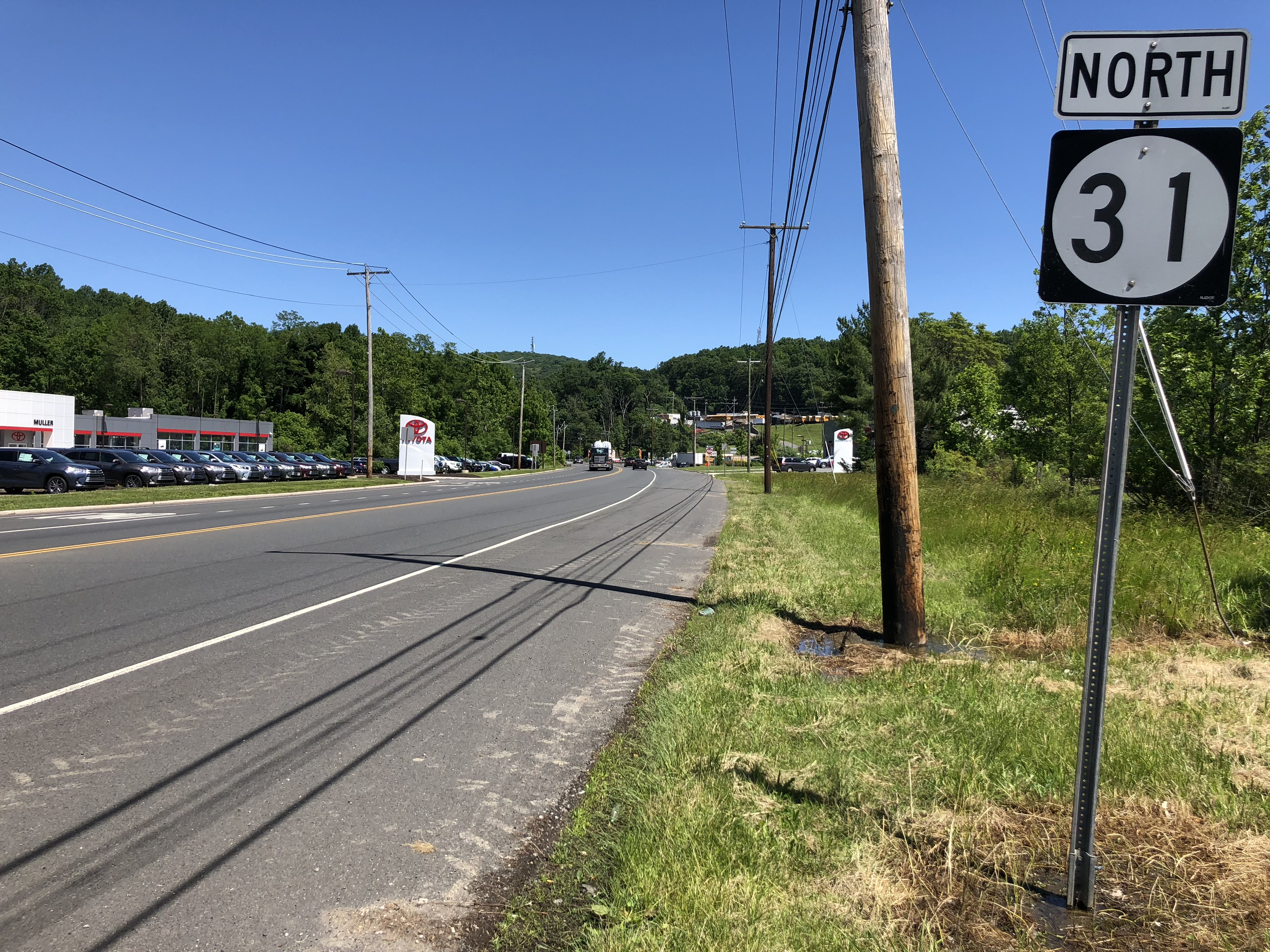
Route 31 northbound in Lebanon Township

=== Roads and highways ===
As of May 2010, the township had a total of 89.89 miles (144.66 km) of roadways, of which 75.20 miles (121.02 km) were maintained by the municipality, 12.96 miles (20.86 km) by Hunterdon County and 1.73 miles (2.78 km) by the New Jersey Department of Transportation.

Route 31 passes through the township, providing access to Interstate 78.

=== Public transportation ===
Local bus service was provided by NJ Transit on the 884 route, until it was discontinued in 2010. Train service on the Raritan Valley Line is available at the High Bridge station, located just outside of the township.

The Hunterdon County LINK provides bus service on Route 15, which passes through the western part of the township along Route 31.

== Notable people ==
People who were born in, residents of, or otherwise closely associated with Lebanon Township include:

- Adrienne Adams (1906–2002), children's book illustrator
- Lonzo Anderson (1905–1993), children's author
- Wilson Bowlby (1818–1895), doctor and politician who served as the President of the Oregon State Senate in 1862
- Alvah A. Clark (1840–1912), lawyer and politician who represented New Jersey's 4th congressional district in the United States House of Representatives from 1877 to 1881
- Julie Culley (born 1981), member of the 2012 US Olympic Team for the women's 5000m competition
- Mary Decker (born 1958), former track athlete
- Merv Griffin (1925–2007), television producer owned a farm in Lebanon Township, though it had a Califon mailing address
- Daniel Morgan (1735–1802), pioneer, soldier and politician, who was one of the most respected battlefield tacticians of the American Revolutionary War and served in the United States House of Representatives from 1797 to 1799
- Joe Piscopo (born 1951), comedian, actor, musical entertainer and nationally syndicated radio talk show host best known for his work on Saturday Night Live
- Helen Walulik (1929–2012), pitcher and an outfield/infield utility who played for three seasons in the All-American Girls Professional Baseball League
- Bernie Worrell (1944–2016), keyboardist and founding member of Parliament-Funkadelic
