= Sleepy Man =

American bluegrass band

- Also known as: Sleepy Man Banjo Boys
- Origin: Lebanon Township, New Jersey, United States
- Genres: Bluegrass
- Years active: 2011–present
- Members: Tommy Mizzone; Robbie Mizzone; Jonny Mizzone; Josh Thomas
- Website: www.sleepyman.com

Sleepy Man (prior to late 2014 known as Sleepy Man Banjo Boys) is a bluegrass music band from Lebanon Township, New Jersey, United States. It is composed of the Mizzone Brothers: Jonny (born March 14, 2002, banjo), Robbie (born November 7, 1998, fiddle and vocals) and Tommy (born July 14 1997, guitar and background vocals) as well as bass player Josh Thomas.

The group's debut album America's Music, was released in October 2011. Their second CD, The Farthest Horizon, was released in October 2012. In February 2014, they released the single "Run", their first song on which one of them, Robbie, sings. Their third album "By My Side" was released in June 2014 with one instrumental song and five vocal songs.

At the 14th Annual Independent Music Awards in 2015, the Sleepy Man Banjo Boys won awards in the "Instrumental" and "Americana" song categories for "Wildflower" and "Flesh & Bones".

== Appearances ==
On June 28, 2011, the trio appeared on the Late Show with David Letterman and twice on The Mike Huckabee talk show. They have played at several bluegrass festivals, the Newport Folk Festival, including one with J.D. Crowe and the New South, and benefits.

The Sleepy Man Banjo Boys made their Grand Ole Opry debut on August 20, 2011. They have also performed at TED conferences in 2012 and 2013.

== Discography ==
=== Albums ===
Title	Album details	Peak chart positions		Notes
Title	Album details	US Grass	US Heat	Notes
America's Music	Release date: September 21, 2011; Label: self-released	8	—	Track listing: 1. "Clinch Mountain Backstep" (1:59); 2. "Fireball Mail" (2:11); 3. "Foggy Mountain Breakdown" (2:03); 4. "Midnight Ramble" (2:00); 5. "Salt Creek" (2:11); 6. "Flint Hill Special"; 7. "Bugle Call Rag" (2:18); 8. "Lonesome Reuben" (2:44); 9. "John Hardy" (2:14); 10. "Blue Railroad Train" (1:55); 11. "I'll Fly Away" (2:34); 12. "Lee Highway Blues" (1:45); 13. "Flint Hill Special" (with J.D. Crowe) (2:42)
The Farthest Horizon	Release date: October 9, 2012; Label: self-released	3	29	Track listing: 1. "Time Lapse" (2:10); 2. "The Farthest Horizon" (2:53); 3. "Gold Rush" (3:21); 4. "Lexie Lou" (2:49); 5. "How Deep the Father's Love for Us" (with Ashley Lilly) (3:30); 6. "The Man from Danville" (3:13); 7. "Jonny's Tune" (2:13); 8. "When the Angels Carry Me Home"; 9. "Always the One" (with Ashley Lilly) (2:26); 10. "Farewell Darling" (1:17); 11. "Shuckin' the Corn" (2:23)
By My Side	Release date: June 25, 2014; Label: self-released	14	—	Track listing: 1. "By My Side"; 2. "Man In Your Corner"; 3. "Run"; 4. "Flesh & Bones"; 5. "Same Same Stars"; 6. "Wildflower"
"—" denotes the album failed to chart
