= New Hampton Historic District =

Historic district in New Jersey, United States

- U.S. National Register of Historic Places
- U.S. Historic district
- New Jersey Register of Historic Places
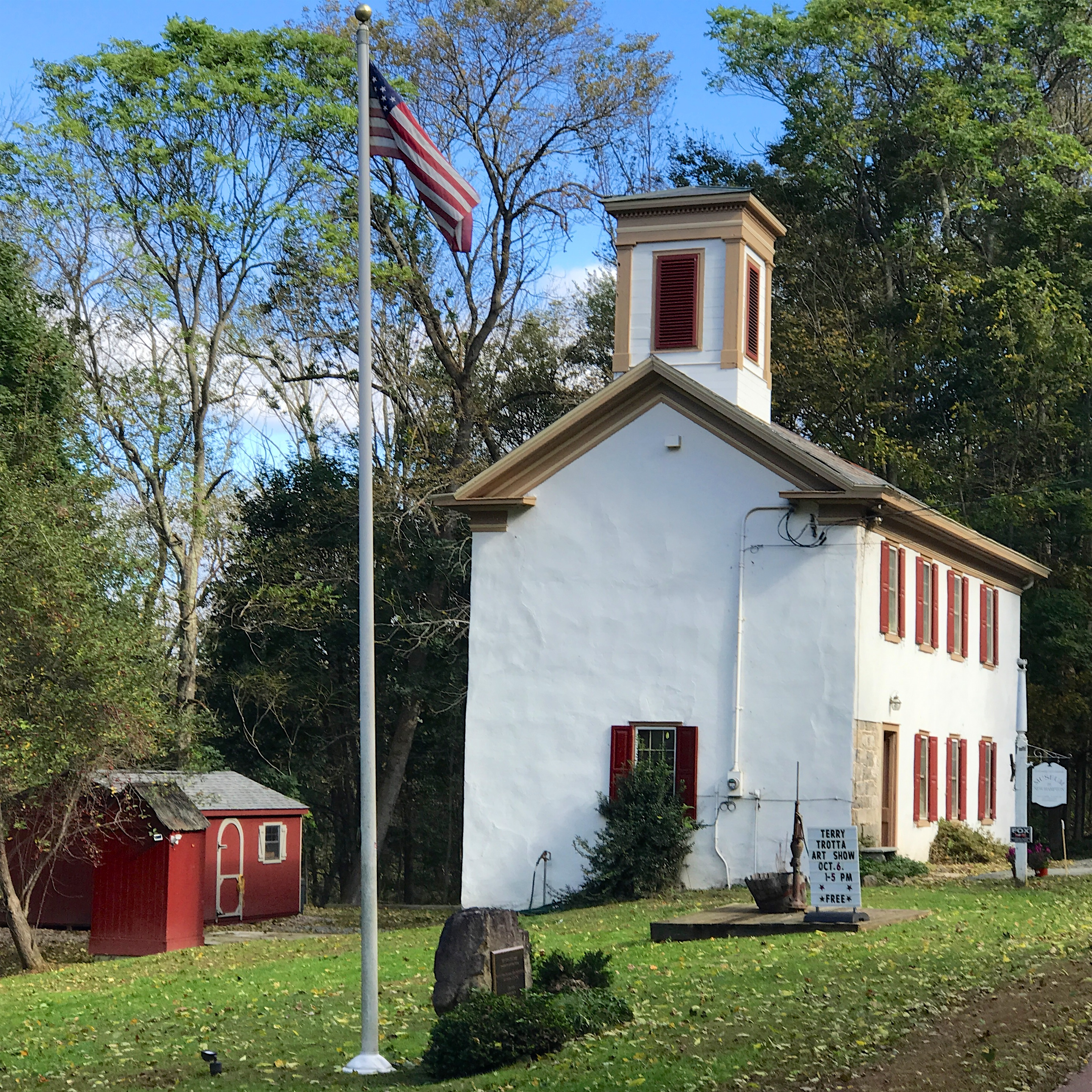
- Lebanon Township Museum, c. 1825 schoolhouse

- Location within Hunterdon County, New Jersey Location within New Jersey Location within the United States
- Location: Roughly along Musconetcong River Road, and Rymon Road; New Hampton, New Jersey
- Coordinates: 40°43′05″N 74°57′49″W
- Area: 76 acres (31 ha)
- Architectural style: Mid 19th Century Revival, Georgian
- NRHP reference No.: 98000257
- NJRHP No.: 87

Significant dates
- Added to NRHP: April 6, 1998
- Designated NJRHP: January 28, 1998

The New Hampton Historic District is a 76-acre (31 ha) historic district in the village of New Hampton in Lebanon Township in Hunterdon County, New Jersey, United States. The district was added to the National Register of Historic Places on April 6, 1998, for its significance in architecture, commerce, education, transportation, and community development from c. 1780 to 1929. It includes 42 contributing buildings, six contributing sites, and four contributing structures located along Musconetcong River Road.

The district includes the New Hampton Pony Pratt Truss Bridge across the Musconetcong River connecting Shoddy Mill Road in New Hampton with Rymon Road in Washington Township, Warren County.

== History ==
By 1784, Henry Dusenbery (1760–1825) was working in the village as a merchant, operating the storehouse now at 47 Musconetcong River Road.

== Gallery of contributing properties ==
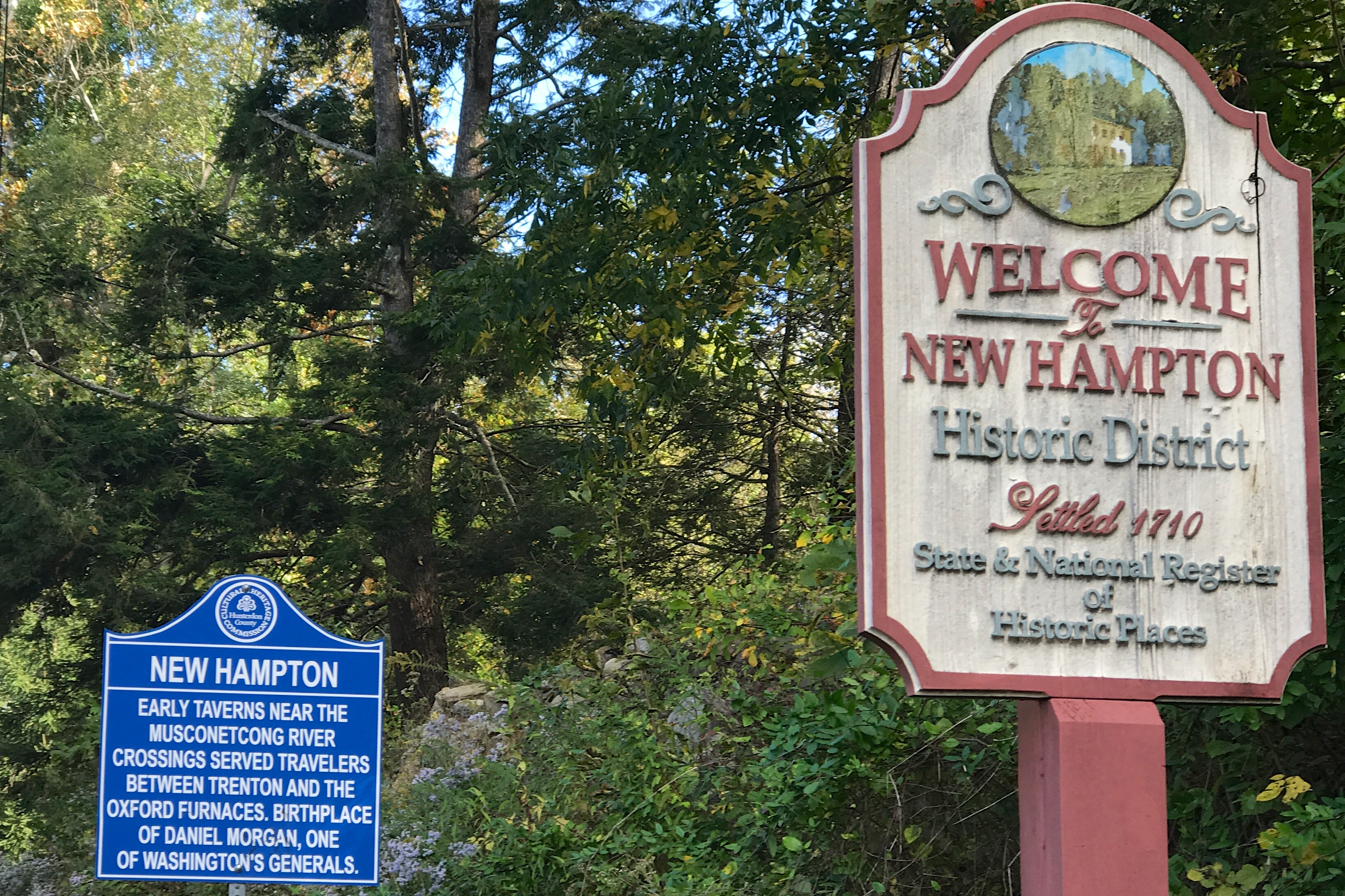
Welcome to New Hampton Historic District

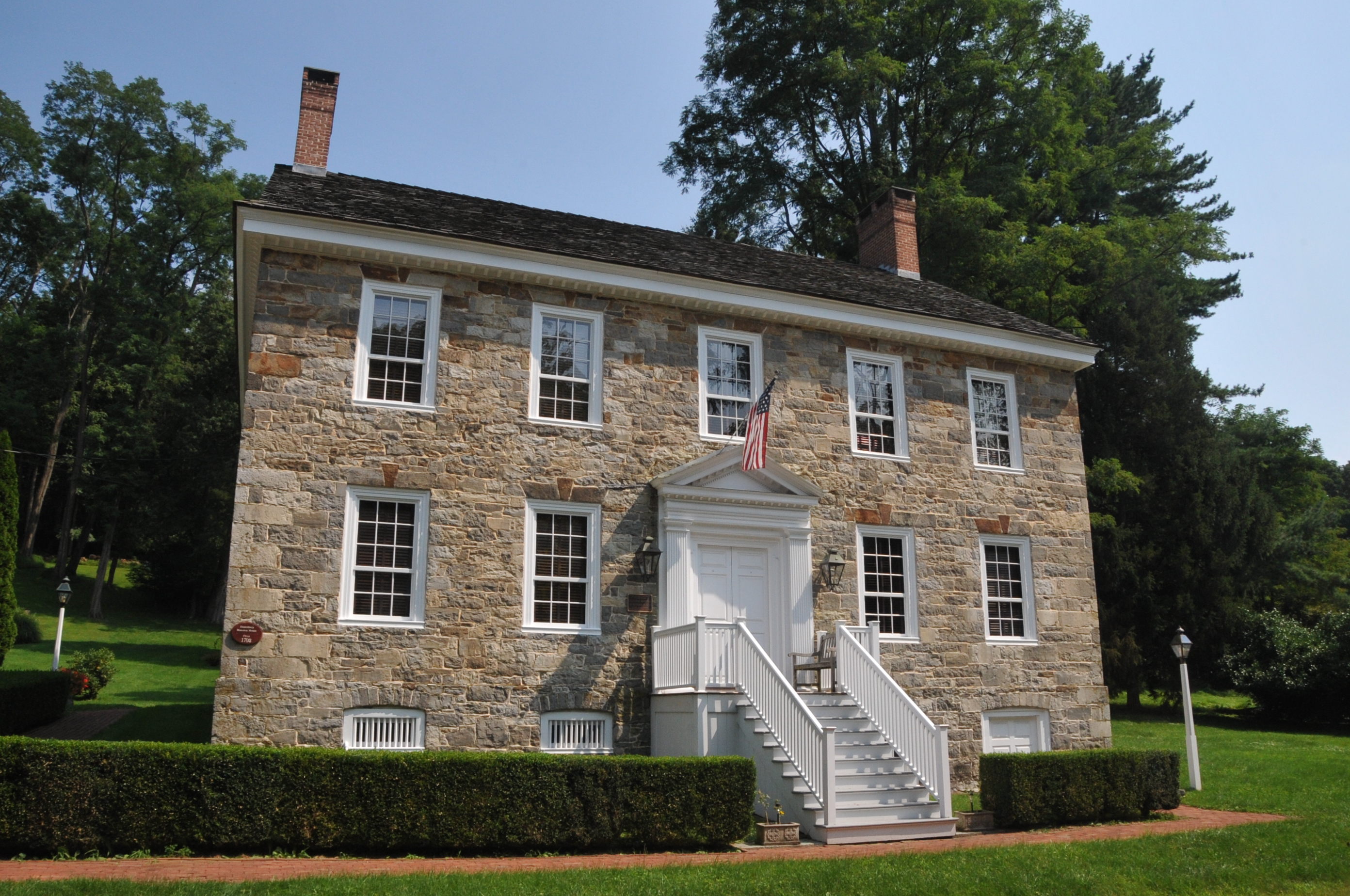
Henry Dusenbery Stone Mansion House

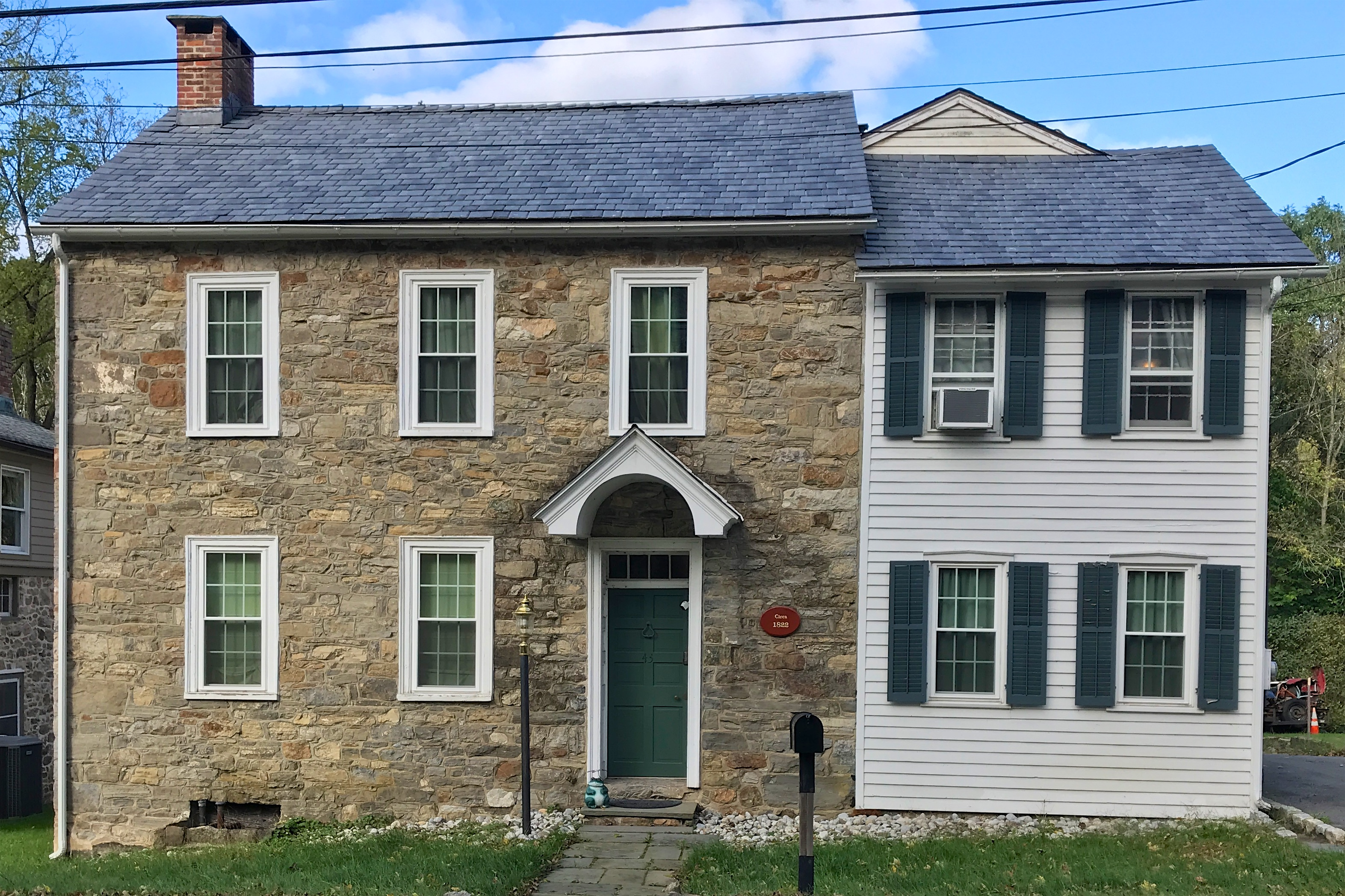
Said to be the house of Joseph Warren Dusenbery

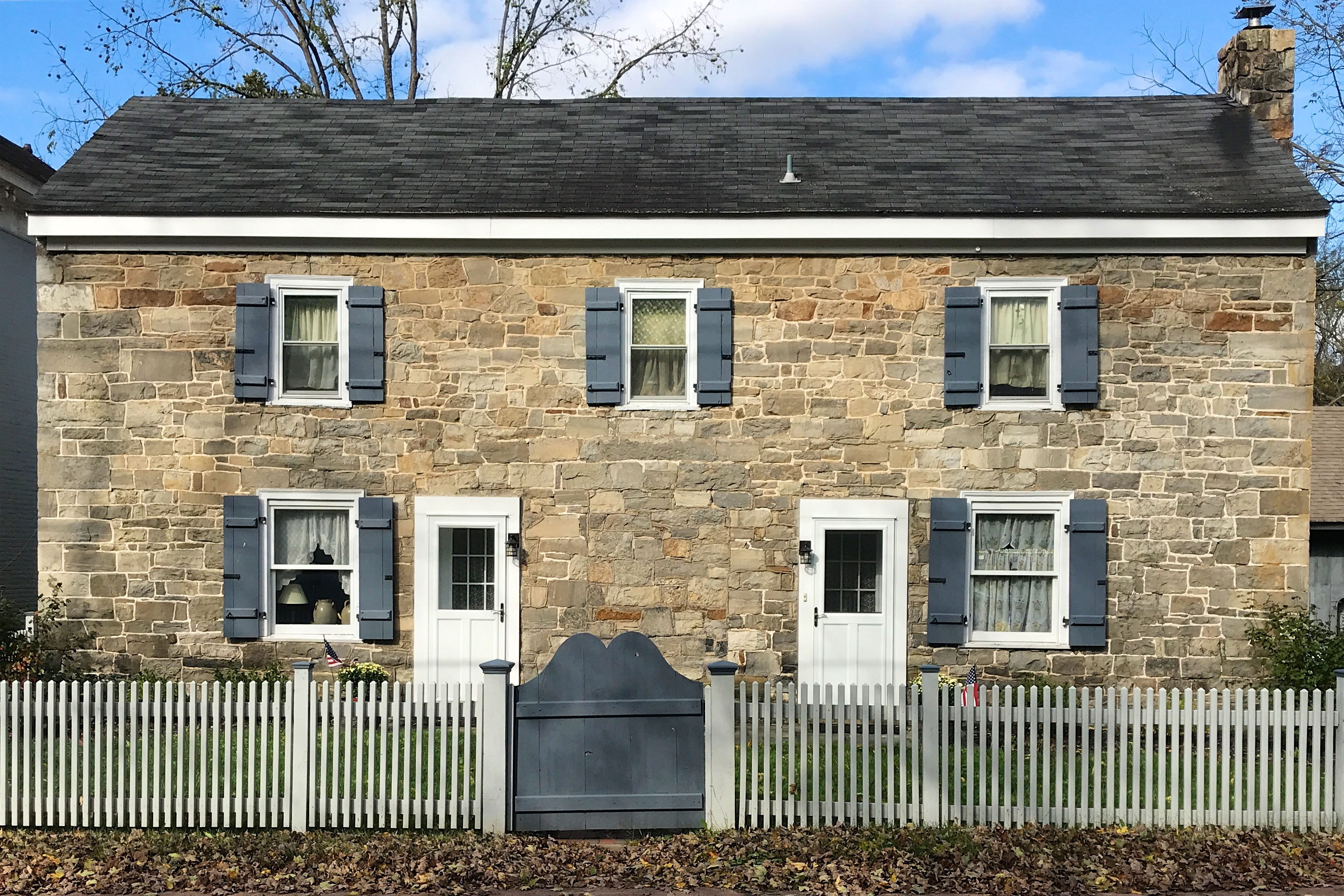
Former Henry Dusenbery Storehouse

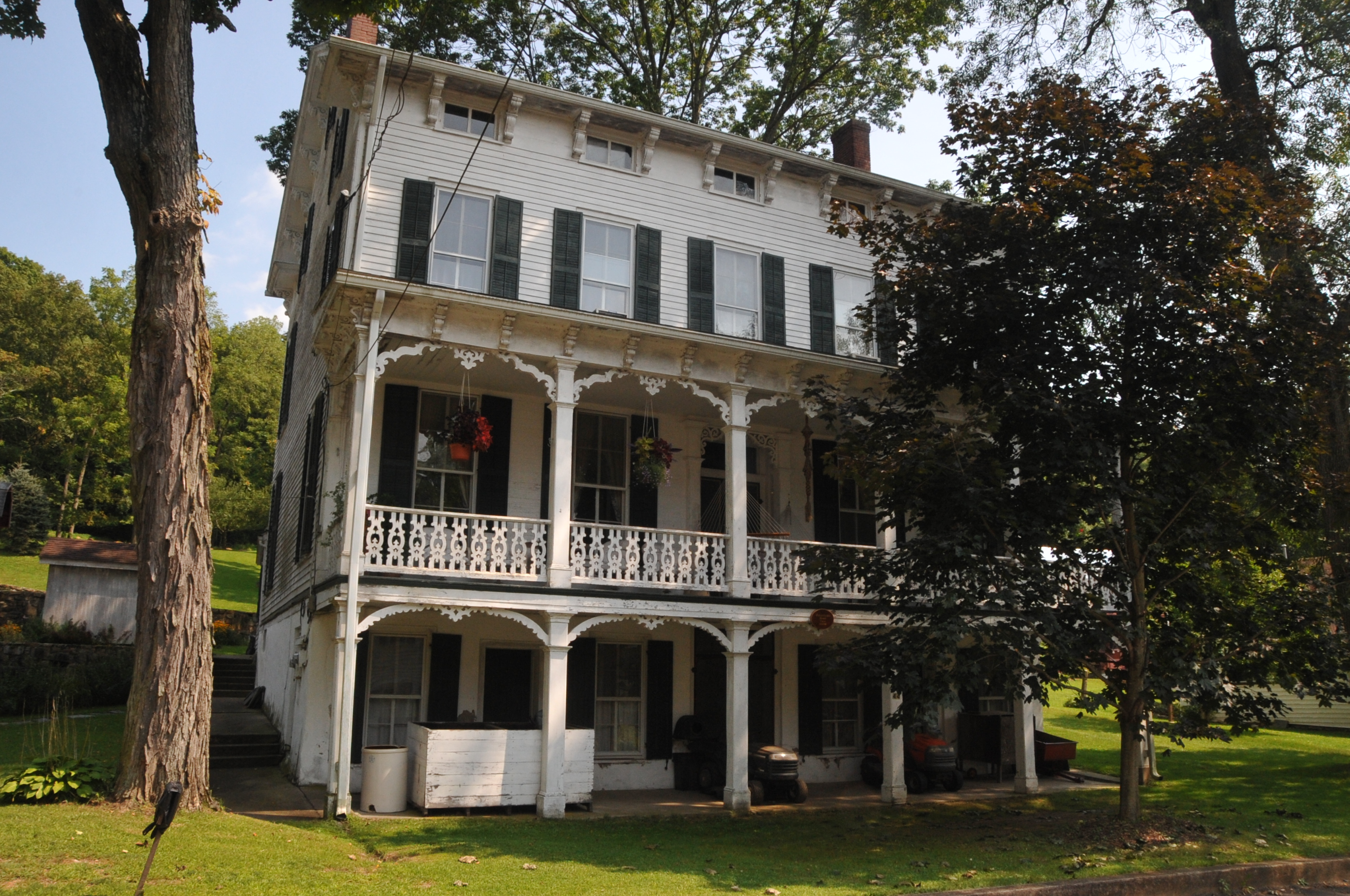
American Hotel

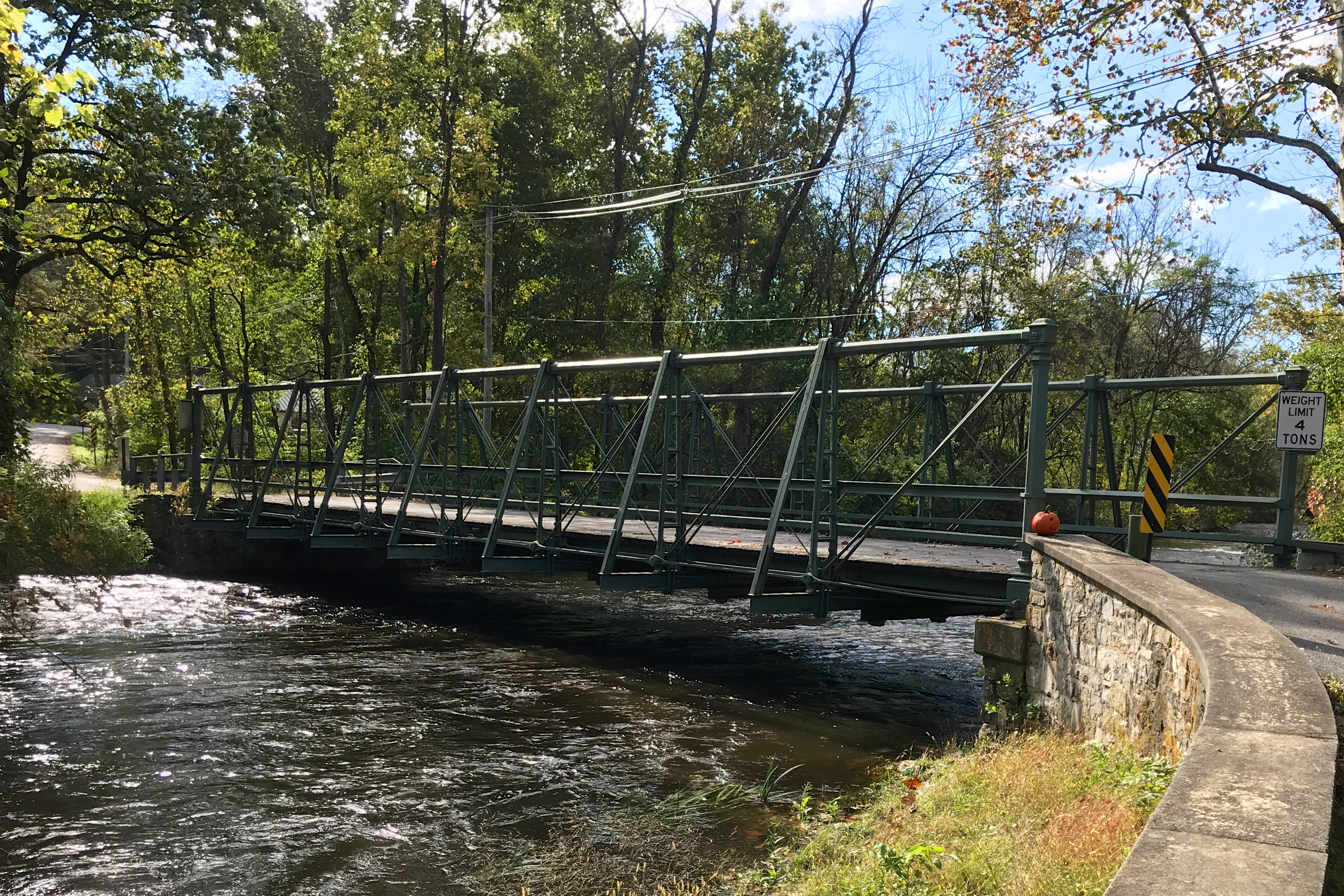
New Hampton Pony Pratt Truss Bridge across the Musconetcong River, view from Rymon Road

== See also ==
- National Register of Historic Places listings in Hunterdon County, New Jersey
