= Wilson Bowlby =

American politician (1818–1895)

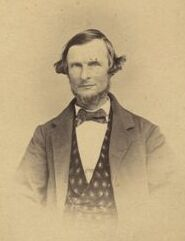
- Bowlby, c. 1850

2nd President of the Oregon State Senate
- In office 1862
- Preceded by: Luther Elkins
- Succeeded by: John H. Mitchell

Personal details
- Born: July 4, 1818 New Hampton, New Jersey, U.S.
- Died: January 15, 1895 (aged 76) Forest Grove, Oregon, U.S.
- Party: Republican
- Spouses: Lydia D. Jones (m. 1841; died 1883): Ellen L. Burlingame
- Children: 3
- Occupation: Doctor; politician

Wilson Bowlby (July 4, 1818 – January 15, 1895) was an American doctor and politician. A member of the Republican Party, he served as the President of the Oregon State Senate in 1862.

== Early life ==
Wilson Bowlby was born on July 4, 1818 in the New Hampton section of Lebanon Township, New Jersey. He went to New York City at the age of 18 where he worked in a store for three years. He married Lydia D. Jones in 1841 and together they then went to Cincinnati to attend medical lectures at the Eclectic Institute and in 1845 went to Indiana where he practiced medicine.

The two later he left Indiana by wagon in April, 1852 and arrived in the newly established Oregon Territory in August. He settling first in Portland, then spent one year there then moved south of Hillsboro then to Forest Grove in 1860. Bowlby practiced medicine in Forest Grove where he continued practicing medicine except for four years from 1869–1873 when he became a collector of internal revenue with a residence in Portland.

== Public service ==
Bowlby later entered public service and became a member of the last Oregon Territorial Legislature and also ran for and served in the State Legislature. Bowlby served in the House for four terms and the Senate for one term, the latter of which he rose as President of Oregon's State Senate.

In 1861, during the Civil War, Bowlby resigned from domestic politics and was appointed by President Lincoln as the Examining Physician under Captain Keler, Provost Marshall.

== Personal life and death ==
He married Lydia D. Jones of Newark, New Jersey, on July 4, 1841. The couple had three children J.Q.A. (John Quincy Adams) Bowlby, a prominent Astoria Oregon attorney; Theodore, who lived on the old ranch near Hilllsboro; and Sarah E. Coplen, of Latah, Washington.

His wife died in 1883 and the following year he was married to Ellen L. Burlingame. It is said that Bowlby has one of the most beautiful homes in the village of Forest Grove.

Bowlby died on January 15, 1895, in Forest Grove.
