= Luther Elkins =

American politician (1809–1887)

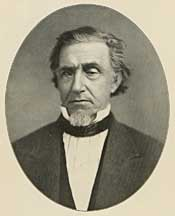

President of the Oregon State Senate
- In office 1860–1861
- Preceded by: Position established
- Succeeded by: Wilson Bowlby

Personal details
- Born: May 26, 1809 Cornville, Maine, U.S.
- Died: December 13, 1887 (aged 78) Oregon, U.S.
- Party: Democratic
- Spouse: Philotheta Williams
- Occupation: Politician; pioneer

Luther Elkins (May 26, 1809 – December 13, 1887) was an American politician and pioneer in the state of Oregon.

== Early life ==
Born in Cornville, Massachusetts (in Maine from 1820 on) and married to Philotheta Williams, he migrated to Oregon Territory in 1852, overland via the Oregon Trail.

== Career ==
He served in the Oregon Territorial Legislature and was a delegate to the Oregon Constitutional Convention. He was elected to the Oregon State Senate in 1858, serving in the 1859 special session, for which he was selected as the Oregon Senate's first President. He also served in the 1860 regular session, again as president.

== Death ==
He died on December 13, 1887, and is buried at the Pioneer Cemetery in Lebanon, Oregon.
