= New Hampton, New Jersey =

Populated place in Hunterdon County, New Jersey, US

- Unincorporated community
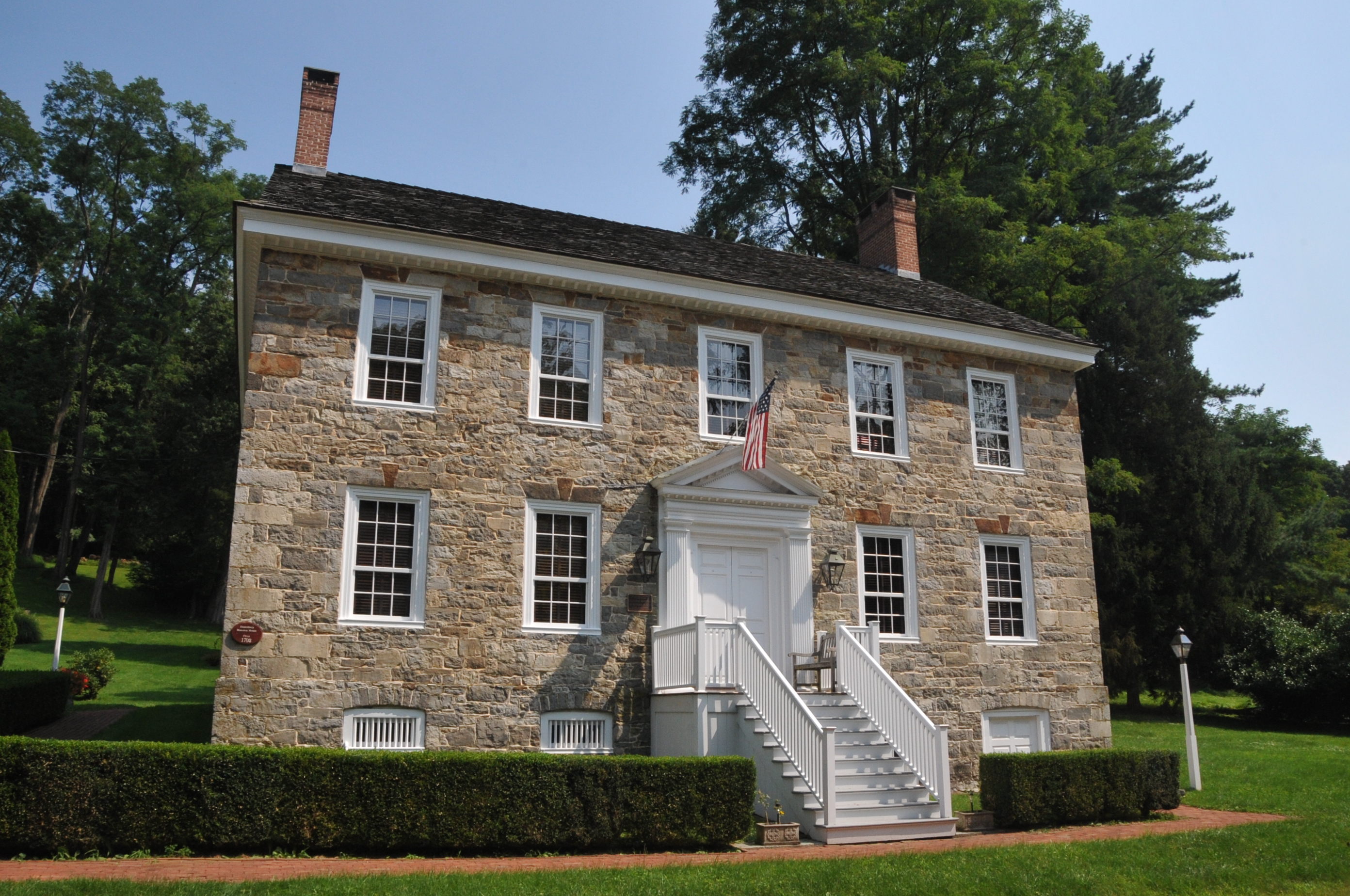
- Henry Dusenbery Stone Mansion House

- Location of New Hampton in Hunterdon County Inset: Location of county within the state of New Jersey New Hampton, New Jersey (New Jersey) New Hampton, New Jersey (the United States)
- Coordinates: 40°43′19″N 74°57′37″W
- Country: United States
- State: New Jersey
- County: Hunterdon
- Township: Lebanon
- Elevation: 377 ft (115 m)
- GNIS feature ID: 878738

New Hampton is an unincorporated community located within Lebanon Township in Hunterdon County, in the U.S. state of New Jersey.

New Hampton is the birthplace of Revolutionary War General Daniel Morgan.

== Points of interest ==
The New Hampton Historic District was added to the National Register of Historic Places on April 6, 1998 for its significance in architecture, commerce, education, transportation, and community development.

The Lebanon Township Museum, in the c. 1825 schoolhouse, supports local history and is next to the memorial to General Daniel Morgan.

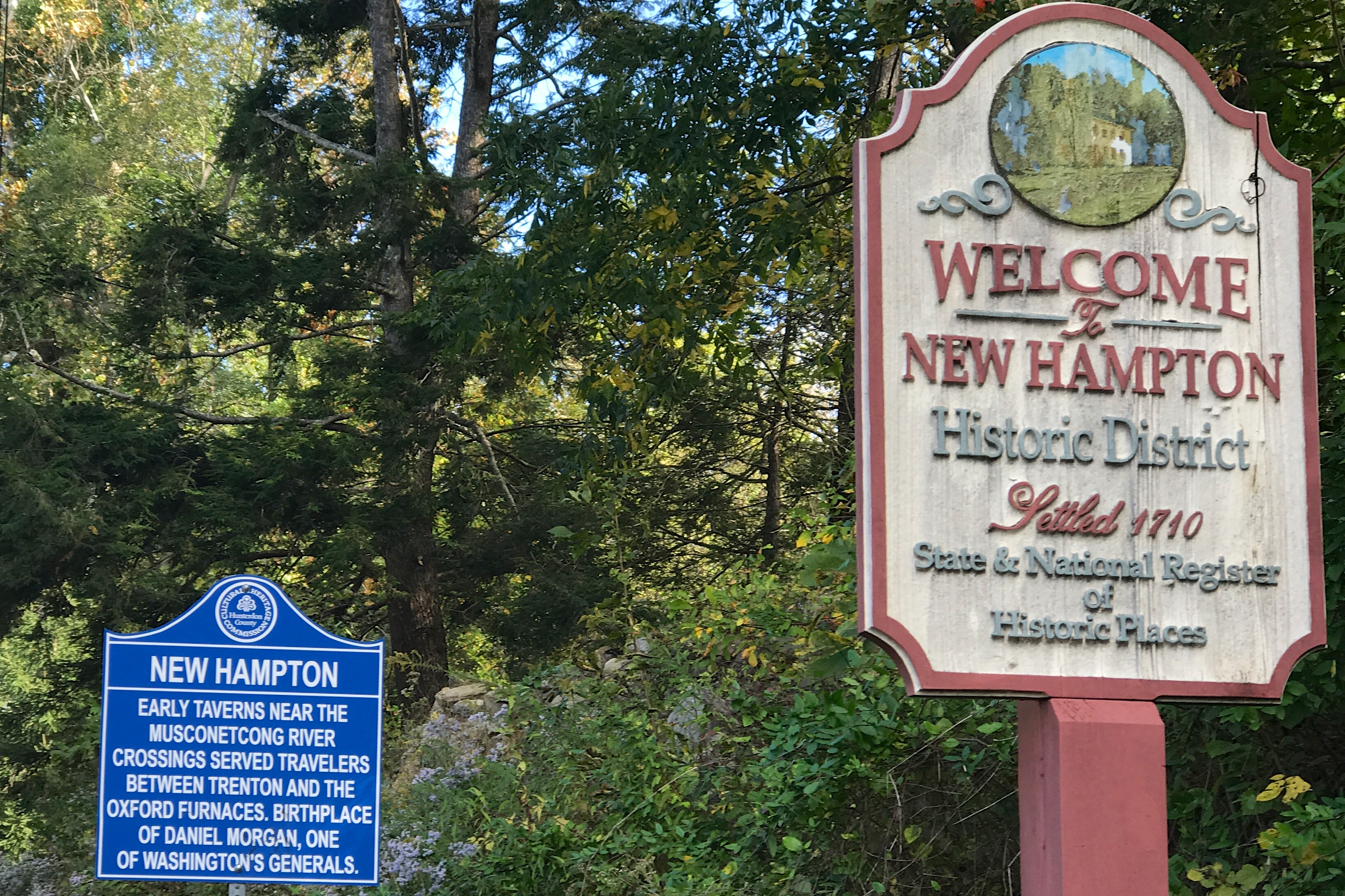
Welcome to New Hampton Historic District

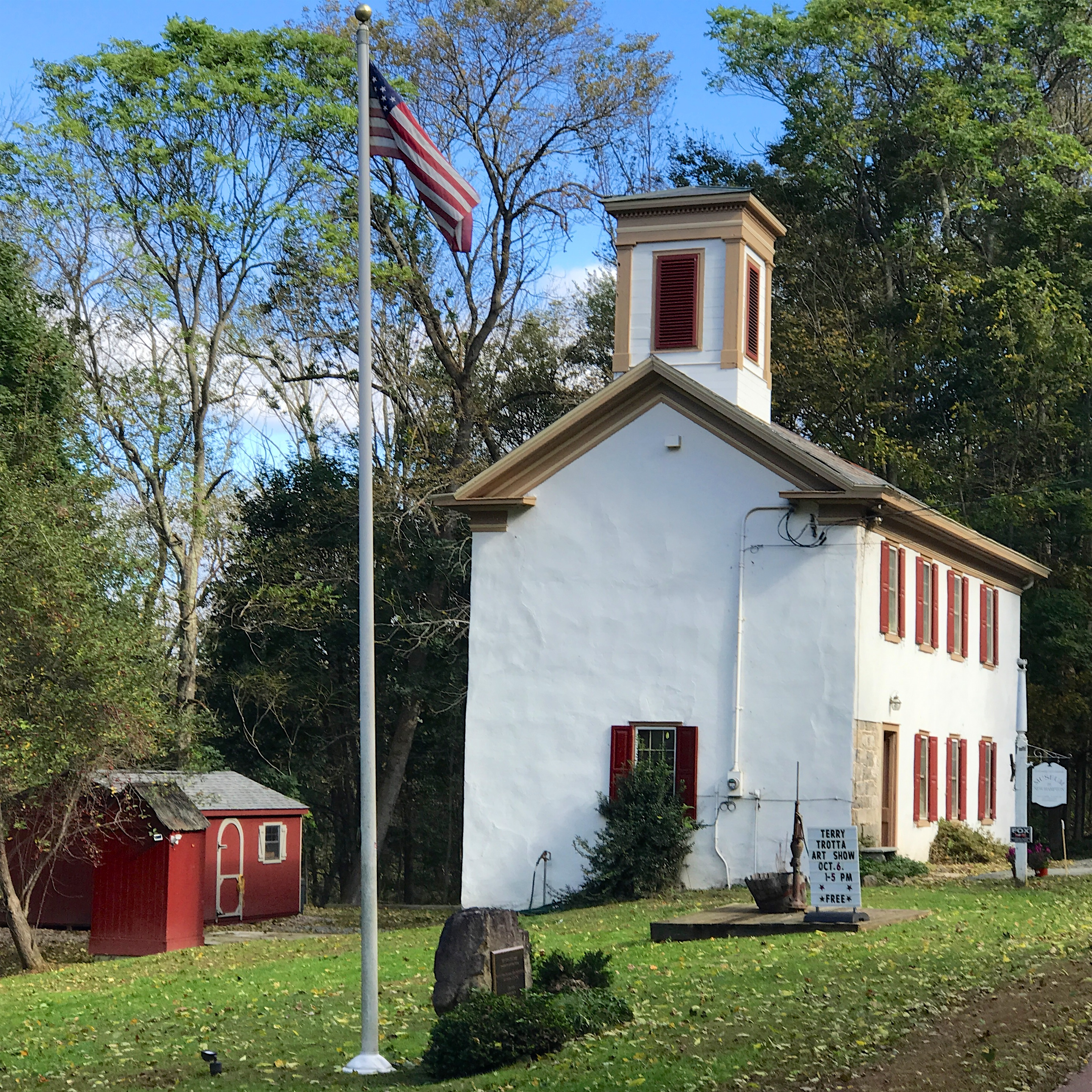
The Lebanon Township Museum, c. 1825 schoolhouse

== Notable people ==
People who were born in, residents of, or otherwise closely associated with New Hampton include:

- Wilson Bowlby (1818–1895), doctor and politician who served as the President of the Oregon State Senate in 1862
- James M. J. Sanno, U.S. Army brigadier general who was born and raised in New Hampton
