= List of Historic Civil Engineering Landmarks =

The following is a list of Historic Civil Engineering Landmarks as designated by the American Society of Civil Engineers since it began the program in 1964. The designation is granted to projects, structures, and sites in the United States (National Historic Civil Engineering Landmarks) and the rest of the world (International Historic Civil Engineering Landmarks).

As of 2024, there are 235 designated Historic Civil Engineering Landmarks in the United States and 61 internationally, totaling 296 landmarks worldwide. Sections or chapters of the American Society of Civil Engineers may also designate state or local landmarks within their areas; those landmarks are not listed here.

Ref#	Year designated	Name	Image	Built	Location Coordinates	Region/state	Country	Category
1	1966	Bollman Truss Bridge		1869	Savage; 39°8′5.4″N 76°49′30.3″W	Maryland	United States	bridges
2	1967	Bidwell Bar Bridge		1856	Oroville; 39°32′14.8″N 121°27′15.6″W	California	United States	bridges
3	1967	Erie Canal		1825	Hudson River to Lake Erie; 43°2′35.6″N 76°1′20.2″W	New York	United States	water transportation
4	1967	Middlesex Canal		1803	Middlesex County; 42°30′21.4″N 71°9′25.8″W	Massachusetts	United States	water transportation
5	1968	Central Pacific Railroad		1863–1869	Sacramento eastward 38°34′57″N 121°30′22.8″W	California	United States	roads & rails
6	1968	Durango-Silverton Branch of the D&RGW RR		1882	Durango; 37°35′27.7″N 107°46′41.6″W	Colorado	United States	roads & rails
7	1968	Ellicott's Stone		1799	Mobile; 30°59′52″N 88°1′21.1″W	Alabama	United States	surveys & maps
8	1968	Acequias of San Antonio		1718	San Antonio; 29°19′57.1″N 98°27′41.1″W	Texas	United States	water supply & control
9	1968	Joining of the Rails - Transcontinental Railroad		1869	Promontory; 41°37′4.7″N 112°33′5.8″W	Utah	United States	roads & rails
10	1968	Wheeling Suspension Bridge		1849	Wheeling; 40°4′12.8″N 80°43′36.7″W	West Virginia	United States	bridges
11	1969	Alvord Lake Bridge		1889	San Francisco; 37°46′8.4″N 122°27′17.6″W	California	United States	bridges
12	1969	Charleston - Hamburg Railroad		1833	Charleston to Hamburg; 32°47′22.9″N 79°56′15.8″W	South Carolina	United States	roads & rails
13	1970	Ascutney Mill Dam		1834	Windsor; 43°28′35″N 72°23′44.5″W	Vermont	United States	dams
14	1970	Bridgeport Covered Bridge		1862	Nevada County; 39°17′34.2″N 121°11′41.7″W	California	United States	bridges
15	1970	Cornish–Windsor Covered Bridge		1866, rebuilt 1988	Windsor to Cornish; 43°28′25.3″N 72°23′2.1″W	Vermont and New Hampshire	United States	bridges
16	1970	Frankford Avenue Bridge		1697	Philadelphia; 40°2′36.7″N 75°1′14″W	Pennsylvania	United States	bridges
17	1970	Potowmack Canal and Locks		1799	Great Falls; 38°59′25.3″N 77°14′58.1″W	Virginia	United States	water transportation
18	1970	Theodore Roosevelt Dam & Salt River Project		1911	33°40′17.9″N 111°9′40.8″W	Arizona	United States	water supply & control
19	1970	Union Canal Tunnel		1828	Lebanon; 40°20′58.5″N 76°27′41″W	Pennsylvania	United States	water transportation
20	1971	Bethlehem Waterworks		1761	Bethlehem; 40°37′8.7″N 75°22′58.2″W	Pennsylvania	United States	water supply & control
21	1971	Druid Lake Dam		1871	Baltimore; 39°19′7″N 76°37′53″W	Maryland	United States	dams
22	1971	Eads Bridge		1874	St. Louis; 38°37′44″N 90°10′43.3″W	Missouri	United States	bridges
23	1971	First Owens River - Los Angeles Aqueduct		1913	Owens Valley; 36°58′32.4″N 118°12′38″W	California	United States	water supply & control
24	1971	Mormon Tabernacle		1867	Salt Lake City; 40°46′13.6″N 111°53′35.3″W	Utah	United States	buildings
25	1972	Cabin John Aqueduct		1863	Cabin John; 38°58′22″N 77°8′54.9″W	Maryland	United States	water supply & control
26	1972	Chesbroughs Water Supply System Chicago		1869	Chicago; 41°53′49.8″N 87°37′27.9″W	Illinois	United States	water supply & control
27	1972	Brooklyn Bridge		1883	New York City; 40°42′22″N 73°59′48.8″W	New York	United States	bridges
28	1972	Gunnison Tunnel		1909	Montrose; 38°29′36″N 107°43′17″W	Colorado	United States	tunnels
29	1972	Roebling's Delaware Aqueduct of the Delaware & Hudson Canal		1848, restored 1983	Lackawaxen to Minisink Ford; 41°28′57.5″N 74°59′4.1″W	Pennsylvania & New York	United States	water transportation
30	1972	Miami Conservancy District		1922	near Dayton; 39°45′49.2″N 84°11′29.2″W	Ohio	United States	water supply & control
31	1973	Buffalo Bill Dam		1910	Cody; 44°30′5.3″N 109°10′59.4″W	Wyoming	United States	dams
32	1973	Cheesman Reservoir		1905	Southwest of Denver; 39°12′27″N 105°16′20.1″W	Colorado	United States	dams
33	1973	Embudo Stream Gauging Station		1889	Embudo; 36°12′18.4″N 105°57′49.2″W	New Mexico	United States	water supply & control
34	1973	Ingalls Building		1903	Cincinnati; 39°6′1″N 84°30′45.1″W	Ohio	United States	buildings
35	1973	Pelton Impulse Water Wheel		1878	Camptonville; 39°27′7″N 121°2′55″W	California	United States	power generation
36	1973	Starrucca Viaduct		1848	Lanesboro; 41°57′51.3″N 75°35′0.6″W	Pennsylvania	United States	bridges
37	1974	Kansas City Park and Boulevard System		1893 to 1915	Kansas City; 39°4′57″N 94°33′18″W	Missouri	United States	surveys & maps
38	1974	Milwaukee Metropolitan Sewage Treatment Plant, home of Milorganite		1919	Milwaukee; 43°1′21.3″N 87°53′57.3″W	Wisconsin	United States	water supply & control
39	1974	Philadelphia Municipal Water Supply		1801	Philadelphia; 39°57′56″N 75°10′51″W	Pennsylvania	United States	water supply & control
40	1974	Stone Arch Bridge		1883	Minneapolis; 44°58′50.8″N 93°15′12.3″W	Minnesota	United States	bridges
41	1975	Castillo de San Marcos		1695	St. Augustine; 29°53′52″N 81°18′41″W	Florida	United States	buildings
42	1975	Croton Water Supply System		1842	New York City; 41°0′42.5″N 73°52′36.4″W	New York	United States	water supply & control
43	1975	Folsom Hydroelectric Power System		1895	Folsom; 38°40′46.6″N 121°10′37.2″W	California	United States	power generation
44	1975	Granite Railway		1826	Quincy; 42°14′44.6″N 71°2′9″W	Massachusetts	United States	roads & rails
45	1975	Hoosac Tunnel		1875	Berkshire County; 42°40′31.1″N 73°2′45.1″W	Massachusetts	United States	tunnels
46	1975	Lawrence Experiment Station		1886	Lawrence; 42°41′53.8″N 71°9′55.7″W	Massachusetts	United States	research & educational
47	1975	Marlette Lake Water System		1873 to 1887	Virginia City; 39°13′9.5″N 119°47′20.1″W	Nevada	United States	water supply & control
48	1975	Mount Washington Cog Railway		1869	Mount Washington; 44°16′26″N 71°19′55″W	New Hampshire	United States	roads & rails
49	1975	Smithfield Street Bridge		1883	Pittsburgh; 40°26′5.4″N 80°0′7.7″W	Pennsylvania	United States	bridges
50	1975	Tunkhannock Viaduct		1915	Nicholson; 41°37′34.2″N 75°46′34.4″W	Pennsylvania	United States	bridges
51	1976	Crozet's Blue Ridge Tunnel		1858	Waynesboro; 38°2′3.1″N 78°51′28.4″W	Virginia	United States	tunnels
52	1976	Cumbres and Toltec Scenic Railroad		1880	Chama to Antonito; 36°59′42″N 106°17′51.1″W	New Mexico and Colorado	United States	roads & rails
53	1976	Elephant Butte Dam		1916	Truth or Consequences; 33°9′14.9″N 107°11′31.3″W	New Mexico	United States	dams
54	1976	First Concrete Pavement		1893	Bellefontaine; 40°21′37.5″N 83°45′33.6″W	Ohio	United States	roads & rails
55	1976	International Boundary Marker No. 1		1855	Doña Ana County; 31°47′2″N 106°31′47.1″W	New Mexico	United States	surveys & maps
56	1976	King's Road		1766 to 1775	New Smyrna; 29°38′23.4″N 81°16′50.3″W	Florida	United States	roads & rails
57	1976	National Road		1811–1839	Cumberland to Vandalia; 39°57′38.7″N 82°27′2″W	Maryland to Illinois	United States	roads & rails
58	1977	Charlestown Naval Dry Dock		1833	Boston; 42°22′23.7″N 71°3′19.3″W	Massachusetts	United States	water transportation
59	1977	City Plan of Savannah		1733	Savannah; 32°4′32″N 81°5′31″W	Georgia	United States	surveys & maps
60	1977	Great Falls Raceway and Power System		1800	Paterson; 40°54′55.1″N 74°10′52.1″W	New Jersey	United States	power generation
61	1977	First New York Subway		1904	New York City; 40°42′45.3″N 74°0′24.2″W	New York	United States	roads & rails
62	1977	Mason–Dixon line		1767	39°43′16.1″N 80°7′5.3″W	Maryland & Pennsylvania	United States	surveys & maps
63	1977	Minot's Ledge Lighthouse		1860	off Scituate; 42°16′11″N 70°45′32.9″W	Massachusetts	United States	water transportation
64	1977	Mullan Road		1862	Walla Walla; 46°46′8.3″N 118°12′22.6″W	Washington	United States	roads & rails
65	1977	Dry Dock No 1 Norfolk Naval Shipyard		1833	Portsmouth; 36°49′14″N 76°17′35″W	Virginia	United States	water transportation
66	1977	Reversal of the Chicago River		1900	Chicago; 41°42′18″N 87°56′2″W	Illinois	United States	water transportation
67	1977	Vulcan Street Plant		1882	Appleton; 44°15′29.2″N 88°23′50.2″W	Wisconsin	United States	power generation
68	1977	William E. Ward House		1876	Rye Brook; 41°1′32.5″N 73°40′3.1″W	New York	United States	buildings
69	1978	Boston Subway		1897	Boston; 42°21′23.8″N 71°3′43.6″W	Massachusetts	United States	roads & rails
70	1978	Dunlap's Creek Bridge		1839	Brownsville; 40°1′17.2″N 79°53′17.2″W	Pennsylvania	United States	bridges
71	1978	Hudson and Manhattan Railroad Tunnel		1908	Jersey City to New York City; 40°43′56.7″N 74°1′11.6″W	New Jersey & New York	United States	tunnels
72	1978	Newark International Airport		1928	Newark; 40°41′22.2″N 74°10′28.2″W	New Jersey	United States	aviation
73	1978	United States Military Academy		1813	West Point; 41°23′34.8″N 73°57′28.8″W	New York	United States	research & educational
74	1979	Cleveland Hopkins Airport		1925	Cleveland; 41°24′45″N 81°50′53″W	Ohio	United States	aviation
75	1979	Fink Deck Truss Bridge		1870	Lynchburg; 37°26′24.3″N 79°9′56″W	Virginia	United States	bridges
76	1979	Fink Through Truss Bridge		1858	Hamden; 40°36′14.3″N 74°54′8.1″W	New Jersey	United States	bridges
77	1979	Iron Bridge		1779	Ironbridge; 52°37′38.4″N 2°29′7.6″W	West Midlands	England	bridges
78	1979	Moffat Tunnel		1928	Winter Park; 39°53′37.5″N 105°42′41.3″W	Colorado	United States	tunnels
79	1979	Rockville Bridge		1902	Harrisburg; 40°19′59.9″N 76°54′38.8″W	Pennsylvania	United States	bridges
80	1980	Goodyear Airdock		1929	Akron; 41°1′54.9″N 81°28′14.6″W	Ohio	United States	aviation
81	1980	Hydraulic-Inclined Plane System of the Morris Canal		1831	Waterloo Village; 40°54′55.2″N 74°21′23.8″W	New Jersey	United States	water transportation
82	1981	Borden Base Line		1831	Hatfield; 42°25′33.7″N 72°37′9″W	Massachusetts	United States	surveys & maps
83	1981	Chain of Rocks Water Purification Plant		1904	St. Louis; 38°45′18.5″N 90°11′11.6″W	Missouri	United States	water supply & control
84	1981	Charles River Basin Project		1910	Boston; 42°22′3.8″N 71°4′12.8″W	Massachusetts	United States	water supply & control
85	1981	Cortland Street Drawbridge		1902	Chicago; 41°55′1.1″N 87°39′51.4″W	Illinois	United States	bridges
86	1981	George Washington Bridge		1931	Fort Lee to New York City; 40°51′6.1″N 73°57′9.7″W	New Jersey & New York	United States	bridges
87	1981	Louisville Water Works		1875 to 1896	Louisville; 38°16′50″N 85°42′4.3″W	Kentucky	United States	water supply & control
88	1981	Montgomery Bell's Tunnel		1818	Cheatham County; 36°8′48.5″N 87°7′19.3″W	Tennessee	United States	tunnels
89	1981	Snoqualmie Falls Cavity Generating Station		1899	Snoqualmie; 47°32′39.5″N 121°50′29.3″W	Washington	United States	power generation
90	1981	Union Station		1894	St. Louis; 38°37′41.2″N 90°12′28.8″W	Missouri	United States	roads & rails
91	1981	Washington Monument		1885	Washington; 38°53′22.1″N 77°2′6.9″W	District of Columbia	United States	buildings
92	1981	Whipple Truss Bridge		1855	Schenectady; 42°49′5.2″N 73°55′27″W	New York	United States	bridges
93	1982	Carrollton Viaduct		1829	Baltimore; 39°16′31.5″N 76°39′18″W	Maryland	United States	bridges
94	1982	Detroit-Windsor Tunnel		1930	Detroit; 42°19′28″N 83°2′25.4″W	Michigan	United States	tunnels
95	1982	Eads South Pass Navigation Works		1879	Port Eads; 28°59′50″N 89°8′38″W	Louisiana	United States	water transportation
96	1982	Holland Tunnel		1927	Jersey City to New York City; 40°43′38.9″N 74°1′16″W	New Jersey & New York	United States	tunnels
97	1982	John A. Roebling Suspension Bridge		1866	Cincinnati; 39°5′34.8″N 84°30′35.6″W	Ohio	United States	bridges
98	1982	Kinzua Railway Viaduct		1882	McKean County; 41°45′47.3″N 78°35′21.1″W	Pennsylvania	United States	bridges
99	1982	Rogue River Bridge		1931	Gold Beach; 42°25′40.5″N 124°24′47.5″W	Oregon	United States	bridges
100	1982	Second Street Bridge		1886	Allegan; 42°31′32.7″N 85°50′54.6″W	Michigan	United States	bridges
101	1982	Watertown Arsenal		1859	Watertown; 42°21′44″N 71°9′58″W	Massachusetts	United States	research & educational
102	1983	Atlantic City Convention Hall		1929	Atlantic City; 39°21′18″N 74°26′19.1″W	New Jersey	United States	buildings
103	1983	Bailey Island Bridge		1928	Harpswell; 43°44′57.1″N 69°59′19.3″W	Maine	United States	bridges
104	1983	Blenheim Bridge		1855	North Blenheim; 42°28′18.4″N 74°26′29.4″W	New York	United States	bridges
105	1983	Iron Building of the U.S. Army Arsenal		1859	Watervliet; 42°43′5.9″N 73°42′14.5″W	New York	United States	buildings
106	1983	Ohio Canal System		1848	Akron; 40°52′39.2″N 81°35′1.4″W	Ohio	United States	water transportation
107	1983	Peavey–Haglin Experimental Concrete Grain Elevator		1900	St. Louis Park; 44°56′32.7″N 93°20′42.8″W	Minnesota	United States	buildings
108	1983	Sault Ste. Marie Hydroelectric Complex		1902	Sault Ste. Marie; 46°29′50.8″N 84°19′55.7″W	Michigan	United States	power generation
109	1983	Zuiderzee Enclosure Dam (Afsluitdijk)		1927 to 1932	Den Oever to Zurich; 52°59′37.5″N 5°9′19.1″E	North Holland and Friesland	Netherlands	water supply & control
110	1984	Columbia River Scenic Highway		1922	Portland; 45°39′19.3″N 121°54′13.2″W	Oregon	United States	roads & rails
111	1984	Columbia-Wrightsville Bridge		1930	Columbia; 40°1′42.4″N 76°31′5.6″W	Pennsylvania	United States	bridges
112	1984	Golden Gate Bridge		1937	San Francisco; 37°49′11.7″N 122°28′42.7″W	California	United States	bridges
113	1984	Hoover Dam		1935	Boulder City; 36°0′57.7″N 114°44′14.8″W	Nevada & Arizona	United States	dams
114	1984	Lowell Waterpower System		1821	Lowell; 42°38′48.5″N 71°18′41.6″W	Massachusetts	United States	power generation
115	1984	Panama Canal		1914	Colón to Panama City9°7′2.2″N 79°43′7.6″W		Panama	water transportation
116	1984	Rocky River Pumped Storage Hydro-Plant		1925	New Milford; 41°34′49.7″N 73°26′13.2″W	Connecticut	United States	power generation
117	1985	Bayonne Bridge		1931	Bayonne to Staten Island; 40°38′29.8″N 74°8′31.6″W	New Jersey & New York	United States	bridges
118	1985	Beginning Point of the U.S. Public Land Survey		1785	Liverpool; 40°38′19.7″N 80°31′8.4″W	Ohio	United States	surveys & maps
119	1985	Cape Cod Canal		1914	Barnstable County; 41°45′51.1″N 70°34′6.3″W	Massachusetts	United States	water transportation
120	1985	Chesapeake and Delaware Canal		1828 (rebuilt 1927)	New Castle; 39°32′34″N 75°43′14″W	Delaware	United States	water transportation
121	1985	Davis Island Lock and Dam		1885	Pittsburgh; 40°29′35″N 80°3′56″W	Pennsylvania	United States	water transportation
122	1985	Forth Railway Bridge		1890	North Queensferry to South Queensferry; 56°0′1.5″N 3°23′19.4″W		Scotland	bridges
123	1985	Going-to-the-Sun Road		1932	Glacier National Park; 48°41′42″N 113°49′1.2″W	Montana	United States	roads & rails
124	1985	High Bridge		1877	Jessamine & Mercer Counties; 37°49′1.7″N 84°43′12.4″W	Kentucky	United States	bridges
125	1985	Statue of Liberty		1886	New York Harbor; 40°41′21.5″N 74°2′40.4″W	New York	United States	buildings
126	1986	White River Concrete Arch Bridge		1930	Cotter; 36°16′2″N 92°32′39″W	Arkansas	United States	bridges
127	1986	Cranetown Triangulation Site		1817	Cedar Grove; 40°49′43.9″N 74°13′27.1″W	New Jersey	United States	surveys & maps
128	1986	Eiffel Tower		1889	Paris; 48°51′30.2″N 2°17′40.2″E	Île-de-France	France	buildings
129	1986	El Camino Real		1598–1800s	Santa Fe and Mexico City; 34°3′38.7″N 106°53′36.6″W	New Mexico	United States and Mexico	roads & rails
130	1986	El Camino Real (The Royal Road) Eastern Branch		16th century	San Antonio; 29°26′45.8″N 98°30′12.3″W	Texas	United States	roads & rails
131	1986	New Castle Ice Harbor		1803	New Castle; 39°39′28″N 75°33′39″W	Delaware	United States	water transportation
132	1986	Norris Dam		1936	Knoxville; 36°13′28″N 84°5′31.5″W	Tennessee	United States	dams
133	1986	San Francisco–Oakland Bay Bridge		1937	San Francisco to Oakland; 37°47′53.6″N 122°22′40.7″W	California	United States	bridges
134	1986	Sewall's Bridge		1761 (rebuilt 1934)	York; 43°8′10.2″N 70°39′38.3″W	Maine	United States	bridges
135	1986	Triborough Bridge Project		1936	New York City; 40°47′26.6″N 73°55′33.2″W	New York	United States	bridges
136	1986	U.S. Army Corps of Engineers Waterways Exp. Station		1929	Vicksburg; 32°18′4.2″N 90°52′18″W	Mississippi	United States	research & educational
137	1986	U.S. Capitol		1793, rebuilt 1863	Washington; 38°53′23″N 77°0′33″W	District of Columbia	United States	buildings
138	1987	Allegheny Portage Railroad		1834	Hollidaysburg; 40°27′23″N 78°33′3.4″W	Pennsylvania	United States	roads & rails
139	1987	Bonneville Dam, Columbia River System		1937	Bonneville; 45°38′39.7″N 121°56′26.7″W	Oregon	United States	power generation
140	1987	Bridges of Keeseville		1843, 1878, 1888	Keeseville; 44°30′13.2″N 73°28′57.3″W	New York	United States	bridges
141	1987	Dismal Swamp Canal		1805	Chesapeake to South Mills; 36°35′34.1″N 76°23′5.4″W	Virginia to North Carolina	United States	water transportation
142	1987	Houston Ship Channel		1837–present	Houston; 29°44′35.8″N 95°6′16.5″W	Texas	United States	water transportation
143	1987	Kamehameha V Post Office		1871	Honolulu; 21°18′34.6″N 157°51′47.4″W	Hawaii	United States	buildings
144	1987	Frisco Bridge		1892	Memphis; 35°7′43.6″N 90°4′34.7″W	Tennessee & Arkansas	United States	bridges
145	1987	Quebec Bridge		1917	Quebec City; 46°44′45.6″N 71°17′17.3″W	Quebec	Canada	bridges
146	1988	Belle Fourche Dam		1911	Belle Fourche; 44°43′51.3″N 103°40′36.8″W	South Dakota	United States	dams
147	1988	École Nationale des Ponts et Chaussées		1747	Paris; 48°51′20.9″N 2°19′49.9″E	Île-de-France	France	research & educational
148	1988	Keokuk Hydro-Power System		1913	Keokuk; 40°23′56.6″N 91°21′49″W	Iowa	United States	power generation
149	1988	Portion of the Pennsylvania Turnpike between the Irwin Interchange and Carlsie Interchange		1940/11964/1968	40°1′49.9″N 78°29′33.6″W	Pennsylvania	United States	roads & rails
150	1988	River des Peres Sewerage & Drainage Works		1924 to 1931	St. Louis; 38°39′42.3″N 90°18′33.9″W	Missouri	United States	water supply & control
151	1988	Sydney Harbour Bridge		1932	Sydney; 33°51′8.1″S 151°12′38.6″E	New South Wales	Australia	bridges
152	1989	Royal Colonial Boundary of 1665		1728–1819	Middlesboro; 36°36′2.9″N 83°40′31.5″W	Kentucky	United States	surveys & maps
153	1989	Zhaozhou Bridge		605 AD	Zhaoxian; 37°43′12.9″N 114°45′47.7″E	Hebei	China	bridges
154	1990	Fort Peck Dam		1940	Fort Peck; 48°0′10.1″N 106°24′58″W	Montana	United States	dams
155	1990	Maria Pia Bridge		1877	Oporto; 41°8′23.4″N 8°35′49.6″W	Norte	Portugal	bridges
156	1990	Salginatobel Bridge		1930	Grisons; 46°58′54.4″N 9°43′5.1″E	Graubünden	Switzerland	bridges
157	1991	Eddystone Lighthouse		1882	off Plymouth; 50°11′2″N 4°16′5.1″W		England	water transportation
158	1991	Fritz Engineering Laboratory		1910	Bethlehem; 40°36′28.9″N 75°22′34.3″W	Pennsylvania	United States	research & educational
159	1991	St. Clair Tunnel		1891	Port Huron; 42°57′32.4″N 82°25′22.2″W	Michigan	United States	tunnels
160	1991	Thames Tunnel		1843	London; 51°30′12.7″N 0°3′13.3″W		England	tunnels
161	1992	Acquedotto Traiano-Paolo		110 AD	Rome; 42°3′12.9″N 12°20′18.7″E	Lazio	Italy	water supply & control
162	1992	Bridges of Niagara		1849, 1855, 1883, 1898, 1941	Niagara Gorge; 43°5′24.8″N 79°4′3.4″W	Ontario and New York	Canada and United States	bridges
163	1992	Duck Creek Aqueduct		1846	Metamora; 39°26′46.1″N 85°7′48″W	Indiana	United States	water supply & control
164	1992	Hohokam Canal System		600 – 1450 AD	Maricopa County; 33°26′43.8″N 111°48′56.2″W	Arizona	United States	water supply & control
165	1992	San Jacinto Monument		1939	Houston; 29°44′59.5″N 95°4′50.6″W	Texas	United States	buildings
166	1993	Blimp Hangars		1942	Tustin; 33°42′10.8″N 117°49′26.3″W	California	United States	aviation
167	1993	Denison Dam		1943	Denison; 33°49′52.6″N 96°34′16″W	Texas & Oklahoma	United States	dams
168	1993	Hanford B Reactor		1944	Richland; 46°37′49.1″N 119°38′50.3″W	Washington	United States	power generation
169	1993	Stevens Pass Railroad Tunnels & Switchback System		1900	Stevens Pass; 47°44′52.4″N 121°7′26.3″W	Washington	United States	tunnels
170	1994	Colorado River Aqueduct		1933–1941	Blythe; 34°17′23.6″N 114°10′19.5″W	California	United States	water supply & control
171	1994	Kavanagh Building		1936	Buenos Aires; 34°35′43.7″S 58°22′28.9″W		Argentina	buildings
172	1994	Missouri River Bridges		1926	Chamberlain; 43°48′42.1″N 99°20′16.1″W	South Dakota	United States	bridges
173	1995	Red Hill Underground Fuel Storage Facility		1943	Honolulu; 21°22′18″N 157°53′44″W	Hawaii	United States	tunnels
174	1994	Viaducto del Malleco		1890	Malleco River; 37°57′47″S 72°26′20″W	Central Chile	Chile	bridges
175	1994	White Pass and Yukon Route		1900	Whitehorse, Yukon to Skagway, Alaska; 59°37′28″N 135°8′18.3″W	Yukon Territory to Alaska	Canada & United States	roads & rails
176	1995	Alaska Highway		1942	Dawson Creek to Delta Junction; 59°54′39.6″N 131°33′20.6″W	British Columbia to Alaska	Canada & United States	roads & rails
177	1995	Banaue Rice Terraces		100 BC	Banaue; 16°55′57.4″N 121°3′30.1″E	Ifugao	Philippines	water supply & control
178	1995	Acueducto de Queretaro		1738	Querétaro; 20°35′48″N 100°22′20.6″W		Mexico	water supply & control
179	1995	Victoria Falls Bridge		1905	Zambezi River; 17°55′41.7″S 25°51′26.1″E		Zimbabwe & Zambia	bridges
180	1996	Armour-Swift-Burlington Bridge		1912	Kansas City; 39°7′0″N 94°34′47.5″W	Missouri	United States	bridges
181	1996	Dublin-Belfast railway line		1839	Dublin to Belfast; 53°43′0″N 6°20′15″W		Ireland & Northern Ireland	roads & rails
182	1996	Kentucky Dam		1944	Gilbertsville; 37°0′46.4″N 88°16′10.1″W	Kentucky	United States	dams
183	1996	Lake Moeris Quarry Road		2575–2137 BC	Lake Moeris; 29°37′24.2″N 30°38′40.4″E		Egypt	roads & rails
184	1996	City Plan of Philadelphia		1682	Philadelphia; 39°57′28.6″N 75°10′14.2″W	Pennsylvania	United States	surveys & maps
185	1996	San Antonio River Walk & Flood Control System		1929 to 1941	San Antonio; 29°25′30.7″N 98°29′29.7″W	Texas	United States	water control & supply
186	1997	Grand Coulee Dam		1941	Grand Coulee; 47°57′23.8″N 118°58′51.6″W	Washington	United States	dams
187	1997	Lake Washington Ship Canal & Hiram M. Chittenden Locks		1917	Seattle; 47°39′55.7″N 122°23′49.6″W	Washington	United States	water transportation
188	1997	Navajo Bridge		1929	Page; 36°49′3.4″N 111°37′52.3″W	Arizona	United States	bridges
189	1997	North Island Main Trunk Railway		1885–1908	Auckland to Wellington; 39°13′39.8″S 175°23′55.5″E	North Island	New Zealand	roads & rails
190	1997	Northampton Street Bridge		1896	Easton to Phillipsburg; 40°41′29.3″N 75°12′14.4″W	Pennsylvania & New Jersey	United States	bridges
191	1997	Snowy Mountains Scheme		1974	Snowy Mountains; 35°36′40.1″S 148°17′29.8″E	New South Wales	Australia	power generation
192	1997	Texas Commerce Bank Building (formerly Gulf, now Chase)		1929	Houston; 29°45′32″N 95°21′49.7″W	Texas	United States	buildings
193	1997	Walnut Street Bridge		1890	Harrisburg; 40°15′27.1″N 76°53′9.8″W	Pennsylvania	United States	bridges
194	1998	Brooks AFB, Old Hangar 9		1918	San Antonio; 29°20′38.5″N 98°26′38.9″W	Texas	United States	aviation
195	1998	Canton Viaduct		1835	Canton; 42°9′28.8″N 71°9′14.5″W	Massachusetts	United States	bridges
196	1998	Göta Canal		1810 to 1832	Gothenburg; 58°29′53.9″N 16°10′28.9″E	Västra Götaland	Sweden	water transportation
197	1998	Moseley Wrought Iron Arch Bridge		1864	North Andover; 42°40′8.6″N 71°7′21.3″W	Massachusetts	United States	bridges
198	1998	Tehachapi Pass Railroad Line		1876	Kern County; 35°12′3″N 118°32′13″W	California	United States	roads & rails
199	1999	Acueducto de Segovia		50 AD	Segovia; 40°56′52.7″N 4°7′4.3″W	Castile and León	Spain	water supply & control
200	1999	Arroyo Seco Parkway		1940	Los Angeles; 34°4′23″N 118°14′2″W	California	United States	roads & rails
201	1999	Blue Ridge Parkway		1935–1987	Shenandoah NP to Great Smoky Mountains NP; 36°26′28.5″N 81°5′42.9″W	Virginia to North Carolina	United States	roads & rails
202	1999	Cape Hatteras Lighthouse		1870	Cape Hatteras; 35°15′2″N 75°31′43.7″W	North Carolina	United States	water transportation
203	1999	Maine Turnpike		1947	43°21′17.2″N 70°35′26.2″W	Maine	United States	roads & rails
204	1999	McNeill Street Pumping Station		1887	Shreveport; 32°31′3.8″N 93°45′25.9″W	Louisiana	United States	water supply & control
205	2000	Cedar Falls Hydroelectric Project		1901	Seattle; 47°25′9.2″N 121°46′54.4″W	Washington	United States	power generation
206	2000	Forth and Clyde Canal and Union Canal		1790	55°56′18″N 4°9′18.8″W		Scotland	water transportation
207	2000	Hagia Sophia		537 AD	Istanbul; 41°0′31.2″N 28°58′48.6″E	Istanbul	Turkey	buildings
208	2000	Muskingum River Navigation System		1837	Zanesville; 39°43′59.5″N 81°54′29.4″W	Ohio	United States	water transportation
209	2000	Seventh Street Improvement Arches		1909	St. Paul; 44°57′23″N 93°4′38″W	Minnesota	United States	bridges
210	2000	West Baden Springs Hotel		1902	West Baden Springs; 38°34′1.3″N 86°37′6.6″W	Indiana	United States	buildings
211	2001	Bunker Hill Covered Bridge		1895, rebuilt 1994	Claremont; 35°43′17.5″N 81°6′54.8″W	North Carolina	United States	bridges
212	2001	Galveston Seawall and Grade Raising		1904 (expanded through 1963)	Galveston; 29°18′9″N 94°46′27″W	Texas	United States	water supply & control
213	2001	Baltimore & Ohio Roundhouse & Shop Complex		1842 to 1850s	Martinsburg; 39°27′33″N 77°57′36″W	West Virginia	United States	buildings
214	2002	Conwy Suspension Bridge		1826	Conwy; 53°16′49.7″N 3°49′25.6″W	Conwy	Wales	bridges
215	2002	Conwy Tubular Bridge		1849	Conwy; 53°16′49″N 3°49′25″W	Conwy	Wales	bridges
216	2002	Dorton Arena		1952	Raleigh; 35°47′38.4″N 78°42′37.3″W	North Carolina	United States	buildings
217	2002	East Maui Irrigation System		1876 to 1923	East Maui; 20°52′0″N 156°13′0″W	Hawaii	United States	water supply & control
218	2002	Five Stone Arch Bridges		1830 to 1866	Hillsborough; 43°7′49″N 71°56′41.1″W	New Hampshire	United States	bridges
219	2002	Louisville and Portland Canal Locks & Dam		1830, rebuilt 1962	Louisville; 38°16′18.5″N 85°46′45.6″W	Kentucky	United States	water transportation
220	2002	Marshall Building		1906	Milwaukee; 43°2′0.9″N 87°54′31.2″W	Wisconsin	United States	buildings
221	2002	Menai Suspension Bridge		1826	Anglesey; 53°13′13.1″N 4°9′48.1″W		Wales	bridges
222	2002	Old Cape Henry Light,		1792, replaced 1881	Virginia Beach; 36°55′32.8″N 76°0′29.3″W	Virginia	United States	water transportation
223	2002	Portland Head Light		1787	Cape Elizabeth; 43°37′23.2″N 70°12′28.4″W	Maine	United States	water transportation
224	2002	Shannon Hydroelectric Scheme		1929	52°42′20″N 8°36′46″W		Ireland	power generation
225	2002	Waldo-Hancock Suspension Bridge		1931	Bucksport; 44°33′37.6″N 68°48′5.9″W	Maine	United States	bridges
226	2003	Horseshoe Curve		1854	Altoona; 40°29′54″N 78°29′9.1″W	Pennsylvania	United States	roads & rails
227	2003	Suez Canal		1869	Port Said to Suez; 30°42′18″N 32°20′39″E		Egypt	water transportation
228	2003	Tennessee State Capitol		1845 to 1877	Nashville; 36°9′57.1″N 86°47′3.4″W	Tennessee	United States	buildings
229	2004	Hwaseong Fortress		1796	Suwon; 37°17′0″N 127°0′57.6″E	Gyeonggi-do	Republic of Korea	buildings
230	2004	Mesa Verde Reservoirs		750 to 1180 AD	Montezuma County; 37°14′26.3″N 108°30′16.7″W	Colorado	United States	water supply & control
231	2004	Northern Pacific High Line Bridge No 64		1908	Valley City; 46°56′18.9″N 97°59′26.9″W	North Dakota	United States	bridges
232	2004	Old Wisla Bridge			Tczew; 54°5′33.7″N 18°48′22.2″E	Vistula River	Poland	bridges
233	2005	Great Western Railway	Bristol Temple Meads Station	1838	51°37′16.2″N 1°21′26.8″W		England & Wales	roads & rails
234	2005	Philadelphia City Hall		1901	Philadelphia; 39°57′10.1″N 75°9′48.8″W	Pennsylvania	United States	buildings
235	2005	Sweetwater Dam		1888	Spring Valley; 32°41′29.8″N 117°0′29.2″W	California	United States	dams
236	2005	Stanley Hydraulics Laboratory at the University of Iowa		1919–present	Iowa City; 41°39′25.8″N 91°32′29″W	Iowa	United States	research & educational
237	2006	Machu Picchu		1460 AD	13°9′48″S 72°32′44″W		Peru	urban development
238	2006	Portland Observatory		1807	Portland; 43°39′55.4″N 70°14′53.7″W	Maine	United States	water transportation
239	2006	Tipon		1200 – 1534 AD	13°34′15″S 71°46′59″W		Peru	water supply & control
240	2007	Caledonian Canal		1822	Great Glen; 57°6′44.9″N 4°44′18.8″W		Scotland	water transportation
241	2007	Craigellachie Bridge Moray		1814	Strathspey; 57°29′28.8″N 3°11′38″W		Scotland	bridges
242	2008	Choate Bridge		1764	Ipswich; 42°40′46.1″N 70°50′13.6″W	Massachusetts	United States	bridges
243	2008	Goldfields Water Supply		1903	Kalgoorlie; 31°57′36″S 116°10′16.7″E	Western Australia	Australia	water supply & control
244	2008	Lacey V. Murrow Bridge and Mount Baker Ridge Tunnels		1940	King County; 47°35′23.2″N 122°16′44.3″W	Washington	United States	bridges
245	2008	Woodhead Dam	Woodhead Dam	1897	Cape Town; 33°58′38.2″S 18°24′7.9″E	Western Cape	South Africa	dams
246	2009	Guayabo Ceremonial Center		300 BC - AD 1400	Turrialba; 9°58′21.7″N 83°41′26.6″W	Turrialba	Costa Rica	civil engineering profession
247	2009	Vancouver's Mapping of the West Coast of North America		1791–1795	45°0′0″N 124°0′43″W		Canada, Mexico and United States	surveys & maps
248	2009	Poughkeepsie-Highland Bridge		1886–1888	Poughkeepsie; 41°42′38.5″N 73°56′41.1″W	New York	United States	bridges
249	2009	Manhattan Bridge		1909	New York City; 40°42′27″N 73°59′26.9″W	New York	United States	bridges
250	2009	Queensboro Bridge		1909	New York City; 40°45′24.2″N 73°57′15.1″W	New York	United States	bridges
251	2009	Williamsburg Bridge		1903	New York City; 40°42′49.2″N 73°58′20.5″W	New York	United States	bridges
252	2010	Mackinac Bridge		1958	Straits of Mackinac; 45°48′48.8″N 84°43′42″W	Michigan	United States	bridges
253	2010	Rensselaer Polytechnic Institute		1824	Troy; 42°43′48″N 73°40′39″W	New York	United States	research & educational
254	2010	Thomas Viaduct Railroad Bridge		1835	Elkridge and Relay; 39°13′17.5″N 76°42′48.1″W	Maryland	United States	bridges
255	2011	Utica Memorial Auditorium		1959	Utica; 43°6′17.9″N 75°14′0.5″W	New York	United States	buildings
256	2011	Tacoma Narrows Bridges		1940–1950	Tacoma; 47°16′8″N 122°33′3″W	Washington	United States	bridges
257	2011	Flight of Five Locks		1915	Waterford; 42°48′2.8″N 73°41′29.1″W	New York	United States	water transportation
258	2011	Petra		309 BC	30°19′43″N 35°26′31″E	Ma'an Governorate	Jordan	buildings
259	2012	Zion-Mount Carmel Tunnel and Highway		1930	Zion National Park; 37°12′40.7″N 112°57′29.6″W	Utah	United States	roads & rails
260	2012	Huey P. Long Bridge		1935	Jefferson Parish; 29°56′38.8″N 90°10′7.6″W	Louisiana	United States	bridges
261	2012	Grand Central Terminal		1913	New York City; 40°45′10.3″N 73°58′37.9″W	New York	United States	roads & rails
262	2013	Titan Clydebank crane		1907	Clydebank; 55°53′50.5″N 4°24′31.2″W	West Dunbartonshire	Scotland	buildings
263	2013	Waterford Bridges	Troy-Waterford Bridge	1909	Troy and Waterford; 42°47′19.3″N 73°40′25.8″W	New York	United States	bridges
264	2013	Lake Pontchartrain Causeway		1956	Lake Pontchartrain; 30°11′59.2″N 90°7′21.7″W	Louisiana	United States	bridges
265	2014	The Dalles Dam		1957	Columbia River; 45°36′50.3″N 121°8′3″W	Oregon & Washington	United States	dams
266	2015	Gladesville Bridge		1964	Sydney; 33°50′31.3″S 151°8′51.8″E	New South Wales	Australia	bridges
267	2016	Cape Agulhas Lighthouse		1848	L'Agulhas; 34°49′45.7″S 20°0′32.4″E		South Africa	water transportation
268	2016	Arrowrock Dam		1912	Boise and Elmore; 43°35′43″N 115°55′21.1″W	Idaho	United States	dams
269	2016	All-American Canal		1940	Imperial County; 32°52′59″N 114°27′54″W	California	United States	water supply & control
270	2016	Canal du Midi		1681	Toulouse to Étang de Thau; 43°12′52.9″N 2°25′49.8″E	Occitania	France	water transportation
271	2016	Liverpool and Manchester Railway		1830	Liverpool to Manchester; 53°27′10.8″N 2°36′58.6″W	North West England	England	roads & rails
272	2017	Bonnet Carré Spillway		1931	St. Charles Parish; 30°0′7.2″N 90°26′23.3″W	Louisiana	United States	dams
273	2017	Duluth Aerial Ferry/Lift Bridge		1905	Duluth; 46°46′45.8″N 92°5′35.3″W	Minnesota	United States	bridges
274	2017	Mississippi River Basin Model		1966	Jackson; 32°18′21.8″N 90°19′8.2″W	Mississippi	United States	research & educational
275	2017	Chaffey Brothers Irrigation Works		1887	Mildura and Renmark; 34°15′1.6″S 142°13′28.8″E	Victoria and South Australia	Australia	water supply & control
276	2017	Qhapaq Ñan: The Great Inka Road System		1000 BC - 1533 AD	13°13′0.3″S 72°23′5.2″W		Colombia to Chile	roads & rails
277	2017	Tunnel of Eupalinos		520 BC	Samos; 37°41′40.6″N 26°55′48″E	North Aegean	Greece	tunnels
278	2018	Augusta Canal and Industrial District		1845	Augusta; 33°31′17.6″N 82°0′38.9″W	Georgia	United States	power generation
279	2018	Old River Station		1907	Cincinnati; 39°4′17″N 84°25′40″W	Ohio	United States	water supply & control
280	2018	Boundary Layer Wind Tunnel Laboratory		1965	London; 43°0′14″N 81°16′32.5″W	Ontario	Canada	research & educational
281	2018	Institution of Civil Engineers		1818	London; 51°30′4″N 0°7′44.4″W		England	research & educational
282	2018	Union Chain Bridge		1820	Horncliffe to Fishwick; 55°45′9.3″N 2°6′24.4″W		England to Scotland	bridges
283	2019	Kaibab Trail Suspension Bridge		1928	Grand Canyon; 36°6′53.2″N 112°5′21.1″W	Arizona	United States	bridges
284	2019	Union Pacific Railroad		1868	Omaha westward 41°15′0.9″N 95°55′37.4″W	Nebraska	United States	roads & rails
285	2019	Silver Bridge Collapse - Creation of National Inspection Standards		1967	Point Pleasant; 38°50′42″N 82°8′28″W	West Virginia	United States	bridges
286	2020	NASA Vehicle Assembly Building		1966	Titusville; 28°35′11″N 80°39′5″W	Florida	United States	buildings
287	2020	Norwich University		1819	Northfield	Vermont	United States	research & education
288	2021	Main Avenue Bridge		1939	Cleveland; 41°29′55.2″N 81°42′18.5″W	Ohio	United States	bridges
289	2021	Sydney Opera House		1973	Sydney; 33°51′24″S 151°12′55″E	New South Wales	Australia	buildings
290	2022	David Thompson's Surveying and Mapping of the Northwest of North America		1814			Canada & United States	surveys & maps
291	2022	Portage Lake Bridge		1959	Hancock and Houghton; 47°7′25.9″N 88°34′26.7″W	Michigan	United States	bridges
292	2022	Salmon Creek Dam		1914	Juneau; 58°20′30″N 134°24′12″W	Alaska	United States	dams
293	2023	New Orleans Drainage System		1900	New Orleans; 29°59′12″N 90°7′28″W	Louisiana	United States	water supply & control
294	2023	Crystal Springs Dam		1890	San Mateo County; 37°31′43″N 122°21′44″W	California	United States	dams
295	2024	Morris Dam	Morris Dam	1934	Azusa; 34°10′29″N 117°52′52″W	California	United States	dams
296	2025	Summit Tunnel		1867	Donner Pass	California	United States	tunnels
297	2025	Liberty Tunnels Ventilation System		1924	Pittsburgh	Pennsylvania	United States	tunnels

== See also ==
- List of Historic Mechanical Engineering Landmarks
