= Old Folsom Powerhouse Station (Sacramento, California) =

Historical Landmark in Sacramento, United States

Folsom Powerhouse Station A
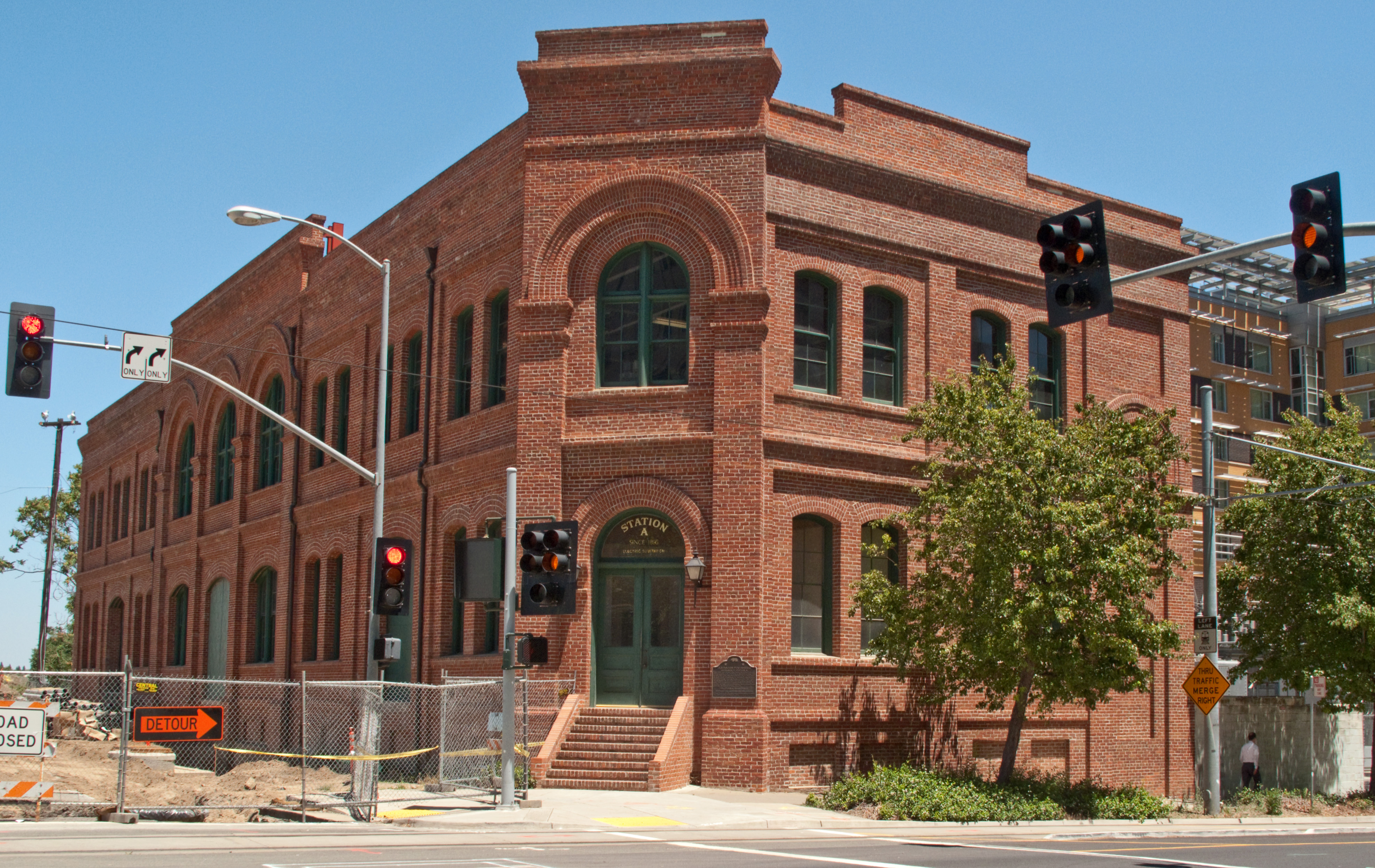
- Folsom Powerhouse Station A

- Location within California Location within the United States
- 38.5839°N 121.4977°W
- Location: NE corner of 6th and H Streets; Sacramento, California

History
- Built: 1894

California Historical Landmark
- Designated: March 3, 1958
- Reference no.: 633.2

Folsom Powerhouse Station A is a historical building in Sacramento, California. The Folsom Powerhouse Station is a California Historical Landmark No. 633.2 listed on March 3, 1958. Station A was constructed by the Sacramento Electric Power and Light Company in 1894. Folsom Powerhouse Station A is located at the northeast corner of 6th and H Streets. Folsom Powerhouse Station A was the first electricity distribution site for Sacramento. The electricity came from Folsom Powerhouse, California Historical Landmark No. 633.0. The Folsom Powerhouse Station A started operates on July 13, 1895. With the power, Folsom Powerhouse Station A was able run the first overhead wire streetcar system not just Sacramento, but the nearby California Central Valley. Folsom Powerhouse Station A, outputted alternating current (AC) produced by the Folsom Powerhouse hydroelectric power station. This AC system was one of the first AC system in the United States, as at the time other systems were DC current.

== See also ==
- California Historical Landmarks in Sacramento County
- List of Historic Civil Engineering Landmarks
- List of Historic Mechanical Engineering Landmarks
- List of California state parks
- Revolving armature alternator
