= Albert Fink =

German-American civil engineer and railroad executive (1827–1897)

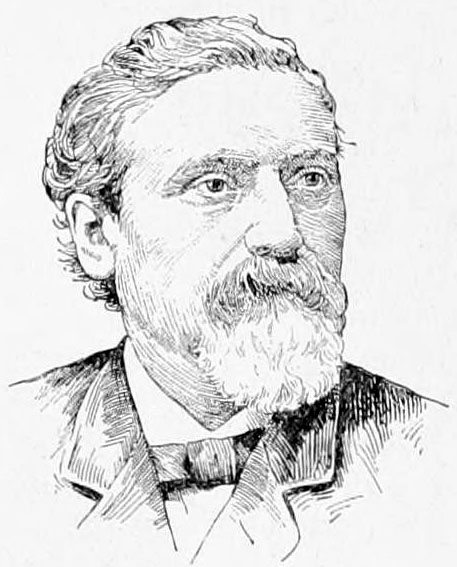
- Born: October 27, 1827; Lauterbach, Hesse, Germany
- Died: April 3, 1897 (aged 69); Ossining, New York, U.S.
- Engineering career
- Discipline: Civil Engineer
- Significant design: Fink truss

Signature
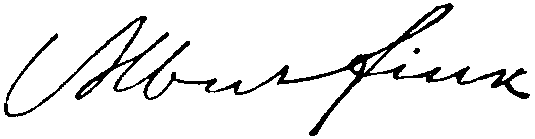

Albert Fink (October 27, 1827 – April 3, 1897) was a German-born civil engineer who worked in the United States. He is best known for his railroad bridge designs, which helped revolutionize the use of iron for American railroad bridge construction. He devised the Fink truss and many truss bridges, especially the Fink-Type Truss Bridge.

== Biography ==
Born in Lauterbach, Hesse, Germany, he studied architecture and engineering at the polytechnic school in Darmstadt and graduated in 1848. He participated in the Revolution of 1848 in Frankfurt. In 1849, he emigrated to the United States. He found work with the Baltimore and Ohio Railroad as a draftsman, and became chief office assistant to Benjamin H. Latrobe. In this position, he oversaw the design and construction of buildings and bridges, including the construction of the road between Cumberland, Maryland and Wheeling, West Virginia (then in the state of Virginia). Fink supervised much of the design and oversaw the building of some of the first iron bridges in the nation, including that over the Monongahela River in Fairmont, West Virginia. It was this bridge that first implemented his design of the Fink truss and was, in fact, in its time the longest iron railroad bridge. With the completion of this portion of road, the section between Grafton and Parkersburg, West Virginia was commenced, and many of the bridges and tunnels of this route were also supervised by him. He was also, during this time, a consulting engineer of the Norfolk and Petersburg Railway, which was at the time building the bridge at Norfolk, Virginia. He left the Baltimore and Ohio Railroad in 1857 to become the assistant of George McLeod, chief engineer of the Louisville and Nashville Railroad. Under them he built numerous bridges, including the Green River Bridge in Kentucky, then the longest iron bridge in the nation, a bridge in Nashville, Tennessee over the Cumberland, and one over the Ohio at Louisville, Kentucky, which at one mile in length was the longest truss bridge of its time.

During the Civil War, he served in the road and machinery department as chief engineer and superintendent. Many bridges were destroyed and roads severed during this period, and Fink led the operating force to repair damages and guard against disasters. Structural losses incurred were no less than half a million dollars in that day's monetary value. Fink meanwhile advanced quickly within the Louisville and Nashville Railroad, first becoming chief engineer. In 1865, he was appointed as general manager, and by 1870, elected vice president. The 1873 financial crisis prompted him to study the cost of transportation, and he subsequently published two pamphlets on the topic, officially known as "The Fink Report on Costs of Transportation."

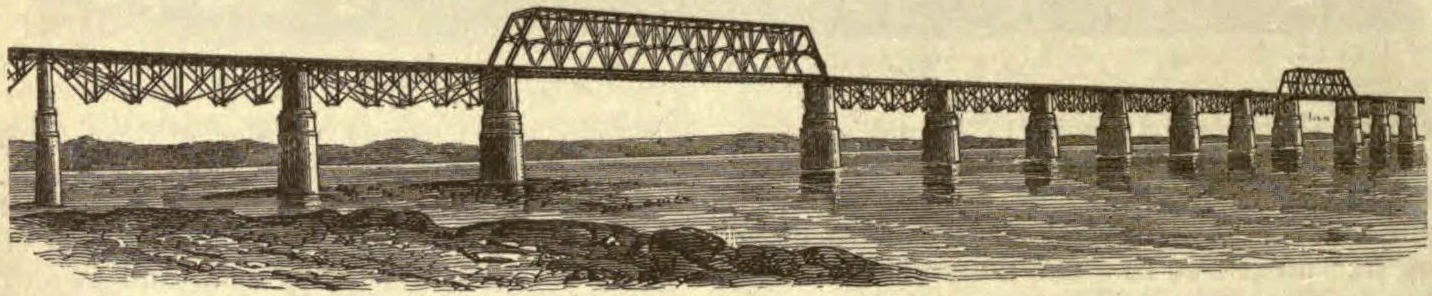
Fink's Viaduct Bridge at Louisville, Kentucky

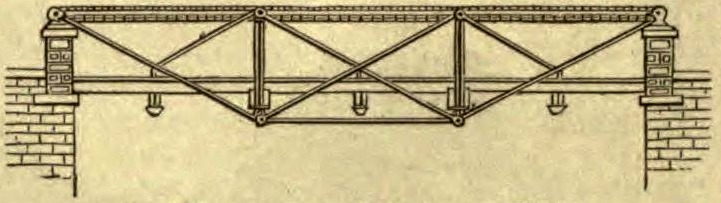
Modified Fink trussed Girder bridge

During this time, he also looked for a way to ease the competition between railroad companies and rather have them cooperate. He devised a plan for the Southern Railway and Steamship Association, which would be adopted and formed in Atlanta. He resigned as vice president and general manager in October 1875 of the Louisville and Nashville Railroad to focus on the organization and management of the Southern Railway and Steamship Association and served as its general commissioner. For two years he worked to stabilize the competitive freight rates amongst the 25 rail companies. He set out to travel to Germany in June 1877. Upon arriving in New York City, he was requested by Vanderbilt, Jewett, Scott, and Garrett, presidents of the four great railroad companies, to stay in the city and organize the westbound railroad traffic on their lines. He accepted the commissionership of these trunk lines, and managed the position with success. In 1878, he was made president of the American Society of Civil Engineers. He retired from his post in 1889, and died in Ossining, New York, United States.

== Notes ==
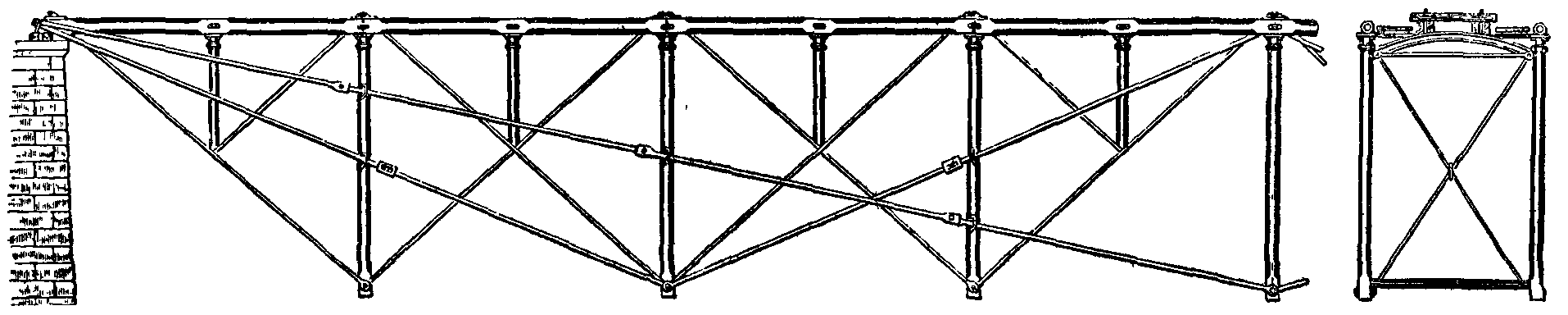
Fink Truss (half span and cross section)
