= Robert Wilhelm =

Robert Wilhelm may refer to:

- Robert Wilhelm (politician) (1925–1991), member of the Ohio House of Representatives
- Robert G. Wilhelm (born 1960), American mechanical engineer.
