= Robert G. Wilhelm =

American mechanical engineer

Robert Gerard Wilhelm
- Born: June 27, 1960 (age 66); Mobile, Alabama
- Education: Wichita State University, Purdue University, University of Illinois
- Awards: Society of Manufacturing Engineers S.M. Wu Research Implementation Award
- Scientific career
- Fields: Precision engineering, Advanced manufacturing
- Workplaces: University of Nebraska — Lincoln, University of North Carolina at Charlotte

Robert Gerard Wilhelm (born June 27, 1960) is an American mechanical engineer.

Wilhelm consults in areas of engineering, leadership, innovation, and economic development. In 2025 he retired as the Kate Foster professor in Mechanical and Materials Engineering at the University of Nebraska — Lincoln. From 2018 to 2023 he served as the Vice Chancellor for Research and Economic Development at UNL.

Before joining the University of Nebraska — Lincoln, he served as Vice Chancellor for Research and Economic Development at the University of North Carolina at Charlotte. There, he also held a faculty appointment as a professor.

His expertise is in precision engineering and advanced manufacturing.

== Early life and education ==
Bob Wilhelm was born June 27, 1960, in Mobile, Alabama. As a child, his family moved to Raleigh, North Carolina, where his father, William J. Wilhelm, earned a PhD in Civil Engineering at North Carolina State University. Their family relocated to Morgantown, West Virginia when William J. Wilhelm joined the West Virginia University civil and environmental engineering faculty. While there, Wilhem's mother, Patricia Zietz, earned a Bachelor of Arts in elementary education and Master of Arts in special education. Later, his father joined Wichita State University as the Dean of the College of Engineering, and their family relocated to Wichita, Kansas.

Wilhelm earned a Bachelor of Science in Industrial Engineering from Wichita State University in 1981, after beginning coursework at West Virginia University from 1977 to 1979. From 1981 to 1982, he studied the history of science and technology at the University of Leicester and the Ironbridge Gorge Museum as a Rotary Foundation Fellow. In 1984, he earned a Master of Science in Industrial Engineering from Purdue University. In 1992, he received a Ph.D. in Mechanical Engineering from the University of Illinois.

== Career ==
Early in his career, Wilhelm worked on naval structures and submarines. He also worked in restoration of historic structures including the original iron furnace at Ironbridge (Coalbrookdale, United Kingdom), Jackson's Mill (Lewis County, West Virginia), Staats Mill Covered Bridge and the Fink-Type Truss Bridge (Hamden, New Jersey).

Wilhelm has also worked in engineering at Cincinnati Milacron and the Palo Alto Laboratory of Rockwell Science Center. His engineering has impacted results in computer design and manufacturing, automation and controls, factory and enterprise software, mechanical design and computational geometry, digital twin approaches to manufacturing for Caterpillar Inc., aerospace design and manufacturing for the Boeing F/A-18E/F Super Hornet and AI approaches to logistics for the US military program Dynamic Analysis and Replanning Tool.

He joined University of North Carolina at Charlotte in 1992 as a faculty member and later co-founded a high-tech company in Charlotte, OpSource.

In 1994, he was recognized with the Young Investigator Award of the National Science Foundation. He was a founding faculty member at UNC Charlotte in 5 different PhD programs: Mechanical Engineering, Biology and Biotechnology, Information Technology, Optical Sciences, and Nanoscale Sciences. Wilhelm was a very early and longstanding member of the Precision Engineering and Metrology Group at the University of North Carolina at Charlotte.

Wilhelm's engineering research has addressed metrology and measurement theory for complex mechanical parts, virtual manufacturing for design of manufacturing systems, software, and automation and artificial intelligence for mechanical design and tolerance synthesis.

As a higher education leader he has led university organizations at UNC Charlotte and UNL that envisioned, built and operated innovation campuses with partner companies working collaboratively on the university site. In Charlotte, these organizations included The Charlotte Research Institute Campus at UNC Charlotte and the University Research Park. In Nebraska, Wilhelm led the Nebraska Innovation Campus during his time as vice chancellor at the University of Nebraska - Lincoln.

== Awards ==
Wilhelm is a fellow of the National Academy of Inventors and the International Academy for Production Engineering.

In 2012, he received the Society of Manufacturing Engineers S.M. Wu Research Implementation Award.
