= New Castle Ice Piers =

- U.S. National Register of Historic Places
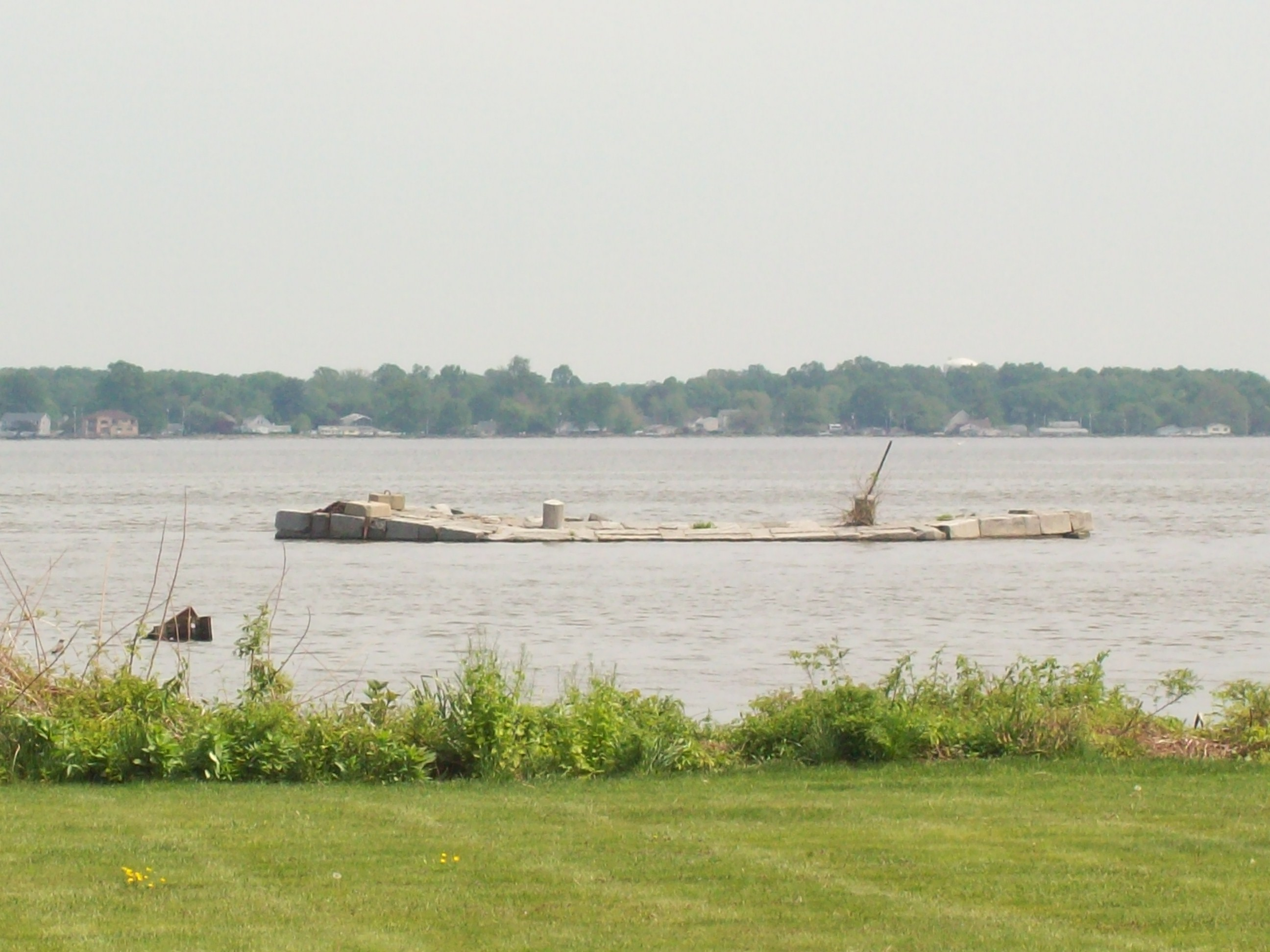
- New Castle Ice Piers, May 2010

- Location within Delaware Location within the United States
- Nearest city: New Castle, Delaware
- Coordinates: 39°39′28″N 75°33′39″W
- Area: 9 acres (3.6 ha)
- Built: 1803
- Architect: U.S. Army
- NRHP reference No.: 82002333
- Added to NRHP: February 4, 1982

The New Castle Ice Piers are historic ice breaks located at New Castle in New Castle County, Delaware. The seven stone piers were constructed between 1803 and 1882. Each pier consists of an outer shell of finished granite blocks with an inner core of rubble.

They were added to the National Register of Historic Places in 1982. The ice piers have also been designated as a National Historic Civil Engineering Landmark by the American Society of Civil Engineers.
