= Kumu Kahua Theatre =

Coordinates: 21.3104°N 157.8633°W

Kumu Kahua Theatre is a community theater located in the city of Honolulu on the island of Oahu in the state of Hawaii. Kumu Kahua Theatre is best known for producing plays by local Hawaii-based playwrights, especially plays featuring themes and stories of the people of Hawaii. (Their motto, as seen on their T-shirts and Web site, is "Plays about life in Hawaiʻi. Plays by Hawaiʻi playwrights. Plays for people of Hawaiʻi.") Therefore, actors are often featured utilizing their natural local dialect or respective ethnic accent, and many plays have incorporated or are solely written in Hawaiian Creole English, an English dialect commonly known in the Hawaiian islands as pidgin. Their productions are also known for involving local actors, designers, directors, and theater technicians. Appropriately the Hawaiian language words kumu kahua translate to "original stage." People familiar with the theatre often call it affectionately by its nickname of Kumu.

== History ==
Kumu Kahua Theatre was founded in 1971 by graduate students of the University of Hawaii at Manoa , with the goal of producing locally-written experimental works. The experimental nature of the theatre gradually disappeared in later years. In 1982, the group was granted not-for-profit status, and in 1994, the Hawaii State Legislature awarded the group its current 100-seat playhouse located in downtown Honolulu at 46 Merchant Street. Dennis Carroll served as its artistic director for many years. Kumu Kahua's current artistic director is Harry Wong III.

== Playwriting ==
Kumu Kahua Theatre also offers classes in acting and writing, as well as sponsoring an annual playwrighting contest in conjunction with the University of Hawaii at Manoa theatre department. The playwrighting contest categories are as follows:

- Hawaii Prize: This award is open to Hawaii residents and nonresidents, and the play must be set in Hawaii or involve some aspect of the Hawaii experience.
- Pacific/Rim Prize: This award is open to Hawaii residents and nonresidents, and the play must be set in or involve the Pacific Islands, the Pacific Rim or the Pacific/Asian-American experience.
- Resident Prize: This award is open only to residents of Hawaii at the time of submission, and the topic of the play is unrestricted.

== See also ==
- University of Hawaii at Manoa
- Kamehameha V Post Office
