= Kamehameha V Post Office =

- U.S. National Register of Historic Places
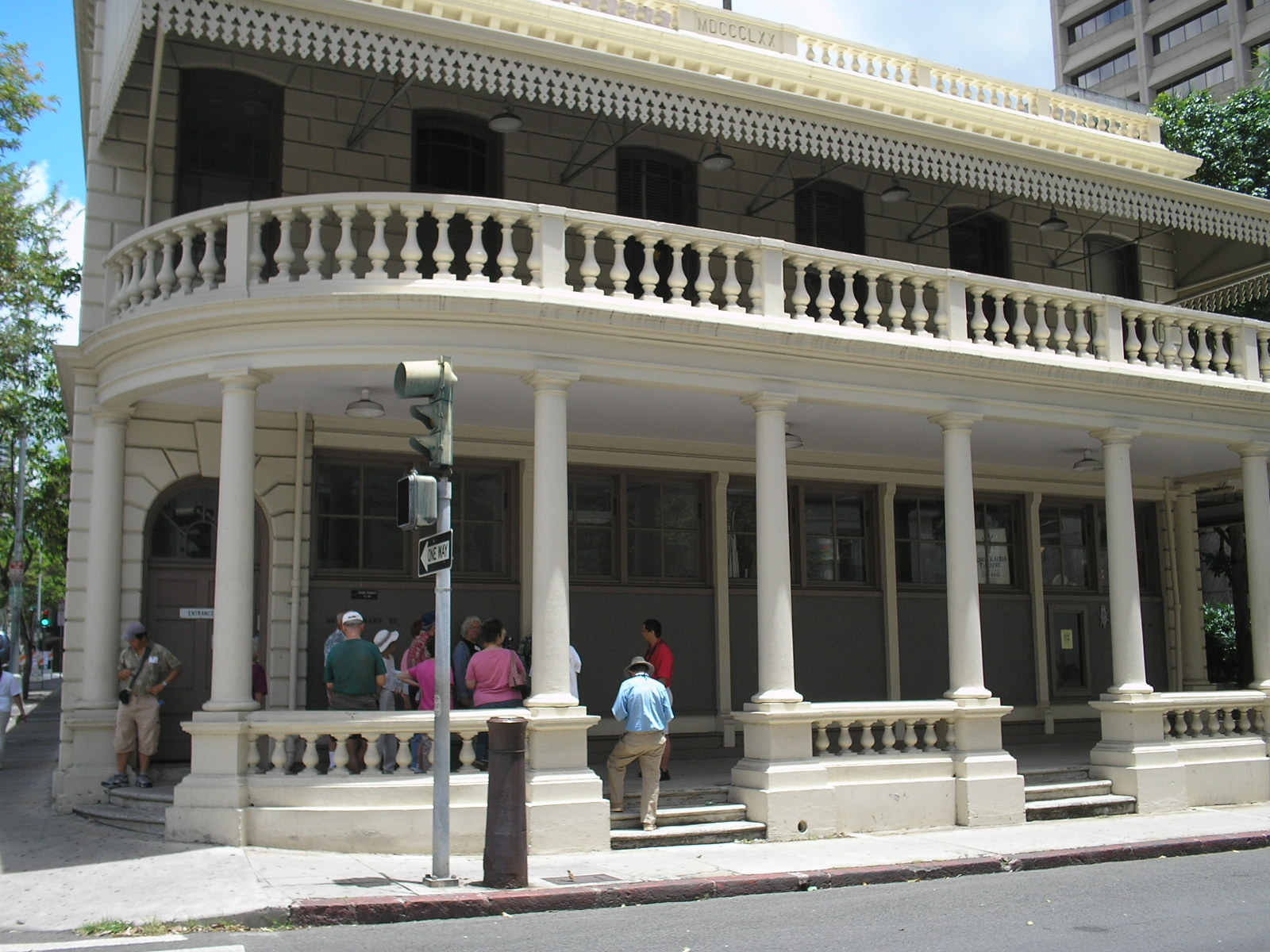

- Location within Hawaii
- Nearest city: Honolulu, Hawaii
- Coordinates: 21°18′35″N 157°51′47″W
- Area: 1 acre (0.40 ha)
- Built: 1871
- Architect: J.G. Osborne
- Architectural style: Neoclassical
- NRHP reference No.: 72000416
- Added to NRHP: May 5, 1972

Kamehameha V Post Office at the corner of Merchant and Bethel Streets in Honolulu, Hawaii was the first building in the Hawaiian Islands to be constructed entirely of precast concrete blocks reinforced with iron bars. It was built by J.G. Osborne in 1871 and the success of this new method was replicated on a much grander scale the next year in the royal palace, Aliʻiōlani Hale. The building was added to the National Register of Historic Places on 5 May 1972 and was designated as a National Historic Civil Engineering Landmark in 1987. It was named for King Kamehameha V, who built a number of public buildings during his reign.

The building served as a post office until it was converted into a district court office in 1922. In 1976 it was restored by the architects Anderson & Reinhardt as an example of the European Neoclassical architecture and new methods of construction during the Hawaiian Monarchy.

== See also ==
- List of United States post offices
- Kumu Kahua Theatre
