= Folsom Powerhouse State Historic Park =

- Folsom Powerhouse
- U.S. National Register of Historic Places
- U.S. National Historic Landmark
- California Historical Landmark No. 633
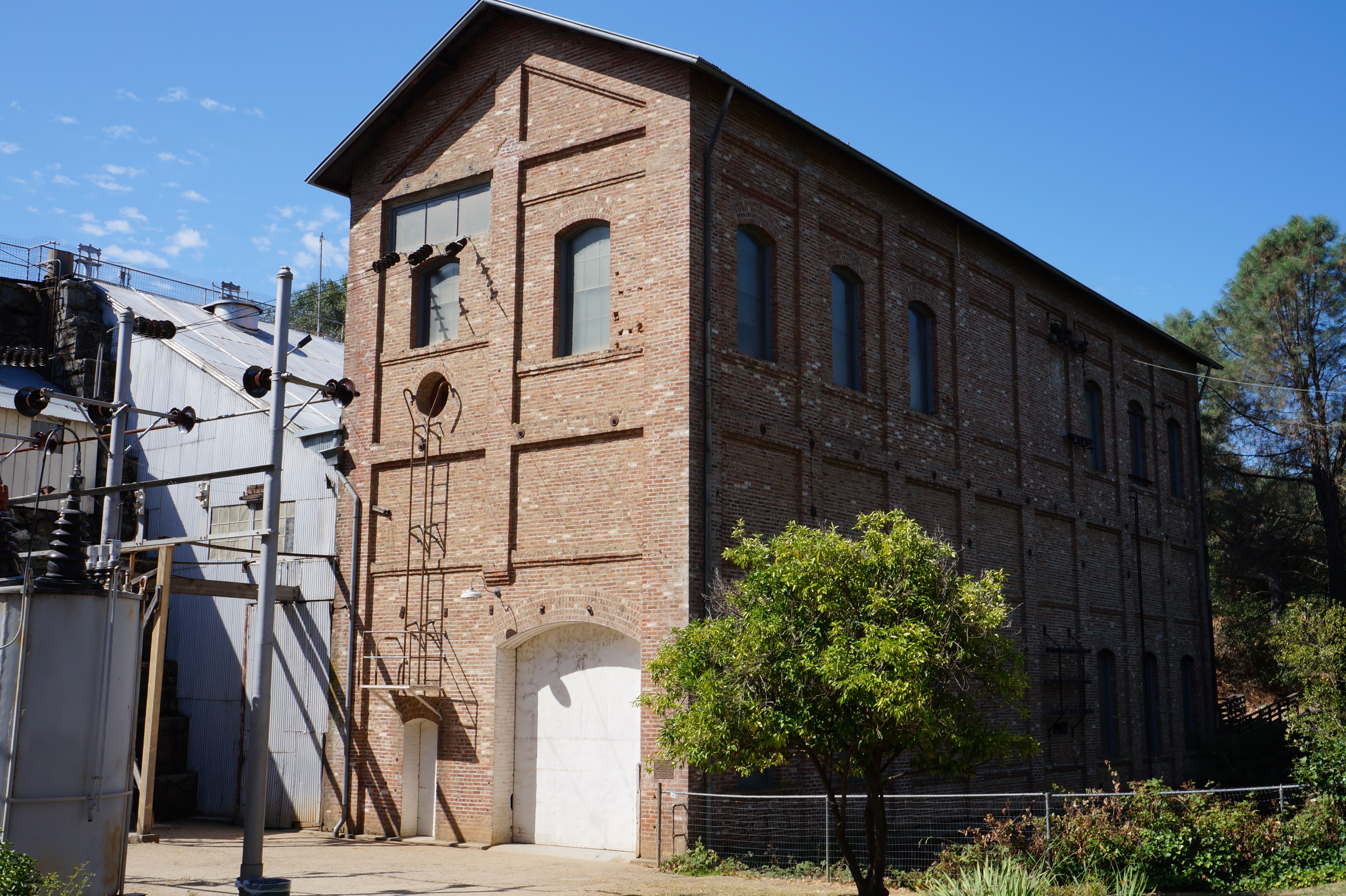
- Folsom Powerhouse on the American River in July 2015

- Location within California Location within the United States
- Location: Folsom, California
- Coordinates: 38°40′50″N 121°10′32″W
- Built: 1895
- Architect: H.T. Knight; Sacramento Electric Power & Light Co
- NRHP reference No.: 73000426
- CHISL No.: 633

Significant dates
- Added to NRHP: October 2, 1973
- Designated NHL: May 29, 1981

Folsom Powerhouse State Historic Park is a historical site preserving an 1895 alternating current (AC) hydroelectric power station—one of the first in the United States.

Before the Folsom powerhouse was built nearly all electric power houses were using direct current (DC) generators powered by steam engines located within a very few miles of where the power was needed. The use of rushing water to generate hydroelectric power and then transmitting it long distances to where it could be used was not initially economically feasible as long as the electricity generated was low-voltage direct current. Once it was invented, AC power made it feasible to convert the electrical power to high voltage by using the newly invented transformers and to then economically transmit the power long distances to where it was needed. Lower voltage electrical power, which is much easier and safer to use, could be easily gotten by using transformers to convert the high voltage power to lower voltages near where it was being used. DC power cannot use a transformer to change its voltage. The Folsom Powerhouse, using part of the American River's rushing water to power its turbines connected to newly invented AC generators, generated three phase 60 cycle AC electricity (the same that's used today in the United States) that was boosted by newly invented transformers from 800 volts as generated to 11,000 volts and transmitted to Sacramento over a 22 mi (35 km)-long distribution line, one of the longest electrical distribution lines in the United States at the time.

== Introduction ==
In Sacramento the 11,000 volts AC power was transformed down to a lower voltage near where it was needed for use. The Folsom Powerhouse was one of the first examples of significant electrical power being generated and economically shipped to where it could be used. Hydroelectric power had been demonstrated as a viable source of economical power despite being located a significant distances from the users. The Folsom Powerhouse is located 23 miles (37 km) above Sacramento on the American River in the city of Folsom.

== History ==
The power station remained in operation until 1952 when the original Folsom dam across the American River was destroyed to make way for the new much larger Folsom Dam. The powerhouse was shut down after 57 years of continuous operation. Pacific Gas and Electric, who bought the original hydroelectric plant in 1902, donated the plant and most of its equipment to the State of California when the new Folsom Dam and hydroelectric plant was built. The State of California designated the site as California Historical Landmark Number #633. The 35-acre (14 ha) historic park was established in 1956. The powerhouse was designated a U.S. National Historic Landmark in 1981. The two-story brick and granite Powerhouse looks much as it did in 1895. Its imposing generators, and the Tennessee marble-faced control switchboard stand as imposingly as they did more than a hundred years ago. Historic photos, interpretive exhibits and docent guided tours by the California State Park Service explain how the powerhouse worked. Some of the original water turbines, generators, etc. are still in place.

Before AC electric generators and the newly invented transformers were invented only DC electrical generators could be used to generate electrical power and they were restricted by their low voltage requirements to economically transmitting power for only a few miles. Too much power was lost in transmission at low voltage for long-distance power transmission to be practical. This meant the original power stations were restricted (at that time) to local steam generating plants built right in each local neighborhood. Pearl Street Station was the first central power plant in the United States. It was located at 255–257 Pearl Street in downtown Manhattan on a site measuring 50 by 100 feet (15 by 30 m), just south of Fulton Street. It began with one direct current generator powered by a coal burning steam engine, and it started generating electricity on September 4, 1882, serving an initial load of 400 incandescent lamps used by 85 customers located within about 2 miles (3.2 km) of the station.

However, with the advent of AC, there came the use of transformers to convert the generated power to a much higher voltage for transmission allowed the power plants and users to be separated by hundreds of miles if needed. The high voltage could then use transformers to obtain lower voltages for final use. Single point failures were minimized in the plant design. The AC generators and their associated water turbines were so large that they could not be shipped by rail and were shipped 19,000 miles (31,000 km) around Cape Horn by ship. Only two of the four alternating current generators were operating on July 13, 1895, when the powerhouse provided the first electricity to Sacramento via 22 miles (35 km) of transmission lines, making it one of the first places in the United States to transmit long-distance hydroelectric power. The Folsom power plant predates Niagara Falls Adams power House generating AC electrical transmission for local use and shipment to Buffalo, New York in 1897. The International Electro-Technical Exhibition - 1891 in Frankfurt am Main Germany demonstrated an earlier instance of long distance AC transmission of hydroelectric power. Westinghouse Electric Company and General Electric were in a race to develop better equipment and bring it to the United States.

== Water supply ==
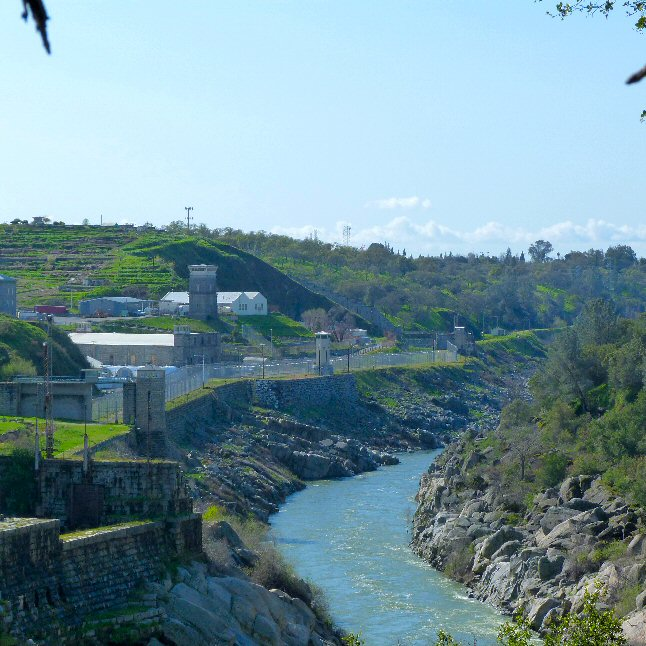
Old Folsom Dam Region near Folsom Prison below Existing Dam

The water for the original Folsom hydroelectric plant was obtained from a diversion dam, 650 feet (200 m) long, 24 feet (7.3 m) wide at the top; 87 feet (27 m) wide at the bottom and 89 feet (27 m) tall, across the American River built in the 1890s. The dam diverted a large stream of water into a 2.5 miles (4.0 km) long diversion canal—the East Canal. This canal was 50 feet (15 m) wide and 8 feet (2.4 m) deep, carrying about 85,000 cubic feet (2,400 m^{3}) of water per minute. The canal paralleled the river but sloped much less steeply gradually getting about 85 feet (26 m) above the river. The dam and canal were completed in 1893 under the direction of Horatio Gates Livermore who originally thought to use the power of the falling water to power a sawmill. Livermore utilized in part contracted prison labor from the nearby Folsom State Prison to help build the dam and canal. The geometry of the canal forebay and the American River gave the Folsom power plant a Hydraulic head of water of about 85 feet (26 m) (about 70 feet (21 m) was usable) before its water was discharged back into the American River. Initially only about 35 feet (11 m) of this hydraulic head was used. The water from the canal ended in a forebay where water borne debris was separated from the water and it was fed into four large 8-foot-diameter (2.4 m) penstocks and two smaller penstocks. All penstocks had water gates that could be closed to turn the water off on any turbine for maintenance. The AC generators, some of the largest designed and built up to that time, were powered via four penstocks full of rushing water driving four large turbines.

== Turbines ==
The four large water turbines, some of the largest built up to that time, were made by S. Morgan Smith Works of York, Pennsylvania. There were two small penstocks plus turbines for the two DC generators.

Rushing water from the American River passing through four large water turbines powered the four AC generators and two more turbines powered smaller DC generators.

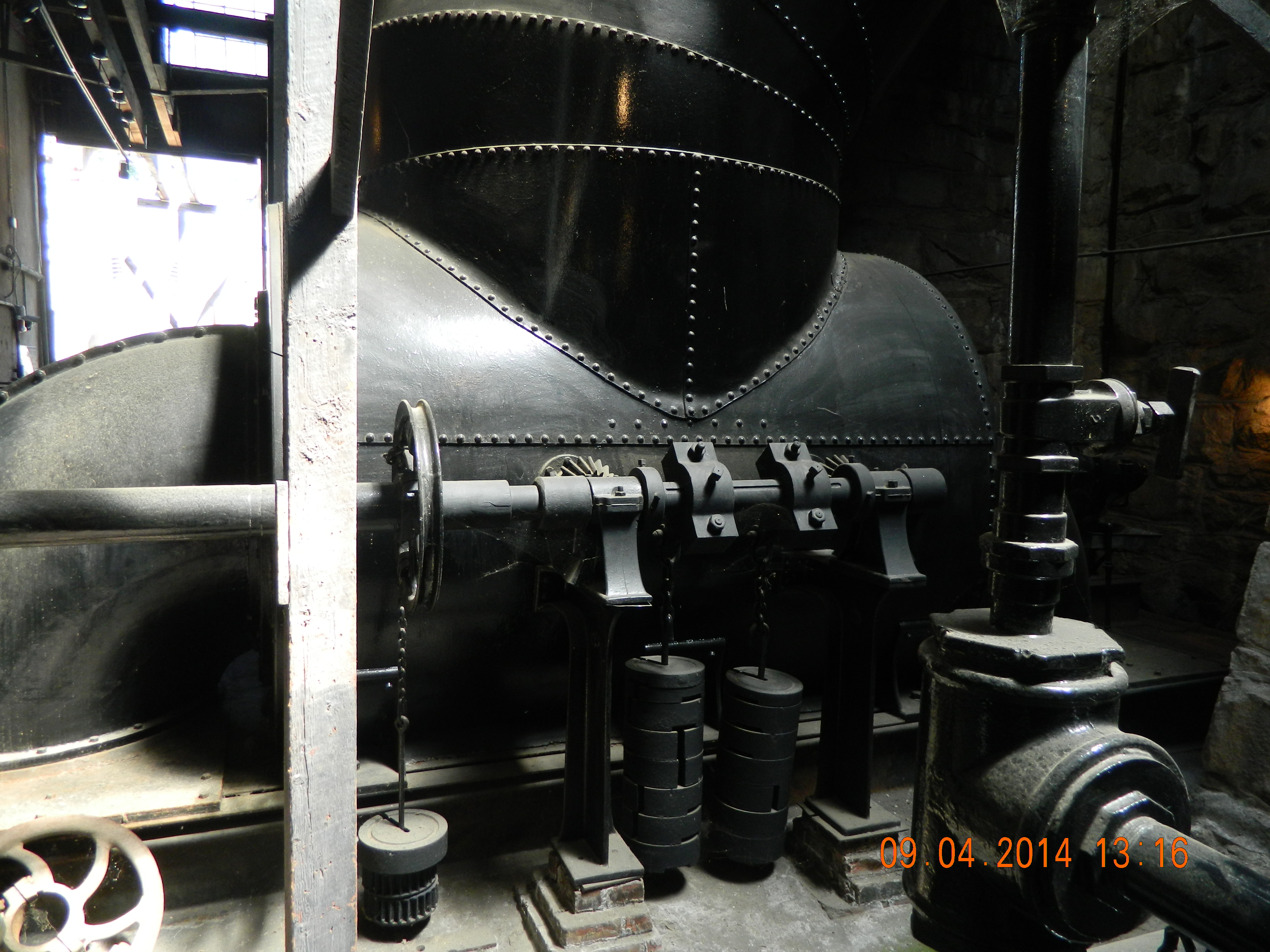
Folsom Upper House Main Turbine.JPG

== Governors ==
The four large turbines were connected directly to the alternating current generators and their speed controlled by adjusting the water flow, with a centrifugal governor, to obtain 300 shaft rpm—needed to generate a steady 60 cycle current.

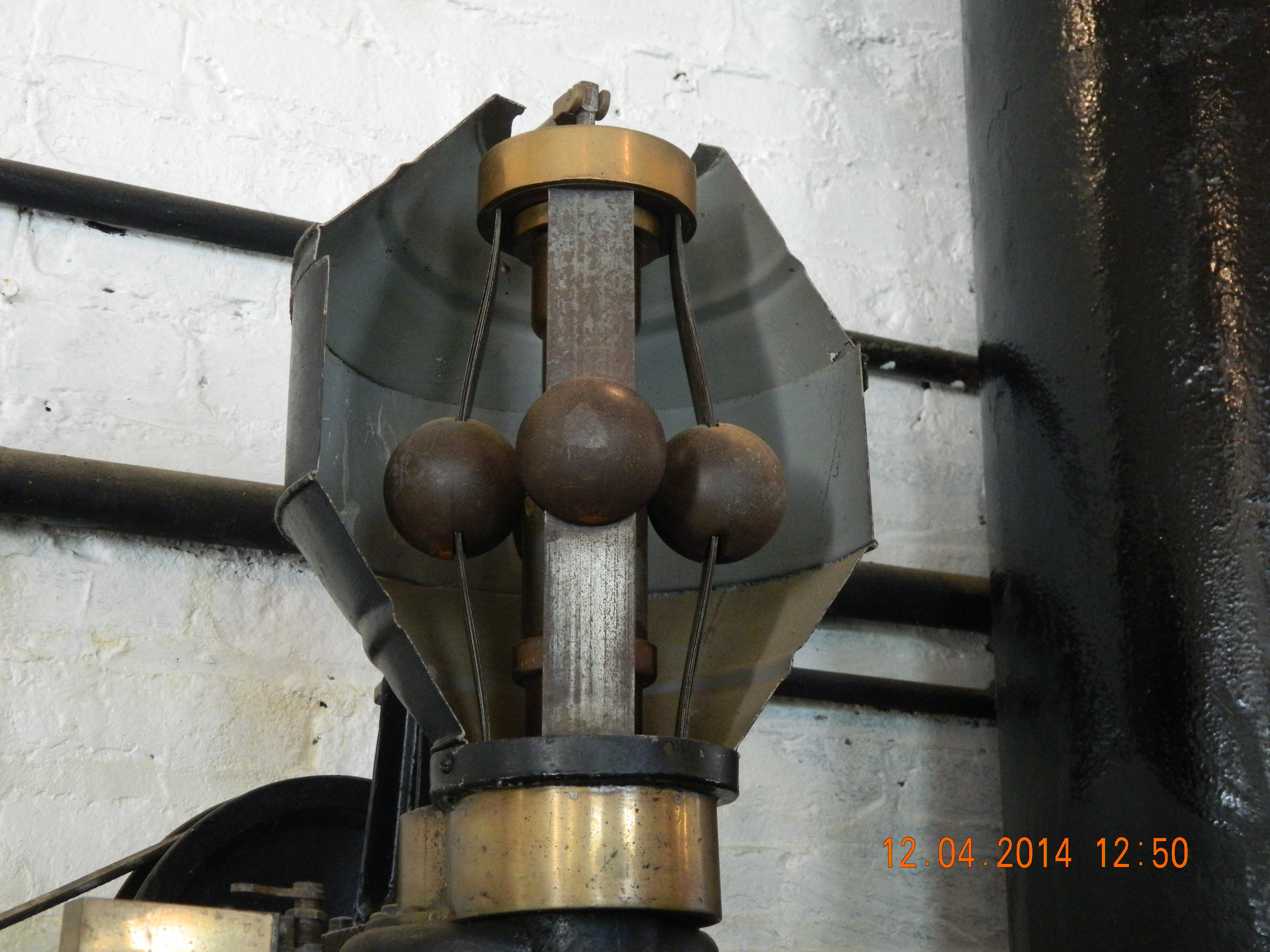
Lombard Water Wheel Governor Flyball assembly

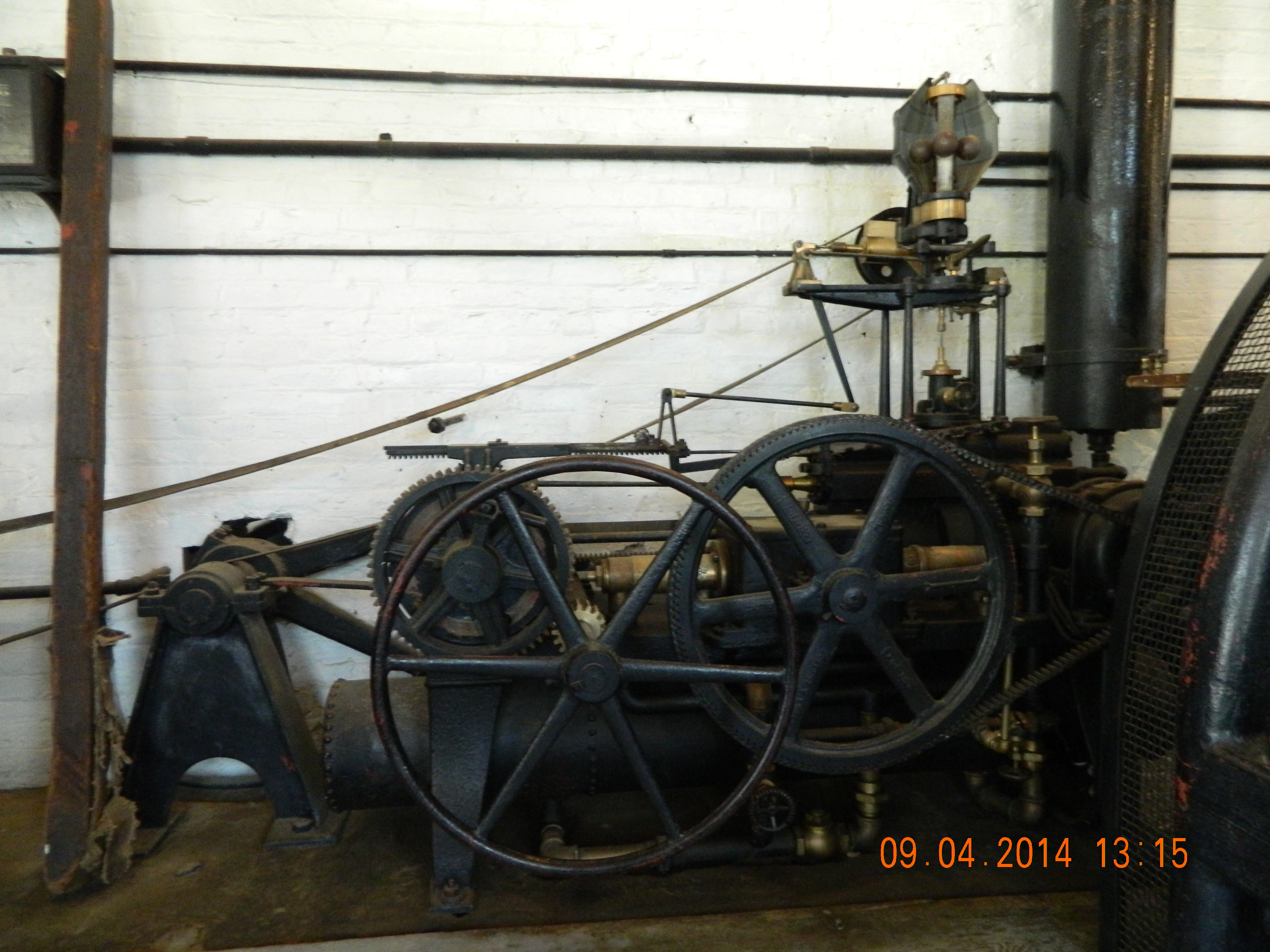
Lombard Water Wheel Governor

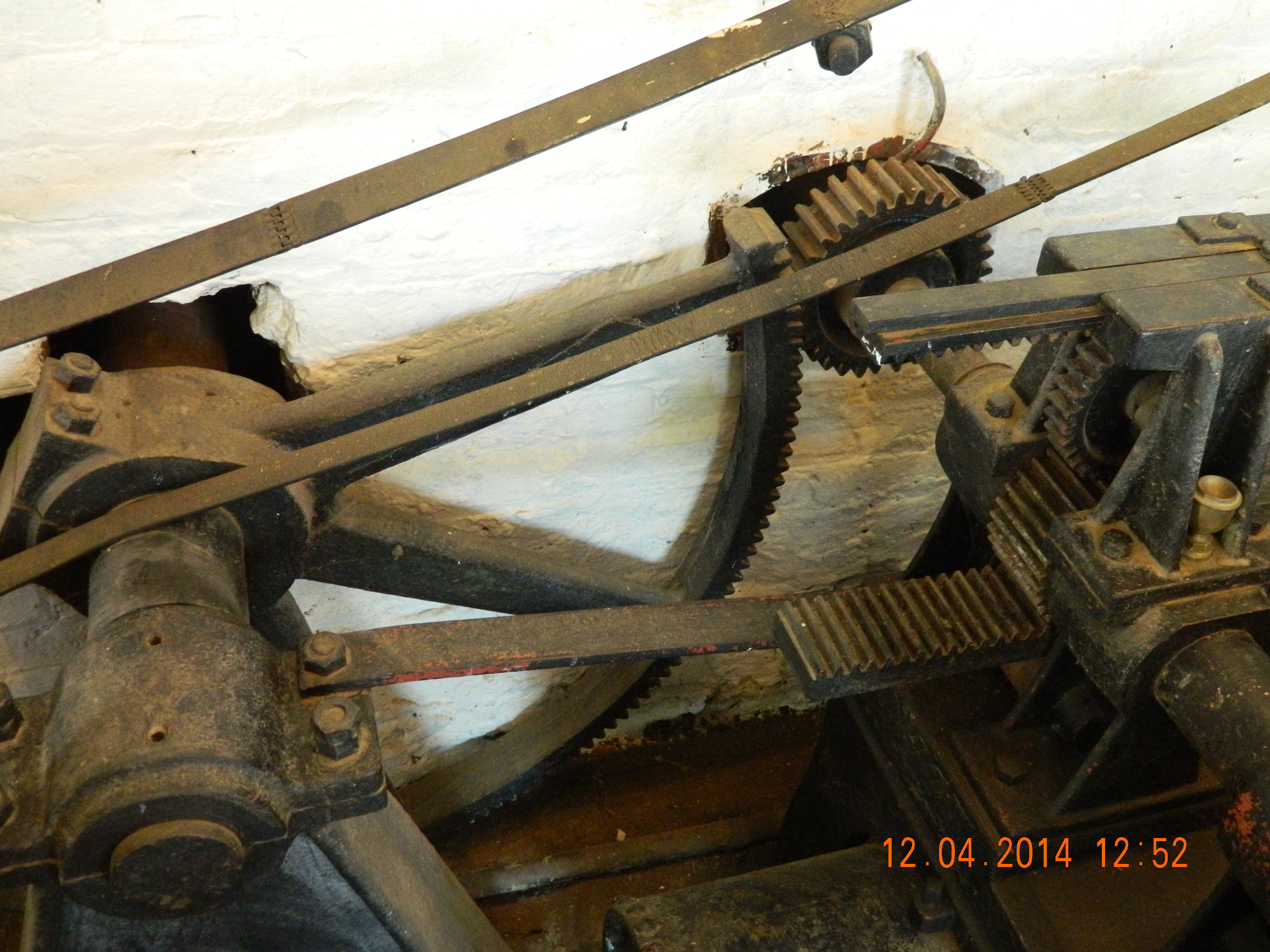
Turbine Control Input Sector Gear With Governor Output

== Alternators ==
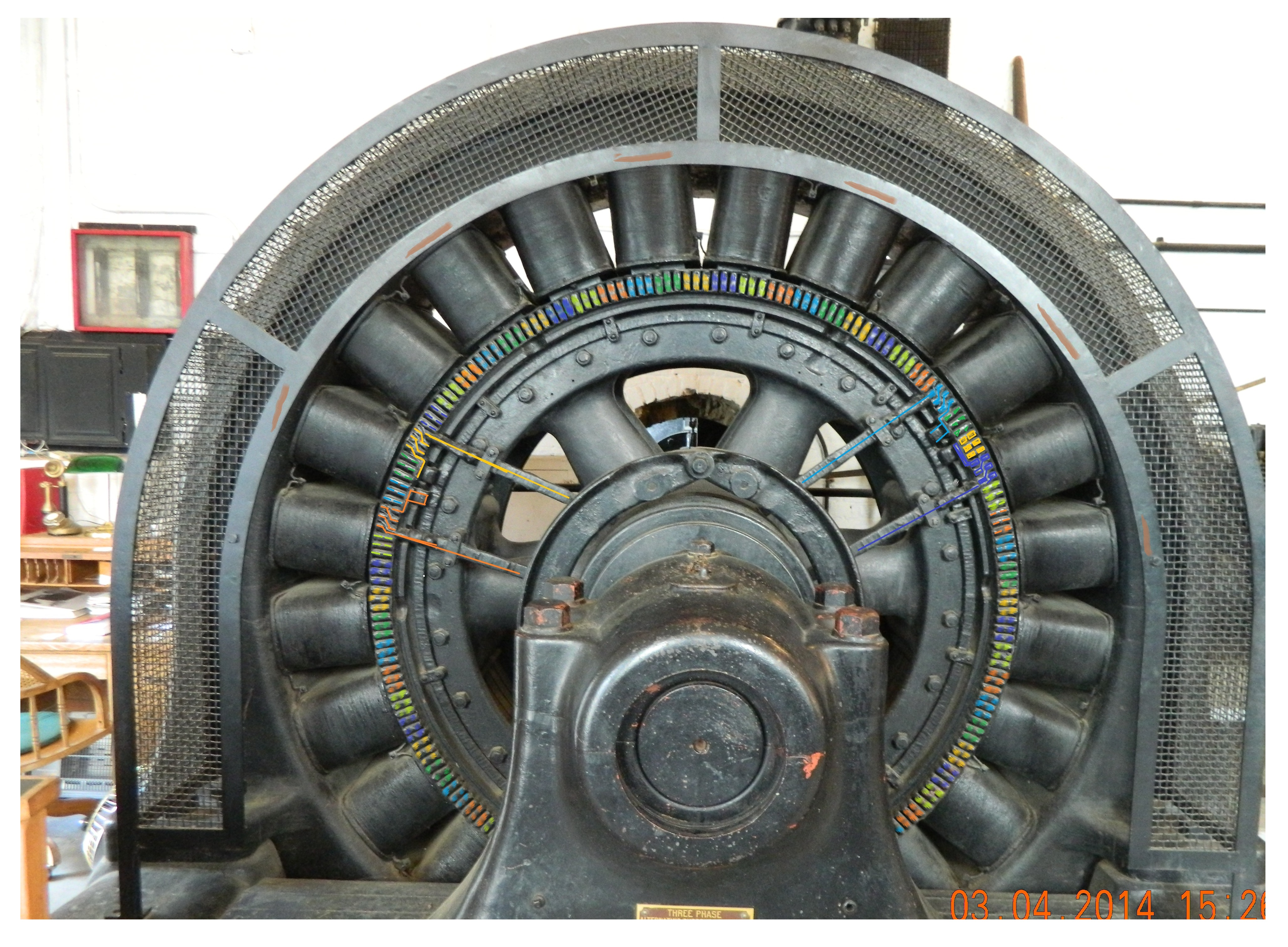
Folsom Powerhouse Alternator (armature phasing colors added)

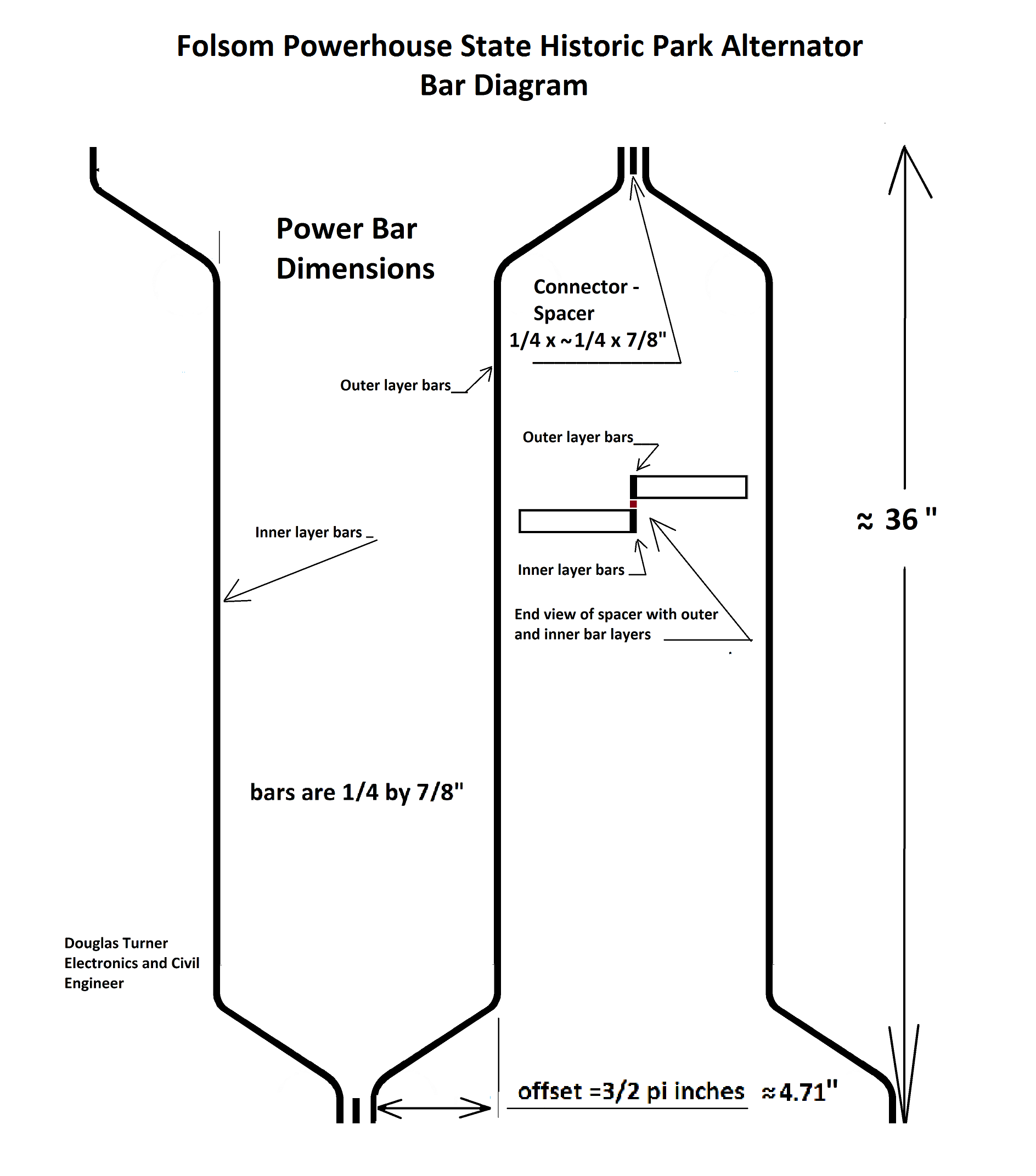
Inductor "S" shapes advance around rotor

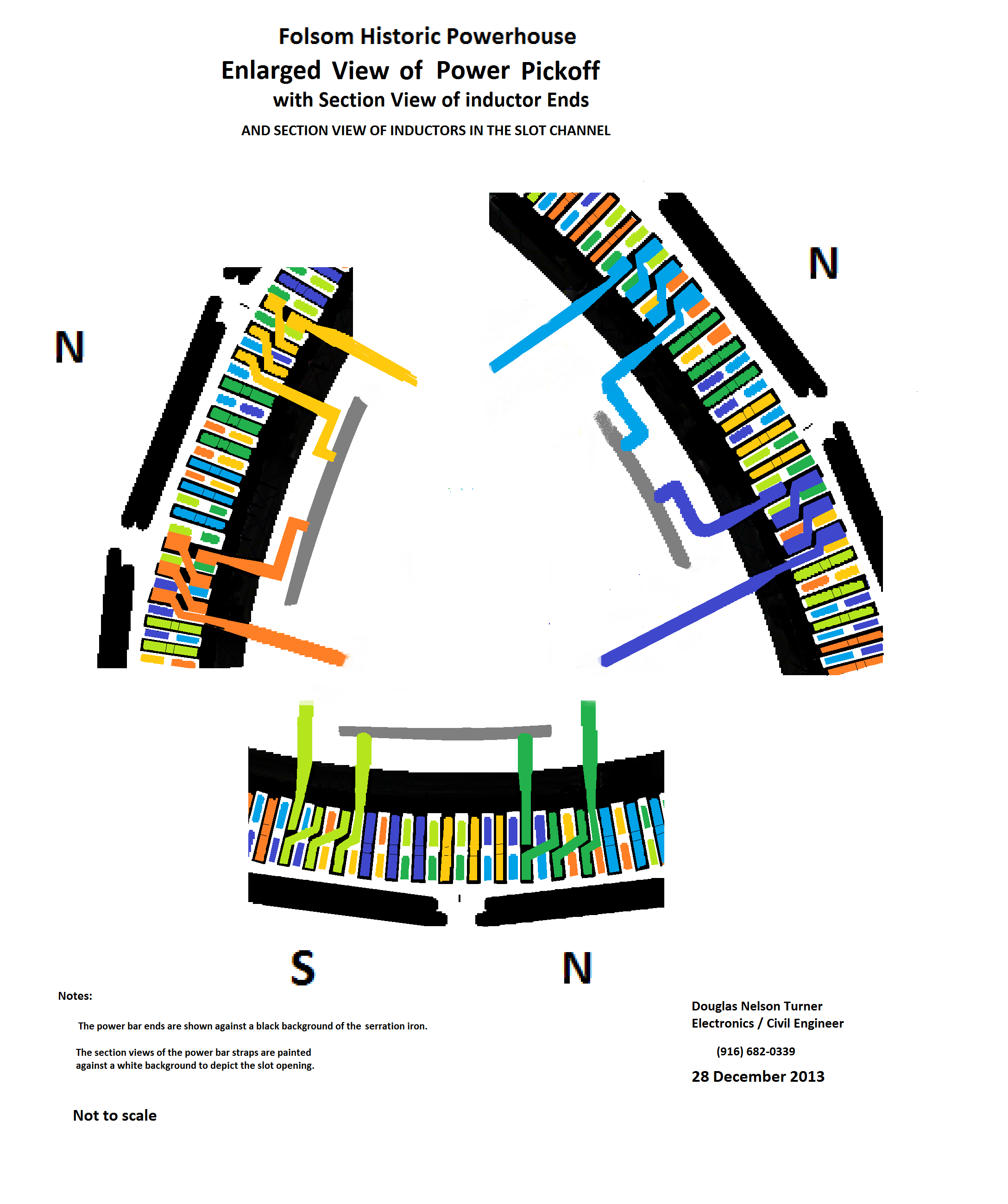
Enlarged drawing of radial bus bar terminations.

The four alternating current generators are some of the most powerful rotating armature 3-phase machines ever built. Newly invented by Elihu Thomson, they weighed almost 30 tons each (57,887 pounds) and were 8.5-foot-tall (2.6 m). These original AC generators used many DC generator components in their first design. The 750-kilowatt (1,005 horsepower) alternating current generators were made in the newly incorporated General Electric plant in Schenectady, New York.

The alternators had rotating armatures with 216 radial 4 inch slots formed into the perimeter. Each slot holds two insulated 3 1/2 foot rectangular inductive bars of related phase, an inner circle of 216 bars and an outside circle of 216 bars. The induction bars are twice bent into offsets in the same direction. The middle of the bar has a straight section 3 feet long, to get from the front of the rotor to the back. The inner circle of bars is connected to the outer circle by small conductive jumper blocks on the front and back of the rotor. The rotor's three phases are connected to six branch circuits. Each of the six branch circuits make their way three times progressively around the rotor in right hand flattened spirals.

Supplying power for the 24 stator (non-rotating) field coil magnets on the AC generators was a small direct current generator with another DC generator in standby mode for immediate substitution if needed. If one DC generator failed or needed maintenance the other one could be used. All four AC generators power were connected to each other, when long-term demand increased and it was found that tying generators together improved frequency control, by synchronizing action.

== Switch panel ==
To allow customers to use electric clocks regulated by synchronous motors, a Frequency "Indicator" was added to the Powerhouse switchboard.

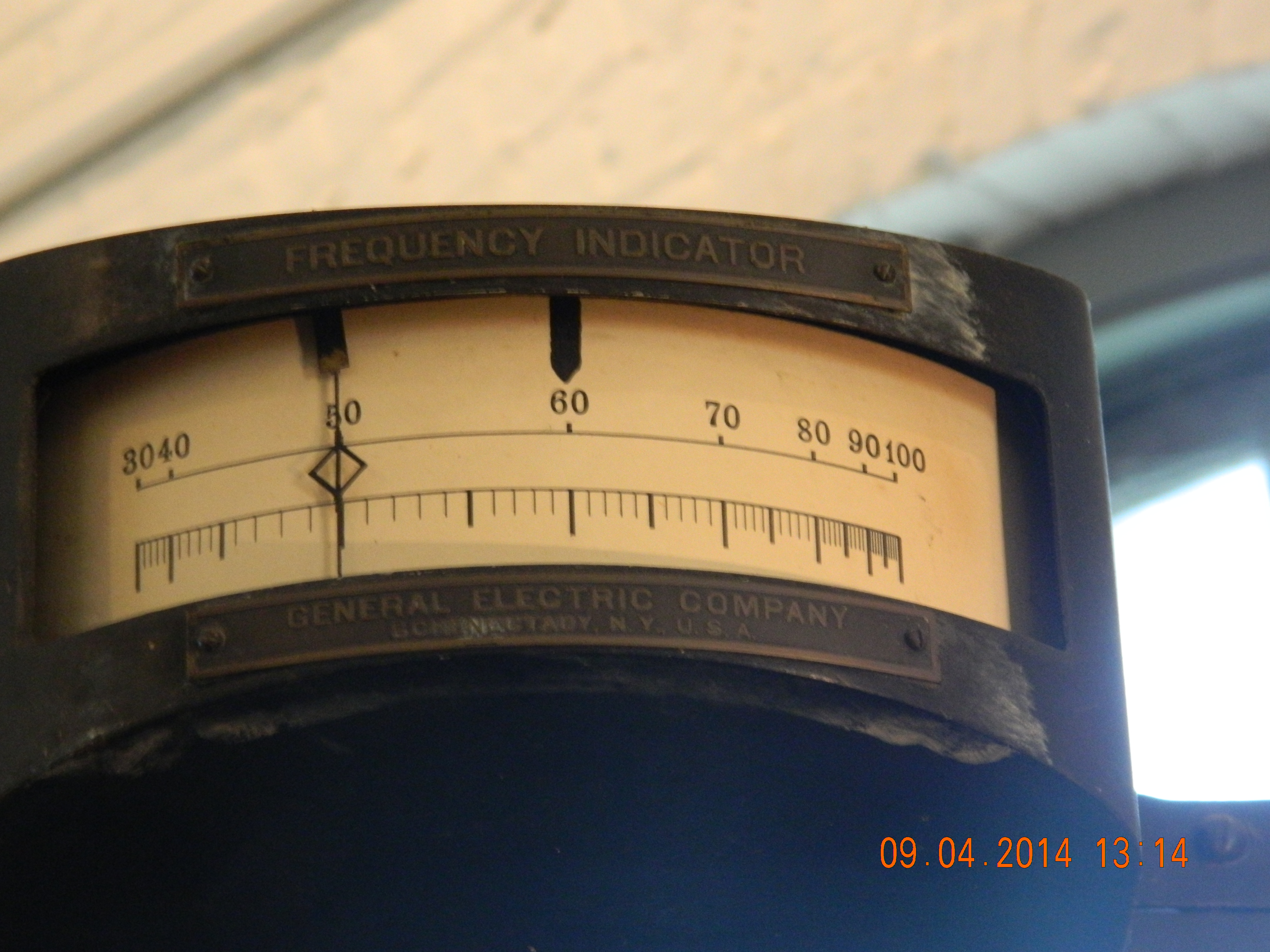
Folsom Powerhouse Frequency Indicator

To allow parallel alternators and power grid, a Synchroscope was added to the Switch Panel.

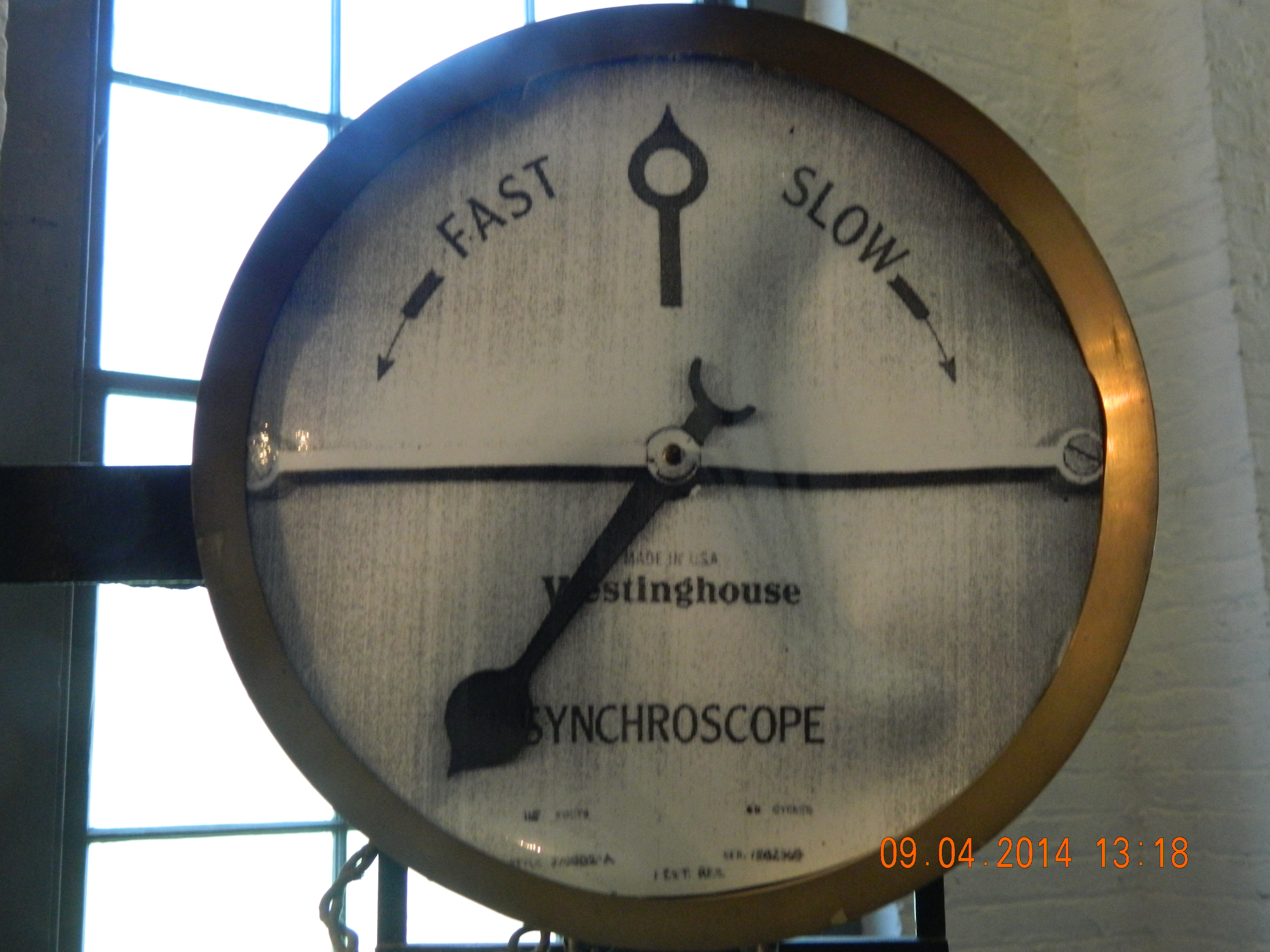
Folsom Synchroscope

== Transmission lines ==
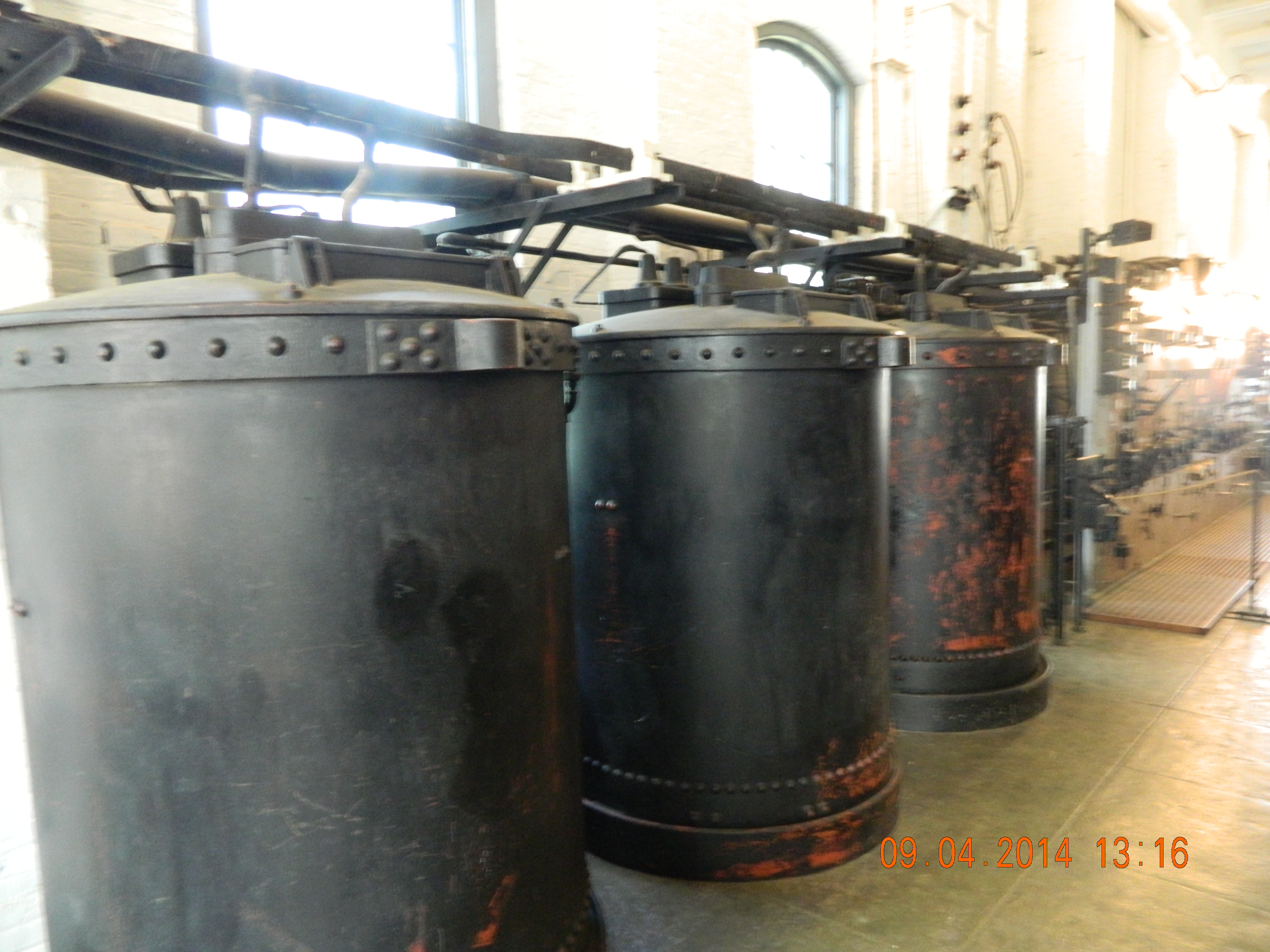
11 kV transformers, oil and water cooled

The AC power generated (about 4,020 horse power or 3 MW) at the Folsom hydroelectric facility was converted to 11,000 volts at the power plant by twelve new (in 1895) air cooled transformers invented by William Stanley, Jr. and transmitted to Sacramento on twelve bare #1 AVG copper wires held by ceramic insulators that were attached to the cross beams mounted on two sets of 40 feet (12 m) cedar poles. The multiple wires allowed four independent three phase lines to be used. This allowed for repairs, maintenance and new installations without shutting the whole system down. The poles were planted about 105 feet (32 m) apart to string the power lines. Telephone lines were run beneath the power lines. Once in Sacramento the high voltage power was shipped near where it was going to be used and transformed down to a lower voltage for use—the same as electrical power is shipped and used today. By 1895 almost 900 electric street railways and nearly 11,000 miles (18,000 km) of track had been built in the United States and they were then one of the main users of electrical energy. Direct current electric motors, as used on electrical streetcars, were restricted in use to being only a few miles from the DC generators. DC power, despite its restrictions, had become very useful. A rotary converter, a type of motor generator, was used to convert alternating current (AC) to direct current (DC) for railway electrification from an AC power source. Factories were also heavy power users.

Transforming AC voltages up to high voltages for long-distance transmission and down to lower voltages at locations close to their use was a very attractive way to get access to a new source of power. Improvements in transformer design allowed the original air cooled transformers at the Folsom powerhouse to be replaced in 1900 with more efficient oil cooled transformers.

The alternating current electric induction motor was independently introduced in 1888 by Galileo Ferraris and Nikola Tesla, by 1895 was beginning to allow electrical power to replace steam as a power source. The induction motor allowed alternating current to be used directly without any conversions. The first heavy AC motor users were various factories which typically replaced their steam power plants. Alternating current electrical power and its easy conversion with transformers from low to high voltage and back to low voltage made possible the widespread electrical grids we routinely use today for a myriad of tasks.

On September 9, 1895, the new power provided by the powerhouse was celebrated in a "Grand Electric Carnival" decorating the Sacramento state capital with thousands of light bulbs to celebrate the 45th anniversary of California statehood.

== Lower powerhouse ==
A second powerhouse was constructed below the original facility in 1897 to house an additional 750-kilowatt AC generator to meet the growing residential and public transit electricity demands of Sacramento. This generator was separated from the turbine turning it by about a 20 feet (6.1 m) rope belt pulley system. As new uses and users for electricity increased, by the early 1900s the demand for electricity in Sacramento and its adjacent cities had out-paced the capacity of the expanded Folsom Powerhouse. Larger hydroelectric plants and dams were built along the Yuba, Feather, and Tuolumne Rivers in order to provide power for Northern California. The San Francisco-based California Gas and Electric Company bought the Folsom Powerhouse by 1902. When the company was reorganized into the Pacific Gas and Electric Company in 1906, it retooled the powerhouse and forebay.

== See also ==
- Old Folsom Powerhouse Station A
- National Register of Historic Places
- List of Historic Civil Engineering Landmarks
- List of Historic Mechanical Engineering Landmarks
- List of California state parks
- Revolving armature alternator
