= Fink-Type Truss Bridge =

- U.S. National Register of Historic Places
- New Jersey Register of Historic Places
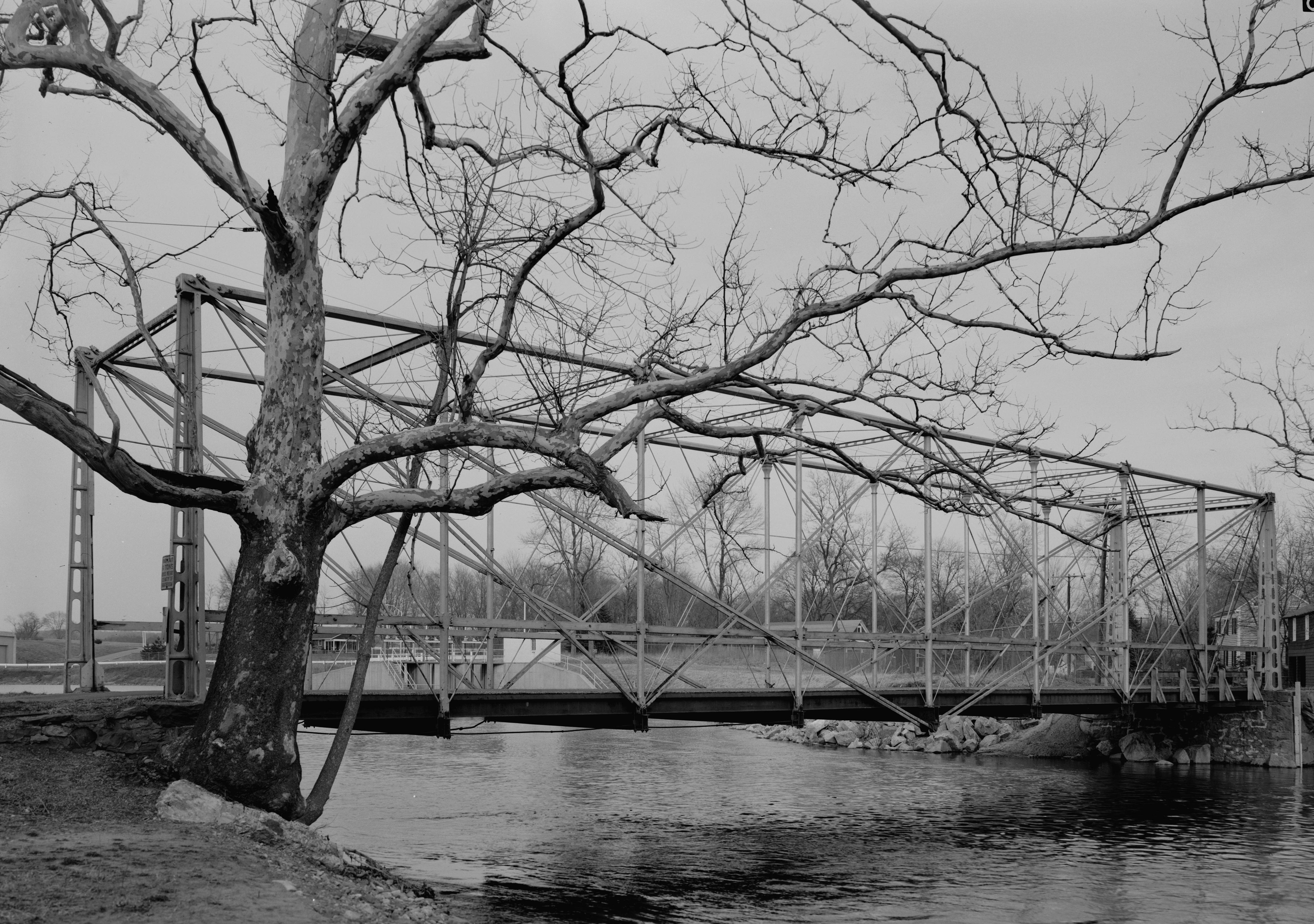
- Fink-Type Truss Bridge in 1971

- Location within Hunterdon County, New Jersey Location within New Jersey Location within the United States
- Nearest city: Allerton, New Jersey; Hamden, New Jersey
- Coordinates: 40°36′14″N 74°54′08″W
- Built: 1857
- Architect: Trenton Locomotive & Machine Manufacturing Co.
- Architectural style: Fink truss
- NRHP reference No.: 74001161
- NJRHP No.: 1578

Significant dates
- Added to NRHP: December 24, 1974
- Designated NJRHP: November 20, 1974

The Fink-Type Truss Bridge, also known as the Hamden Bridge, carried Hamden Road/River Road over the South Branch Raritan River, the border between Clinton Township and Franklin Township, at Hamden near the Allerton section of Hunterdon County, New Jersey. The bridge was built in 1857 by the Trenton Locomotive and Machine Manufacturing Company. It consisted of a single-span through truss 100 feet (30 m) long, 15 feet (4.6 m) wide, and 19 feet (5.8 m) high.

The bridge was added to the National Register of Historic Places on December 24, 1974, for its significance in engineering. At the time of its nomination, it was one of the earliest surviving iron truss bridges in the United States. The Fink truss bridge was patented by Albert Fink in 1854, and the Hunterdon county bridge, built 3 years later, was a nearly perfect example of the patented design. It collapsed as a result of an automobile collision in 1978. The remaining pieces were subsequently relocated to the Hunterdon County Government Center. It was documented by the Historic American Engineering Record in 1984, which included photos from 1971.

== See also ==
- National Register of Historic Places listings in Hunterdon County, New Jersey
- List of bridges documented by the Historic American Engineering Record in New Jersey
- List of bridges on the National Register of Historic Places in New Jersey
- List of Historic Civil Engineering Landmarks
- List of crossings of the Raritan River
