= Fink truss =

The Fink truss is a commonly used truss in residential homes and bridge architecture. It originated as a bridge truss although its current use in bridges is rare.

== History ==
The Fink Truss Bridge was patented by Albert Fink in 1854.

Albert Fink designed his truss bridges for several American railroads especially the Baltimore and Ohio and the Louisville and Nashville. The 1865 Annual Report of the President and Directors of the Louisville and Nashville Railroad Company lists 29 Fink Truss bridges out of a total of 66 bridges on the railroad.

The first Fink Truss bridge was built by the Baltimore and Ohio Railroad in 1852 to span the Monongahela River at Fairmont, Virginia (now West Virginia). It consisted of three spans, each 205 feet long. It was the longest iron railroad bridge in the United States at the time.

Several other Fink trusses held world records for their time including the Green River Bridge (c. 1858) carrying the Louisville and Nashville Railroad over its namesake river near Munfordville, Kentucky, and the first bridge to span the Ohio River which included a 396-foot span built between 1868 and 1870. Although the design is no longer used for major structures, it was widely used from 1854 through 1875.

== Design ==
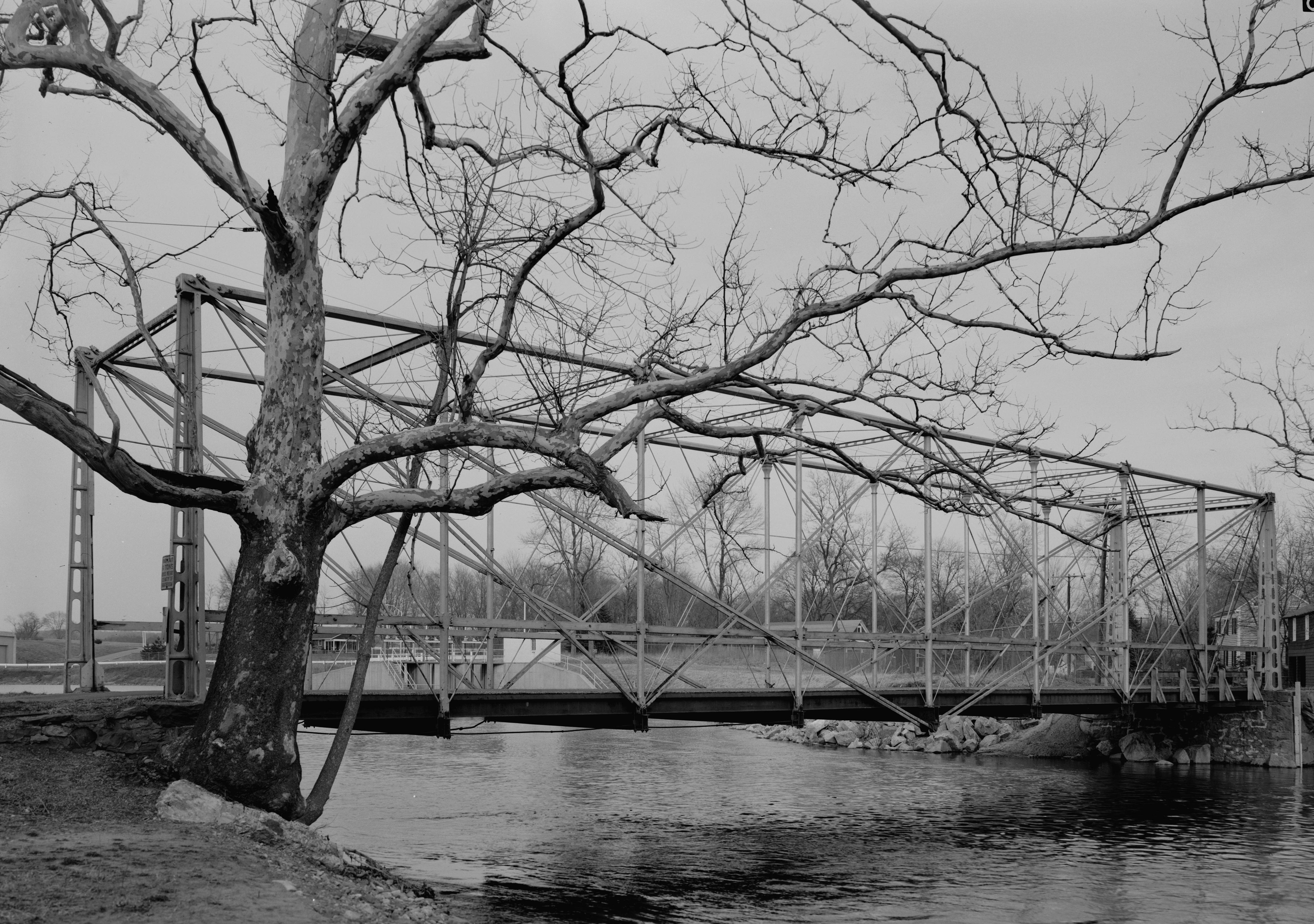
An example of a Fink truss bridge

It is identified by the presence of multiple diagonal members projecting down from the top of the end posts at a variety of angles. These diagonal members extend to the bottom of each of the vertical members of the truss with the longest diagonal extending to the center vertical member. Many Fink trusses do not include a lower chord (the lowest horizontal member). This gives the bridge an unfinished saw-toothed appearance when viewed from the side or below, and makes the design very easy to identify. If the bridge deck is carried along the bottom of the truss (called a through truss) or a lightweight lower chord is present, identification is made solely by the multiple diagonal members emanating from the end post tops.

An inverted Fink truss has a bottom chord without a top chord.

== Notable examples ==
Three historic Fink truss bridges remain intact in the United States. None is in its original location.

The Zoarville Station Bridge consists of one of the original three spans of a through truss of Fink design built in 1868 by Smith, Latrobe and Company of Baltimore, Maryland. It originally carried Factory Street over the Tuscarawas River in Tuscarawas County, Ohio. In 1905 one span of the structure was relocated to Conotton Creek where it is now a pedestrian only crossing. It is listed on the National Register of Historic Places, documented by the Historic American Engineering Record and carries the Zoar Valley Trail, the intrastate Buckeye Trail, and the interstate North Country Trail.

A 56 foot long single span deck truss of Fink design was built in 1870 to carry trains of the Atlantic, Mississippi and Ohio Railroad (later Norfolk and Western Railway, now Norfolk Southern Railway). The original location of this structure is unknown. In 1893 it was relocated to carry Old Forest Road over the Norfolk and Western in Lynchburg, Virginia, and in 1985 the structure was again relocated to Riverside Park in the City of Lynchburg to preserve the historic structure for future generations. It now carries pedestrians only.

An 1870 Fink Truss pedestrian bridge built by Phoenix Iron Works of Phoenixville, Pennsylvania, survives mostly intact in Warwick County Park in Chester county. The bridge originally crossed French Creek but is now used as a viewing platform on a foot trail.

A fourth sample, the Fink-Type Truss Bridge, survived in Clinton Township, New Jersey until it was destroyed by a traffic accident in 1978.

== Current use ==
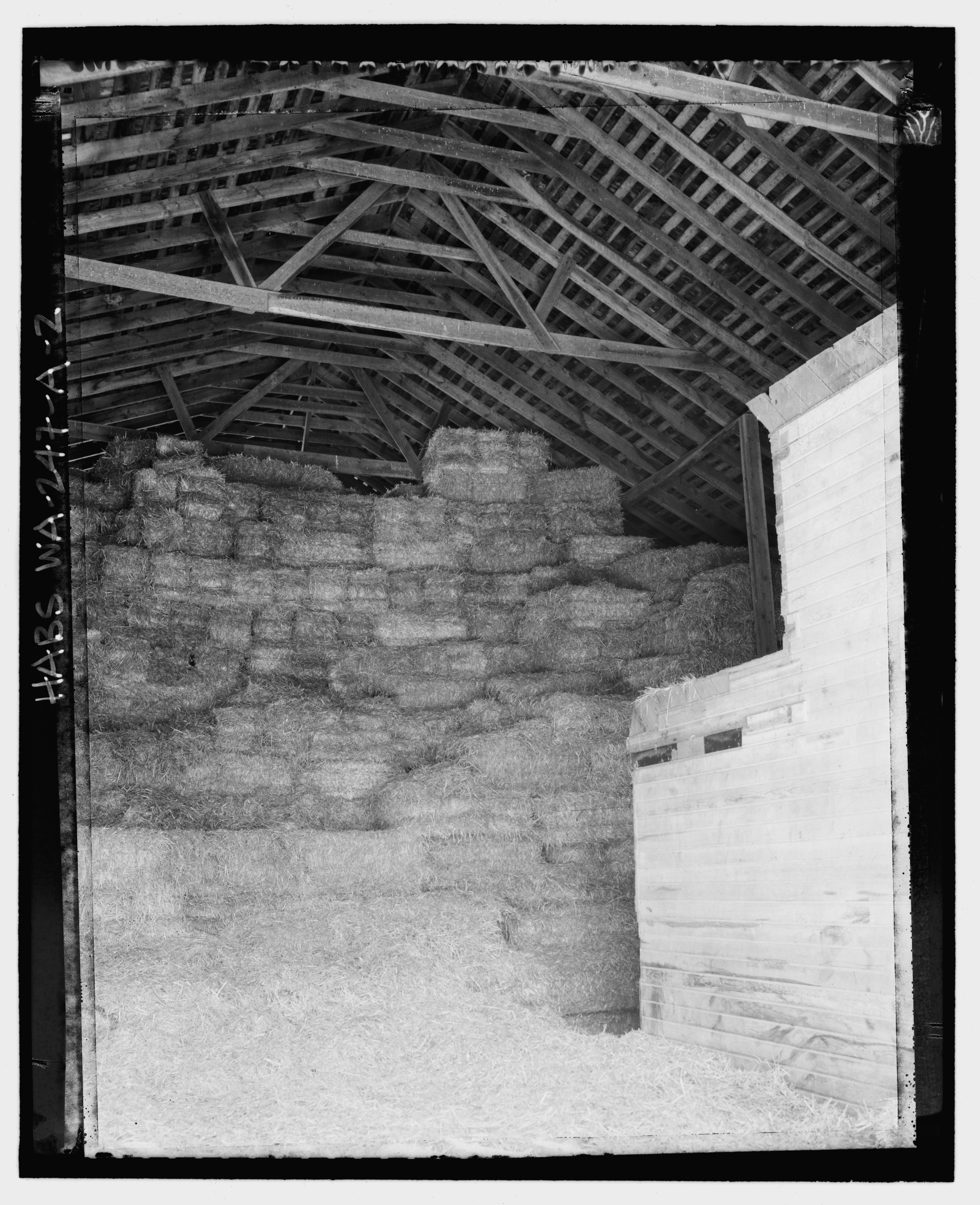
Interior of a barn with a Fink truss, with the characteristic W shape.

Fink design trusses are used today for pedestrian bridges and as roof trusses in building construction in an inverted (upside down) form where the lower chord is present and a central upward projecting vertical member and attached diagonals provide the bases for roofing.
