= Allerton, New Jersey =

Populated place in Hunterdon County, New Jersey, US

- Unincorporated community
- Location in Huntredon County Location in New Jersey Location in the United States
- Coordinates: 40°36′40″N 74°52′43″W
- Country: United States
- State: New Jersey
- County: Hunterdon
- Township: Clinton
- Elevation: 243 ft (74 m)
- Time zone: UTC−05:00 (Eastern (EST))
  - Summer (DST): UTC−04:00 (EDT)
- GNIS feature ID: 874303

Allerton (also known as Allerville) is an unincorporated community located within Clinton Township, in Hunterdon County, in the U.S. state of New Jersey.

The community is centered at Route 31 and Allerton Road, 1.8 miles (2.9 km) west of the Round Valley Reservoir and 3.3 miles (5.3 km) southeast of the Spruce Run Reservoir.

By 1846, Allerton had a store, steam saw mill, Baptist church, chair factory, and a few dwellings.
