= Hamden, New Jersey =

Populated place in Hunterdon County, New Jersey, US

- Unincorporated community
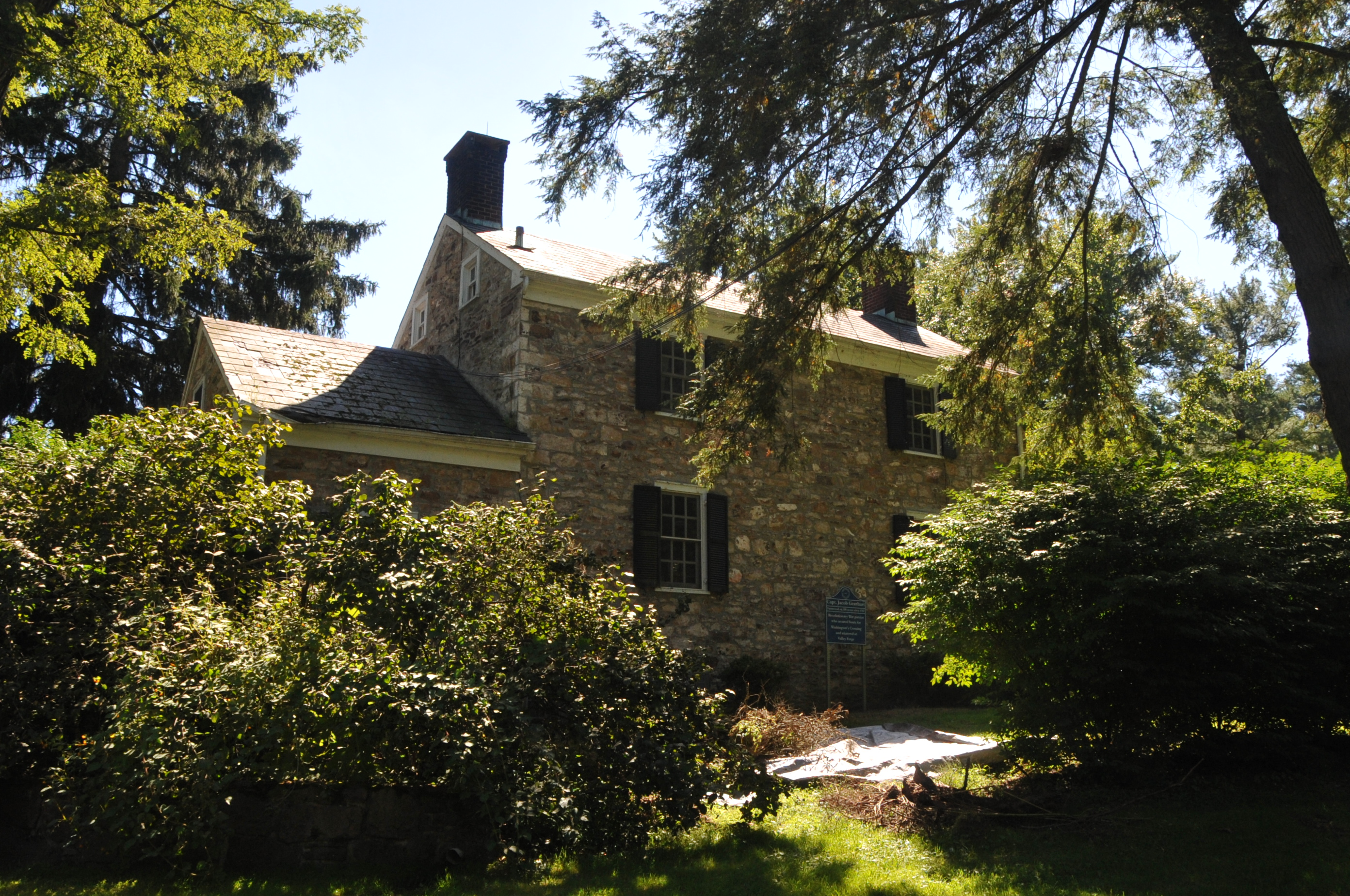
- Captain Jacob Gearhart House

- Hamden's location in Hunterdon County (Inset: Hunterdon County in New Jersey) Hamden (New Jersey) Hamden (the United States)
- Coordinates: 40°36′12″N 74°54′2″W
- Country: United States
- State: New Jersey
- County: Hunterdon
- Township: Clinton
- Elevation: 167 ft (51 m)
- Time zone: UTC−05:00 (Eastern (EST))
  - Summer (DST): UTC−04:00 (EDT)
- GNIS feature ID: 876902

Hamden is an unincorporated community located within Clinton Township, in Hunterdon County, in the U.S. state of New Jersey.

The community is centered just east of the South Branch Raritan River and is situated 3.0 miles (4.8 km) west of the Round Valley Reservoir and 3.0 miles (4.8 km) south-southeast of the Spruce Run Reservoir.

== History ==
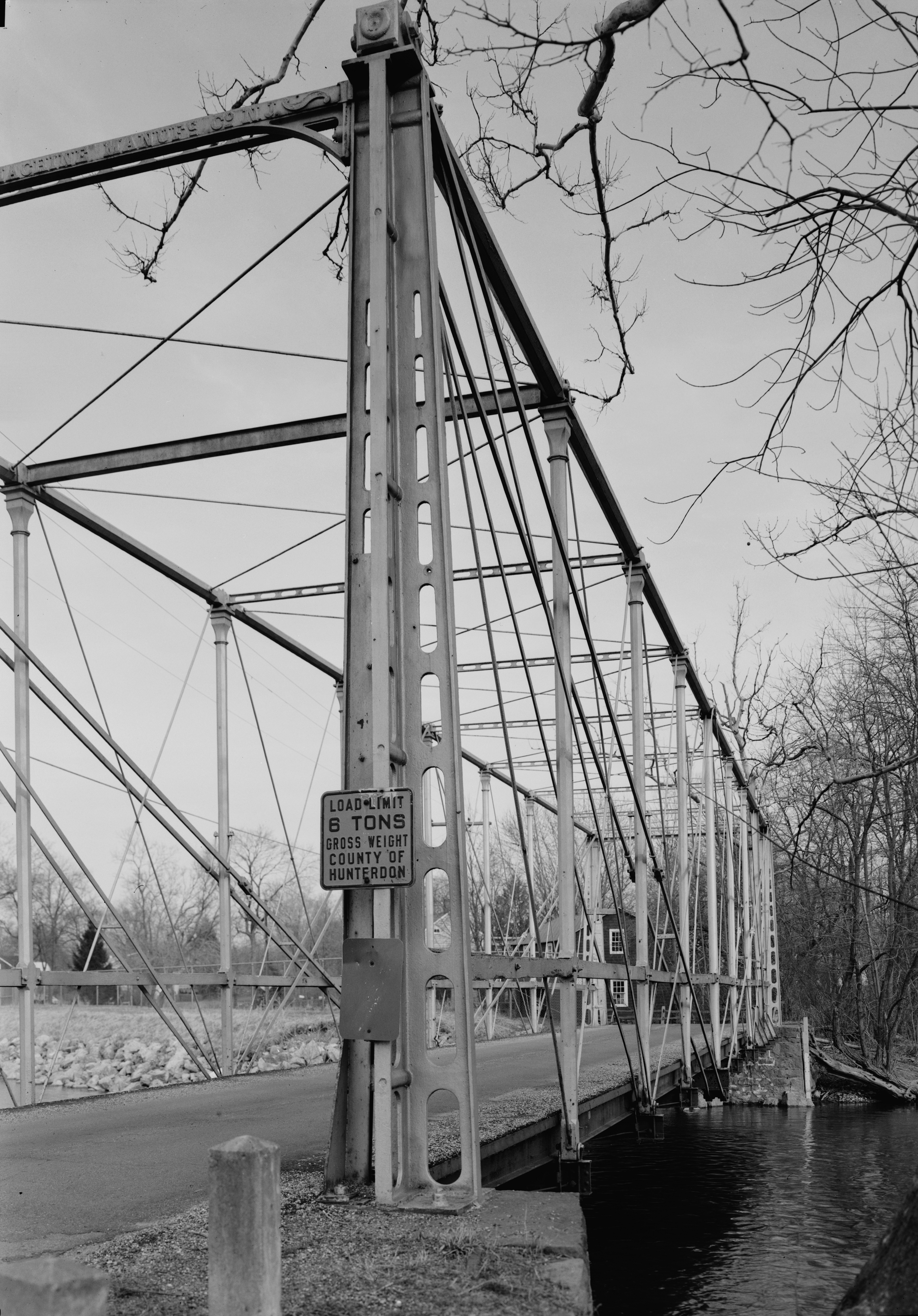
Hamden Bridge

The 1,000-acre (400 ha) Hamden Tract was purchased by Phillip and John Grandin in 1759. The Grandin Grist & Fulling-Mills, a blacksmith shop, and Abbott's Tavern were located here. The farmhouse of Jacob Gearhart (1735–1813), captain in the American Revolutionary War, is located nearby. The 1858 Fink-Type Truss Bridge (Hamden Bridge), listed on the National Register of Historic Places, crossed the river here, until it collapsed in 1978.
