= Highland Park, New Jersey =

Borough in Middlesex County, New Jersey, US

- Borough
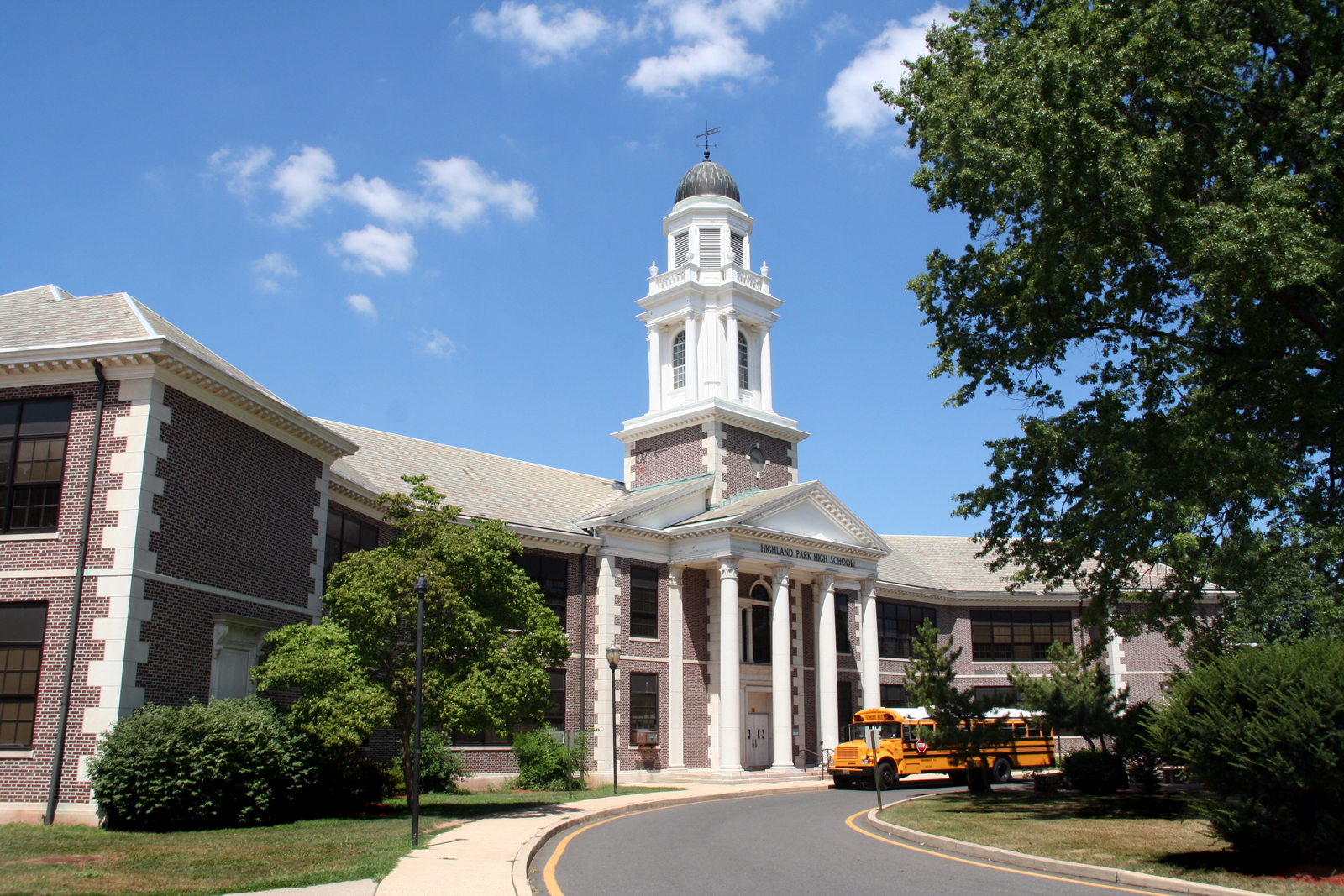
- Highland Park High School

- Seal

- Location of Highland Park in Middlesex County highlighted in red (left). Inset map: Location of Middlesex County in New Jersey highlighted in orange (right).

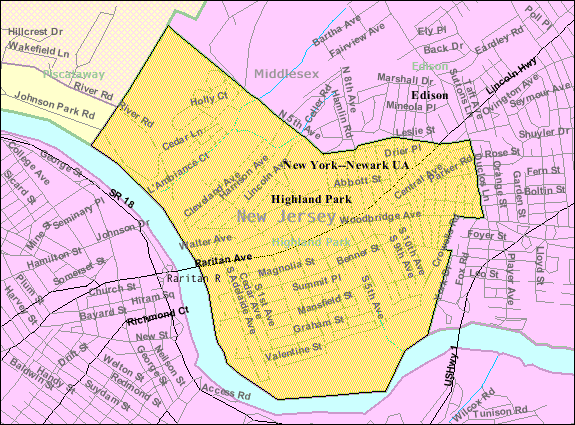
- Census Bureau map of Highland Park, New Jersey

- Location in Middlesex County Location in New Jersey Location in the United States
- Coordinates: 40.500795°N 74.427911°W
- Country: United States
- State: New Jersey
- County: Middlesex
- Incorporated: March 15, 1905

Government
  - Type: Borough
  - Body: Borough Council
  - Mayor: Elsie Foster (D, appointed to unexpired term ending December 31, 2027)
  - Administrator: Teri Jover
  - Municipal clerk: Jennifer Santiago

Area
  - Total: 1.83 sq mi (4.74 km^{2})
  - Land: 1.82 sq mi (4.72 km^{2})
  - Water: 0.0077 sq mi (0.02 km^{2}) 0.44%
  - Rank: 424th of 565 in state 21st of 25 in county
- Elevation: 75 ft (23 m)

Population (2020)
  - Total: 15,072
  - Estimate (2024): 15,386
  - Rank: 174th of 565 in state 16th of 25 in county
  - Density: 8,276.8/sq mi (3,195.7/km^{2})
  - Rank: 46th of 565 in state 3rd of 25 in county
- Time zone: UTC−05:00 (Eastern (EST))
  - Summer (DST): UTC−04:00 (Eastern (EDT))
- ZIP Code: 08904
- Area code: 732 / 908
- FIPS code: 3402331470
- GNIS feature ID: 0885252
- Website: www.hpboro.com

Highland Park is a borough in Middlesex County, in the central region of the U.S. state of New Jersey, in the New York City metropolitan area. The borough is located on the northern banks of the Raritan River, in the Raritan Valley region. As of the 2020 United States census, the borough's population was 15,072, an increase of 1,090 (+7.8%) from the 2010 census count of 13,982, which in turn had reflected a decline of 17 (−0.1%) from the 13,999 counted at the 2000 census.

Highland Park was formed as a borough by an act of the New Jersey Legislature on March 15, 1905, when it broke away from what was then known as Raritan Township (present-day Edison). The borough was named for its location above the Raritan River.

== History ==
The earliest settlers of the land that would become Highland Park were the Lenape Native Americans. They hunted in the hills along the Raritan River, which had trails that crisscrossed the area. The trail helped provide a link between the Delaware River and Hudson River areas. In 1685, John Inian bought land on both shores of the Raritan River and built two new landings downstream from the Assunpink Trail's fording place, which was later developed as Raritan Landing. He established a ferry service, and the main road was then redirected to lead straight to the ferry landing. This river crossing was run by generations of different owners, and a ferry house tavern operated for many years in the 18th century. A toll bridge replaced the ferry in 1795. The wood plank Albany Street Bridge was dismantled in 1848 and reconstructed in 1853. The present-day seven-span stone arch road bridge was built in 1892 and stretches 595 feet (181 m) across the Raritan River to New Brunswick. It became the Lincoln Highway Bridge in 1914 and was widened in 1925.

In the late 17th century, Henry Greenland became one of the area's first European settlers; he owned nearly 400 acres (1.6 km^{2}) of land on the Mill Brook section of the Assunpink Trail, where he operated an inn for travelers. Other early settlers included Captain Francis Drake and other members of the Drake family, relatives of the famous explorer. In the early 18th century, a few wealthy Europeans, including the Van Horns and Merrills, settled on large tracts of land, establishing an isolated farmstead pattern of development that would continue for the next 150 years.

The Reverend John Henry Livingston of the famous Livingston family, newly chosen head of Queen's College (now Rutgers University), purchased a 150-acre (0.61 km^{2}) plot of land in 1809, which would hereafter be known as the Livingston Manor. A gracious Greek Revival house built around 1843 by Robert and Louisa Livingston stands on this property, which remains Highland Park's most prominent historic house. The Livingston Homestead, which is listed in the National Register of Historic Places, was owned by the Waldron family throughout most of the 20th century.

In the early 19th century, both the Delaware & Raritan Canal and a railroad were constructed largely to serve the commercial center of New Brunswick across the river. In 1836, the New Jersey Railroad and Transportation Company built a rail line that terminated on the Highland Park side of the Raritan River and established a station named "East New Brunswick." The Camden and Amboy Railroad built a wood, double-deck bridge, which eliminated the station stop in 1838. It was destroyed by a suspicious fire in 1878. A replacement iron truss bridge was constructed on the existing enlarged stone piers, which in turn was replaced in 1902 by the current twelve-span stone arch bridge encased in concrete in the 1940s.

Despite the canal and the railroad, Highland Park's land continued to be used for agriculture. Residential development slowly began 30 years later. Several stately houses were constructed on Adelaide Avenue, and more modest houses were constructed on Cedar, First, and Second Avenues and Magnolia, Benner, and Johnson Streets. In the 1870s, the small hamlet became better known as "Highland Park", a name derived from the suburban housing development. Although the area adjacent to the railroad tracks continued to be called "East New Brunswick." 1870 was also the year in which Highland Park was annexed to the newly formed township now called Edison, but at the time called Raritan Township.

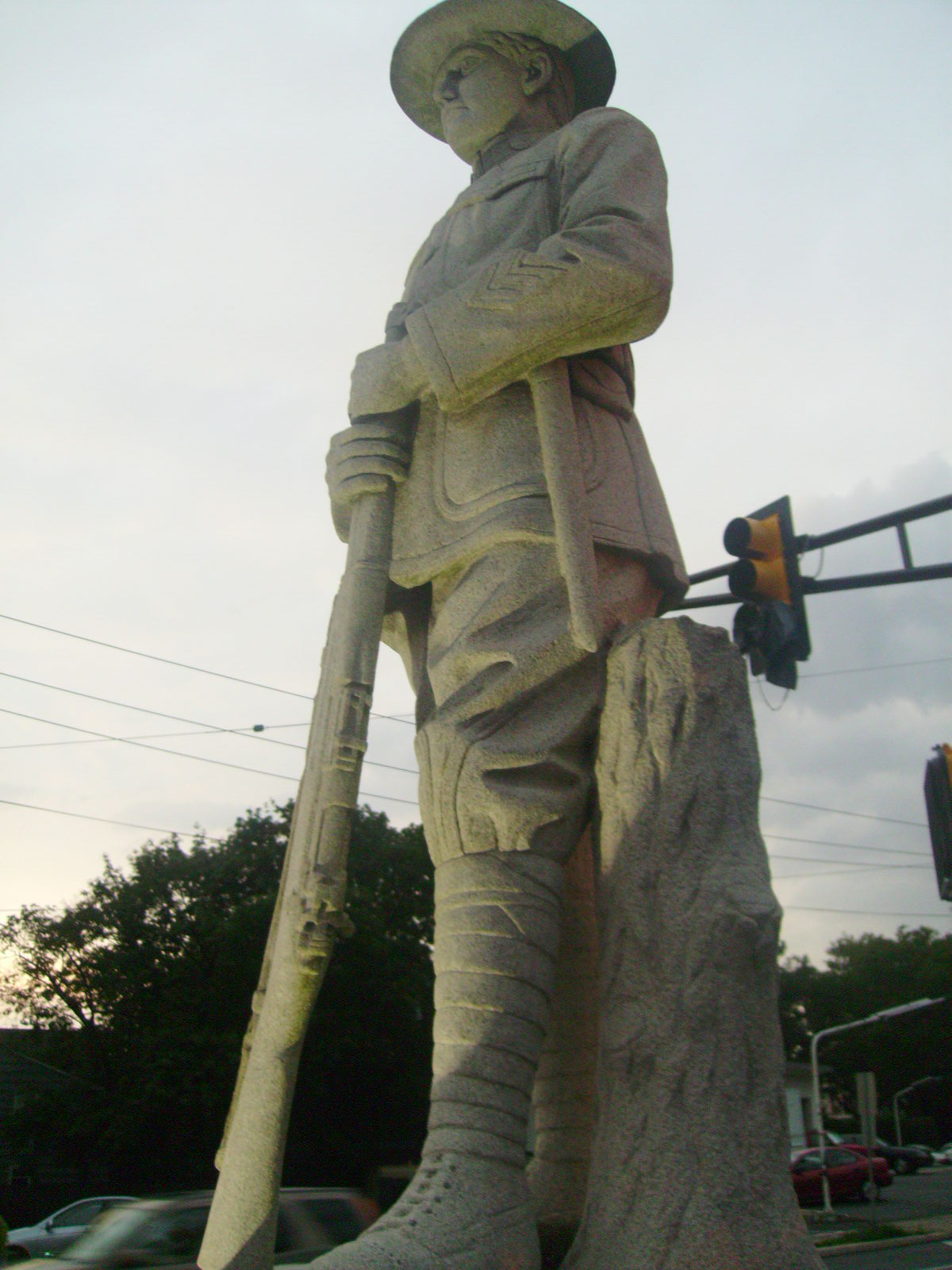
The Doughboy statue in downtown Highland Park

Highland Park had its own school district and on March 15, 1905, the Borough of Highland Park was formed. Highland Park's drive for independence from Raritan Township arose over the issue of public schooling. Residents wanted an independent school system and there was a related dispute over school taxes. The fire department, which had formed in 1899, also wanted more local control over their affairs. The 1905 New Jersey census counted 147 dwellings in the new borough. In 1918, Robert Wood Johnson II was appointed to the Highland Park Council and became mayor in 1920. His summer house and estate was located on River Road, just north of the railroad tracks.

Since its establishment as a borough, Highland Park's lands have been parceled into ever-smaller suburban residential plots. Planned developments included Watson Whittlesey's Livingston Manor development begun in 1906; the Viehmann Tract, also on the north side; Riverview Terrace on the south side; Raritan Park Terrace in the triangle between Raritan and Woodbridge Avenues; and East New Brunswick Heights in the Orchard Heights neighborhood. It has taken years of continuously constructing houses and apartment buildings to create the largely residential borough.

Highland Park's industrial development in the 19th and 20th centuries included such businesses as a brewery, Johnson & Johnson, The John Waldron Machine Company, Turner Tubes, and the Janeway & Carpender Wallpaper factory. The borough is the birthplace of the Band-Aid. and Flako Products packaged mixes for baked goods. However, the industrial nature of the borough completely declined by the 1960s. The commercial zones along both Raritan and Woodbridge Avenues continue to thrive with "mom & pop" shops, many that have lasted for generations.

Throughout the 20th century, Highland Park's religious institutions, educational facilities, and municipal governance have kept pace with the growth of the borough. The trends of local autonomy and control that shaped Highland Park in the past continue to this day.

In 2012, Highland Park became the first municipality in the state to contract a home performance company to help residents consume less energy. The program is a one-of-a-kind program that can offer up to a 30% energy savings for homeowners.

In 2016, Highland Park became the state's first registered HeartSafe community.

=== Livingston Manor Historic District ===
- Livingston Homestead
- U.S. National Register of Historic Places
- U.S. Historic district – Contributing property
- New Jersey Register of Historic Places
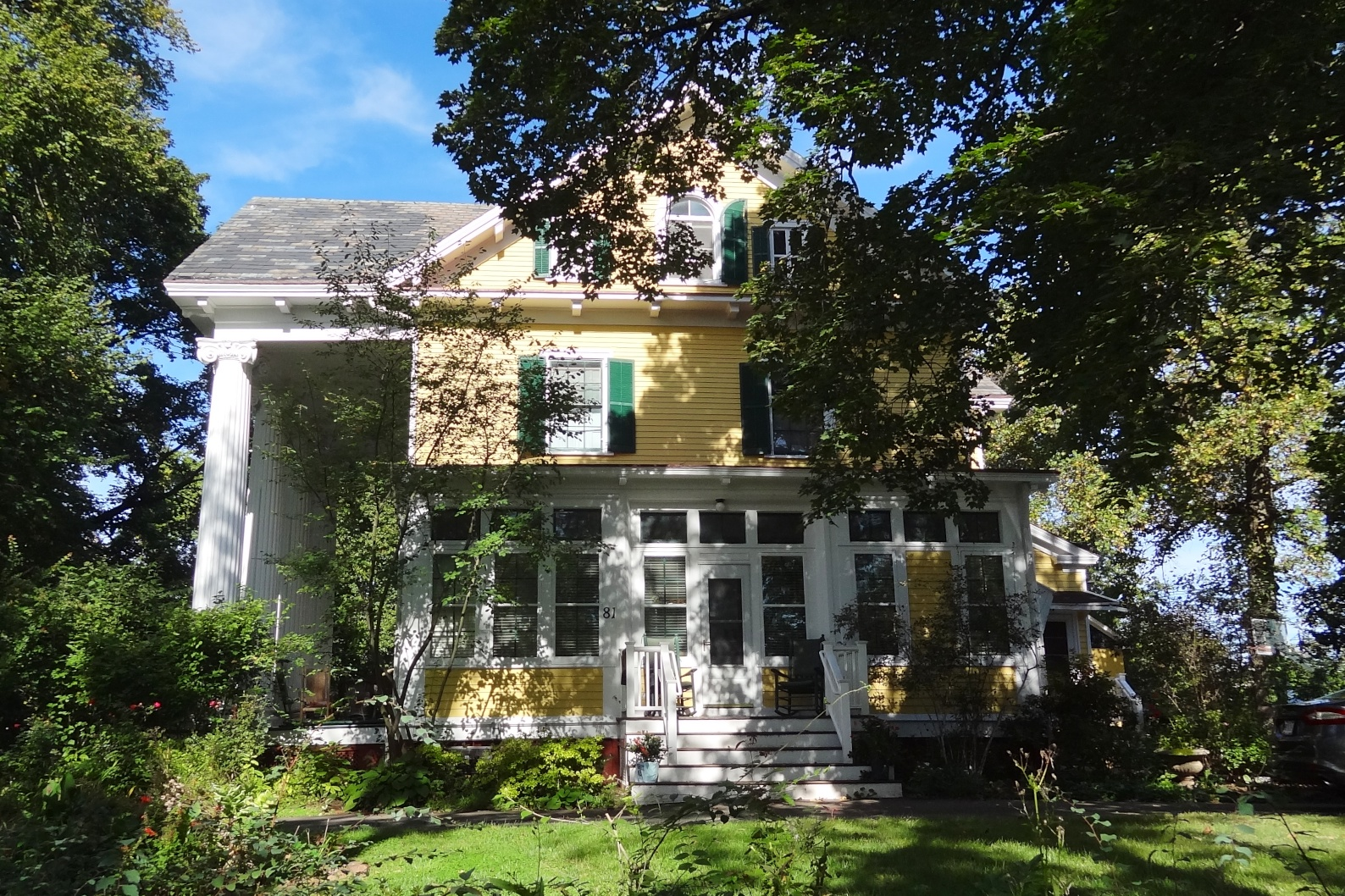

- Location within Middlesex County, New Jersey Location within New Jersey Location within the United States
- Location: 81 Harrison Avenue
- Coordinates: 40°30′08″N 74°26′7″W
- Architectural style: Greek Revival
- Part of: Livingston Manor Historic District (ID04000672)
- NRHP reference No.: 02000215
- NJRHP No.: 3950

Significant dates
- Added to NRHP: March 20, 2002
- Designated CP: July 7, 2004
- Designated NJRHP: December 20, 2001

- Livingston Manor Historic District
- U.S. National Register of Historic Places
- U.S. Historic district
- New Jersey Register of Historic Places
- Location: Parts of Cleveland, Grant, Harrison, Lawrence, Lincoln, Madison, and North Second Avenues and River Road
- Coordinates: 40°30′5″N 74°26′17″W
- NRHP reference No.: 04000672
- NJRHP No.: 4289
- Added to NRHP: July 7, 2004

Livingston Manor was a subdivision built upon the lands surrounding the Livingston Homestead. This subdivision was the brainchild of Watson Whittlesey (1863–1914), a real estate developer born in Rochester, New York. Whittlesey was more than a typical land speculator; he was a community builder, which was noted by his residency in various Livingston Manor houses from 1906 to 1914, and by his active involvement in the municipal affairs of Highland Park. Instead of auctioning lots like his 19th century predecessors, Whittlesey sold subdivided lots with either a house completely built by his company or with the promise of providing a company-constructed house similar to those previously constructed.

The suburban development grew between 1906 and 1925, when Whittlesey's company, the Livingston Manor Corporation and its successor, the Highland Park Building Company, constructed single-family houses from plans produced by a select group of architects. While a variety of building types and styles are present on each block, the buildings in the district are distinguished by the use of specific building plans found nowhere else in Highland Park and by the embellishments that are typical of the Craftsman philosophy, which emphasized the value of the labor of skilled artisans who showed pride in their abilities.

In the first years of this development, the houses were constructed one entire block at a time beginning with the southeast side of Grant Avenue between Lawrence Avenue and North Second Avenue. The next block to be developed was the northwest side of Lincoln Avenue between Lawrence Avenue and North Second Avenue. Six stucco bungalows were then constructed on the southern side of Lawrence east of Lincoln Avenue. As the housing development grew in popularity, houses were constructed less systematically by block, and more often on lots that individual homeowners selected from the remaining available properties. Whittlesey used plans from architects George Edward Krug and Francis George Hasselman, as well as plans generated by several local architects including John Arthur Blish and William Boylan. Several of Livingston Manor's Tudor Revival houses were designed by Highland Park's eminent architect Alexander Merchant. Merchant created numerous buildings in New Brunswick and Highland Park (see list below). Like other early-20th century architects, he was active during the period of early American modernism, but, having trained at the firm of Carrère and Hastings, Merchant developed and maintained a classical design vocabulary.

Many workers in the building trades, such as Harvey E. Dodge, the carpenter Frederick Nietscke and the contractor Harold Richard Segoine, have also been identified as Livingston Manor Corporation employees as well as Livingston Manor residents. Whittlesey, with his wife Anna, also lived in several Livingston Manor houses, including the Spanish Colonial style house at 35 Harrison Avenue designed specifically for them.

On December 1, 1906, the first deeds were transferred to two individual homeowners. Many prominent New Brunswick and Highland Park residents bought houses in this new neighborhood. They included Rutgers College professors, school teachers, bank employees, factory owners, and store owners. Census data show that most of the women were housewives and mothers. There were many extended families. Some families took in boarders and several households included live-in servants. Sixty-two houses had been constructed in Livingston Manor by 1910.

In 1912, Watson Whittlesey hired a sales agent, John F. Green, and began selling bungalow lots. These properties were smaller and less expensive, and a set of plans for a bungalow was given to any purchaser. By 1913, 120 houses had been constructed in Livingston Manor.

Dubbed "Lord of the Manor", Whittlesey created a neighborhood spirit by giving receptions for the residents, by providing playgrounds for the children, and by encouraging the men to take a more active part in public affairs. After his death on April 8, 1914, Manor residents turned out in the hundreds to attend a memorial service at his house.

The Highland Park Building Company was incorporated in 1914 by long-standing members of his company including builder Robert Lufburrow and engineer Harold Richard Segoine. In 1916, Mrs. Whittlesey, who was president of the Livingston Manor Corporation, turned over the privately owned streets, sidewalks, and curbs to the borough. Remarkably, there were no provisions for the borough to accept public ownership of the sewers. That required an act of legislation at the statehouse in Trenton, which was accomplished by Senator Florance and Assemblyman Edgar and signed by Governor Walter Evans Edge the following year. Anna Wilcox Whittlesey, "Lady of the Manor", died on August 16, 1918. She was remembered as "a woman of rare refinement and culture, and the soul of hospitality."

Highland Park's identity as a streetcar suburb was transformed to that of an automobile suburb during the 1920s. By 1922, there had been 210 dwellings constructed in Livingston Manor. The Livingston Manor Corporation continued to have transactions into the 1960s, but the area's significant development had taken place by 1925.

The Livingston Manor is an important neighborhood in Highland Park. The Livingston Manor Historic District was listed in the New Jersey Register of Historic Places on April 1, 2004, and in the National Register of Historic Places on July 7, 2004.

=== Buildings designed by Alexander Merchant ===
Alexander Merchant (1872–1952) designed the following buildings:

- 55 South Adelaide Avenue (1909)
- Lafayette School on South Second Avenue and Benner Street (original school-1907 and Second Avenue wing-1915). The third wing on Second Avenue was designed by Merchant's son Alexander Merchant Jr. in 1952. The Lafayette School is now condominiums and no longer a school.
- Reformed Church of Highland Park on South Second Avenue (original church-1897 and auditorium wing c. 1920)
- Irving School on Central Avenue (original building-1914)
- The Center School on North Third Avenue (formerly the Hamilton School–opened 1915)
- The Pomeranz Building on Raritan Avenue and South Third Avenue (1920)
- 82 Harrison Avenue (1913)
- Two houses on Cliff Court (1914)
- Several houses on South Adelaide Avenue near Cliff Court (1910–1914)
- The Highland Park High School (original building-1926)
- The Masonic Temple on Raritan Avenue at North Fourth Avenue (1923) It remains as a one-story commercial building after a fire on March 10, 1965, destroyed the upper levels of the auditorium and offices.
- The Brody House at corner of Raritan and North Adelaide Avenues (built 1911–demolished 1997)
- The former Police Station at 137 Raritan Avenue (demolished).
- Anshe Emeth Memorial Temple on Livingston Avenue in neighboring New Brunswick (1929)

== Geography ==
According to the United States Census Bureau, the borough had a total area of 1.83 square miles (4.74 km^{2}), including 1.82 square miles (4.72 km^{2}) of land and 0.01 square miles (0.02 km^{2}) of water (0.44%).

The borough received its name for its "park-like" setting, on the "high land" of the banks of the Raritan River, overlooking New Brunswick. Highland Park borders the Middlesex County municipalities of Edison, New Brunswick, and Piscataway.

== Demographics ==
Historical population
Census	Pop.	Note	%±
1910	1,517		—
1920	4,866		220.8%
1930	8,691		78.6%
1940	9,002		3.6%
1950	9,721		8.0%
1960	11,049		13.7%
1970	14,385		30.2%
1980	13,396		−6.9%
1990	13,279		−0.9%
2000	13,999		5.4%
2010	13,982		−0.1%
2020	15,072		7.8%
2024 (est.)	15,386	▲	2.1%
Population sources: 1910–1920; 1910 1910–1930; 1940–2000 2000; 2010 2020

=== 2020 census ===
As of the 2020 census, Highland Park had a population of 15,072. The median age was 35.0 years. 20.2% of residents were under the age of 18 and 14.1% of residents were 65 years of age or older. For every 100 females there were 93.2 males, and for every 100 females age 18 and over there were 91.1 males age 18 and over.

100.0% of residents lived in urban areas, while 0.0% lived in rural areas.

There were 6,320 households in Highland Park, of which 27.6% had children under the age of 18 living in them. Of all households, 41.9% were married-couple households, 21.0% were households with a male householder and no spouse or partner present, and 30.6% were households with a female householder and no spouse or partner present. About 31.5% of all households were made up of individuals and 9.9% had someone living alone who was 65 years of age or older.

There were 6,669 housing units, of which 5.2% were vacant. The homeowner vacancy rate was 1.3% and the rental vacancy rate was 3.9%.

Racial composition as of the 2020 census
Race	Number	Percent
White	8,573	56.9%
Black or African American	1,328	8.8%
American Indian and Alaska Native	91	0.6%
Asian	2,662	17.7%
Native Hawaiian and Other Pacific Islander	10	0.1%
Some other race	1,144	7.6%
Two or more races	1,264	8.4%
Hispanic or Latino (of any race)	2,251	14.9%

=== 2010 census ===
The 2010 United States census counted 13,982 people, 5,875 households, and 3,267 families in the borough. The population density was 7,728.1 per square mile (2,983.8/km^{2}). There were 6,203 housing units at an average density of 3,428.5 per square mile (1,323.8/km^{2}). The racial makeup was 68.26% (9,544) White, 7.83% (1,095) Black or African American, 0.14% (20) Native American, 17.84% (2,495) Asian, 0.03% (4) Pacific Islander, 3.28% (458) from other races, and 2.62% (366) from two or more races. Hispanic or Latino of any race were 8.95% (1,252) of the population.

Of the 5,875 households, 26.0% had children under the age of 18; 43.2% were married couples living together; 9.3% had a female householder with no husband present and 44.4% were non-families. Of all households, 31.4% were made up of individuals and 9.5% had someone living alone who was 65 years of age or older. The average household size was 2.38 and the average family size was 3.10.

21.1% of the population were under the age of 18, 10.2% from 18 to 24, 32.9% from 25 to 44, 24.2% from 45 to 64, and 11.6% who were 65 years of age or older. The median age was 34.8 years. For every 100 females, the population had 92.0 males. For every 100 females ages 18 and older there were 91.0 males.

The Census Bureau's 2006–2010 American Community Survey showed that (in 2010 inflation-adjusted dollars) median household income was $78,821 (with a margin of error of +/− $8,312) and the median family income was $103,316 (+/− $6,807). Males had a median income of $72,533 (+/− $8,231) versus $55,591 (+/− $3,873) for females. The per capita income for the borough was $41,300 (+/− $3,714). About 5.4% of families and 8.9% of the population were below the poverty line, including 9.4% of those under age 18 and 8.8% of those age 65 or over.

=== 2000 census ===
As of the 2000 United States census there were 13,999 people, 5,899 households, and 3,409 families residing in the borough. The population density was 7,614.1 inhabitants per square mile (2,939.8/km^{2}). There were 6,071 housing units at an average density of 3,302.0 per square mile (1,274.9/km^{2}). The racial makeup of the borough was 72.06% White, 7.94% African American, 0.11% Native American, 13.63% Asian, 0.09% Pacific Islander, 3.59% from other races, and 2.59% from two or more races. Hispanic or Latino of any race were 8.18% of the population.

Of residents reporting their ancestry, 9.8% were of Italian, 9.1% Irish, 8.1% German, 7.8% Russian, 7.5% Polish. 66.2% spoke English, 7.2% Spanish, 6.4% Chinese, 2.2% Hebrew, 1.8% Russian, 1.2% Hungarian, 1.1% French and 1.1% Hindi as their language spoken at home.

There were 5,899 households, out of which 27.6% had children under the age of 18 living with them, 46.2% were married couples living together, 8.2% had a female householder with no husband present, and 42.2% were non-families. 31.5% of all households were made up of individuals, and 9.2% had someone living alone who was 65 years of age or older. The average household size was 2.37 and the average family size was 3.06.

In the borough the population was spread out, with 21.7% under the age of 18, 8.8% from 18 to 24, 37.1% from 25 to 44, 20.4% from 45 to 64, and 11.9% who were 65 years of age or older. The median age was 35 years. For every 100 females, there were 93.3 males. For every 100 females age 18 and over, there were 90.4 males age 18 and over.

The median income for a household in the borough was $53,250, and the median income for a family was $71,267. Males had a median income of $47,248 versus $36,829 for females. The per capita income for the borough was $28,767. About 5.3% of families and 8.4% of the population were below the poverty line, including 7.7% of those under age 18 and 9.6% of those age 65 or over.

== Community ==
Highland Park has at times been a bedroom community for nearby Rutgers University and Johnson & Johnson in New Brunswick, with a resulting academic flair to the community. Nobel laureate Selman Waksman (Medicine, 1952) lived in the borough until he moved to Piscataway in 1954, and laureate Arno Penzias (Physics, 1978) lived in the borough until the 1990s.

There is a new state-of-the-art environmental center on River Road, just a few hundred feet upstream from the Albany Street Bridge. The borough's Environmental Commission envisions this center as a stop along a riverbank walking trail that would link Johnson Park with Donaldson Park and beyond, to the Meadows environmental area on the Edison border.

The planned Highland Park River Greenway trail along the Raritan River would bring residents and visitors, both pedestrians and bicycles, to the 1 mile (1.6 km) trail along the river. The trail would be part of the East Coast Greenway.

In 1978, Highland Park became the first municipality in New Jersey to have an eruv, a symbolic enclosure that allows Orthodox Jews to perform certain activities outdoors on the Sabbath that would be otherwise prohibited. Through an arrangement with New Jersey Bell (now Verizon), a continuous wire was strung from pole to pole around portions of the borough. Eventually this expanded and includes portions of Edison and connects with New Brunswick. The wires are inspected every Friday to ensure that the connections are complete. When intact, this eruv satisfies most Orthodox Jewish religious requirements allowing residents to carry objects during the Sabbath.

== Government ==
=== Local government ===
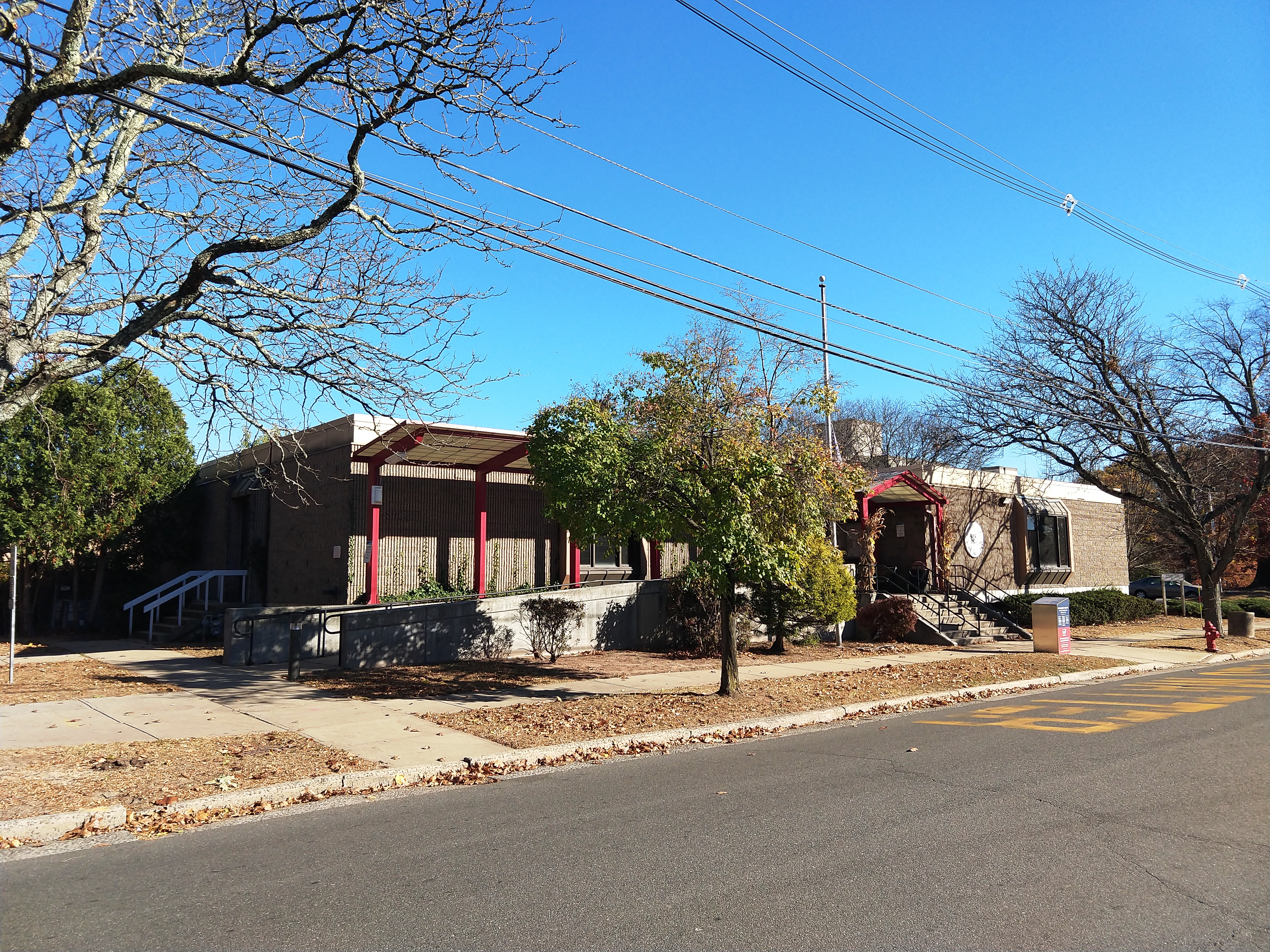
Highland Park Borough Hall

Highland Park is governed under the borough form of New Jersey municipal government, which is used in 218 (of the 564) municipalities statewide, making it the most common form of government in New Jersey. The governing body is comprised of a mayor and a borough council, with all positions elected at-large on a partisan basis as part of the November general election. A mayor is elected directly by the voters to a four-year term of office. The borough council includes six members elected to serve three-year terms on a staggered basis, with two seats coming up for election each year in a three-year cycle. The borough form of government used by Highland Park is a "weak mayor / strong council" government in which council members act as the legislative body with the mayor presiding at meetings and voting only in the event of a tie. The mayor can veto ordinances subject to an override by a two-thirds majority vote of the council. The mayor makes committee and liaison assignments for council members, and most appointments are made by the mayor with the advice and consent of the council.

The borough operates through Committees of the Council: Administration, Finance, Public Works, Public Safety, Community Affairs, Public Utilities, and Health, Welfare and Recreation. The various departments, boards and commissions report to the council through these committees. All elected positions are part-time; the mayor and council members typically hold outside jobs, and receive small salaries from their elected offices.

As of 2026, the mayor of Highland Park is Democrat Elsie Foster, whose term of office ending on December 31, 2027. Members of the Borough Council are Council President Stephany Kim-Choban (D, 2027), Philip G. George (D, 2028), Matthew L. Hale (D, 2028), Matthew Hersh (D, 2026) and Jason Postelnik (D, 2026) and Norma Iris Vargas (D, 2027).

In January 2023, the borough council appointed Elsie Foster to fill the vacant seat expiring in December 2023 that had been held by Gayle Brill Mittler until she resigned from office the previous month citing a desire for more time with her family. The next month, Jason Postelnik was appointed to the council seat expiring in December 2023 that was vacated by Elsie Foster when she took office as mayor.

In January 2017, the borough council selected Matthew Hersh to fill the seat expiring in December 2019 that became vacant following the death of Jon Erickson the previous October before Election Day; Erickson's name remained on the ballot and he was elected to serve the three-year term. Hersh had been appointed to serve the balance of Erickson's previous term that expired in December 2016. In July 2018, Hersh resigned to accept a position with a state agency and was replaced by Matthew Hale.

==== Mayors ====
The mayors are:

- James B. Archer (D), 1905–1907.
- Lorenz Volkert (R), 1908–1913.
- George White (D), 1914–1915.
- Russell E. Watson (R), 1916–1919.
- Robert Wood Johnson II (R), 1920–1921.
- Cornelius B. McCrelis Jr. (R), 1922–1923.
- George F. Leonard (D), 1924–1925.
- Benjamin Erickson (R), 1926–1928.
- Edwin W. Eden (R), 1928–1929.
- Richard T. Parker (R), 1930–1931.
- Irving D. Buttler (R), 1932–1935.
- Russell C. Smalley (R), 1936–1937.
- Russell B. Howell, 1938–1939.
- Walter K. Wood, 1940–1941.
- Harold W. Drake (R), 1942–1946.
- George W. Miller (R), 1946–1948.
- Alvah H. Cole (R), 1948–1951.
- Joseph C. DeCoster (D), 1952–1953.
- William C. Campbell (D), 1954–1955.
- Luther H. Martin (D), 1956–1959.
- Samuel J. Kronman (D), 1960–1965.
- Herbert M. Tanzman (D), 1966–1969.
- Samuel J. Kronman (D), 1970–1971.
- Gasper Paul Beck (D), 1972–1975.
- Harold "Hesh" Berman (D), 1976–1979.
- Charles W. Muhollen (D), 1980–1983.
- Harold "Hesh" Berman (D), 1984–1987.
- Jeffrey M.Orbach (R), 1988–1991.
- H. James Polos (D), 1992–1999.
- Meryl Frank (D), 2000–2010 (resigned office).
- Steve Nolan (D), 2010–2012.
- Gary Minkoff (D), 2013–2014 (resigned office).
- Padraic Millet (D), 2014 (acting)
- Gayle Brill Mittler (D), 2014–2022. Re-elected on November 5, 2019, to serve another 4-year term, which would expire on December 31, 2023; she resigned in December 2022.
- Elsie Foster (D), 2023–present after being appointed to fill Gayle Britt Mittler's vacant seat

=== Federal, state and county representation ===
Highland Park is located in the 6th Congressional District and is part of New Jersey's 18th state legislative district.

For the 119th United States Congress, New Jersey's 6th congressional district is represented by Frank Pallone (D, Long Branch). New Jersey is represented in the United States Senate by Democrats Cory Booker (Newark, term ends 2027) and Andy Kim (Moorestown, term ends 2031).

For the 2026–2027 session, the 18th legislative district of the New Jersey Legislature is represented in the State Senate by Patrick J. Diegnan (D, South Plainfield) and in the General Assembly by Robert Karabinchak (D, Edison) and Sterley Stanley (D, East Brunswick).

Middlesex County is governed by a Board of County Commissioners, whose seven members are elected at-large on a partisan basis to serve three-year terms of office on a staggered basis, with either two or three seats coming up for election each year as part of the November general election. At an annual reorganization meeting held in January, the board selects from among its members a commissioner director and deputy director. As of 2025, Middlesex County's Commissioners (with party affiliation, term-end year, and residence listed in parentheses) are:

Director Ronald G. Rios (D, Carteret, 2027), Deputy Director Shanti Narra (D, North Brunswick, 2027), Claribel A. "Clary" Azcona-Barber (D, New Brunswick, 2025), Charles Kenny (D, Woodbridge Township, 2025), Leslie Koppel (D, Monroe Township, 2026), Chanelle Scott McCullum (D, Piscataway, 2025) and Charles E. Tomaro (D, Edison, 2026).

Constitutional officers are: Clerk Nancy Pinkin (D, 2025, East Brunswick), Sheriff Mildred S. Scott (D, 2025, Piscataway) and Surrogate Claribel Cortes (D, 2026; North Brunswick).

=== Politics ===
As of March 2011, there were a total of 8,506 registered voters in Highland Park, of which 5,082 (59.7%) were registered as Democrats, 634 (7.5%) were registered as Republicans and 2,776 (32.6%) were registered as Unaffiliated. There were 14 voters registered as Libertarians or Greens.

United States presidential election results for Highland Park
Year	Republican		Democratic		Third party(ies)	
Year	No.	%	No.	%	No.	%
2024	1,794	26.36%	4,772	70.10%	241	3.54%
2020	1,533	21.80%	5,379	76.50%	119	1.69%
2016	1,211	19.81%	4,619	75.56%	283	4.63%
2012	1,528	24.86%	4,470	72.73%	148	2.41%
2008	1,667	25.80%	4,699	72.72%	96	1.49%
2004	1,669	26.54%	4,550	72.35%	70	1.11%
2000	941	16.39%	4,374	76.20%	425	7.40%

In the 2012 presidential election, Democrat Barack Obama received 72.7% of the vote (4,470 cast), ahead of Republican Mitt Romney with 24.9% (1,528 votes), and other candidates with 2.4% (148 votes), among the 6,191 ballots cast by the borough's 9,052 registered voters (45 ballots were spoiled), for a turnout of 68.4%. In the 2008 presidential election, Democrat Barack Obama received 72.1% of the vote (4,699 cast), ahead of Republican John McCain with 25.6% (1,667 votes) and other candidates with 1.5% (96 votes), among the 6,518 ballots cast by the borough's 9,072 registered voters, for a turnout of 71.8%. In the 2004 presidential election, Democrat John Kerry received 72.0% of the vote here (4,550 ballots cast), outpolling Republican George W. Bush with 26.4% (1,669 votes) and other candidates with 0.8% (70 votes), among the 6,319 ballots cast by the borough's 8,507 registered voters, for a turnout percentage of 74.3.

Gubernatorial election results for Highland Park
Year	Republican		Democratic		Third party(ies)	
Year	No.	%	No.	%	No.	%
2025	1,347	23.24%	4,415	76.16%	35	0.60%
2021	882	20.54%	3,333	77.62%	79	1.84%
2017	761	18.72%	2,801	68.91%	503	12.37%
2013	1,294	33.86%	2,449	64.08%	79	2.07%
2009	1,125	26.25%	2,842	66.31%	319	7.44%
2005	955	21.99%	3,231	74.40%	157	3.62%

In the 2013 gubernatorial election, Democrat Barbara Buono received 64.1% of the vote (2,449 cast), ahead of Republican Chris Christie with 33.9% (1,294 votes), and other candidates with 2.1% (79 votes), among the 3,867 ballots cast by the borough's 9,065 registered voters (45 ballots were spoiled), for a turnout of 42.7%. In the 2009 gubernatorial election, Democrat Jon S. Corzine received 65.7% of the vote here (2,842 ballots cast), ahead of Republican Chris Christie with 26.0% (1,125 votes), Independent Chris Daggett with 6.5% (280 votes) and other candidates with 0.9% (39 votes), among the 4,329 ballots cast by the borough's 8,342 registered voters, yielding a 51.9% turnout.

United States Senate election results for Highland Park1
Year	Republican		Democratic		Third party(ies)	
Year	No.	%	No.	%	No.	%
2024	1,574	24.02%	4,728	72.14%	252	3.84%
2018	1,089	19.60%	4,271	76.89%	195	3.51%
2012	1,239	21.22%	4,435	75.94%	166	2.84%
2006	898	20.85%	3,308	76.81%	101	2.35%

United States Senate election results for Highland Park2
Year	Republican		Democratic		Third party(ies)	
Year	No.	%	No.	%	No.	%
2020	1,492	21.52%	5,259	75.84%	183	2.64%
2014	687	19.22%	2,818	78.85%	69	1.93%
2013	580	19.94%	2,303	79.17%	26	0.89%
2008	1,386	22.84%	4,547	74.95%	134	2.21%

== Education ==
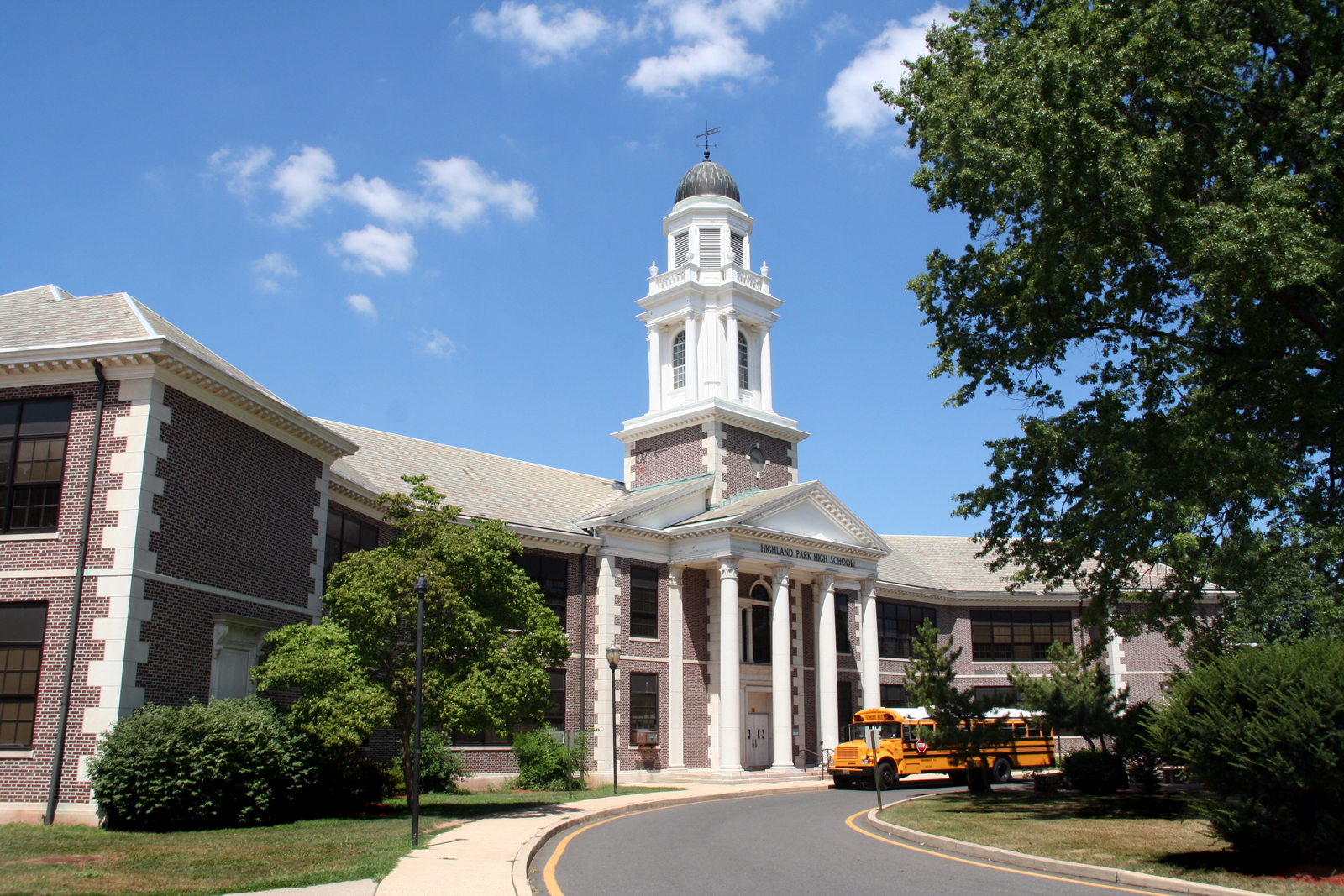
Highland Park High School

The Highland Park Public Schools serve students in pre-kindergarten through twelfth grade. As of the 2023–24 school year, the district, comprised of four schools, had an enrollment of 1,635 students and 155.5 classroom teachers (on an FTE basis), for a student–teacher ratio of 10.5:1. Schools in the district (with 2023–24 enrollment data from the National Center for Education Statistics) are Irving Primary School with 297 students in grades PreK–1, Bartle Elementary School with 433 students in grades 2–5, Highland Park Middle School with 346 students in grades 6–8 and Highland Park High School with 518 students in grades 9–12.

The community is also served by the Greater Brunswick Charter School, a K–8 charter school serving students from Highland Park, Edison, Milltown and New Brunswick. As of the 2023–24 school year, the district, comprised of one school, had an enrollment of 403 students and 23.0 classroom teachers (on an FTE basis), for a student–teacher ratio of 17.5:1.

Eighth grade students from all of Middlesex County are eligible to apply to attend the high school programs offered by the Middlesex County Magnet Schools, a county-wide vocational school district that offers full-time career and technical education at its schools in East Brunswick, Edison, Perth Amboy, Piscataway and Woodbridge Township, with no tuition charged to students for attendance.

The Center School serves students with learning and emotional challenges in grades K–12. Founded in 1971 in Bound Brook, the school moved in 1989 to a former public school building in Highland Park. A fire in the school's building in February 2012 forced the school to relocate to Branchburg Township on an interim basis.

== Transportation ==
=== Roads and highways ===
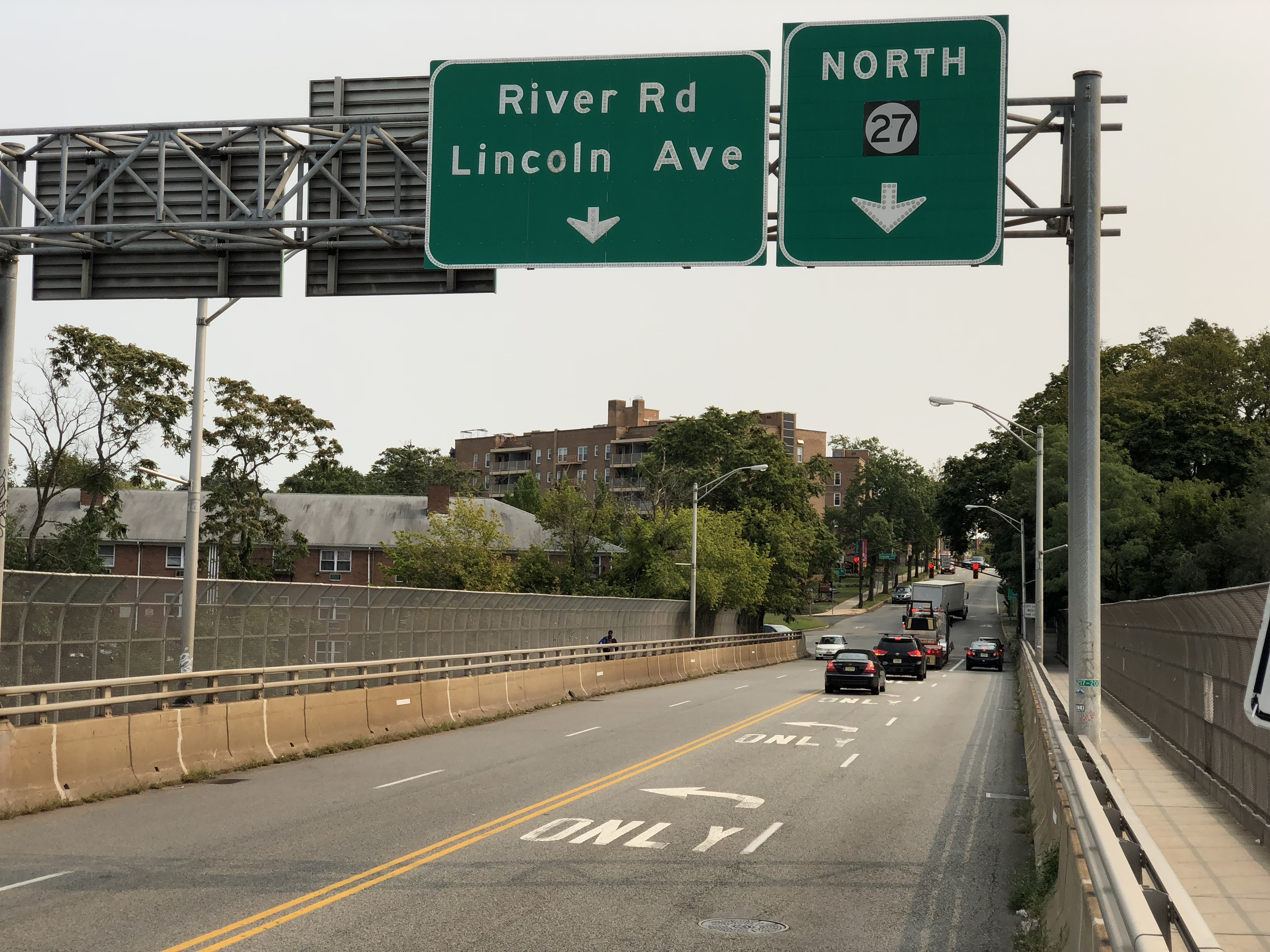
Route 27 and County Route 514 entering Highland Park on the Albany Street Bridge

As of May 2010, the borough had a total of 31.46 miles (50.63 km) of roadways, of which 27.85 miles (44.82 km) were maintained by the municipality, 2.22 miles (3.57 km) by Middlesex County, and 1.39 miles (2.24 km) by the New Jersey Department of Transportation.

There are five main roads in Highland Park:

- New Jersey Route 27 – Known as Raritan Avenue, it traverses for about 1.5 miles (2.4 km) through downtown and the outskirts of Highland Park. The section between Adelaide and Fifth Avenues runs virtually east to west and divides the town into the north and south sides.
- County Route 514 – Enters Highland Park concurrent with Route 27, then heads eastward on Woodbridge Avenue at South Sixth Avenue. It runs through the southeast region of the borough.
- Middlesex County Route 622 – River Road in Highland Park, stretches for over 1 mile (1.6 km) in the western region of the borough following the curving bank of the Raritan River.
- Middlesex County Route 676 – This is Duclos Lane and it forms a portion of Highland Park's eastern border with Edison. Road spends 0.49 miles (0.79 km) in Highland Park.
- Middlesex County Route 692 – Cedar Lane in the northern section of the borough intersects with River Road.

U.S. Route 1 and New Jersey Route 18 are accessible close to Highland Park, just beyond its southeastern and southwestern borders.

=== Public transportation ===
NJ Transit local bus service is provided on the 810 and 814 routes.

Atlantic City weekend service is available on Suburban Transit's 700 route.

NJ Transit northbound trains to New York Penn Station, and southbound to the Trenton Transit Center via the Northeast Corridor Line can be found at nearby New Brunswick station and Edison station.

== Wildlife ==
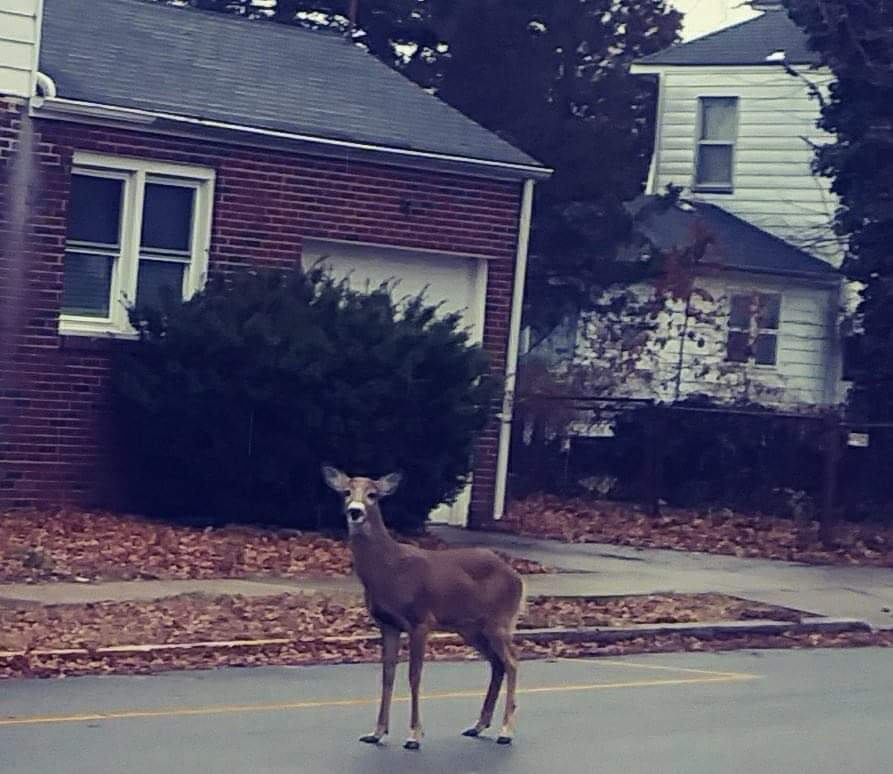
A deer in the street in Highland Park

White-tailed deer are common enough in and around Highland Park to be seen as a problem. A deer population survey, which includes Highland Park, was conducted by Raritan Valley Community College in December 2019; the borough's government was using this survey in 2020 as it made plans for deer management.

== Notable people ==
People who were born in, residents of, or otherwise closely associated with Highland Park include:

- Adele Astaire (1896–1981), acclaimed vaudeville and musical theater dancer, actress
- Fred Astaire (1899–1987), dancer, singer, actor, recipient of three Emmy and three Golden Globe Awards and an honorary Academy Award
- Jim Axelrod (born 1963), CBS news correspondent
- Harvey Jerome Brudner (1931–2009), engineer and inventor
- David Clewell (1955–2020), poet and creative writing instructor at Webster University who served as the Poet Laureate of Missouri
- Earle Dickson (1892–1961), inventor of the Band-Aid
- Nancy Dorian (1936–2024), linguist who carried out research into the decline of the East Sutherland dialect of Scottish Gaelic
- Kirk Douglas (born Issur Danielovitch; 1916–2020), actor, producer, director, philanthropist and writer
- Michael Douglas (born 1944), actor, director and producer
- Samuel G. Freedman, author and columnist for The New York Times
- Willie Garson (1964–2021), actor best known for his role as Stanford Blatch in Sex and the City
- Israel Gelfand (1913–2009), renowned mathematician
- Rebecca Goldstein (born 1950), author, philosopher, and 1996 MacArthur "Genius Award" winner
- Alan Guth (born 1947), physicist and cosmologist
- Dwayne Haskins (1997–2022), American football quarterback
- Amy Herzog, playwright
- John Hulme (born 1987), author of the book series The Seems and director of the documentary Blood, Sweat & Tears: A Basketball Exorcism
- John Seward Johnson II (1930–2020), sculptor and founder of the Johnson Atelier in Hamilton Township, Mercer County, New Jersey
- Robert Wood Johnson II (1893–1968), Johnson & Johnson President, general and philanthropist, who served as mayor of Highland Park from 1920 to 1922
- Soterios Johnson, WNYC radio host
- Lincoln Jones (1933–2013), US Army major general
- Seth Kaper-Dale, Protestant pastor who was a Green Party candidate in the New Jersey gubernatorial election, 2017
- Sacha Killeya-Jones (born 1998), American-British basketball player for Hapoel Gilboa Galil of the Israeli Basketball Premier League
- Sheldon Lavin (1932–2023), CEO and chairman of meat processor OSI Group
- Jerry Levine (born 1957), actor and director of television and theater, best known for appearing on Will & Grace and in the films Teen Wolf and Casual Sex?
- Roy Lichtenstein (1923–1997), pop artist who moved to a home at 66 South Adelaide Avenue in 1960
- Seth Mandel (born 1982), conservative author who is editor of The Washington Examiner
- Tomás Eloy Martínez (1934–2010), journalist and writer, professor and director of the department of Latin American Studies at Rutgers, author of Santa Evita and The Peron Novel
- Suzy Parker (1932–2003), fashion model and actress
- Arno Allan Penzias (1933–2024), physicist and a co-winner of the 1978 Nobel Prize in physics
- Susan Pitt (1948–2024), competition swimmer and world record-holder in the 200-meter butterfly
- Stav Prodromou (born 1944), businessman who was the founder and former chief executive officer of Poqet Computer Corporation
- George T. Reynolds (1917–2005), physicist best known for his work in particle physics, biophysics and environmental science
- Susana Rotker (1954–2000), Venezuelan journalist, columnist, essayist and writer
- Rudy Rucker (born 1946), mathematician, computer scientist and science fiction author, best known for the novels in the Ware Tetralogy
- Neil Sloane (born 1939), mathematician, creator and maintainer of the On-Line Encyclopedia of Integer Sequences
- L. J. Smith (born 1980), former NFL tight end
- Joan Snyder (born 1940), pioneering neo-expressionist feminist artist and 2007 MacArthur "Genius Award" winner
- Ulrich P. Strauss (1920–2015), Rutgers University chemist and 1971 Guggenheim Fellow
- Darrell K. Sweet (1934–2011), illustrator best known for cover art for science fiction and fantasy novels
- Endre Szemerédi (born 1940), mathematician who was the 2012 winner of the Abel Prize
- Norman Tanzman (1918–2004), politician who served in the New Jersey General Assembly from 1962 to 1968 and in the New Jersey Senate from 1968 to 1974
- Olga Von Till (1897–1996), classical pianist and piano teacher
- Alan Voorhees (1922–2005), engineer and urban planner
- Selman Waksman (1888–1973), biochemist and microbiologist who won the Nobel Prize for his work on antibiotics including Streptomycin for treating tuberculosis
