= Highland Park High School (New Jersey) =

High school in New Jersey, United States

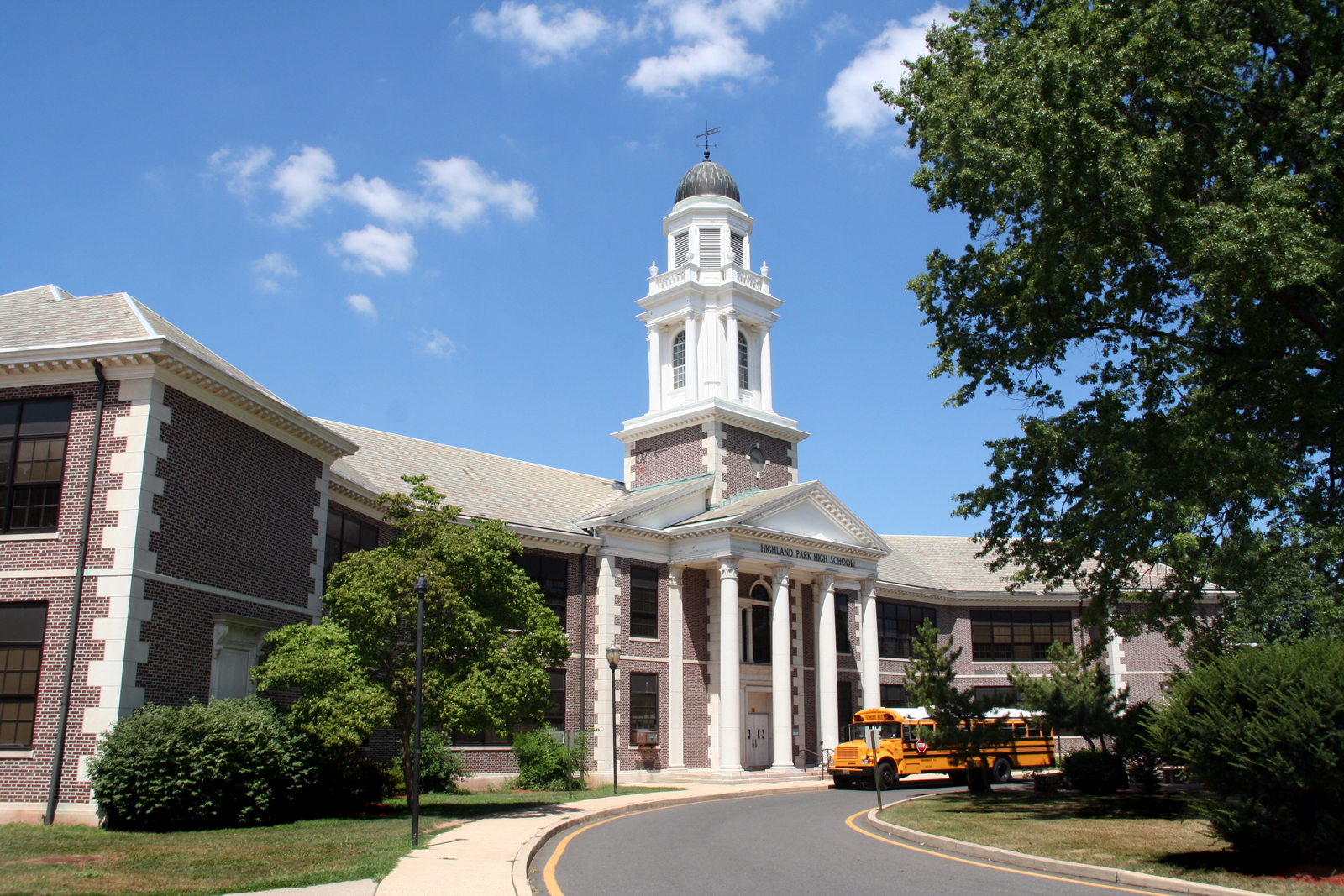

Location
- 102 North Fifth Avenue; Highland Park, Middlesex County, New Jersey 08904; United States
- 40.501676°N 74.424563°W

Information
- Type: Public
- Established: September 1926
- School district: Highland Park Public Schools
- NCES School ID: 340717003372
- Principal: Kristina Donovan
- Faculty: 42.0 FTEs
- Grades: 9-12
- Enrollment: 493 (as of 2024–25)
- Student to teacher ratio: 11.7:1
- Colors: Cardinal and white
- Athletics conference: Greater Middlesex Conference (general); Big Central Football Conference (football)
- Team name: Owls
- Rival: Metuchen High School
- Accreditation: Middle States Association of Colleges and Schools
- Newspaper: The Highland Fling
- Yearbook: The Albadome
- Website: hs.hpschools.net/o/hs

Highland Park High School (HPHS) is a four-year comprehensive public high school that serves students in ninth through twelfth grades from the borough of Highland Park, in Middlesex County, in the U.S. state of New Jersey, as the lone secondary school of the Highland Park Public Schools system.

The school has been accredited by the Middle States Association of Colleges and Schools Commission on Elementary and Secondary Schools since 1940.

As of the 2024–25 school year, the school had an enrollment of 493 students and 42.0 classroom teachers (on an FTE basis), for a student–teacher ratio of 11.7:1. There were 172 students (34.9% of enrollment) eligible for free lunch and 28 (5.7% of students) eligible for reduced-cost lunch.

== History ==
The original school building was designed by architect Alexander Merchant. Opened in September 1926, the school was named Franklin Junior High School, serving students through tenth grade and constructed at a cost of $360,000 (equivalent to $6.5 million in 2025). After appeals from residents, grades 11 and 12 were added and the building was renamed "Highland Park High School" in 1937, before which students from Highland Park completed their secondary school education at either New Brunswick High School or Metuchen High School.

Later additions to the facility include the Science and Math wing in 1958; the English wing in 1968; the library and arts wing in the 1980s; and the cafeteria and a connected middle school (grades 6, 7, and 8) in 1996. Student population peaked in the 1960s, with a population in the 900s.

== Awards, recognition and rankings ==
The school was the 74th-ranked public high school in New Jersey out of 339 schools statewide in New Jersey Monthly magazine's September 2014 cover story on the state's "Top Public High Schools", using a new ranking methodology. The school had been ranked 67th in the state of 328 schools in 2012, after being ranked 37th in 2010 out of 322 schools listed. The magazine ranked the school 50th in 2008 out of 316 schools. The school was ranked 31st in the magazine's September 2006 issue, which included 316 schools across the state. Schooldigger.com ranked the school tied for 184th out of 381 public high schools statewide in its 2011 rankings (an increase of 54 positions from the 2010 ranking) which were based on the combined percentage of students classified as proficient or above proficient on the two components of the High School Proficiency Assessment (HSPA), mathematics (79.0%) and language arts literacy (93.3%).

In 2018, Highland Park High School received the Gold Ranking by U.S. News & World Report, ranked 17th-best high school in New Jersey and 397th in the nation.

Also in 2018, the school won the ShopRite Cup for the best Group I sports program in New Jersey.

In 2008, two students were National Merit Finalists, twelve were National Merit Commended Scholars, and eleven were Bloustein Distinguished Scholars.

In 2005, a team of three HPHS students were recognized as First Place National Finalists in the 13th Annual Toshiba/NSTA ExploraVision Awards science competition for their innovative design of a satellite-based earthquake and tsunami detection/prediction system.

== Extracurricular activities ==
Extracurricular programs at HPHS include multiple instrumental music programs, drama club and tech crew, SAGA (the Sexuality and Gender Alliance), The Highland Fling (school newspaper), a Model United Nations and Model Congress Program, which participates at the Rutgers University Model UN and Congress conferences, as well as Philadelphia Model Congress, Dead Center (literary magazine), and the Albadome (yearbook). The school also has a DECA chapter, which competes in New Jersey's Blue Division. The HPHS academic teams compete in many all-state competitions such as Science League, Math League, and the News 12-sponsored NJ Challenge. These teams excel, having won top-10 plaques in past years.

=== WVHP-FM ===
Beginning in 1971, the high school had a ten-watt FM radio station, WVHP, the voice of Highland Park, that broadcast from 6AM to 8AM and 5PM to 10:30PM Monday through Friday.

== Athletics ==
Highland Park High School Owls compete in the Greater Middlesex Conference, which is comprised of public and private high schools in the Middlesex County area and operates under the supervision of the New Jersey State Interscholastic Athletic Association (NJSIAA). With 348 students in grades 10-12, the school was classified by the NJSIAA for the 2019–20 school year as Group I for most athletic competition purposes, which included schools with an enrollment of 75 to 476 students in that grade range. The football team competes in Division 1B of the Big Central Football Conference, which includes 60 public and private high schools in Hunterdon, Middlesex, Somerset, Union and Warren counties, which are broken down into 10 divisions by size and location. The school was classified by the NJSIAA as Group I South for football for 2024–2026, which included schools with 185 to 482 students. The school's mascot is the Owl. The colors of HPHS and its various sports teams are maroon and white.

HPHS is known for its long-time success in track and field and baseball, with more recent successes in boys' and girls' soccer and boys' and girls' tennis. There is also the girls' and boys' basketball teams and the cheer leading and dance teams that performs at football and basketball games. The school also has cross country, girls volleyball, wrestling and softball teams. HPHS is also home to an Ultimate team, the Enforcers, although the team is not affiliated with the school's varsity sports program.

The boys' basketball team won the Group I state championship in 1948, defeating Weehawken High School by a score of 57-53 in the tournament's championship game.

The boys' track team won the spring / outdoor track title in Group II in 1958, 1959 and 1960.

The baseball team won the Central Jersey Group II state sectional championship in 1959, 1962, 1966, 1969 and 1970.

The boys' indoor track team won the Group II championship in 1962, 1963, 1971 (co-champion with Lincoln High School), 1980 (co-champion with Roselle Park High School) and 1984. The girls team won the Group II title in 1981 and 2018.

The boys' track team won the Group I/II state indoor relay championship in 1966 (co-champion with Clearview Regional High School), and won the Group I title in 1980, 1981 and 1984.

L.J. Smith, of the Baltimore Ravens, was a star of both the HPHS football and basketball teams in the 1990s. The football team won the NJSIAA Central Jersey Group I state sectional championship in 1974 (awarded by NJSIAA), 1977, 1978, 1986, 1989 and 1990. The 1977 Highland Park football team won the Central Jersey Group I state title with a 35-12 win against Dunellen High School in the championship game.

The field hockey team won the Central Jersey Group I state sectional title in 1977.

The girls' track team won the winter track Group I state title in 1978, 1980 and 2017.

The girls' basketball team won the 2007 Central, Group I championship, topping Dunellen High School, 50–35 in the final.

In 2011, the boys' tennis team won the New Jersey Group I championship for the first time, defeating Leonia High School in the final round of the tournament. The 2019 team won the Group I state title at Mercer County Park, defeating Middle Township High School 4-1 in the semifinals and moving on to beat New Providence High School 3-2 in the finals. The team won four consecutive Central Jersey Group I titles in 2016-2019.

The cross-country running team won the Central Jersey Group II state sectional title in 1966-1968.

== Administration ==
The school's principal is Kristina Donovan, who took the position at the start of the 2024–25 school year. Her core administration team includes the assistant principal and the athletic coordinator.

William H. Donahue, who became principal of the school in 1980 and worked at the school for three decades, was murdered in 1987.

== Notable alumni ==
- Jim Axelrod (born 1963, class of 1981), White House correspondent for CBS News
- Lance Carter (1955–2006, class of 1974), jazz drummer and percussionist
- David Clewell (1955-2020), poet and creative writing instructor at Webster University who served as the Poet Laureate of Missouri
- Wheeler Winston Dixon (born 1950, class of 1968), filmmaker, critic and author
- Nancy Dorian (1936–2024, class of 1954), linguist who carried out research into the decline of the East Sutherland dialect of Scottish Gaelic
- Samuel G. Freedman (born 1955, class of 1973), journalist and author
- Willie Garson (born 1964, as Willie Paszamant; class of 1982), actor best known for his appearances on Sex and The City
- Alan Guth (born 1947), physicist who left high school after his junior year to enroll at the Massachusetts Institute of Technology
- Amy Herzog (class of 1996), playwright and finalist for the Pulitzer Prize for Drama, who was valedictorian of her graduating class
- John Hulme (born 1987), author of the book series The Seems and director of the documentary Blood, Sweat & Tears: A Basketball Exorcism.
- Soterios Johnson, (class of 1986) former local host of NPR's Morning Edition on WNYC
- Lincoln Jones (1933–2013), US Army major general
- David Kagen (born 1948, class of 1966), film, stage and television actor, best known for playing Sheriff Mike Garris in the 1986 film Friday the 13th Part VI: Jason Lives
- Ted Kubiak (born 1942, class of 1960), infielder who played for the Kansas City / Oakland A's, Milwaukee Brewers, St. Louis Cardinals, Texas Rangers and the San Diego Padres
- Jerry Levine (born 1957, class of 1975), actor and director of television and theater, best known for appearing on Will & Grace and in the films Teen Wolf and Casual Sex?
- Susan Pitt (1948–2024), competition swimmer and world record-holder in the 200-meter butterfly
- Stav Prodromou (born 1944, class of 1960), businessman who was the founder and former chief executive officer of Poqet Computer Corporation
- L. J. Smith (born 1980), tight end who has played for the Baltimore Ravens
