= Brudner =

Brudner may refer to:

- Brudner Prize, awards contributions to the field of lesbian and gay studies
- Harvey Jerome Brudner (1931–2009), Kilmer scholar
