= Nancy Dorian =

American linguist (1936–2024)

- Born: 1936; New Brunswick, New Jersey, US
- Died: April 24, 2024 (aged 88); Brunswick, Maine, US
- Known for: Work on Scottish Gaelic and language death; Language Death: The Life Cycle of a Scottish Gaelic Dialect
- Awards: Kenneth L. Hale Award

Academic background
- Education: Connecticut College (BA); University of Michigan (MA, PhD)

Academic work
- Discipline: Linguist, anthropologist
- Sub-discipline: Celtic studies; Language death
- Institutions: Bryn Mawr College; University of Pennsylvania

Nancy Currier Dorian (1936 – April 24, 2024) was an American linguist who carried out research into the decline of the East Sutherland dialect of Scottish Gaelic for over 40 years, particularly in the villages of Brora, Golspie and Embo. Due to their isolation from other Gaelic-speaking communities, these East Sutherland villages presented a good opportunity to study language death. Dorian's study is possibly the longest such study in the field. She was considered "a prime authority" on language death. Language Death: The Life Cycle of a Scottish Gaelic Dialect, her study into the decline of Gaelic in East Sutherland, is considered "the first major monograph" on this subject. According to linguist Joan Argenter, Dorian's name "is well known to scholars working in" several areas of linguistics.

== Life ==
East Sutherland Gaelic

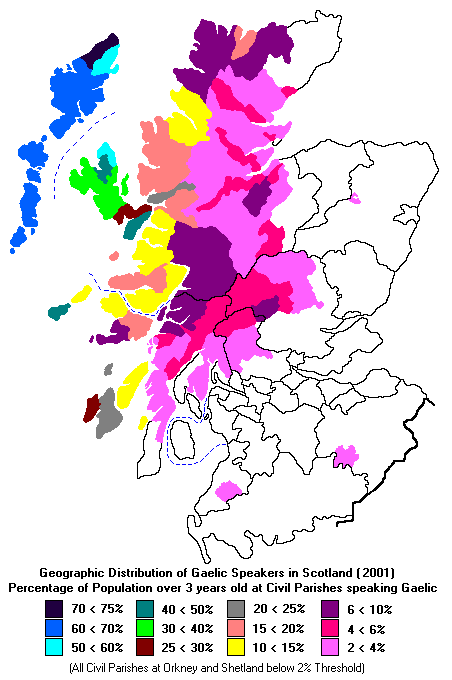
According to the 2001 census, between 2% and 4% of the population of East Sutherland spoke Gaelic.

Nancy Dorian was born in New Brunswick, New Jersey in 1936. Raised in nearby Highland Park, she graduated from Highland Park High School in 1954. She studied German at the Connecticut College for Women and graduated summa cum laude in 1958. She received an MA (1961) and PhD (1965) from the University of Michigan and taught linguistics and German at Bryn Mawr College from 1965 to 1989, and also taught at the University of Pennsylvania and the University of Kiel. Dorian was a professor emeritus at Bryn Mawr. She was a Unitarian Universalist; her hymn Dear Weaver of our Lives' Design won a prize for celebrating feminine imagery of the divine. She died suddenly on April 24, 2024, in Brunswick, Maine.

Dorian first noticed the Gaelic language while conducting fieldwork for the Linguistic Survey of Scotland in 1963. Noting that a declining localized speech form offered a chance to find out what sorts of changes took place as a speech form passed out of use, she began a long-term study of variation and change in East Sutherland Gaelic. When Dorian started studying the dialect, there were still more than 200 speakers in Brora, Golspie and Embo, including 105 in Embo, where they were more than a third of the population. Although traditional practice calls for anthropologists to change fieldwork settings, health challenges led Dorian to continue study of East Sutherland language development, a situation that had the beneficial side effect of producing a study of unprecedented scope and continuity. Previous researchers had focused on the NORM (non-mobile old rural male) speakers, who had more conservative language, at the expense of the wider speech community.

She coined the term "semi-speaker" for those, mostly from the younger generations, who could speak Gaelic but imperfectly. Her attention to the way that speech competence develops differently in endangered and obsolete languages led socio-linguists to take an interest in understanding different speaker types and their relations to the process of language shift and language shift reversal. Dorian criticized researchers who focused narrowly on single speakers, which conveniently ignored the variation between speakers.

Her book The Tyranny of Tide: An Oral History of the East Sutherland Fisherfolk blurred the lines between linguistics and ethnology, revealing how these fields help illuminate and complement each other.

== Notable works ==
=== Language Death: The Life Cycle of a Scottish Gaelic Dialect (1981) ===
Dorian published sixteen years of research on East Sutherland Gaelic as Language Death: The Life Cycle of a Scottish Gaelic Dialect. According to a review by Wolfgang U. Dressler, it was "the first major monograph" on language death. In the view of Professor Tracy Harris and Suzanne Romaine, it was the most comprehensive work on the subject that had been published; Harris also stated that it was "a great contribution to the field of linguistics". Dressler wrote that "[i]t would take too long to describe all the praiseworthy aspects of this book", and that it was "indispensable" to scholars of language death. Romaine highlighted the multidisciplinary perspective with which Dorian had approached her work, producing a book that would appeal to ethnographers, sociologists, Celtic scholars, historians of Scotland, and a wide range of linguists, including those specializing in sociolinguistics, historical linguistics, and syntax.

Dorian identified some counterintuitive ways in which language shift was functioning in East Sutherland, noting that the Gaelic language was able to adapt to modern life even while becoming moribund. No diglossia developed, because speakers were able to borrow words from English and apply them to any discussion, even for highly technical topics. She was able to classify speakers as "older fluent speakers", "younger fluent speakers", and "semi-speakers", describing the linguistic differences between each speaker type. Her finding that the socioeconomically homogeonous community was characterized by a high degree of variation between speakers was later elaborated in her 2010 book Investigating Variation: The Effects of Social Organization and Social Setting. Certain types of syntactic distinctions, such as grammatical gender, case markings, and the two passive constructions, were lost gradually, rather than erased wholesale, as some theoreticians had predicted. Dorian did not find the same types of linguistic changes which were thought to mark endangered languages.

She postulated that the type of change in endangered languages was the same as in healthy languages, but the rate of change was greatly accelerated; the defining features of an endangered language were sociolinguistic rather than structural. Her research showed that the exclusion of Gaelic from the school curriculum was a major factor in its decline, because it reduced the number of opportunities to use Gaelic and cemented its lower status and "usefulness" in the eyes of the community. Another important factor, Dorian found, was the presence of prosperous English-speaking incomers which caused the poorer Gaelic speakers to connect the English language with economic success. Later research showed that the features that Dorian identified for Sutherland Gaelic's decline also applied to many other obsolescent languages.

=== Investigating Obsolescence: Studies in Language Contraction and Death (1989) ===
Dorian was inspired to organize this collection of essays when she realized that there were no conferences or journals dedicated to the study of language death, where scholars in the field could share ideas. The book was described by Dorian as a "stepping stone" to future research into language death. By examining 37 languages and dialects, the authors of essays contributed to the availability of information on specific minority languages. At the same time, the different methodologies used help other researchers learn more about endangered language research. The essays elucidated how second-language learner methodologies could be applied to the study of heritage speakers of endangered languages for whom the language is not their primary mode of communication, one of Dorian's main goals for the collection. In addition, the book was described by Carl Blyth as a "milestone" because it "establishes a more coherent agenda in a disparate and still emerging field". Investigating Obsolescence "undoubtedly compares to other major collections of sociolinguistic essays", according to Emanuel Drechsel.

=== Small-Language Fates and Prospects: Lessons of persistence and Change from Endangered Languages (2014) ===
Within this book, Dorian's primary focus of study is the fishing towns of Brora, Golspie, and Embo, located in eastern Sutherland, and the transformation of Gaelic dialect in these towns. Dorian notes that on her arrival, many people were bilingual in Gaelic and English—this led to further documentation in linguistic changes such as speech patterns and overall reductions in skill and proficiency. Dorian analyzes language ideology and the importance of its contribution in language shift. She argues that it is important to analyze the speakers' range and ability to utilize the Gaelic language. Dorian concludes this book with notes on field work and the methodologies of working within the community when positioned as an outsider, and utilizes her decades of work to provide an in-depth view of Gaelic language transformation.

According to a review by linguist Lenore A. Grenoble, the most striking thing about the book is that it has relevance in its field today considering the book spans decades of work. Also, anthropologist Emily McEwan-Fujita's review comments on its value as a resource for students and scholars. Grenoble also highlights the usefulness of publishing a book of these collections that allows for easier access where tracking down older articles may be difficult.

== Legacy ==
Carl Blyth wrote in 1994 that Dorian "deserves foremost credit for consistently drawing the attention of linguists and anthropologists to the importance of endangered languages". In 2005, Dorian was the subject of a documentary that aired on BBC Alba: "Mar a Chunnaic Mise: Nancy Dorian agus a' Ghàidhlig" ("As I saw it: Nancy Dorian and Gaelic"). The documentary focused on her work on East Sutherland Gaelic.

In 2012 Dorian was awarded the Kenneth L. Hale Award by the Linguistic Society of America, an award which recognizes scholars for work on endangered or extinct languages. Dorian's award credited her for "research on Scots Gaelic that spans a period of almost fifty years—perhaps the most sustained record of research on any endangered language; and for her effective advocacy for the cause of endangered language preservation and revitalization. Hers was one of the earliest and one of the most prominent voices raised in support of endangered languages." Dorian received an honorary degree from Glasgow University in 2015.

== List of works ==
- Dorian, Nancy C. (1978). East Sutherland Gaelic: the dialect of the Brora, Golspie, and Embo fishing communities. Dublin Institute for Advanced Studies. ISBN 9781855000995.
- Dorian, Nancy C. (1981). Language Death: The Life Cycle of a Scottish Gaelic Dialect. University of Pennsylvania Press. ISBN 9780812277852.
- Dorian, Nancy C. (1985). The tyranny of tide: An Oral History of the East Sutherland Fisherfolk. Karoma. ISBN 9780897200622.
- Dorian, Nancy, ed. (1992) [1989]. Investigating Obsolescence: Studies in Language Contraction and Death. Cambridge University Press. ISBN 9780521437578.
- Dorian, Nancy C. (2010). Investigating Variation: The Effects of Social Organization and Social Setting. Oxford University Press. ISBN 9780199738250.
- Dorian, Nancy (2014). Small-Language Fates and Prospects: Lessons of Persistence and Change from Endangered Languages: Collected Essays. Brill. ISBN 9789004261938.
