= Speaker types =

Classification of fluency mainly for endangered languages

Within the linguistic study of endangered languages, sociolinguists distinguish between different speaker types based on the type of competence they have acquired of the endangered language. Often when a community is gradually shifting away from an endangered language to a majority language, not all speakers acquire full linguistic competence; instead, speakers have varying degrees and types of competence depending on their exposure to the minority language in their upbringing. The relevance of speaker types in cases of language shift was first noted by Nancy Dorian, who coined the term semi-speaker to refer to those speakers of Sutherland Gaelic who were predominantly English-speaking and whose Gaelic competence was limited and showed considerable influence from English. Later studies added additional speaker types such as rememberers (who remember some words and phrases but have little or no grammatical competence and do not actively speak the language), and passive speakers (who have nearly full comprehension competence but do not actively speak the language). In the context of language revitalization, new speakers who have learned the endangered language as a second language are sometimes distinguished.

In contexts of language acquisition and language teaching studies, there is sometimes a distinction between native speakers and second language speakers, depending on whether the language was learned as a language of primary socialisation or after having fully acquired a first language. In contexts of multilingualism a bilingual speaker may also be described as a heritage speaker (although a heritage language actually refers to a language whose speakers have moved from the original area where the language was spoken: e.g. Welsh is a heritage language in Patagonia, but not in Wales) if they have not been as fully exposed to one of their languages, leading to a diminished degree of confidence in themselves as speakers, and sometimes also limited competence in one of their languages.

== Rememberers ==
A rememberer knows individual words or phrases (sometimes entire texts) but cannot use the target language productively. Such persons are of particular interest when studying any endangered or dying language. Rememberers are contrasted with fluent or full speakers, who have a good command of the language, and semi-speakers, who have a partial command of it. The distinction between fluent speakers and rememberers is important in fieldwork, but accurately determining where a member of a language community falls on the speaker-rememberer continuum can be challenging.

== Passive speakers ==
A passive speaker (also referred to as a receptive bilingual or passive bilingual) has had enough exposure to a language in childhood to have a native-like comprehension of it but has little or no active command of it. Such speakers are especially common in language shift communities in which speakers of a declining language do not acquire active competence. For example, around 10% of the Ainu people who speak the language are considered passive speakers.

Passive speakers are often targeted in language revival efforts to increase the number of speakers of a language quickly, as they are likely to gain active and near-native speaking skills more quickly than those with no knowledge of the language. They are also found in areas where people grow up hearing another language outside their family with no formal education.

== Fluent speakers ==
A fluent speaker is someone who has a good command of the language.

== Semi-speakers ==
A semi-speaker is a speaker who has acquired at least a basic linguistic competence in a given language but does not generally use it regularly in conversation. Their speech can contain erroneous forms. Semi-speakers are often among the most motivated and engaged participants in language revitalization projects. As languages become obsolete and speech communities shift to other languages, the earlier language is spoken less frequently and in fewer social domains. Many speakers learn the language partially, often with simplification and significant influence from the majority language. They are sometimes referred to as "semi-speakers", "quasi-speakers" or "rememberers".

The word "semi-speaker" was introduced by linguist Nancy Dorian in describing the last speakers of the East Sutherland dialect of Scottish Gaelic.

When semi-speakers form a significant part of the speech community, language contraction often ensues, as the linguistic norms are accommodated to speakers' competence.

== Terminal speakers ==
A terminal speaker is the final native speaker of a language; when the terminal speaker dies, they end the final step of the language death process, and the language becomes a "dead" or "extinct" language. In the process of language death, the remaining speakers begin to lose some of the vocabulary and grammar of the language. When only a terminal speaker remains, that person will not remember a complete form of the language as it had been spoken by a larger community which used it in all domains.

Terminal speakers are usually bilingual by the time of their death, remembering their heritage language but interacting with their community in another language. The importance of that distinction is seen in the story of Dolly Pentreath of Cornwall. She is popularly named as the last fluent, first-language speaker of Cornish, although there were others who still spoke it for many years, though possibly incompletely. Terminal speakers are sometimes found by linguists documenting a language before it dies. A clear example of a terminal speaker being contacted by a linguist is the case of Abegaz, the last speaker of the Mesmes language in Ethiopia. He lived in an isolated, hilly area, and was about 80 years old when he was contacted by a team of sociolinguistic language surveyors; he has since died. Tevfik Esenç was the last speaker of the Ubykh language, and his collaboration with linguists helped document the language before his death in 1992. Ned Maddrell was the last speaker of the Manx language before its revival, dying in 1974. In 2008, Doris McLemore was reported to be the terminal speaker of the Wichita language as she worked with a team of linguists to document the language before it died completely.

== See also ==
- Transitional bilingualism
