= Greater Brunswick Charter School =

Coordinates: 40.47884°N 74.46284°W

- 429 Joyce Kilmer Avenue, New Brunswick, NJ 08901

Information
- Type: Public elementary school/middle school
- Established: 1998
- Faculty: 33.0 FTEs
- Grades: K - 8
- Enrollment: 395 (as of 2017–18)
- Student to teacher ratio: 12.0:1
- Website: School website

Greater Brunswick Charter School (GBCS) is a public charter school serving grades kindergarten through eighth located on 429 Joyce Kilmer Avenue in New Brunswick, New Jersey. The school has a Spanish-English bilingual program for grades K-4, and has plans to extend it through grade five.

== History ==
The school opened in the 1998–99 school year. In 2004, it purchased its current building, formerly a bowling alley, with the help of a $500,000 government grant and a $2.5 million loan from New Jersey Community Capital and the Community Redevelopment Fund.

Over the summer of 2010, the charter school expanded, creating over a dozen classrooms and a larger gymnasium out of warehouse space in the building. The funding for this was secured by the nonprofit organization Build With Purpose (then known as READS). A year prior to this expansion, the school's middle school and one fifth grade classroom had been housed across the street from the school building. The following year, a playground was added, with assistance from KaBOOM!.

== Student body ==
As of the 2017–18 school year, the school had an enrollment of 395 students and 33.0 classroom teachers (on an FTE basis), for a student–teacher ratio of 12.0:1. 70.4% were Hispanic, 19.4% were black, 8.1% were white, and 1.8% were Asian. 63.4% of the students were eligible for a free or reduced-price lunch. 55.2% of students primarily spoke Spanish and 44.8% primarily spoke English at home. The school has a student:teacher ratio of 15:1. GBCS will accept students from any district in New Jersey, although it gives preference to those from Edison, New Brunswick, and Highland Park.

== Administration ==
Core members of the school administration include Vanessa Jones, the education director; and Hector Alvarez, the assistant education director.
