= Into the Bright Sunshine =

Into the Bright Sunshine: Young Hubert Humphrey and the Fight for Civil Rights
- Author: Samuel G. Freedman
- Language: English
- Genre: Non-fiction
- Published: 2023
- Publisher: Oxford University Press
- Publication place: United States

Into the Bright Sunshine: Young Hubert Humphrey and the Fight for Civil Rights is a 2023 non-fiction book written by Samuel G. Freedman.

== Synopsis ==
The story of a young Hubert Humphrey and his fight for Civil Rights.
