= Soterios Johnson =

American radio journalist

Soterios Johnson is an American radio journalist and the former local host of National Public Radio's Morning Edition on New York City public-radio station WNYC.

== Early life and education ==
Johnson was named after his Greek maternal grandfather. His surname comes from his paternal grandfather, Ioannou, who moved to New York from Cyprus. A native of Highland Park, New Jersey, Johnson was introduced to radio by his father, who was a recording engineer at WNEW.

Johnson graduated from Highland Park High School, where he participated in the school's radio station. While attending Columbia University in New York City, he worked at a small FM station in his hometown and at the college's WKCR-FM (89.9 FM) radio station. In 1990, he graduated with a degree in American history from Columbia University's Columbia College. He then earned a master's degree from the Columbia University Graduate School of Journalism.

== Career ==
Johnson began working for WNYC in an overnight position, and also covered weekends and holidays. He became the permanent host of Morning Edition on WNYC in summer 2003.

In the summer of 2016, Johnson left WNYC to join the University of California, Davis as Director of Humanities, Arts, and Cultural Programs.

== Personal life ==
As of November 2016, Johnson lives in California with his husband.

== Influence on music ==
His name inspired the name of New York City three-piece band Satirius Johnson.

Jonathan Coulton, a folk-rock artist based in New York, wrote a song called "Dance, Soterios Johnson, Dance", which presents a fictionalized secret life of Johnson as a club-goer.

== Awards ==
- 2006 New York Press Club award
