= Transitional bilingualism =

Transitional bilingualism is the shift from being bilingual, knowing two different languages, to only speaking one leading language. This usually happens over a period of time and can be seen within a few generations. There are families with immigrant grandparents who speak primarily their native language and some of the new country's language. Their children then speak both languages, but the grandchildren only speak the dominant or preferred language of the new location. The United States provides many examples of this phenomenon. For example, a woman born and raised in Mexico moved to the United States and learned a bit of English and spoke a great deal of Spanish as well. Her daughter, born and reared in the U.S. was equally fluent in both Spanish and English (bilingual). The grandchild of the Mexican immigrant, who was born and has been reared in the U.S., speaks only English.

This process is due to the pressure that is put on the individuals by the society of the new environment. They cannot survive well without the primary language spoken in their new home and eventually, since fewer and fewer people speak the "old" native language, it is not used as often, as it is not a necessity, and is lost.

== See also ==
- Semi-speaker
- Heritage language
- Passive bilingual
- Language shift
