= Samuel G. Freedman =

American author and journalist

- Born: October 3, 1955 (age 71); Manhattan, New York City, New York, U.S.
- Education: University of Wisconsin–Madison
- Occupations: Author, journalist, professor
- Notable work: Into the Bright Sunshine
- Awards: National Jewish Book Award (2000)

Samuel G. Freedman (born October 3, 1955) is an American author, journalist, and professor emeritus at the Columbia University Graduate School of Journalism.

== Biography ==
Born in 1955 at Lenox Hill Hospital in New York City's Lenox Hill neighborhood, Freedman was raised in Highland Park, New Jersey, along with his younger brother and sister. His father, David Freedman, co-founded the life science company New Brunswick Scientific (now a subsidiary of Eppendorf). His mother, Eleanor (née Hatkin), was the subject of his book, Who She Was.

A paperboy in his youth, Freedman went on to attend the University of Wisconsin–Madison after graduating from Highland Park High School in 1973. After receiving his bachelor's degree in journalism and history in 1977, Freedman went on to work at the Courier News in New Jersey, and later the Suburban Trib, a now-defunct subsidiary of the Chicago Tribune. Before publishing his first book in 1990 and gaining his professorship at Columbia University, Freedman was a staff reporter for the culture section of The New York Times.

Freedman has authored multiple nonfiction books, including Who She Was: A Son's Search for His Mother's Life, a book about his mother's early life, and Letters to a Young Journalist. He won a National Jewish Book Award in 2000 in the non-fiction category for Jew vs. Jew: The Struggle for the Soul of American Jewry. His book The Inheritance: How Three Families Moved from Roosevelt to Reagan and Beyond was a finalist for the 1997 Pulitzer Prize for General Nonfiction. His book Breaking the Line: The Season in Black College Football That Transformed the Sport and Changed the Course of Civil Rights was published in 2013. His book about Hubert Humphrey, Into the Bright Sunshine, was published in 2023.

Freedman formerly wrote the "On Religion" column in The New York Times and the "In the Diaspora" column in The Jerusalem Post.

Freedman served as a judge for the 2019 and 2020 American Mosaic Journalism Prize.

In the spring of 2025, Freedman taught his final semester at Columbia, after 35 years as a professor.

== Works ==
- Small Victories: The Real World of a Teacher, Her Students, and Their High School, New York: Harper and Row (1990)
- Upon This Rock: The Miracles of a Black Church, New York: HarperCollins (1993)
- The Inheritance: How Three Families Moved from Roosevelt to Reagan and Beyond, New York: Simon & Schuster (1996)
- Jew vs. Jew: The Struggle for the Soul of American Jewry, New York: Simon & Schuster (2000)
- Who She Was: A Son's Search for His Mother's Life, New York: Simon & Schuster (2005)
- Letters to a Young Journalist, New York: Basic Books (2006, revised in 2011)
- Breaking the Line: The Season in Black College Football That Transformed the Sport and Changed the Course of Civil Rights, New York: Simon & Schuster (2013)
- Into the Bright Sunshine: Young Hubert Humphrey and the Fight for Civil Rights, Oxford University Press (2023)

== Views ==
Freedman has described white identity as "a source of power and privilege", that has been utilized historically in the United States in "opposition to black progress" (commonly called white backlash). He has also suggested that Donald Trump's administration has used the conservative movement and the Republican Party as a vehicle for white identity, nationalism, and power.
