= Meryl Frank =

American politician and diplomat

Member of the United States Holocaust Memorial Council
- Designate
- Assumed office TBA
- Appointed by: Joe Biden

Mayor of Highland Park, New Jersey
- In office 2000–2010
- Preceded by: H. James Polos
- Succeeded by: Steve Nolan

Personal details
- Party: Democratic
- Education: Rutgers University (BA); Yale University (MA, MA, MPH)

Meryl L. Frank is an American politician, non-profit executive, diplomat, and author.

== Education ==
Frank earned a Bachelor of Arts degree in history from Rutgers University, followed by a Master of Arts in political science, Master of Arts in international relations, and Master of Public Health from Yale University.

== Career ==
Frank helped author legislation for President Bill Clinton, including the Family and Medical Leave Act of 1993, and New Jersey Governor Thomas Kean. She was the mayor of Highland Park, New Jersey from 2000 to 2010.

In 2009, President Barack Obama appointed Frank to represent the United States at the Fifth World Conference on Women. In 2010, Obama appointed her ambassador to the United Nations Commission on the Status of Women.

In 2015, Variety reported that Frank had been named the executive director of FilmAid. In January 2022, Frank was appointed to serve as a member of the United States Holocaust Memorial Council.

In 2023, Hachette Books published Frank's memoir of searching for the history of her family lost in the Holocaust, Unearthed: A Lost Actress, a Forbidden Book, and a Search for Life in the Shadow of the Holocaust. She is Jewish.
