= Lincoln Jones =

US Army major general (1933–2013)

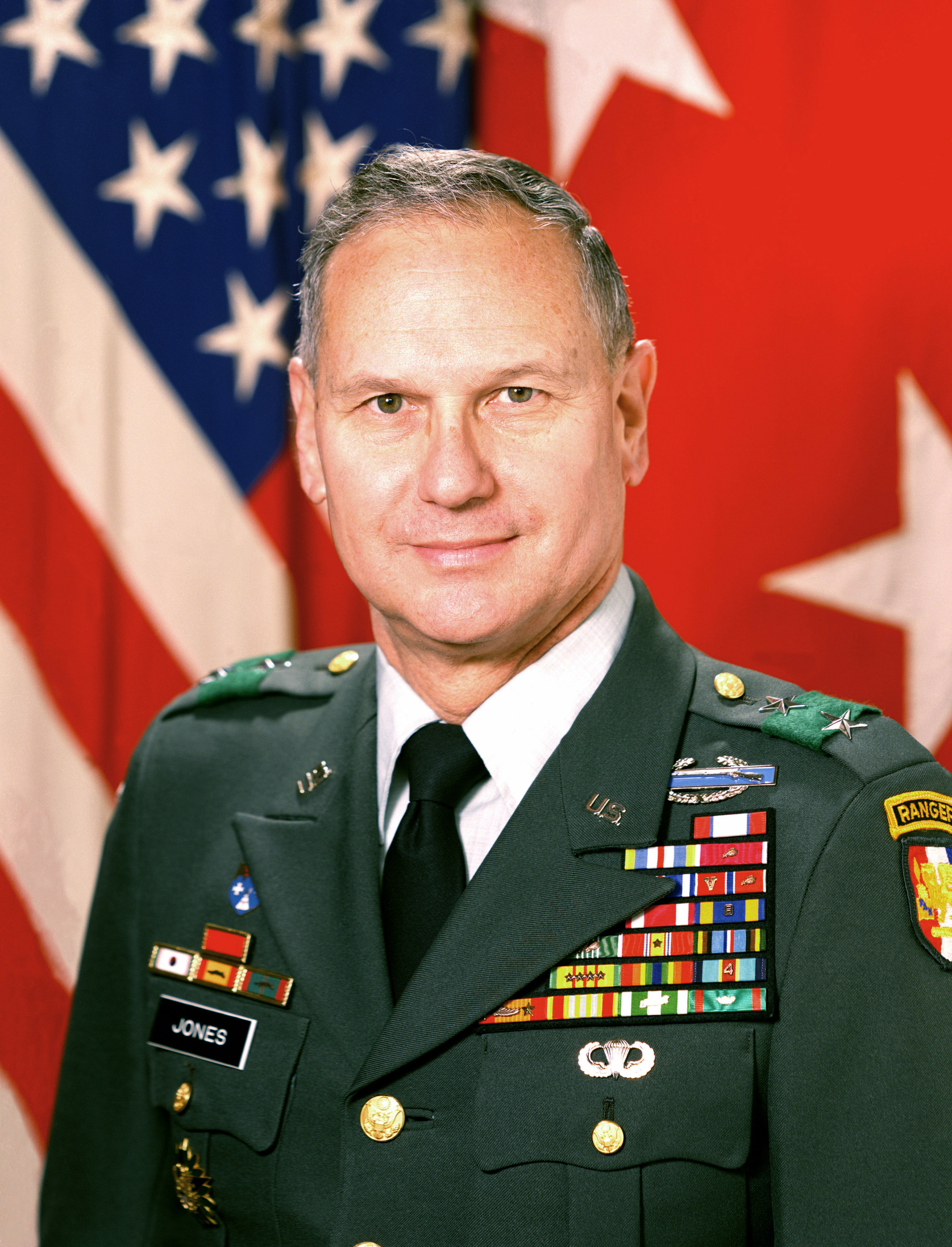
- Jones as a major general in January 1990
- Born: 23 January 1933; Fort Benning, Georgia, US
- Died: 16 January 2013 (aged 79); The Woodlands, Texas, US
- Burial place: West Point Cemetery
- Alma mater: United States Military Academy; Auburn University; Air Command and Staff College; National War College
- Spouse: Alexandra Ann Archbald (m. 1958–2013)
- Children: 2
- Military career
- Service: United States Army
- Service years: 1958–1990
- Rank: Major General
- Nickname: Linc
- Unit: US Army Infantry Branch
- Commands: 1st Battalion, 12th Infantry Regiment; 2nd Brigade, 9th Infantry Division; V Corps; Southern European Task Force; 5th Theater Army Area Command
- Wars: Vietnam War
- Awards: Army Distinguished Service Medal (2); Defense Superior Service Medal; Legion of Merit (2); Distinguished Flying Cross; Bronze Star Medal (2); Complete List
- Other work: Strategic planning consultant Business executive

Lincoln Jones (23 January 1933 – 16 January 2013) was a career officer in the United States Army. A 1958 graduate of the United States Military Academy at West Point, he served until retiring in 1990 and attained the rank of major general. Jones was a veteran of the Vietnam War and his decorations included two awards of the Army Distinguished Service Medal, the Defense Superior Service Medal, two awards of the Legion of Merit, and the Distinguished Flying Cross.

A native of Fort Benning, Georgia and the son of an army officer, Jones was raised and educated in New Jersey and attended Highland Park High School and the Dwight School. After attending Lehigh University, in 1953 he obtained an appointment to the United States Military Academy at West Point. He attended from 1954 to 1958, then began a career as an Infantry officer. Jones attended the Infantry Officer Basic Course, Infantry Officer Advanced Course, United States Army Airborne School, and Ranger School, and carried out duty assignments in the Continental United States, Hawaii, South Korea, and Italy. During the Vietnam War, he served with the 4th Infantry Division as deputy assistant chief of staff for personnel (assistant G-1) and battalion operations officer (S-3) and executive officer. His post-war postings included aide-de-camp to the Vice Chief of Staff of the United States Army and the vice-chief's executive officer.

Jones later served as executive officer of the 4th Infantry Division's 2nd Brigade, commander of 1st Battalion, 12th Infantry Regiment, and deputy division chief of staff. His later postings included command of the 9th Infantry Division's 2nd Brigade, division chief of staff, and assistant division commander for operations. His final posting before retiring in 1990 was in Italy as commander of the Southern European Task Force and 5th Theater Army Area Command.

After his military retirement, Jones lived near Houston and pursued a career as a corporate executive and strategic consultant. In addition, he was a board member or board chairman of several civic and professional organizations. Jones died in The Woodlands, Texas on 16 January 2013. He was buried at West Point Cemetery.

== Early life ==
Lincoln Jones III was born at Fort Benning, Georgia on 23 January 1933, the son of Lincoln Jones Jr. and Doris (Baltz) Jones. Lincoln Jones Jr. was a 1926 graduate of the United States Military Academy (West Point) who was retired for disability as a captain in 1937. After his 1948 death, Doris Jones married Lloyd W. Salisbury, whose son Alan Blanchard Salisbury graduated from West Point in 1958 and retired from the army as a major general in 1987.

The younger Lincoln Jones was raised and educated in Maplewood and Highland Park, New Jersey and attended Highland Park High School. In 1950, he began attendance at the Dwight School, after which he attended Lehigh University. In 1953, he received an appointment to West Point from US Representative Robert Kean. He attended from 1954 to 1958 and at graduation received his commission as a second lieutenant of Infantry.

=== Family ===
In June 1958, Jones married Alexandra Ann Archbald of Highland Park, New Jersey. They were married until his death and were the parents of two children. Peter Lincoln Jones attained the rank of brigadier general in the US army; after retirement, he served as president of the National Infantry Museum Foundation. Patricia Ann Jones married Malcolm B. Frost; the Frosts were career army officers who each attained the rank of major general.

== Start of career ==
Jones' military education included the Infantry Officer Basic Course, Infantry Officer Advanced Course, United States Army Airborne School, and Ranger School. In 1969, Jones graduated from the Air Command and Staff College and received a Master of Political Science degree from Auburn University; his Staff College class was the first to be jointly enrolled in Auburn University's Air University division. Jones went on to complete the course at the National War College.

At the start of his career, Jones served in lieutenant's and captain's assignments in the continental United States, Hawaii, South Korea, and Italy. During the Vietnam War, he served successively as deputy assistant chief of staff for personnel (assistant G-1) of the 4th Infantry Division (4th ID), followed by postings as operations officer (S-3) and executive officer of the 25th Infantry Division's 2nd Battalion, 35th Infantry Regiment. Upon return to the United States, his assignments included aide-de-camp to the Vice Chief of Staff of the United States Army and the vice-chief's executive officer.

== Continued career ==
Jones' subsequent assignments included a return to the 4th ID, where he served as executive officer of the division's 2nd Brigade, commander of 1st Battalion, 12th Infantry Regiment, and deputy chief of staff. He went on to serve as deputy commander of the 193rd Infantry Brigade at Fort Kobbe, Panama Canal Zone. While serving with the 9th Infantry Division at Fort Lewis, Washington, Jones commanded the division's 2nd Brigade, served as division chief of staff, and was assigned as assistant division commander for operations.

Positions in which Jones later served included deputy commander and acting commander of V Corps in West Germany, and deputy chief of staff for support at Allied Land Forces Southern Europe in Italy. His final posting was commander of the Southern European Task Force and 5th Theater Army Area Command in Italy. Jones retired as a major general in 1990.

== Later career ==
After leaving the army, Jones pursued a civilian business career in the energy industry. He served as president of the Enron Power Corporation from 1993 to 1998 and vice chairman of Enron Europe from 1996 to 1998. In addition, he was appointed managing director of the Integrated Business and Energy Development Corporation of Pakistan and chairman of Worldwide Strategic Partners. Jones also owned and operated the Lincoln Associates international consulting firm. His civic and professional memberships included board member and board chairman of the National Defense University Foundation, board chairman for the World Affairs Council of Houston, and president of the West Point Society of Houston. Jones died in The Woodlands, Texas on 16 January 2013. He was buried at West Point Cemetery.

== Awards ==
Jones' awards and decorations included:

- Army Distinguished Service Medal with oak leaf cluster
- Defense Superior Service Medal
- Legion of Merit with oak leaf cluster
- Distinguished Flying Cross
- Bronze Star Medal with oak leaf cluster and "V" device for Valor
- Meritorious Service Medal
- Air Medal (multiple awards)
- Army Commendation Medal (multiple awards)
- National Defense Service Medal with bronze service star
- Armed Forces Expeditionary Medal
- Vietnam Service Medal with four bronze service stars
- Army Service Ribbon
- Army Overseas Service Ribbon with numeral 4
- Republic of Vietnam Gallantry Cross with palm
- Armed Forces Honor Medal (First Class)
- Vietnam Campaign Medal with 1960 device
- Republic of Vietnam Civil Actions Medal (First Class)
- Combat Infantryman Badge
- Parachutist Badge
- Ranger Tab
- Army Staff Identification Badge
