= Ulrich P. Strauss =

American chemist

- Born: Ulrich Paul Strauss; January 10, 1920; Frankfurt, Germany
- Died: August 7, 2015 (aged 95); Highland Park, New Jersey
- Education: Columbia University; Cornell University
- Awards: Guggenheim Fellowship (1971)
- Scientific career
- Fields: Chemistry
- Workplaces: Rutgers University

Ulrich Paul Strauss (January 10, 1920 – August 7, 2015) was an American chemist. He was professor emeritus at Rutgers University. Strauss received a Guggenheim Fellowship in 1971.

== Biography ==
Strauss was born in Frankfurt. He earned a B.A. from Columbia University and a Ph.D. from Cornell University. He finished his postdoc at Yale University before embarking a teaching a career at Rutgers University, where he taught from 1948 to 1990. Strauss' specialty was polyelectrolytes and he created prefabricated soap micelles known as "polysoaps."

Strauss died on August 7, 2015, at age 95 at his home in Highland Park, New Jersey.
