= Harvey Jerome Brudner =

American engineer

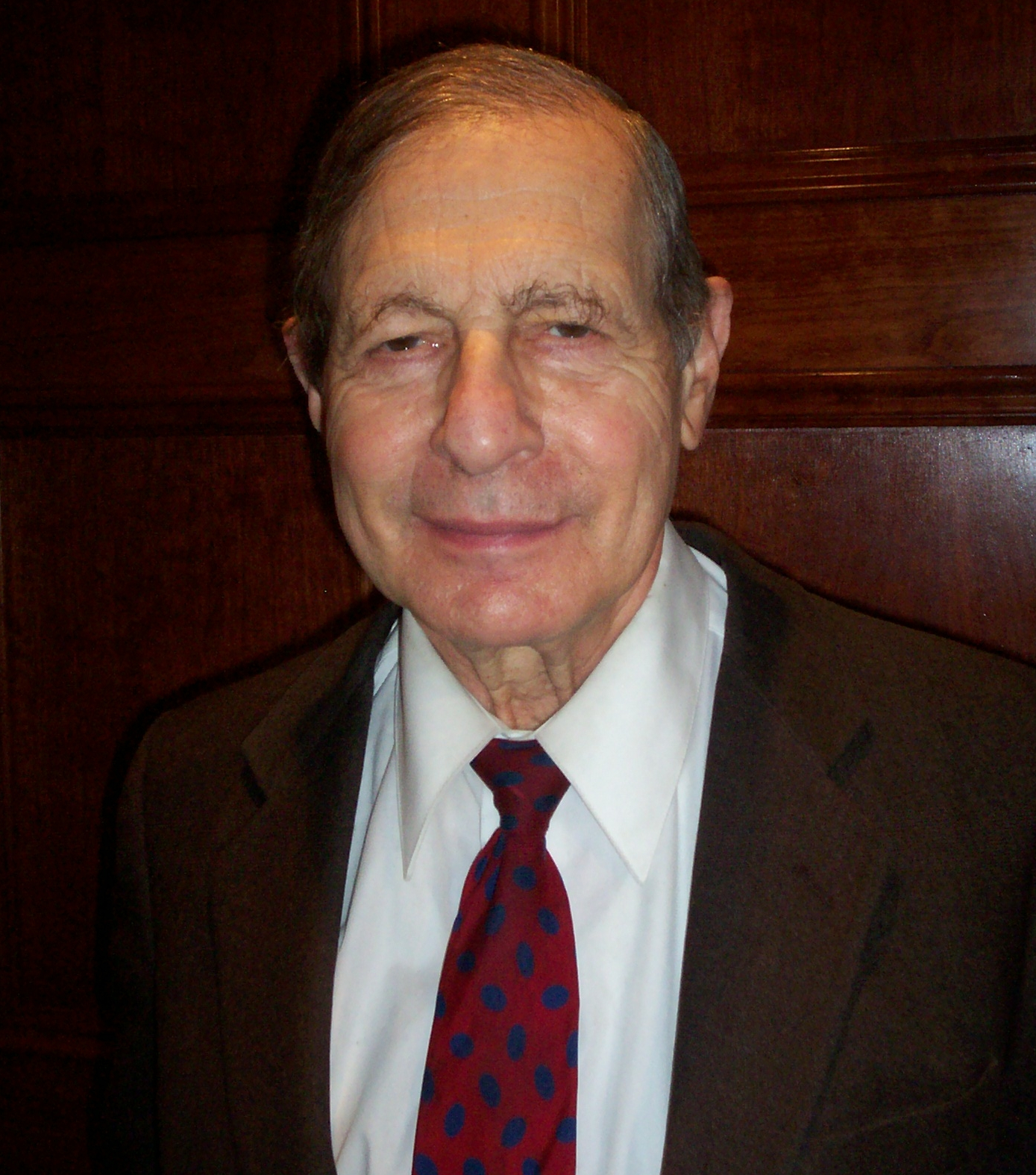
- Brudner in 2007

Vice President of Research and Development Westinghouse Learning
- In office 1967–1971

Dean of Science and Technology New York Institute of Technology
- In office 1962–1964

Personal details
- Born: May 29, 1931 Brooklyn, New York City
- Died: September 15, 2009 (aged 78) Robert Wood Johnson University Hospital; New Brunswick, New Jersey
- Spouse: Helen Gross (m. 1964–2009)
- Education: New York University (PhD)
- Occupation: Engineer
- Known for: Information theory
- Website: Brudner blog

Harvey Jerome Brudner (May 29, 1931 – September 15, 2009) was a theoretical physicist and engineer. He was the dean of science and technology of the New York Institute of Technology from 1962 to 1964. He was president of the Joyce Kilmer Centennial Commission, and the Highland Park, New Jersey Centennial Commission. He was an early proponent of using computers in the classroom. For many years he wrote on Babylonian mathematics.

== Biography ==
Brudner was born in Brooklyn, New York City on May 29, 1931, to Anna Fidelman (1901-1963) and Joseph Brudner (1898-1968?), and he had a brother, Sol B. Brudner. Joseph had emigrated from Austria in June 1908, and Anna and Joseph married on January 23, 1927, in Manhattan. Harvey received his B.S. in Engineering Physics in 1952 and graduated cum laude from New York University. Two years later, in 1954, he received his M.S. in physics, and then his Ph.D. in theoretical physics in 1959, both from New York University.

He was president of Medical Development, Inc. originally in Jersey City, New Jersey and later in Fort Lee, New Jersey in 1962. In 1962 he hired one of people sent to New York City in a reverse freedom ride. Brudner then was professor, and later the Dean of Science and Technology at the New York Institute of Technology from 1962 to 1964. He moved to the American Can Company in 1964 and stayed till 1967. He became vice president of research and development at Westinghouse Learning Corporation, a computer service and training consulting firm owned by Westinghouse Electric, from 1967 to 1971. From 1971 to 1976 he was President of Westinghouse Learning Corporation. He was made a fellow of the IEEE in 1978, "for leadership in the development and application of computers and electronic, audio-visual systems in education and training."

He later was the President of the Joyce Kilmer Centennial Commission, in New Brunswick, New Jersey from 1985 to the present. He was also President of the Highland Park, New Jersey Centennial Commission.

He died on September 15, 2009, at Robert Wood Johnson University Hospital in New Brunswick, New Jersey.

== Patents ==
- U.S. patent 3,139,753 Digital Meter (1962)
- U.S. patent 3,408,749 Branching-Instruction Teaching Device (1968)
- U.S. patent 3,504,446 Comparator Switch Set (1970)
- U.S. patent 3,504,447 Student Keyboard (1970)
- U.S. patent 3,654,708 Computer-Assisted Instruction Via Video Telephone (1972)

== Publications ==
- Brudner, Harvey (1960). "The 7s excited state of the cesium atom".
- Brudner, Harvey; Borowitz, Sidney (1960). "Thomas-Fermi Technique for Determining Wave Functions for Alkali Atoms with Excited Valence Electrons". Physical Review. 120 (6): 2053–2063. Bibcode:1960PhRv..120.2053B. doi:10.1103/PhysRev.120.2053.
- Brudner, H. J. (November 29, 1968). "Computer-Managed Instruction". Science. 162 (3857): 970–976. Bibcode:1968Sci...162..970B. doi:10.1126/science.162.3857.970. PMID 5698849.
- Algebra and Trigonometry: A Programmed Course with Applications. New York Institute of Technology and McGraw-Hill. 1971. ISBN 978-0-07-046381-3.
- "The Past, Present And Future Of Technology In Higher Education". THE Journal: Technological Horizons in Education. 1977.
- Elesvier Seqouia, S.A., Lausanne, Switzerland. "The Symmetry of Powered Whole Numbers." Vol. 4, No. 3, 1981
- Harvey J. Brudner. (1994). Fermat and the Missing Numbers. Highland Park, N.J.: WLC, Inc. ISBN 978-0-9644785-0-3.
- "How the Babylonians Solved Numbered Triangle Problems 3,600 Years Ago". Technological Horizons In Education. 1998. Archived from the original on 2011-06-29 – via Questia.
- Home News Tribune; May 29, 2006; Poet Honored War Dead Before Own Death in World War I.
- Home News Tribune; July 30, 2006; Joyce Kilmer Legacy: A Famous Poem and a Question Never to be Answered.
- The Daily Targum; February 5, 2007; Two Even Numbers Can Produce Pythagorean Triples.
- The Daily Targum; September 4, 2007; The Babylonian Approach is Easier.
- The Daily Targum; November 28, 2007; Why 4,961 6,480 & 8,161?
- "Historical Society committed to preserving Kilmer birthplace". Home News Tribune. April 14, 2008.
- Daily Targum; May 2, 2008; More Missing Numbers: How did the Babylonians develop the Pythagorean triples numbers? Answer: They used numbers 0 and 00 for 13 of the 15 Plimpton 322 tablet lines.

== See also ==
- Plimpton 322
- Pythagorean triple
