= Embo, Sutherland =

Coordinates: 57.90°N 3.98°W

Embo: Scottish Gaelic: Eurabol
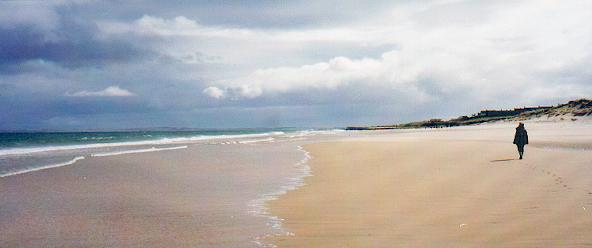
- Embo Beach

- Flag

- Location within the Sutherland area
- Population: 300 (approx.)
- OS grid reference: NH816928
- Council area: Highland
- Lieutenancy area: Sutherland
- Country: Scotland
- Sovereign state: United Kingdom
- Post town: DORNOCH
- Postcode district: IV25
- Dialling code: 01862
- Police: Scotland
- Fire: Scottish
- Ambulance: Scottish
- UK Parliament: Caithness, Sutherland and Easter Ross
- Scottish Parliament: Caithness, Sutherland and Ross constituency in the Highlands and Islands electoral region

Embo (Scottish Gaelic: Eurabol, IPA:[ˈiaɾəpɔɫ̪]) is a village in the Highland Council Area in Scotland and the former postal county of Sutherland, about two miles (three kilometres) north-northeast of Dornoch.

== History ==
The Battle of Embo took place in 1245 between Scots and Vikings.

Bronze Age remains were excavated to the south of the village in 1956, other burials having previously been discovered in the area.

The flag of the Independent State of Embo

On 16 July 1988, Embo declared itself independent from the rest of the United Kingdom for one day. The prime minister was Mr. Donald Ward. This was done to raise funds to convert the unused primary school in the village into a community centre. The school in Embo was designed by William Fowler in 1859.

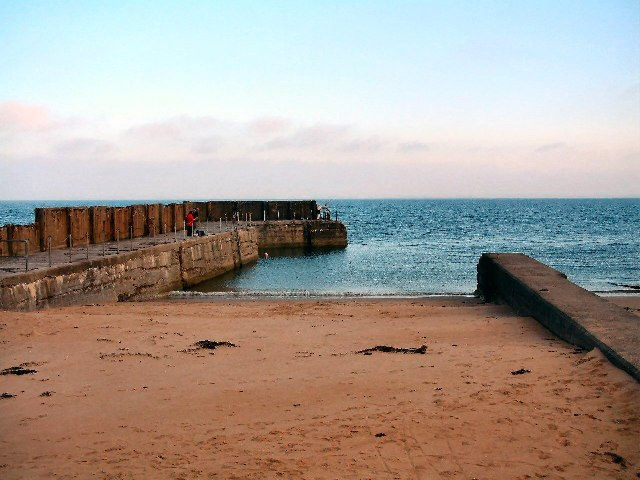
Pier and Embo's harbour

The village issued its own currency, called the Cuddie. The rate of exchange was two Cuddies to the pound. Cuddies were accepted in the local public house, Grannies Heilan' Hame, in exchange for a measure of Clynelish Malt Whisky. The owners of the distillery, in nearby Brora, sponsored the bid for independence by issuing a commemorative label on 50 cases of Clynelish Malt Whisky – "The Spirit of Free Embo".

== Fishing ==
The Annual Reports of the Fishery Board give intesting insights into fishing and social change in Embo. In 1907 they wrote. "The fishermen take part in the various herring fishings, some aboard their own boats, but the majority as hired hands. There is a pier here, but it its too short to be of any service. The haddock yawls are launched from the beach every time they go to sea and laboriously hauled up again on their return". In 1909, commenting on fishing in the Helmsdale District we learn that "for a number of years the local fisheries have been declining...The majority of the fishermen, during the greater part of the year, are employed at herring fishing from various centres in Scotland and from Lowestoft and Yarmouth". In 1913 we learn that ther has been a "falling off in quantity and value. Many of the fishermen were employed during the great part of the year as labourers at the Naval Works, Cromarty. In the following year, the fishermen continued as "labourers at the Admiralty Works, Cromarty and in the Navy since the outbreak of war".

Fishery Statistics

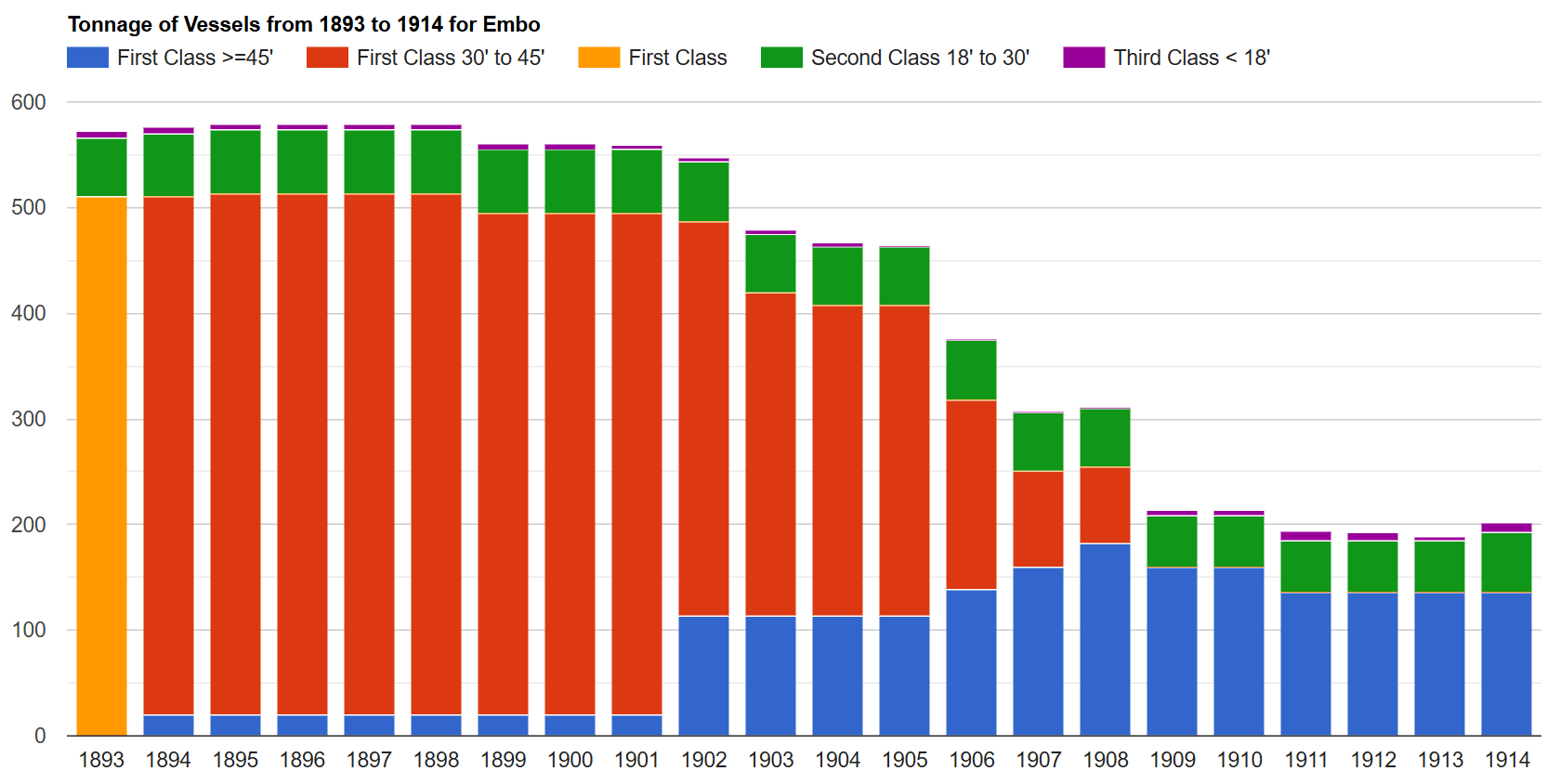
Tonnage of vessels

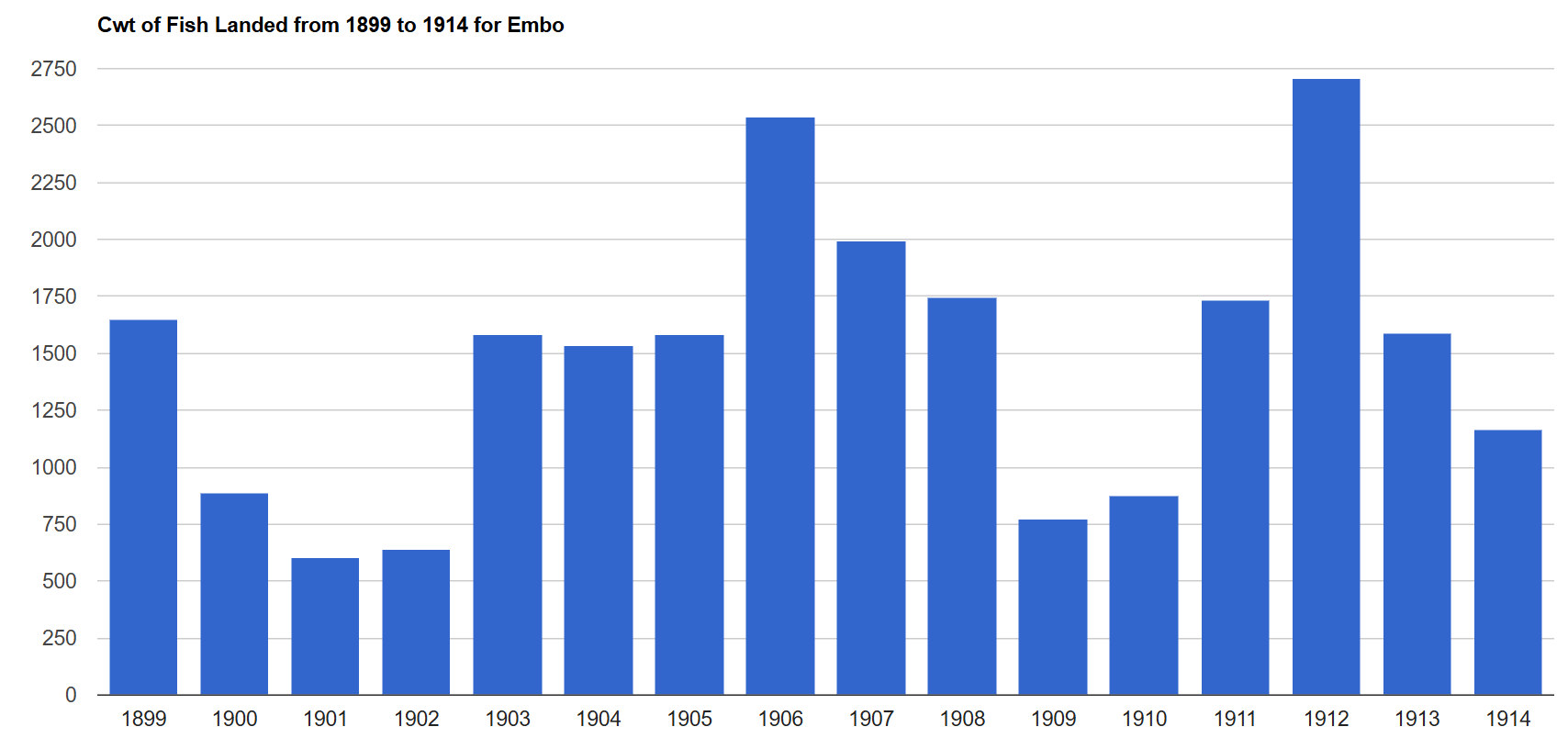
Cwt of fish landed

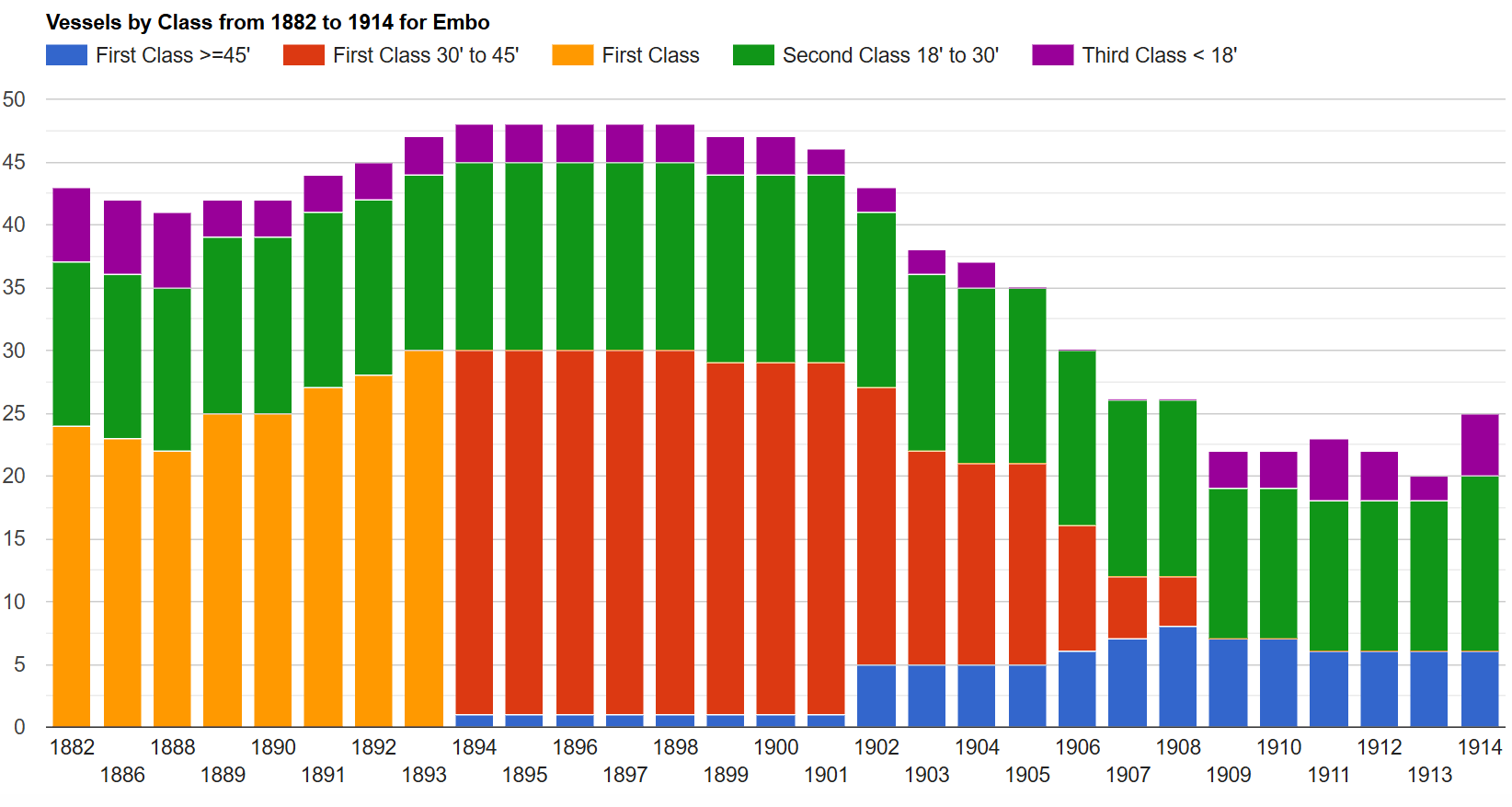
Vessels by class

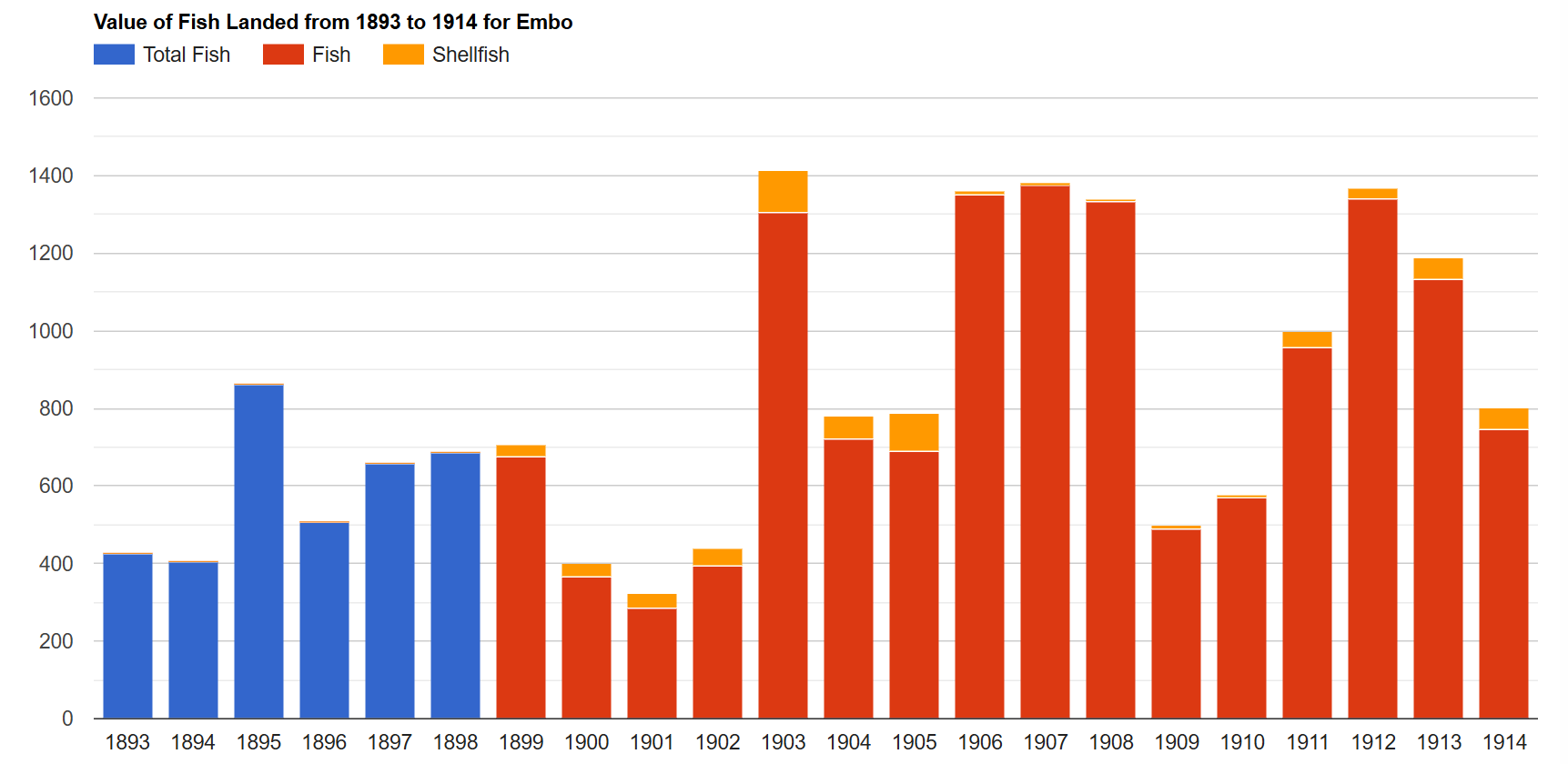
Value (£) of fish landed

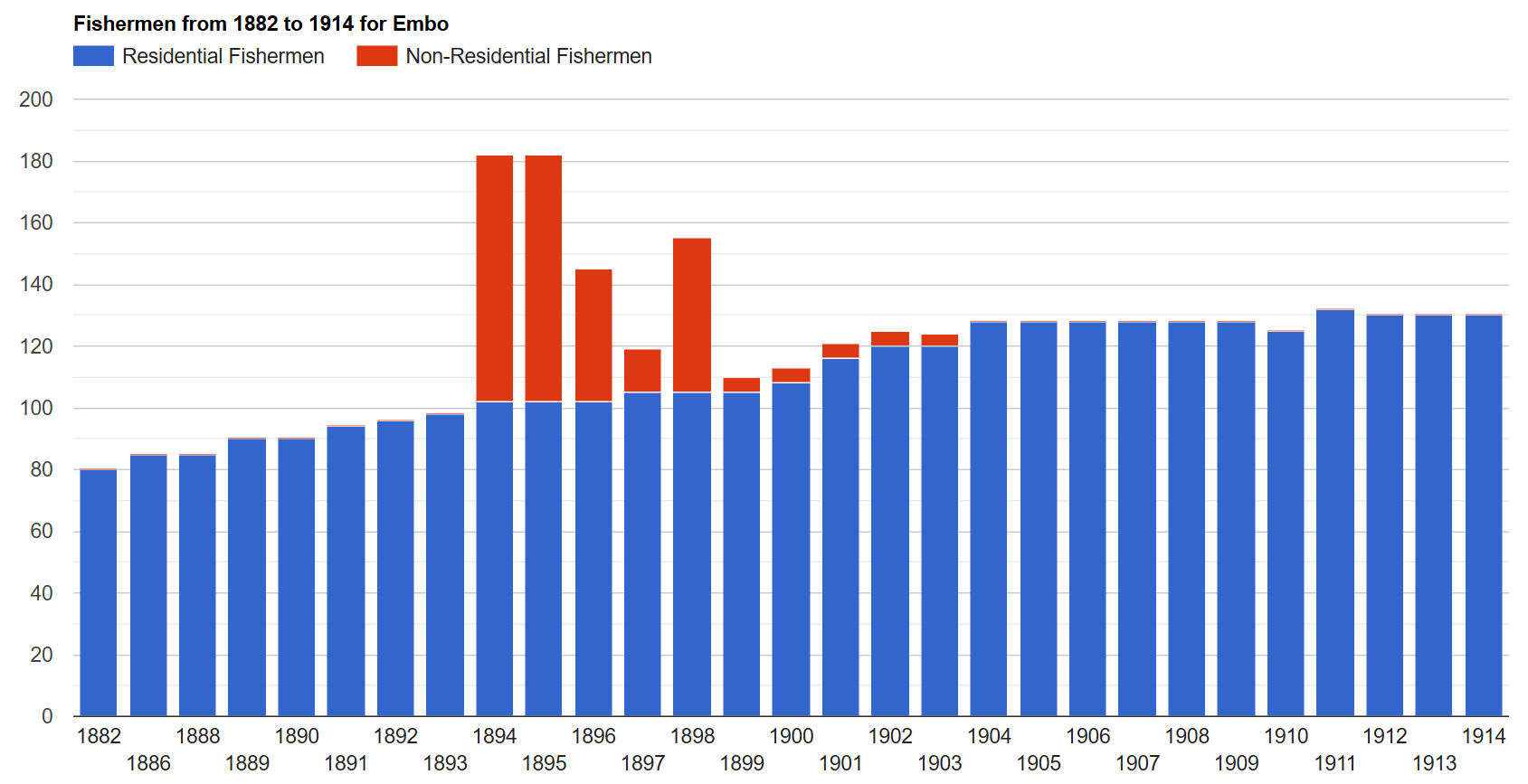
Fishermen

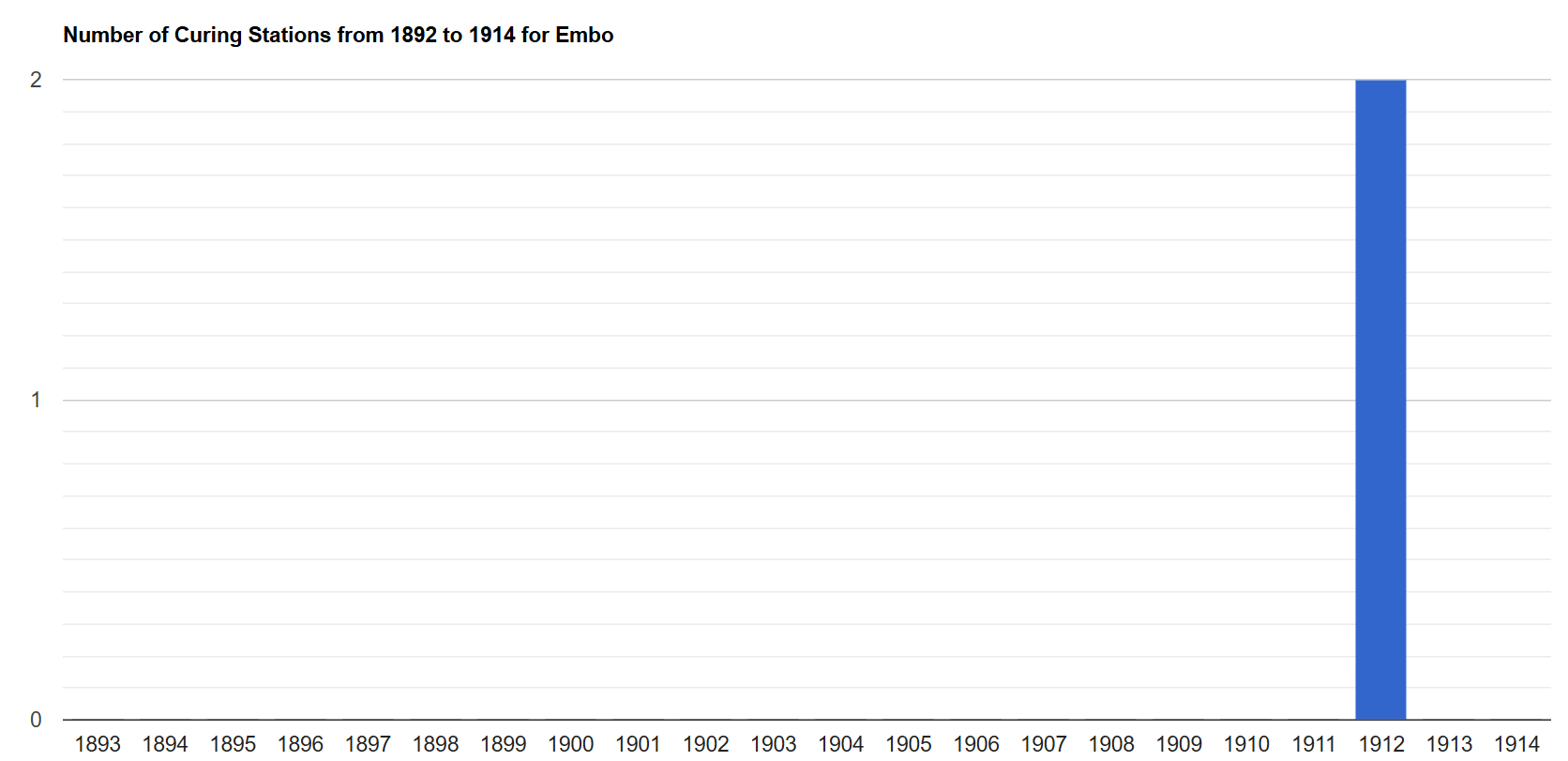
Number of curing stations

== Gaelic ==
Nancy Dorian's research of the local East Sutherland Gaelic dialect showed that in 1964, over 100 of the village's total population of fewer than 300 still actively spoke Gaelic, and that many more had a "smattering" or were perfect passive bilinguals. This percentage even briefly increased during the 1970s with "returners" to the village. Until the end of the 1970s at least, Embo was a bilingual Gaelic and English speaking community. Brora and Golspie had much smaller percentages of Gaelic speakers at that time.

As with the entire region of East Sutherland, the end of the 19th century and the collapse of the fishing industry coincided with the decline of Gaelic as the majority language of the people.

The last two native speakers of East Sutherland Gaelic, sisters Wilma and Jessie Ross, passed away respectively in 2017 and 2020 in Embo.

== Twin towns ==
Embo is informally "twinned" with Kaunakakai on the island of Molokai in Hawaii.

== Environment ==
Coul Links, an area of sand dunes protected as part of a Site of Special Scientific Interest (SSSI), lies to the north of the village. As of February 2019 a company led by American Todd Warnock is proposing to build a golf course on the links; the Scottish Government has referred the proposal to a planning inquiry, which will determine whether the development is to be permitted.

== Transport ==
The nearest railway stations are at Tain and Golspie, both about 10 miles (16 kilometres) away.
