= Olga Von Till =

American classical pianist and piano teacher

- Born: Olga Till; March 27, 1897; New York City, U.S.
- Died: February 6, 1996 (aged 98); New Brunswick, New Jersey, U.S.
- Other names: Olga Kormos, Olga Von Till, Olga vonTill, Olga Von Till Carmell
- Occupation: Pianist
- Known for: Piano teacher of Bill Evans, Barry Miles, and Larry Young. Introducing Hungarian musical influences to Jazz.
- Spouses: Hugó Kormos (m. 1919): Samuel Carmell

Olga Von Till (March 27, 1897 – February 6, 1996) was an American classical pianist and piano teacher.

== Biography ==
Till was born in the borough of Brooklyn, New York, in 1897. As a teenager she worked as a pianist accompanying silent films. At age 17, before World War I broke out, she travelled to Budapest, Hungary, to study with Béla Bartók at the Franz Liszt Academy of Music. Bartok encouraged Till's compositional skills, an indication that he was confident in her talent. While there she also studied under Zoltán Kodály and Ernő Dohnányi.

Von Till returned to the US after the war and taught piano in New Brunswick, New Jersey. Her pupils included Bill Evans, Barry Miles and Larry Young.

When Von Till was studying in Budapest, Bartok, Kodály, and Dohnányi were experimenting with harmonies based on fourths and using pentatonic melodic structures. Von Till carried their influence throughout her life as a musician and teacher. That influence, particularly from Kodály, can be heard in Larry Young's compositions. The common musical sensibilities of Larry Young and Bill Evans were influenced by Von Till with respect to their approaches to lyricism and harmonic expansions particularly with respect to their chords built on fourths. Through Evans and Young, Von Till had influence on Miles Davis, John Coltrane, Cannonball Adderley, Tony Williams, John McLaughlin, Jimi Hendrix, Woody Shaw, Carlos Santana, and Jack Bruce.

Von Till died on February 6, 1996.

== Personal life ==
While living in Hungary, Von Till met Hugó Kormos and married him in 1919. She later married violinist, Sam Carmell.

Von Till was the great-aunt of musician/songwriter Steve Von Till of Neurosis, singer, actress Katherine Von Till, historian Louis S. Warren and documentary filmmaker Richard O'Regan.
