= East Sutherland Gaelic =

Dialect of Scottish Gaelic

- East Sutherlandshire
- Gàidhlig Chataibh
- Pronunciation: [ˈkaːlɪkʲ ˈxaʰt̪ɪv]
- Region: Eastern coast of Sutherland
- Ethnicity: Scots
- Extinct: February 24, 2020, with the death of Jessie Ross
- Language family: Indo-European: Celtic; Insular Celtic; Goidelic; Scottish Gaelic; East Sutherland Gaelic
- Early forms: Proto-Indo-European: Proto-Celtic; Proto-Goidelic; Primitive Irish

Language codes
- ISO 639-3: –
- Glottolog: east2323

East Sutherland Gaelic (Scottish Gaelic: Gàidhlig Chataibh [ˈkaːlɪkʲ ˈxaʰt̪ɪv]) is an extinct dialect of Scottish Gaelic that was spoken in fishing villages on the eastern coast of Sutherland, especially in Brora, Golspie, and Embo.

== History ==
The Scottish Gaelic language has been in decline since the fourteenth century, when its speakers were a majority of Scotland's population, due to the higher prestige of Scots, then later of English. The East Sutherland dialect was spoken in coastal villages by fisherfolk descended from Gaelic speakers who had been evicted from the fertile interior valleys of Sutherland during the Highland Clearances of the early nineteenth century. Because of their occupational, social, and geographical isolation, the fisherfolk retained the use of the Gaelic language about half a century longer than surrounding communities, in the process becoming isolated from other dialects of Gaelic. East Sutherland speakers could only understand other dialects of Gaelic with difficulty, if at all. By the turn of the twentieth century, Gaelic was still the community language; there were even a few monolingual speakers. Although the decline of the fishing industry following World War II had impacted the local dialect's viability, when Nancy Dorian started studying the dialect in 1963, there were still more than 200 speakers in Brora, Golspie and Embo, including 105 in Embo, where they were more than a third of the population.

Dorian found that the Gaelic language was able to adapt to modern life even while becoming moribund, because speakers were able to borrow words from English and apply them to any discussion, even for highly technical topics. She was able to classify speakers as "older fluent speakers", "younger fluent speakers", and "semi-speakers", describing the linguistic differences between each speaker type. The socioeconomically homogeneous community was characterized by a high degree of variation between speakers, even those classified in the same speaker type. Certain types of syntactic distinctions, such as grammatical gender, case markings, and the two passive constructions, were lost gradually, rather than erased wholesale, as some theoreticians had predicted.

By the 1991 census, the number of speakers had declined to less than a twentieth of a century earlier. One of two remaining native speakers, Wilma Ross of Embo, died in 2017; her sister Jessie was the terminal speaker until her death in 2020.

== Study ==
The East Sutherland dialect became well known in the field of language death based on the research by Nancy Dorian, beginning in 1963. Dorian's 1981 book Language Death: The Life Cycle of a Scottish Gaelic Dialect, was described by Wolfgang U. Dressler as "the first major monograph" on language death.
