= Columbia Trail =

Rail trail in New Jersey, US

Coordinates: 40°44′50″N 74°49′34″W

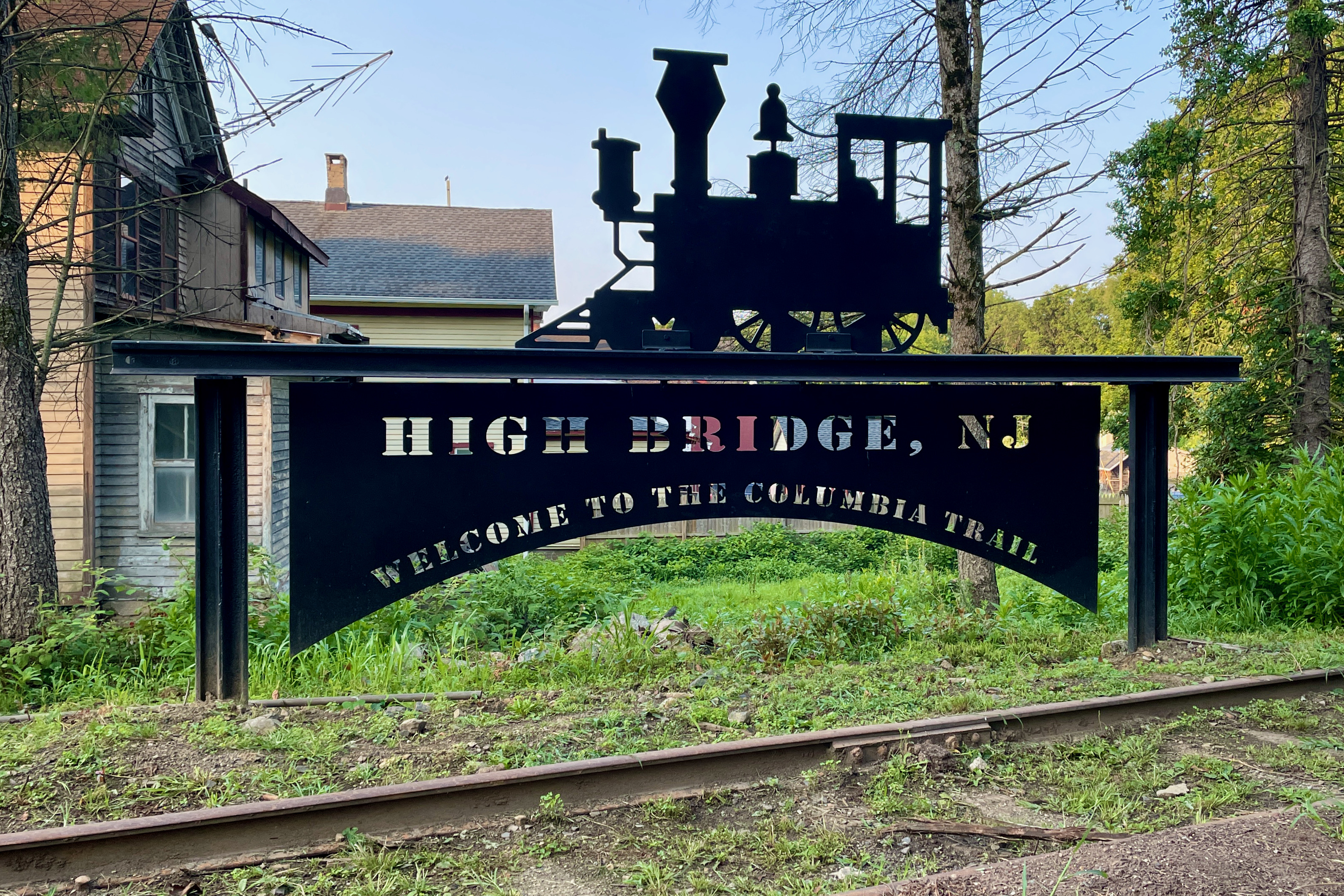
- Columbia Trail in High Bridge, New Jersey
- Length: 15.0 mi (24.1 km)
- Location: Hunterdon County & Morris County
- Trailheads: Main Street in High Bridge, Bartley Road in Washington Township
- Use: Hiking, Cycling
- Difficulty: Easy
- Season: Year round
- Surface: Stone dust
- Right of way: Central Railroad of New Jersey

The Columbia Trail is a rail trail in rural northwestern New Jersey. It was created from portions of the former Central Railroad of New Jersey High Bridge Branch and stretches from High Bridge, in Hunterdon County, to Washington Township, in Morris County, for a total of 15.1 miles (24.3 km). The trail surface is relatively flat and consists mostly of fine crushed stone.

== History ==
Lewis H. Taylor, a member of the trustees of the Central Jersey Railroad, brought the railroad to High Bridge in 1876. The branch line was originally built to transport coal and iron ore from mines in Morris County for use in the Taylor Wharton Iron and Steel Company, the oldest foundry in United States history, and other foundries at High Bridge or Wharton. The High Bridge Branch was also used for passenger traffic until 1935.

In 1976, the branch was deemed redundant by its new owner, Conrail, and the rails were dismantled in 1980. In the mid-1990s, the Columbia Gas Transmission company bought the trail right-of-way and laid an underground gas pipeline under the right-of-way along the length of the trail. The trail and bridges were resurfaced in 2004. Since then, it has been a recreational trail serving the surrounding communities.

The Hunterdon County Division of Parks and Recreation and Morris County Park Commission now operate and maintain the trail under lease, although ownership of the right-of-way remains with the Columbia Gas Company.

A train wreck occurred on the Ken Lockwood Gorge Bridge on April 18, 1885. An iron ore train led by the coincidentally named Columbia Engine derailed on the trestle and crashed into the river below. Iron Mine Railroads of Northern New Jersey, by Larry Lowenthal, indicates that this was engine 112 and does not indicate that it had a name. A contemporary account of the wreck in the Iron Era newspaper does not cite a name, only the engine number. If the locomotive had a name it's probable it would have been mentioned in those days. The trail is, instead, most likely named for the Columbia Gas Pipeline. Minutes of meetings in Hunterdon Parks indicate that Hunterdon suggested the name Columbia Trail, much to the satisfaction of the gas company. Opposition to gas utilities and their relationship to hydraulic fracturing (aka "Fracking") have spurred public outcry to rename the route High Bridge Branch Trail, a more historically accurate and less controversial tag. Furthermore, it may be considered a conflict of interest for a government agency to promote a private industry such as Columbia Gas in name and associated publications (taxpayer-funded maps, guides, interpretive signage, etc.).

== Route ==
The Columbia Trail runs from High Bridge in Hunterdon County northeast to Washington Township in Morris County. The route is scenic, as the meandering South Branch of the Raritan River parallels the trail along most of its route across two counties. The trail passes through Califon in Hunterdon County and Long Valley in Morris County. Just north of Long Valley, Patriots' Path provides links east towards County Route 513 and west towards Schooley's Mountain Park. Also in Long Valley the trail runs adjacent to the New Jersey Department of Environmental Protection South Branch Wildlife Management Area, which has some unmarked trails to the north.

Beyond the northeastern end of the trail on the border of Washington and Mt. Olive Townships, an active rail line is still in service and operated by the Morristown and Erie Railway to Wharton. The trail connects to the New Jersey Transit Raritan Valley Line at High Bridge and connects to Patriots Path in Long Valley.

A notable portion of the Columbia Trail is the Ken Lockwood Gorge, between Califon and High Bridge (2 1/2 miles north of High Bridge). The South Branch of the Raritan River parallels the trail through the gorge and is a scenic fast-flowing small river with recreational activities, especially fly fishing. A 60-foot (18 m) trestle carries the trail over the river in the gorge.

There are few remnants of the former rail line along the trail, except for the occasional rotting railroad cross ties along the trail. There is a small section of track preserved in Califon and a small and rarely open museum dedicated to the rail line history is located in the preserved train station in the town center.

== Trail access ==
The southern trailhead is located in High Bridge at 79 Main Street. The trail begins on the east side of Main Street across from the entrance to Commons Park, where parking is available.

The northern trailhead is located in Washington Township at the border with Mt. Olive on Bartley Road (Morris Cty 625). There is a small public parking area across from the current end of the Morristown & Erie rail line. There is another public parking area in Long Valley off Schooley's Mountain Road between Fairview Avenue and Maple Lane, across from The Coffee Potter (the old Long Valley train station when the Central Railroad of New Jersey train line passed through the area).

== Gallery ==
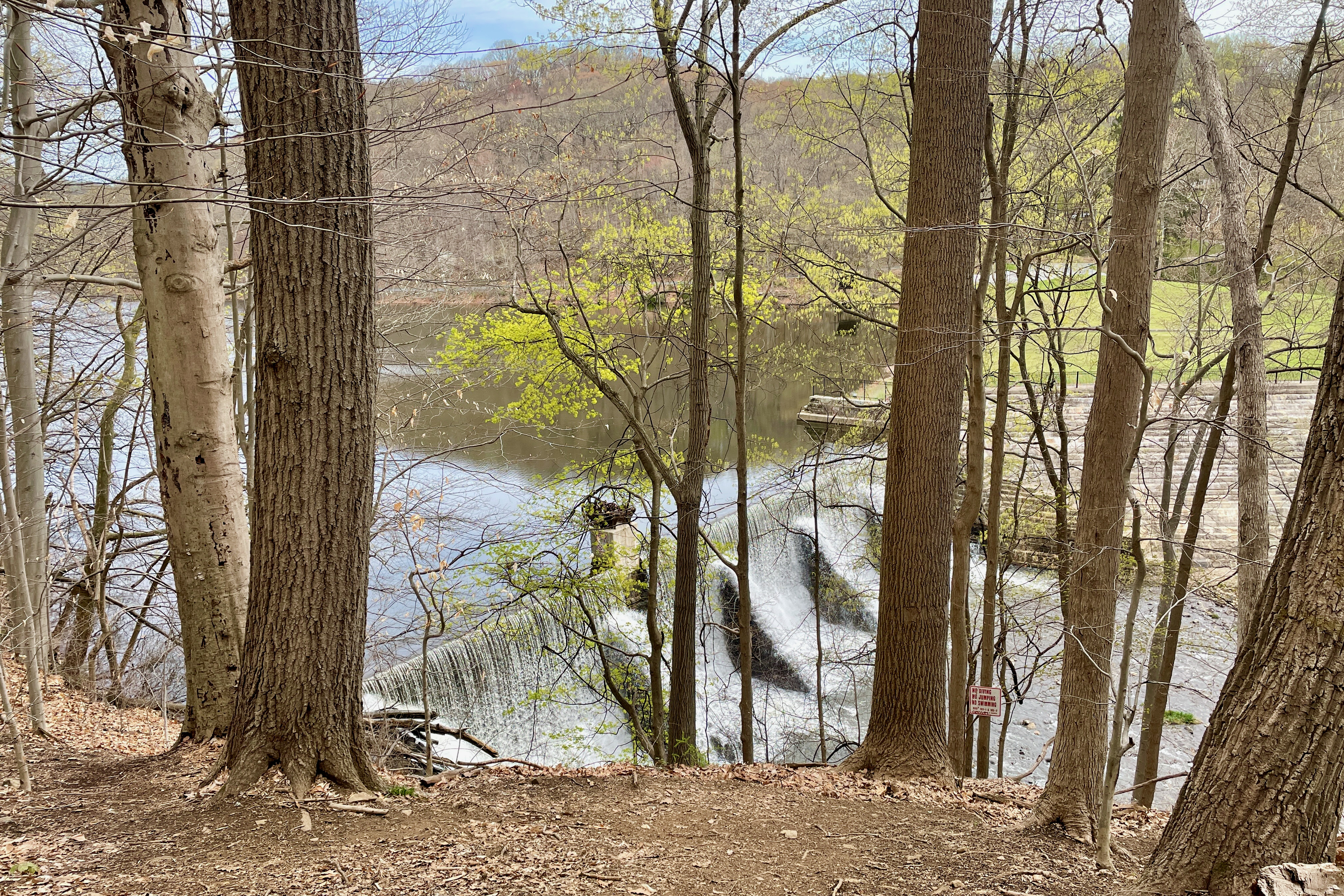
Trailside view of Lake Solitude and Waterfall in High Bridge

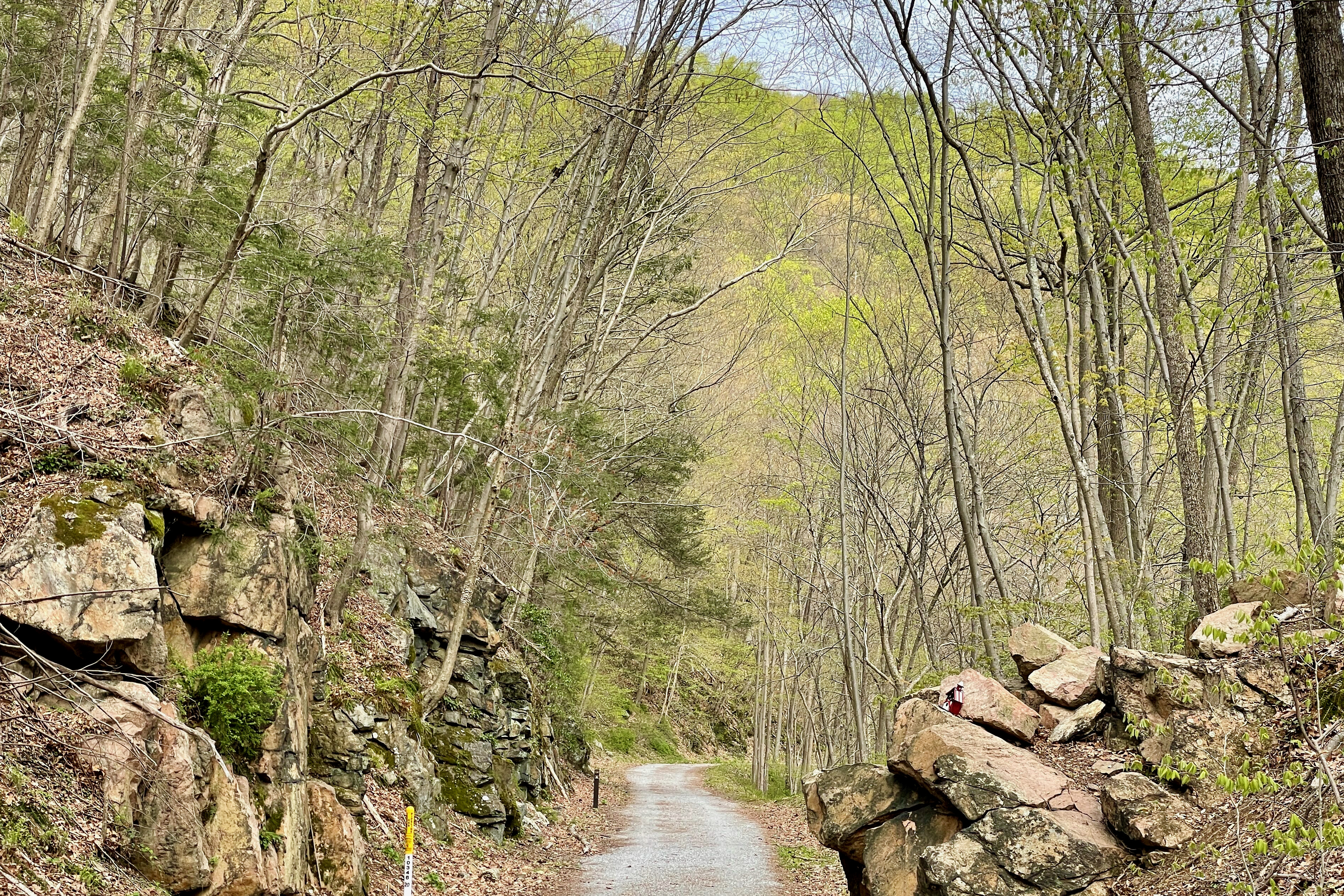
Passing through the Ken Lockwood Gorge

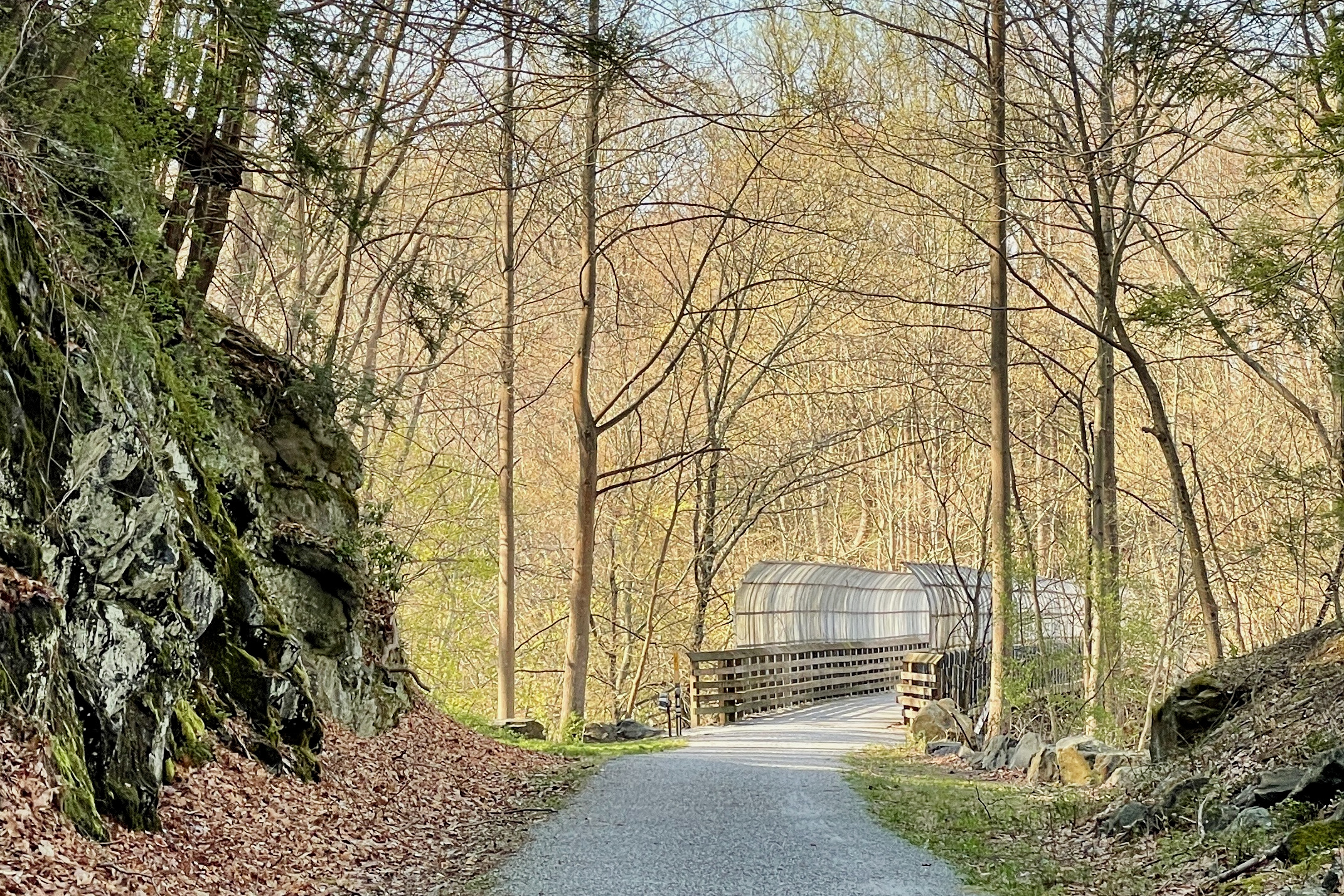
Approaching the Ken Lockwood Gorge Bridge
