= High Bridge Branch =

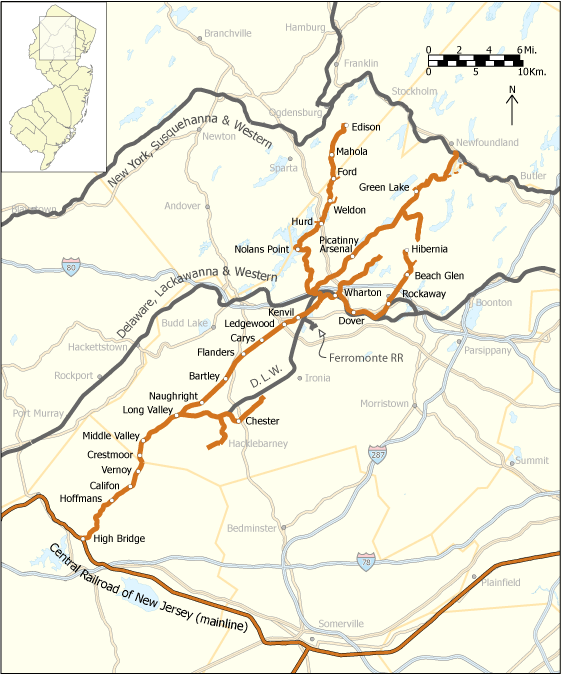
CNJ High Bridge Branch

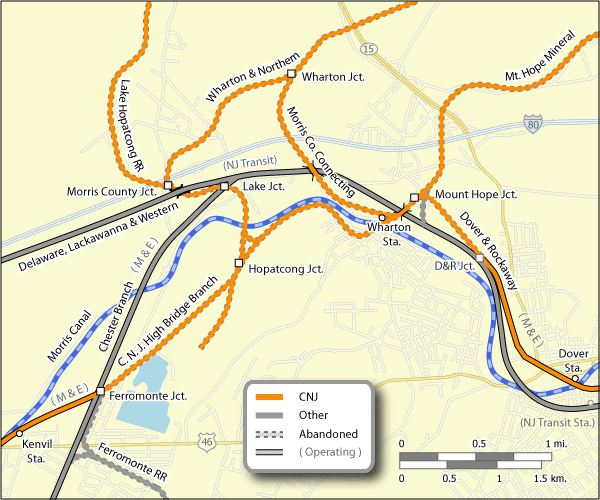
Detail of High Bridge Junctions in the Dover area

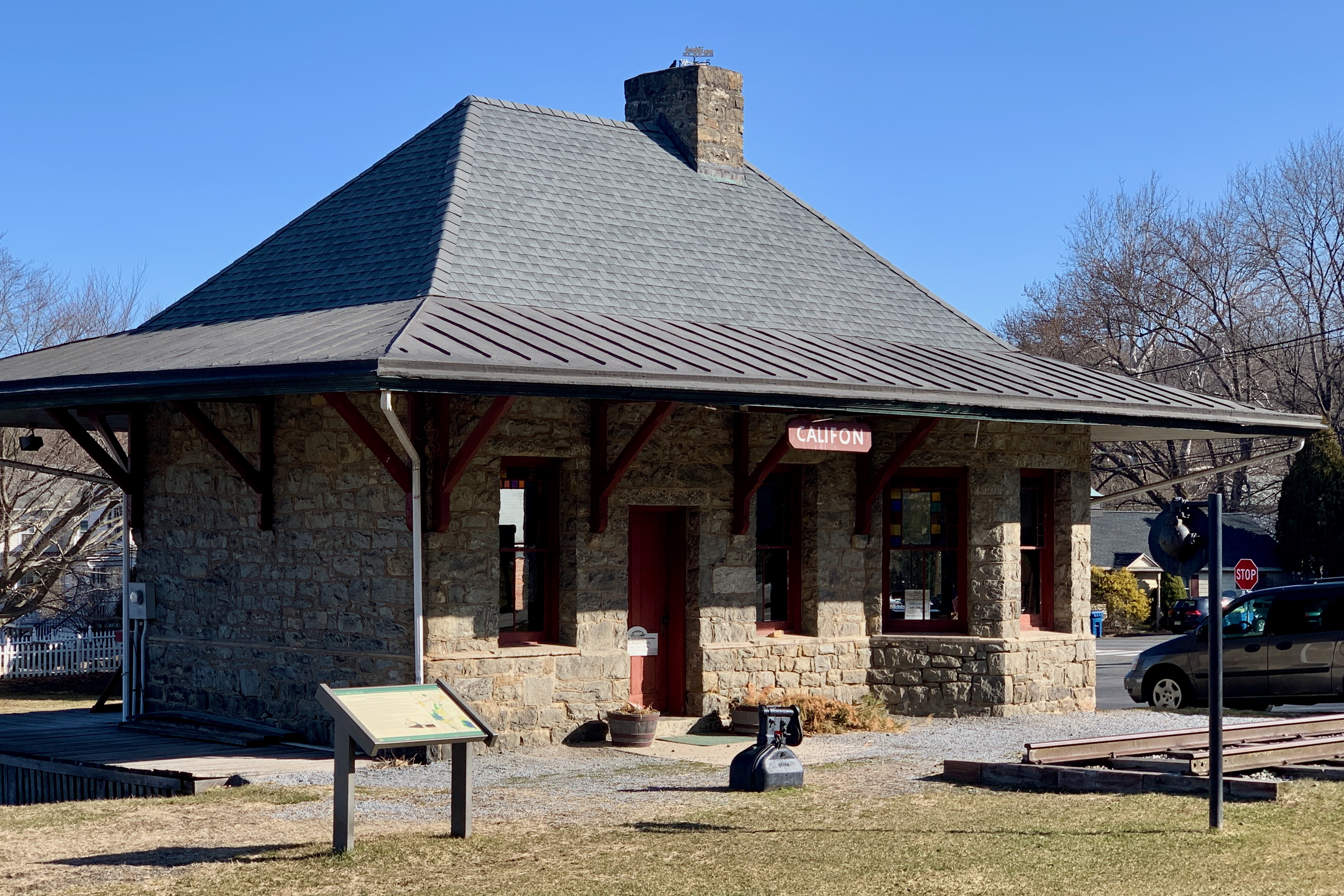
Califon station

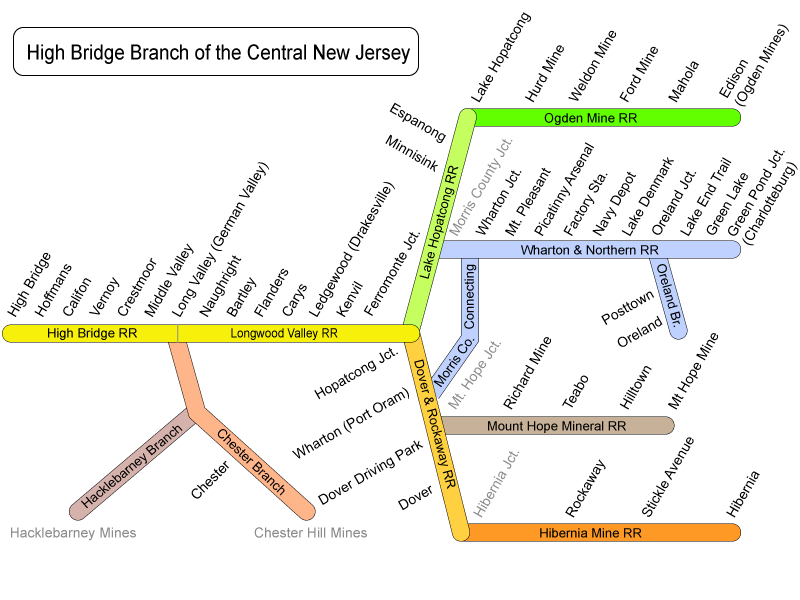
Schematic map of the High Bridge Branch at its greatest extent

The High Bridge Branch is a branch line that was operated by the Central Railroad of New Jersey (CNJ). As built, the branch started in High Bridge, New Jersey at a connection with the CNJ main line and continued north to iron-ore mines in Morris County. The High Bridge Branch line followed the South Branch Raritan River for much of its length.

Portions of the branch are operated by the Dover and Rockaway River Railroad.

== History ==
The High Bridge Branch connected to the Delaware, Lackawanna & Western Railroad (DL&W) and the Wharton & Northern Railroad just west of Wharton, New Jersey and to the Mount Hope Mineral Railroad and the Dover & Rockaway Railroad in Wharton. It originally connected with the Chester Branch of the DL&W at Chester north of U.S. Route 206, but from Long Valley to Chester became the Chester Branch when the railroad was extended north from Long Valley to the Wharton area. The line once carried both freight and passengers, with iron ore being its primary commodity.

The High Bridge Branch was not included in the Conrail network in 1976. The section north of Bartley remained in use under a state subsidy agreement. The Bartley-High Bridge section was converted to the Columbia rail trail; the section from the crossing of the High Bridge Branch and the DL&W Chester Branch to Main Street, Wharton was abandoned; the portion in Wharton is being converted to a rail trail.

The Bartley-Kenvil section was purchased by Morris County from the State of New Jersey on 1986 and leased to regional short line operator Morristown & Erie Railway (M&E). Shortly thereafter, a new track connection was built east of Kenvil with the former DL&W Chester Branch named Ferromonte Junction.

Freight customers were sought after county acquisition. first was R. P. Smith & Co., a brick customer near Route 10 in Ledgewood. Service began on May 2, 1988. Within the next few years, the railroad was opened to Flanders to a plastic extruding company and ultimately to Bartley where Toys "R" Us built an almost fully automated regional distribution center of 1/2 million square feet with a footprint to expand to 1,000,000 square feet (93,000 m^{2}). The line currently ends in Bartley, just south of Toys "R" Us. Frank Reilly, Executive Director of the Morris County Department of Transportation Management and M&E president were responsible for current operations on the line.

== Current status ==
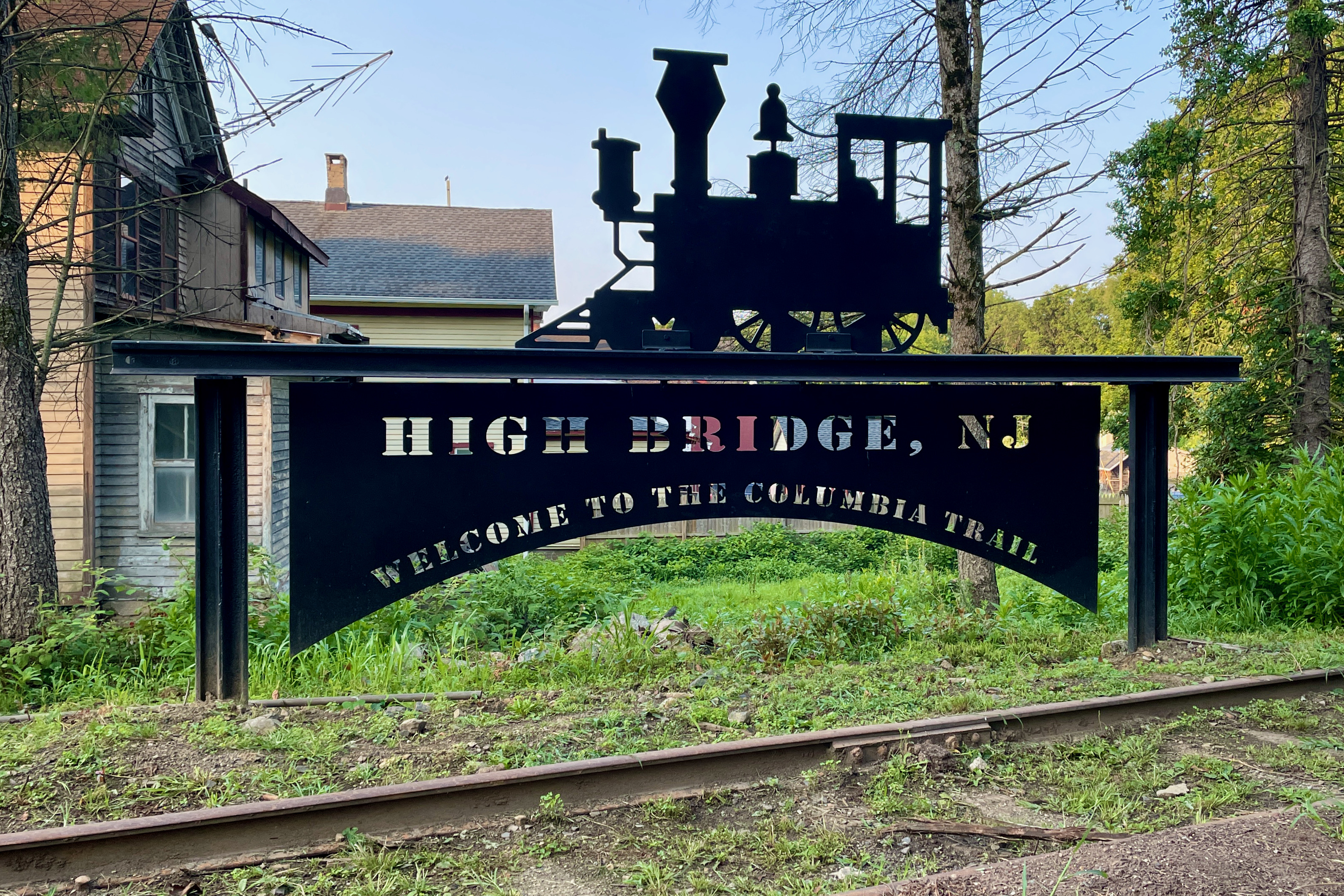
Start of the Columbia Trail and wye track in High Bridge

Few remnants remain of the line; occasional rotting wooden ties can be found along the rail trails. The former CNJ wye connection is still partially present in High Bridge in the parking area for the trail as is the Ken Lockwood Gorge Bridge above the South Branch Raritan River. In April 1885, the bridge collapsed as a train was going over it, sending several freight cars and at least one locomotive into the river.

There is a small section of track preserved in Califon and a small museum in the restored former Califon passenger station. The freight station in Flanders (on Hillside Avenue) is now a jeweler's store.

The remaining northern section of the High Bridge Branch has been owned by Morris County and managed under the auspices of the County's Department of Transportation (MCDOT) since 1986. It is operated under a lease agreement by the Dover & Rockaway River Railroad (D&R), effective July 1, 2017. The branch starts at Ferromonte Junction, which is a switch on the Chester Branch. Until October 2013, the only active customer on the line was Blue Ridge Lumber which unloads cars at the Kenvil Team Track off U.S. Route 46. In October 2013, Triumph Plastics began receiving carloads of plastic at their facility in Flanders, NJ which marked the first revenue freight train to operate beyond Kenvil since 2008.

South of Bartley to High Bridge is owned by the Hunterdon and Morris County Park Commissions with an easement in perpetuity by the Columbia Gas Company. Bartley to just east of Kenvil is owned by the Morris County Department of Transportation, and just east of the County ownership in Kenvil is privately owned. A portion of the former railroad in Wharton is owned by Wharton Borough.

== Timeline ==
- 1868: The private 1.2-mile (1.9 km) High Bridge Railroad is built to connect the Taylor furnace at High Bridge to the CNJ mainline.
- 1872: The High Bridge Railroad obtains a charter to build from High Bridge to a connection at German Valley (Long Valley) with the Chester Railroad, a Morris and Essex branch leased by the DL&W.
- 1874: CNJ purchases the Longwood Valley Railroad (chartered 1867) and completes construction from German Valley to Port Oram. The line is opened in 1876.
- 1876: High Bridge Branch is completed and opened for service, with branches on the northern portions extending to iron ore mining operations in Morris County.
- 1881: CNJ leases the Ogden Mine Railroad and begins construction of the Lake Hopatcong Railroad connection to the High Bridge Branch.
- 1881: CNJ leases the Dover & Rockaway (organized in 1880) for 999 years. The lease connects the High Bridge Branch to the Hibernia Mine Railroad.
- 1882: High point of the railroad traffic with 118 cars filled with iron-ore using the tracks in one day.
- 1885: The most memorable train wreck in the history of the High Bridge Branch occurred on the morning of Saturday, April 18, 1885 when the central and southern spans of the 250' long Gorge Bridge (now called the Ken Lockwood Gorge Bridge) collapsed as a heavily laden iron ore train drawn by a powerful Baldwin 4-6-0 locomotive (#112) named Columbia, just started to cross the southern span of the wooden Howe truss bridge.
- 1890: The Hibernia Mine Railroad is leased by the CNJ.
- 1890s: An estimated 50,000 passengers per year ride the excursion trains to Lake Hopatcong on up to six daily passenger trains during the summer months.
- 1930: CNJ purchases the Wharton & Northern Railroad, obtaining a connection with the New York, Susquehanna, & Western at Green Pond Junction. The purchase includes 68% of the Mount Hope Mineral Railroad. By that time, those roads carried freight, but had no scheduled passenger service.
- April 1, 1932: Last passenger train runs on the line.
- 1971: CNJ petitions to abandon the High Bridge Branch, but a proposed Sears warehouse in Mount Olive Township saves the branch. The Wharton & Northern Branch was abandoned the same year due to washouts which led to its embargo with the NYSW.
- 1972–1976: CNJ discontinues operations in Pennsylvania and transfers operations to the Lehigh Valley Railroad. In order to continue to serve customers in Scranton, Pennsylvania and maintain interchange there, CNJ in conjunction with the Erie Lackawanna establishes trains ES-99/SE-98 which operate over the CNJ mainline from Elizabethport to High Bridge, the High Bridge Branch from High Bridge to Lake Junction, and the Erie Lackawanna Railway from Lake Junction to Scranton.
- 1976: Most of the CNJ network becomes part of the federally created Conrail system. The High Bridge Branch line is not included in Conrail, because it duplicates other routes in the newly created system, however is transferred to the New Jersey Department of Transportation (NJDOT) per subsidy agreement. The line up to just beyond the Bartley Road in Flanders is maintained, but the portion south of it from Bartley to High Bridge abandoned.
- 1979: There were supposed intentions New Jersey Transit would operate the line to connect service between their Raritan Valley Line at High Bridge (the former CNJ mainline) and their Morristown Line at Lake Junction (the former DLW mainline). This was never finalized.
- 1980: Track was removed between Flanders and High Bridge.
- 1986: Portion of the High Bridge Branch from Kenvil to Bartley Road in Flanders was purchased by Morris County; leased for operation and maintenance to the M&E, a regional shortline operator, who continues to operate it today under a lease agreement with the County.
- 1988: First portion of the County owned High Bridge Branch (Kenvil-Ledgewood) was opened on May 2, 1988 with NS business car "Blue Ridge" and one box car load of bricks from Georgia as the entire train. Several officials were on board for the historic re-opening of the northern portion of the railroad.
- 1995: Columbia Gas Transmission of West Virginia constructed a gas line under the former railbed, and the surface rights for the former High Bridge Branch line are transferred to the Hunterdon County Department of Parks and Recreation and Morris County Parks and Recreation for use as a recreational trail, known as Columbia Trail. Also a New Jersey Department of Transportation Rail Freight Program grant was obtained by the County to restore the remaining trackage in Morris County to FRA Class 2 track.
- 2004: The Columbia Trail was resurfaced by the county parks departments.
- 2009–2017: M&E operates an annual "Toys For Tots" train on the line in December in partnership with local organizations with stops at Flanders (Hillside Avenue/Main Street at firehouse), Succasunna (NJ Route 10) and Kenvil (U.S. Route 46).
- 2017: Dover & Rockaway River Railroad (D&R) assumes operation and control of the High Bridge Branch from M&E, effective July 1.
- 2019: Chesapeake and Delaware LLC completes extensive maintenance on the line including the replacement of countless cross-ties, spikes, tie plates, and rails in certain spots.

== See also ==
- Cary station (New Jersey)
- Morristown and Erie Railway

== Sources ==
- Della Penna, 1999: chapter 5
