= Ken Lockwood Gorge =

Ken Lockwood Gorge Wildlife Management Area
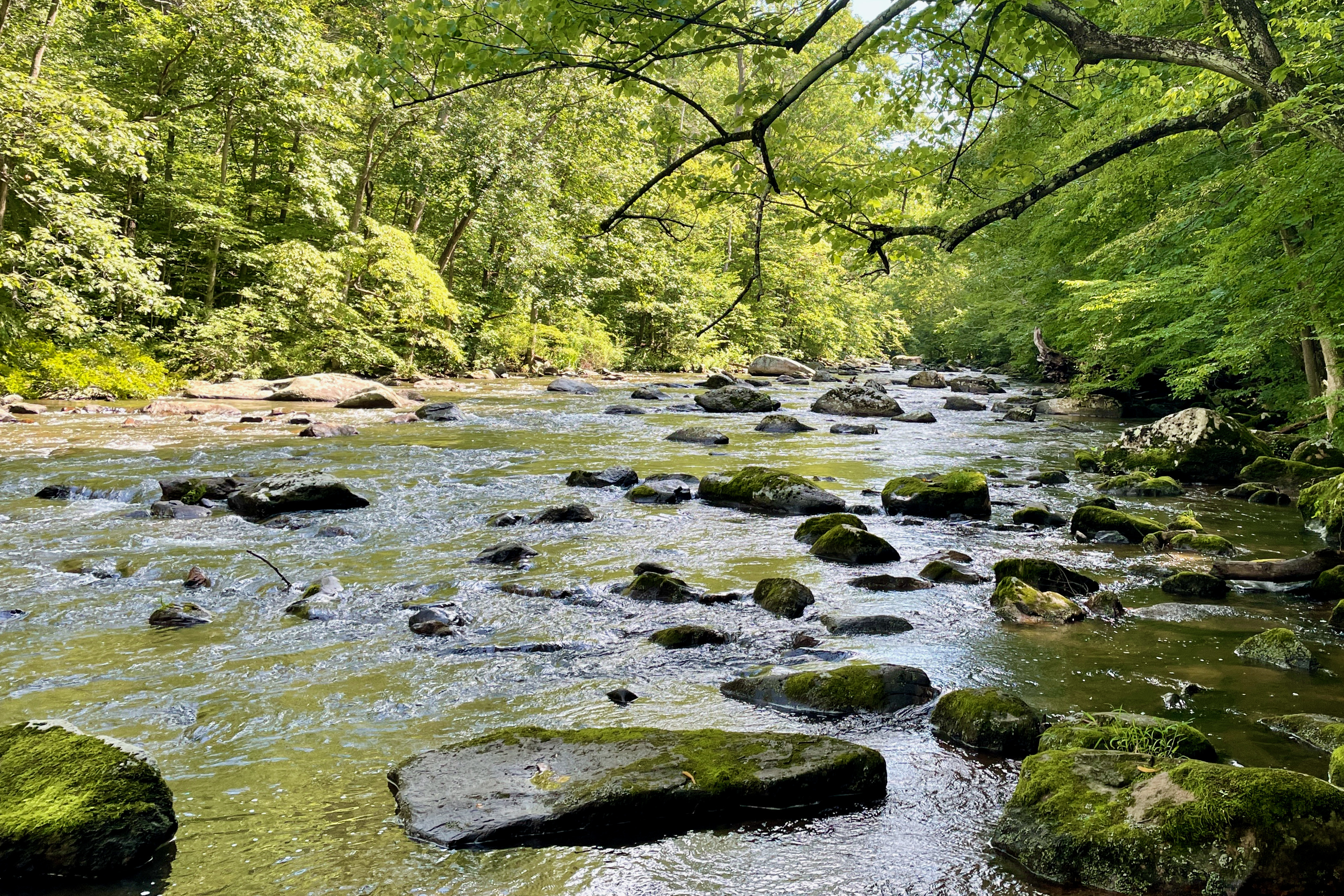
- The South Branch Raritan River flowing through the gorge

- Location within Hunterdon County, New Jersey Location within New Jersey Location within the United States
- Location: Lebanon Township, Hunterdon County, New Jersey
- Nearest city: Califon, High Bridge
- Coordinates: 40°41′45″N 74°52′19″W
- Area: 563 acres (228 ha)
- Governing body: New Jersey Division of Fish and Wildlife

Ken Lockwood Gorge is between Califon and High Bridge in Lebanon Township of Hunterdon County, New Jersey. It was purchased in 1948 by the Division of Fish, Game and Wildlife and has been referred to as “one of New Jersey's most beautiful places.” It is presently administered by the New Jersey Division of Fish and Wildlife.

The 2½-mile (4 km) stretch of the South Branch Raritan River comprises the central feature of this 563-acre (228 ha) Wildlife Management Area. Steep, hilly woodlands host a plethora of flora and fauna including both game and non-game varieties, including a diverse population of birds and mammals.

Ken Lockwood Gorge is best known as a trout fishing destination. The New Jersey Division of Fish & Wildlife has designated the area as a "Trout Conservation Area", in which a separate set of rules apply. The limits are different from most other sections of the Raritan River, and fishing with bait is prohibited.

The gorge is named after Kenneth F. Lockwood, an outdoor journalist and conservationist. Ken Lockwood was best known for his column, "Out In The Open", which ran in the now-defunct Newark Evening News. He was also a strong advocate for land conservation, promoting setting aside land for hunting and fishing. Ken Lockwood died on April 2, 1948, on the way home from his weekly radio program. Ken Lockwood Gorge was named after him a short time later.

The Columbia Trail passes through the gorge and crosses the river on the Ken Lockwood Gorge Bridge.

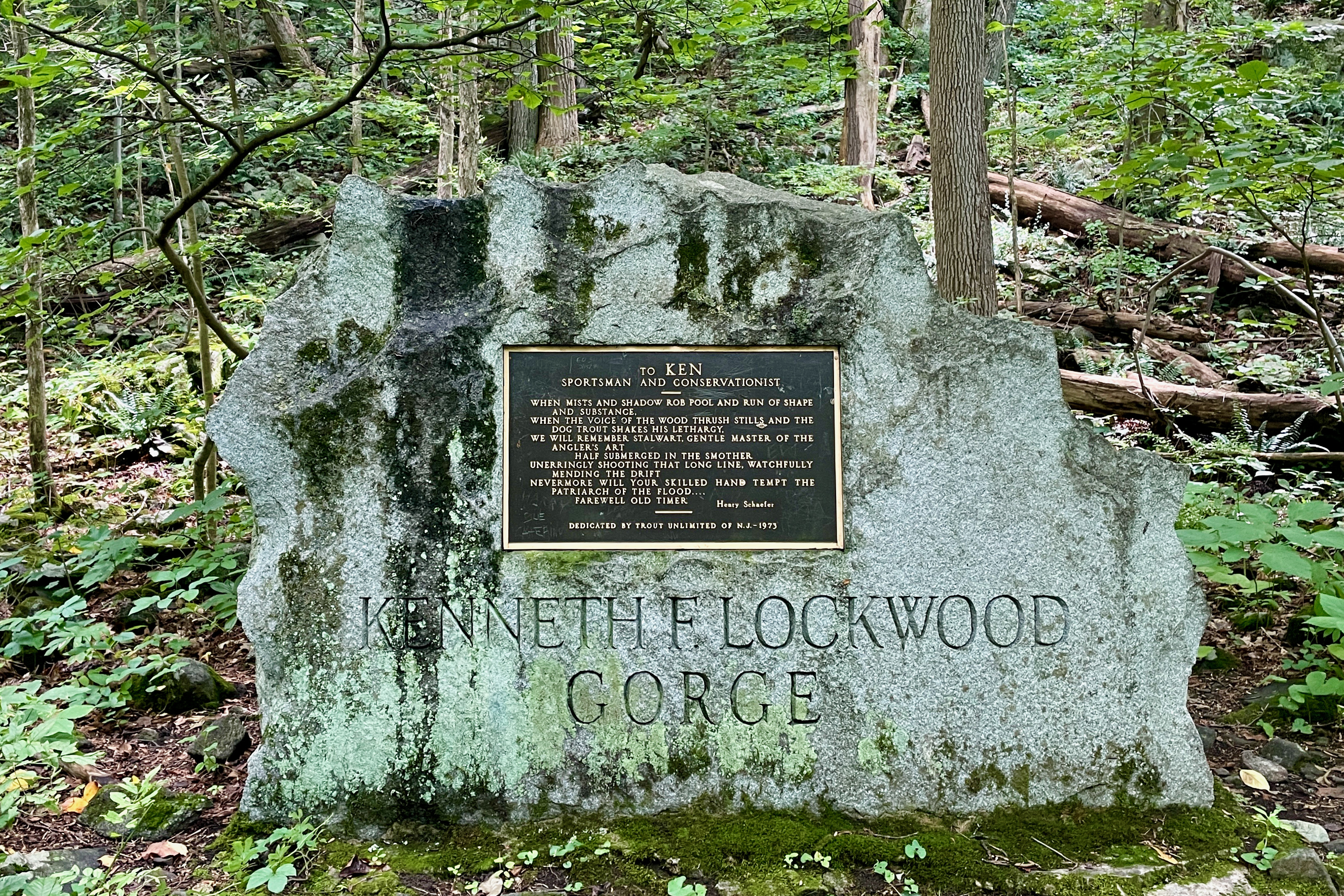
Kenneth F. Lockwood monument

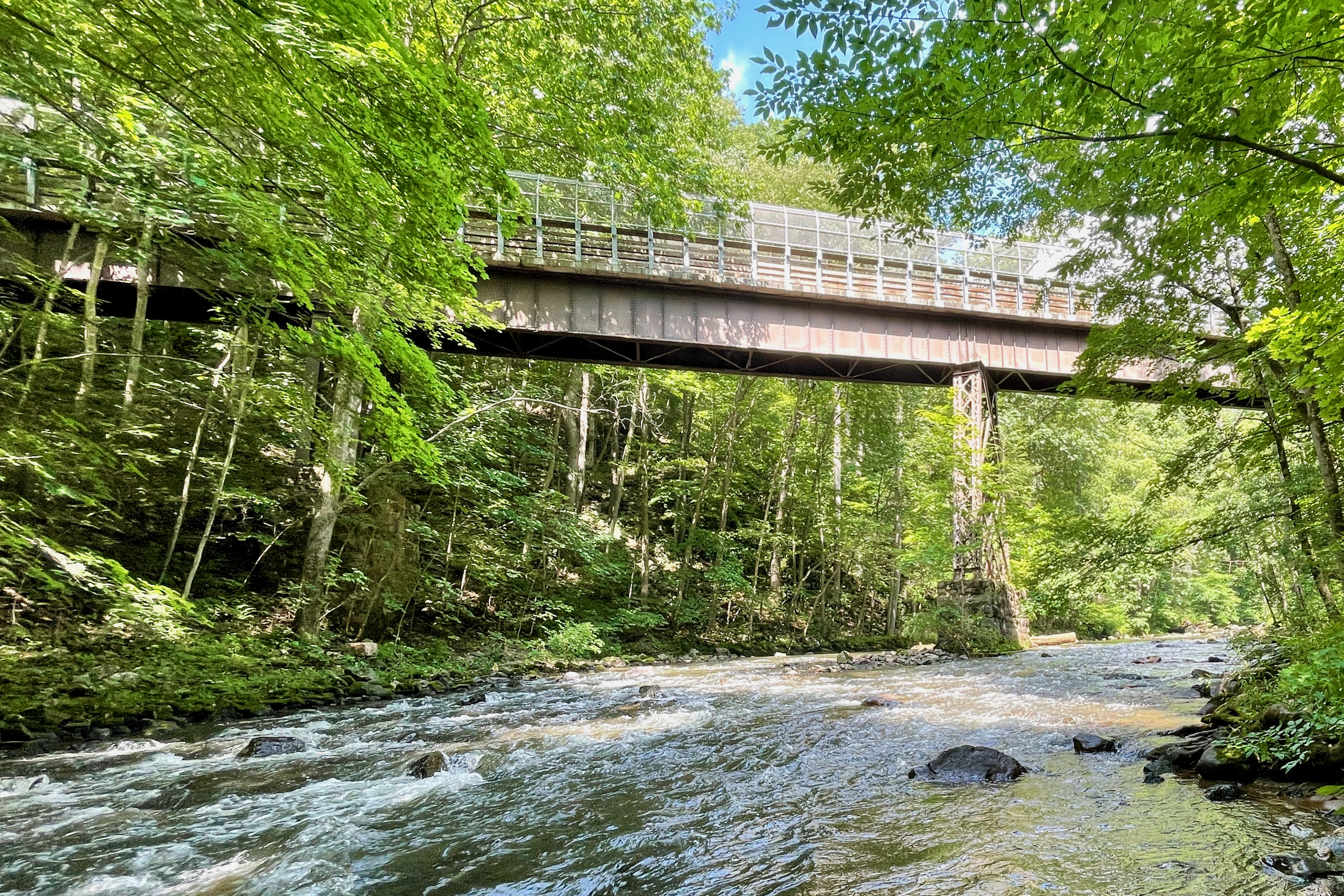
Ken Lockwood Gorge Bridge

== See also ==
- List of New Jersey wildlife management areas
