= Califon, New Jersey =

Borough in Hunterdon County, New Jersey, US

- Borough
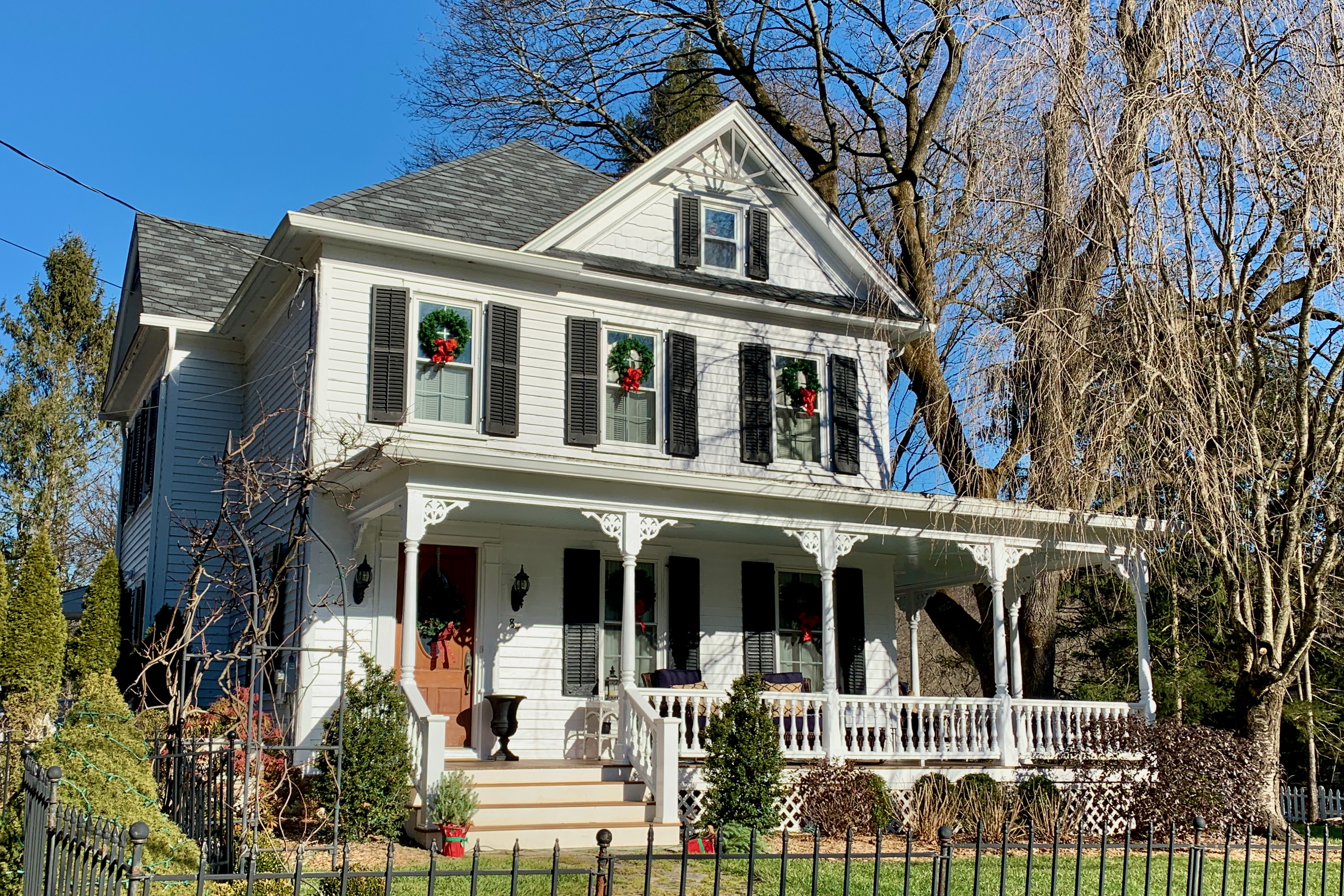
- Victorian house on Main Street

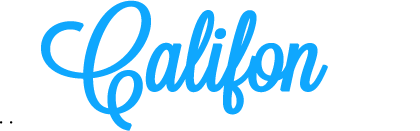
- wordmark

- Location of Califon in Hunterdon County highlighted in red (left). Inset map: Location of Hunterdon County in New Jersey highlighted in orange (right).

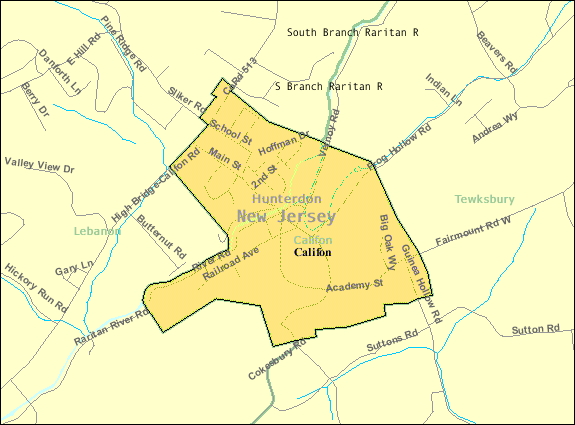
- Census Bureau map of Califon, New Jersey

- Location in Hunterdon County Location in New Jersey Location in the United States
- Coordinates: 40°43′09″N 74°50′13″W
- Country: United States
- State: New Jersey
- County: Hunterdon
- Incorporated: April 2, 1918
- Named after: California

Government
  - Type: Borough
  - Body: Borough Council
  - Mayor: Charles Daniel (D, term ends December 31, 2026)
  - Administrator / Municipal clerk: Karen Mastro

Area
  - Total: 0.98 sq mi (2.54 km^{2})
  - Land: 0.96 sq mi (2.48 km^{2})
  - Water: 0.019 sq mi (0.05 km^{2}) 2.04%
  - Rank: 502nd of 565 in state 23rd of 26 in county
- Elevation: 479 ft (146 m)

Population (2020)
  - Total: 1,005
  - Estimate (2023): 1,013
  - Rank: 531st of 565 in state 24th of 26 in county
  - Density: 1,048.1/sq mi (404.7/km^{2})
  - Rank: 378th of 565 in state 8th of 26 in county
- Time zone: UTC−05:00 (Eastern (EST))
  - Summer (DST): UTC−04:00 (Eastern (EDT))
- ZIP Code: 07830
- Area code: 908
- FIPS code: 3401909280
- GNIS feature ID: 885176
- Website: www.califonboro.org

Califon is a borough in Hunterdon County, in the U.S. state of New Jersey. As of the 2020 United States census, the borough's population was 1,005, a decrease of 71 (−6.6%) from the 2010 census count of 1,076, which in turn reflected an increase of 21 (+2.0%) from the 1,055 counted in the 2000 census.

The borough's name is said to have been inspired by the California gold rush of 1849. The name was shortened to Califon, supposedly because the longer name could not be fit on signs at the train station.

== History ==
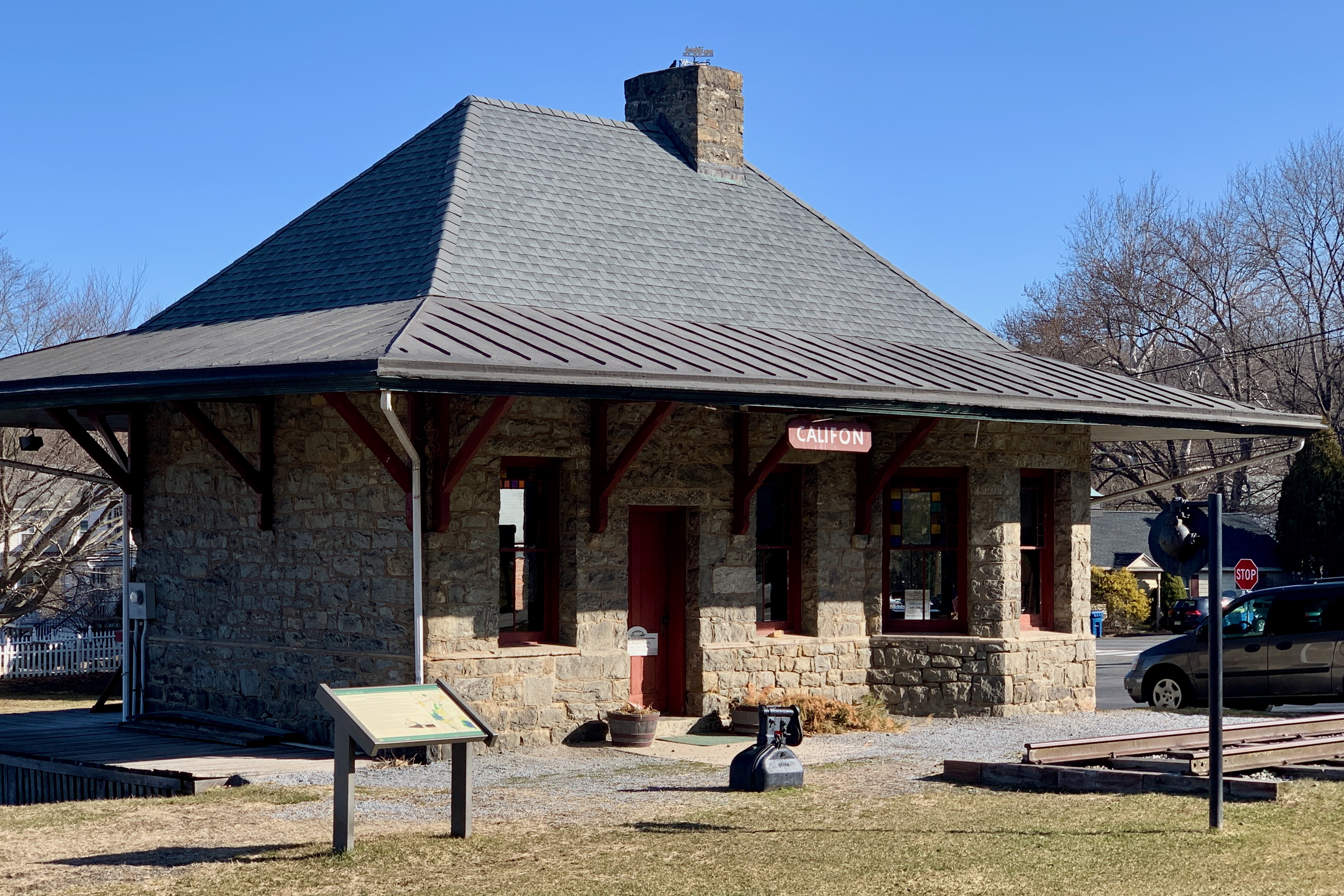
Califon Station

Califon was a station on the High Bridge Branch of the Central Railroad of New Jersey. The station was built in 1875 and is now used as a museum by the Califon Historical Society. The rail line was abandoned in 1976 and now serves as a Hunterdon County-administered rail trail called Columbia Trail, which runs south to High Bridge and north to points in Morris County.

Though the mills were present in the area of Califon for some time prior to its incorporation as a town, it was quite a while before growth became evident in the mid-nineteenth century. The J. K. Apgar Farmhouse, listed on the National Register of Historic Places, exemplifies the early stone farmhouses constructed in the region in the late eighteenth and early nineteenth century. The area that would become Califon was first called California, from Jacob Neighbor's enthusiasm in the milling business about the time the California Gold Rush broke out. The borough was incorporated by an act of the New Jersey Legislature from portions of both Lebanon and Tewksbury Townships on April 2, 1918.

Local legend has it that California became a regular stop for weekend excursion trains through the countryside. When riders bought their tickets they were issued a voucher good for an ice cream; the train would stop so tourists could wander around and cash in their ice cream coupons. Anxious to exploit this source of outside revenue, residents petitioned the railroad to let them build a real station, which they did as a community project. Citing the local account again, two sign painters who came to letter the sign rode the train from Dunellen, but the background paint wasn't dry when they arrived. They sat and drank at the hotel, which later burned down. By the time the sign was ready for their artistic touch, the local tale says, "Califon" was as close to California as the inebriated painters could manage.

Califon is located just north of the Ken Lockwood Gorge on the South Branch of the Raritan River. This stretch of clear water is regularly restocked by the state fisheries service .

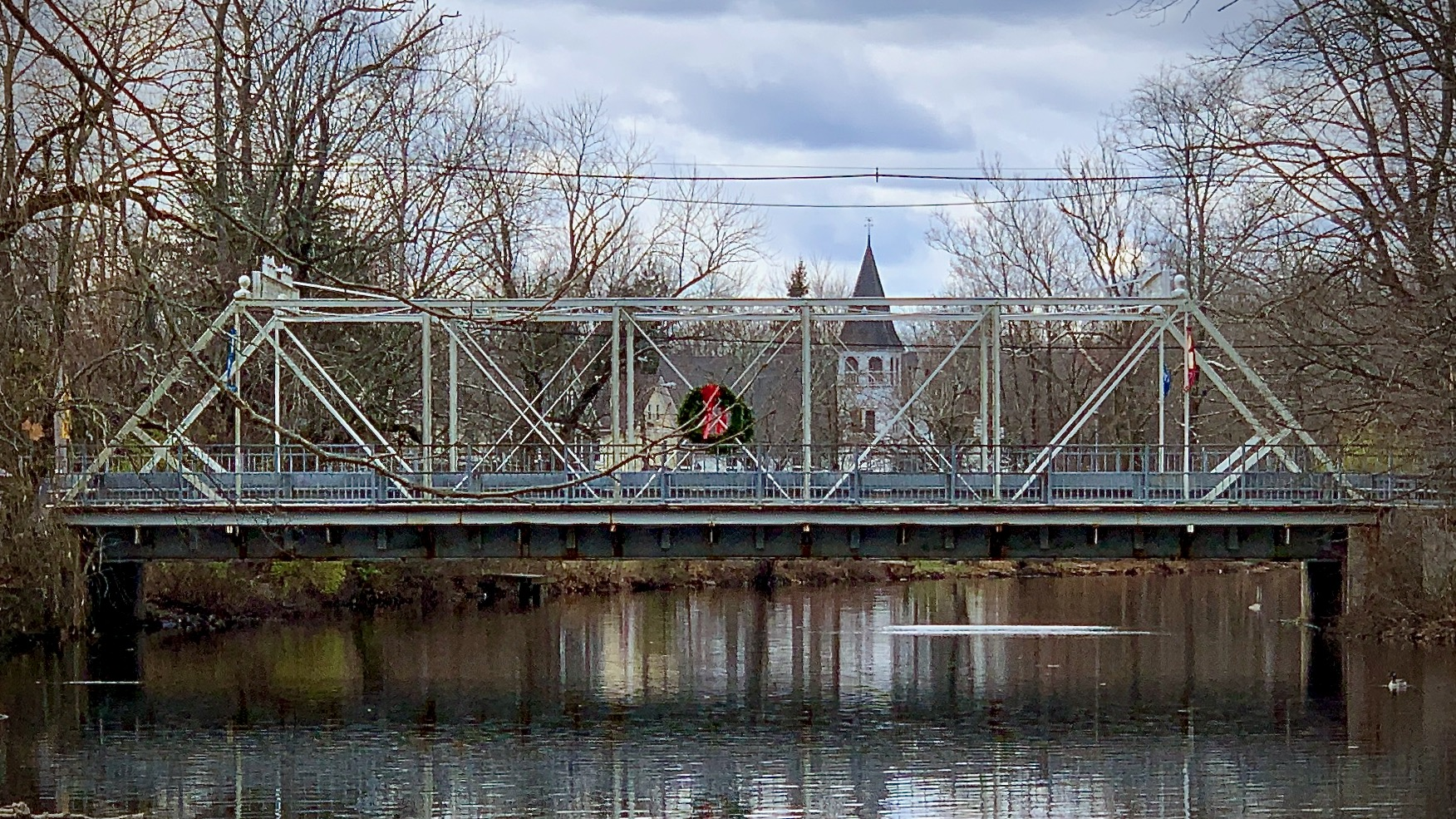
Califon Main Street Bridge

The center of Califon is the historic iron bridge spanning the South Branch of the Raritan River, which divides the borough. Recently the State of New Jersey announced that the bridge would be replaced because a loaded school bus represented more weight than the aging bridge could safely carry. Incensed citizens objected, protective of the landmark, and found a colorful but simple solution; the school bus stops at one end of the bridge unloading the students, who then walk across to the other side. Then the empty bus, within imposed weight limits, drives across and the students get back on the bus to continue their ride. Thus the bridge was saved. (Account featured on Califon website).

The 1943 short story, "The Greatest Gift," was set in a town inspired by Califon and adapted into the 1946 classic film It's a Wonderful Life. Author Philip Van Doren Stern said in a 1946 interview, "Incidentally, the movie takes place in Westchester County. Actually, the town I had in mind was Califon, N.J." The historic iron bridge in Califon is similar to the bridge that George Bailey considered jumping from in the movie.

Califon became a regional household name when frequently mentioned by Merv Griffin on his TV show during the 1970s. He and his wife Juliette owned a home in nearby Lebanon Township, which had a Califon mailing address, and, while they were married, they were often seen visiting the village in a fringed-top Bermuda-style resort cart, though they lived over 2 miles away. Califon Productions created all of his television ventures.

Hoffman's Crossing was named for Issac Hoffman, who farmed land that lies just south of Califon Bridge, along present day County Route 513.

== Historic district ==
- Califon Historic District
- U.S. National Register of Historic Places
- U.S. Historic district
- New Jersey Register of Historic Places
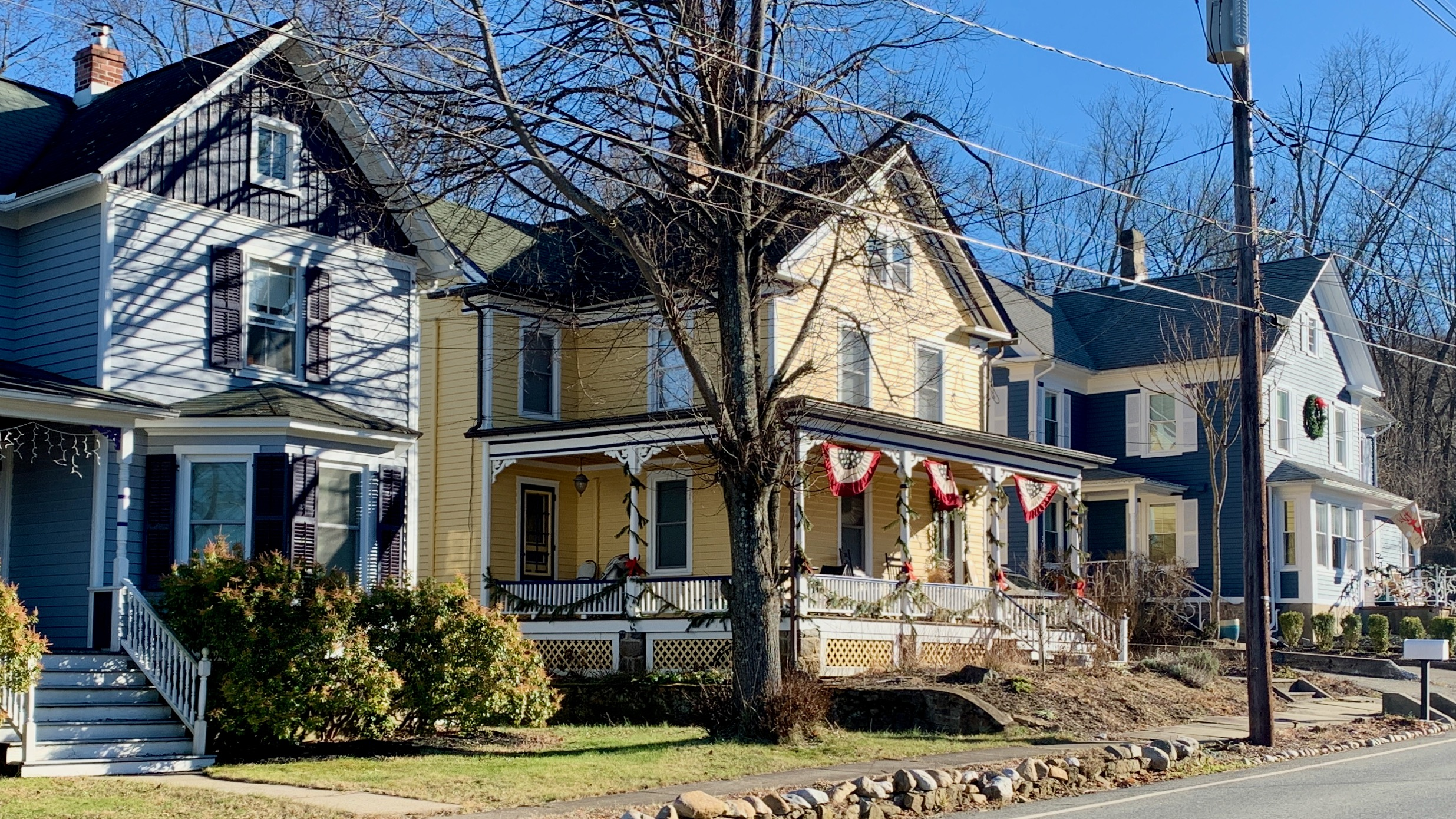
- Victorian houses on Academy Street
- Location: Main, Academy, Mill, Bank and First streets; Railroad and Philhower avenues; and River Road
- Area: 164 acres (66 ha)
- Architectural style: Late 19th and 20th Century Revivals, Late Victorian, Mid 19th Century
- NRHP reference No.: 76001157
- NJRHP No.: 1565

Significant dates
- Added to NRHP: October 14, 1976
- Designated NJRHP: May 8, 1975

The Califon Historic District is a 164-acre (66 ha) historic district encompassing much of the borough. It was added to the National Register of Historic Places on October 14, 1976, for its significance in commerce. The district includes 154 contributing buildings, three contributing structures, and one contributing site. It was created through the efforts of the Califon Historical Society. Califon is a Victorian-style enclave where the houses are marked with the names of the builders and their dates of establishment rather than with street numbers.

The Joseph Tiger House was built of stone in 1846. A stone raceway runs under the former Beatty's Store, indicating a possible mill site. The mid-19th century house at 1 First Street features a gable roof with an intersecting dormer. The Califon Main Street Bridge is a Pratt thru truss design built in 1887 by I. P. Bartley & Co. of Morris County.

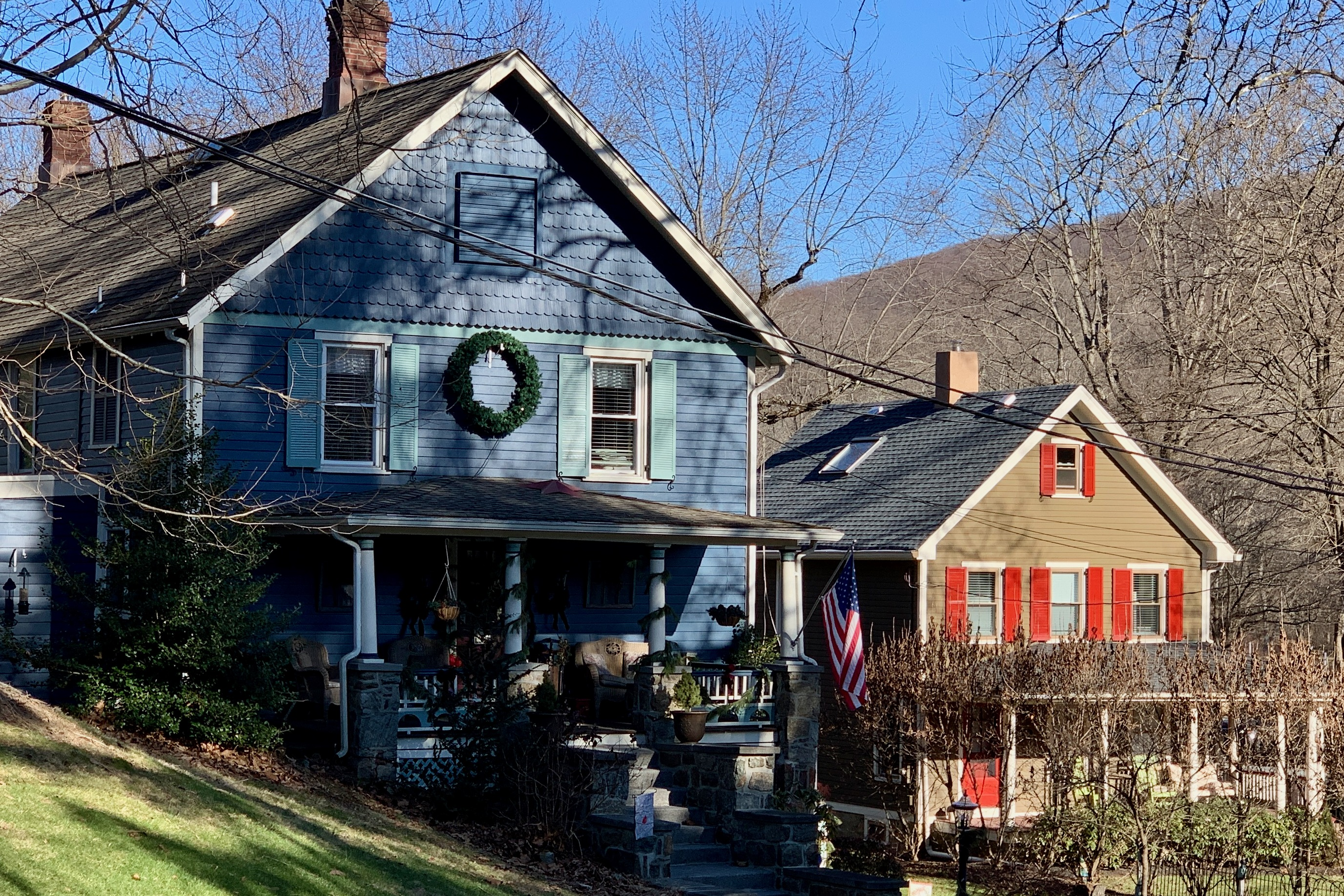
Victorian houses on Main Street

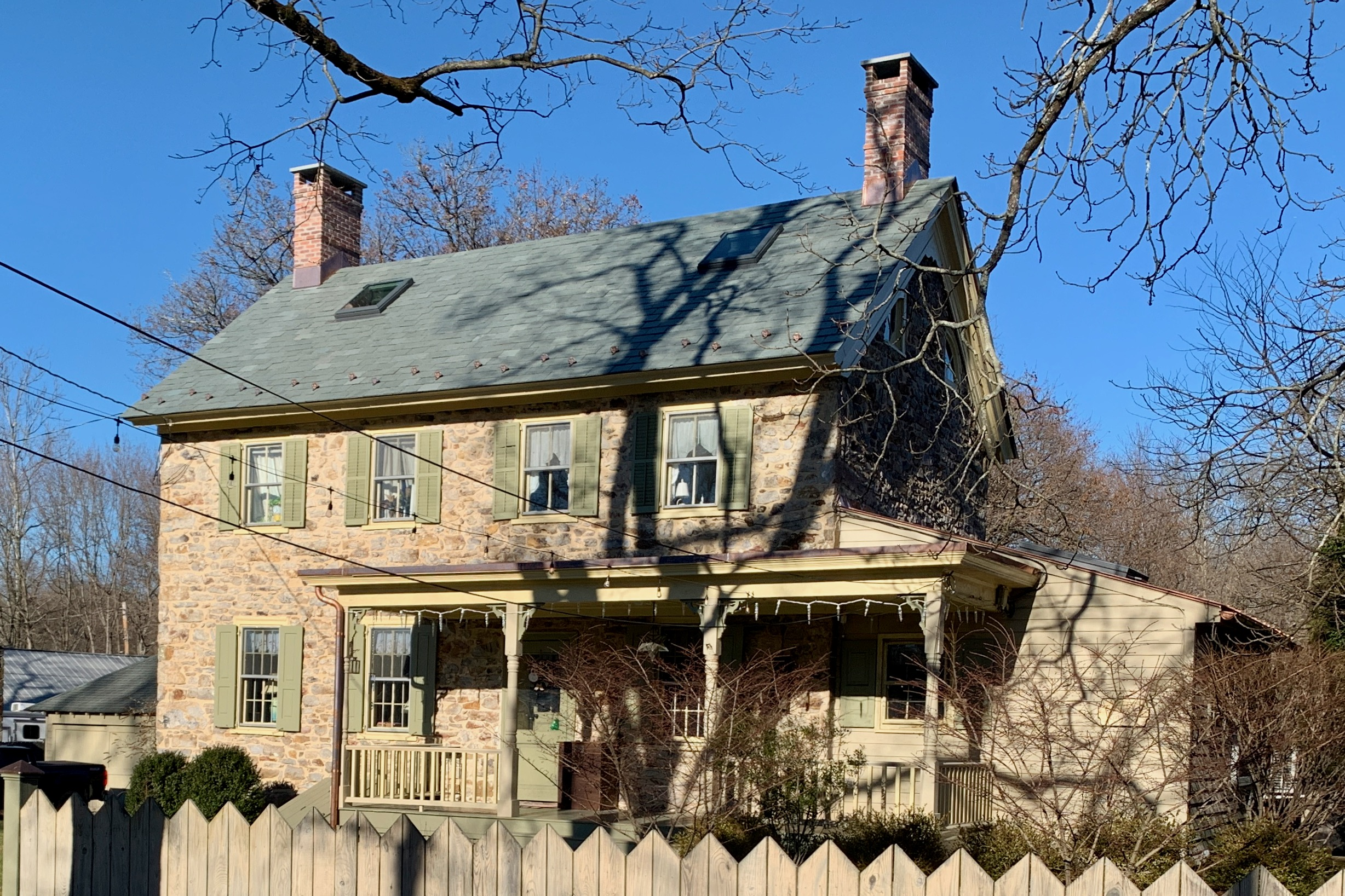
Joseph Tiger House on Mill Street

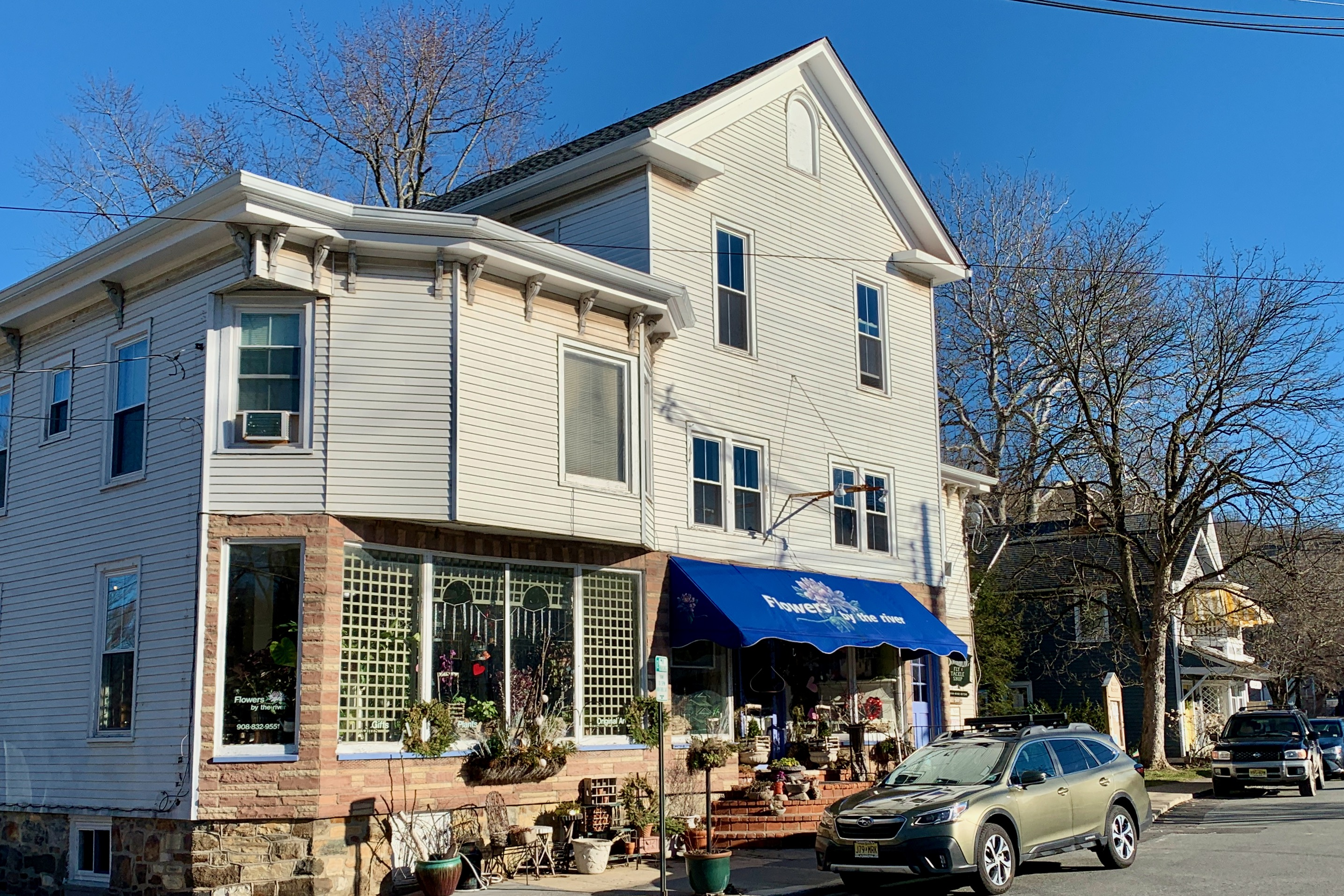
Former Beatty's Store on Main Street

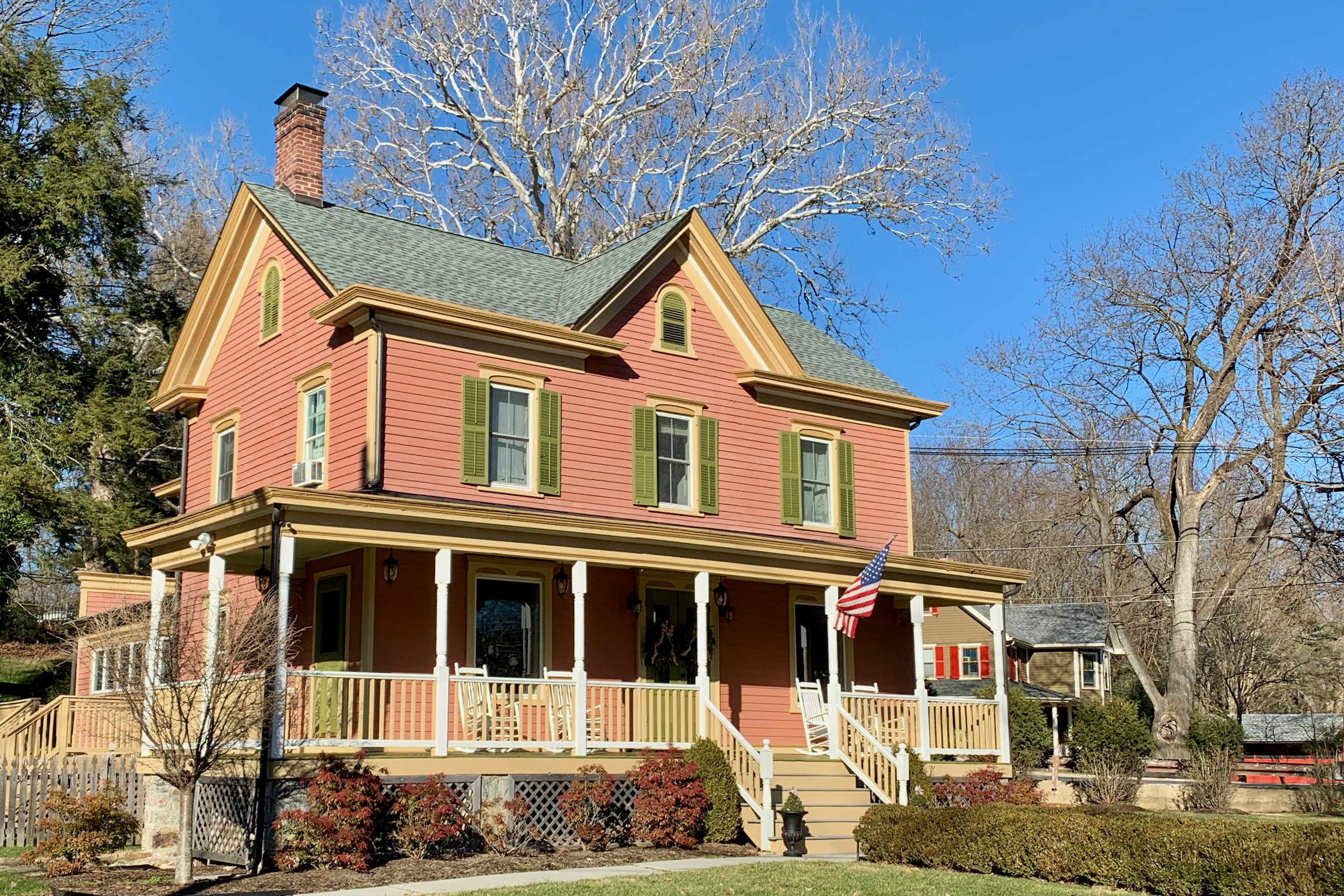
1 First Street

== Geography ==
According to the United States Census Bureau, the borough had a total area of 0.98 square miles (2.54 km^{2}), including 0.96 square miles (2.48 km^{2}) of land and 0.02 square miles (0.05 km^{2}) of water (2.04%).

Califon borders the Hunterdon County municipalities of Lebanon Township and Tewksbury Township.

Lower Valley is an unincorporated community located along the border of Califon and Lebanon Township.

== Demographics ==
Historical population
Census	Pop.	Note	%±
1920	513		—
1930	534		4.1%
1940	572		7.1%
1950	623		8.9%
1960	777		24.7%
1970	970		24.8%
1980	1,023		5.5%
1990	1,073		4.9%
2000	1,055		−1.7%
2010	1,076		2.0%
2020	1,005		−6.6%
2023 (est.)	1,013	▲	0.8%
Population sources: 1920; 1920–1930 1940–2000; 2000 2010 2020

=== 2010 census ===
The 2010 United States census counted 1,076 people, 394 households, and 309 families in the borough. The population density was 1,133.3 per square mile (437.6/km^{2}). There were 419 housing units at an average density of 441.3 per square mile (170.4/km^{2}). The racial makeup was 96.10% (1,034) White, 0.28% (3) Black or African American, 0.09% (1) Native American, 0.84% (9) Asian, 0.00% (0) Pacific Islander, 0.09% (1) from other races, and 2.60% (28) from two or more races. Hispanic or Latino of any race were 1.30% (14) of the population.

Of the 394 households, 40.1% had children under the age of 18; 67.8% were married couples living together; 7.6% had a female householder with no husband present and 21.6% were non-families. Of all households, 17.8% were made up of individuals and 5.6% had someone living alone who was 65 years of age or older. The average household size was 2.73 and the average family size was 3.14.

28.2% of the population were under the age of 18, 4.8% from 18 to 24, 22.6% from 25 to 44, 34.9% from 45 to 64, and 9.6% who were 65 years of age or older. The median age was 41.9 years. For every 100 females, the population had 93.5 males. For every 100 females ages 18 and older there were 88.5 males.

The Census Bureau's 2006–2010 American Community Survey showed that (in 2010 inflation-adjusted dollars) median household income was $108,375 (with a margin of error of +/− $9,026) and the median family income was $110,365 (+/− $5,782). Males had a median income of $95,536 (+/− $13,555) versus $73,958 (+/− $14,845) for females. The per capita income for the borough was $42,975 (+/− $5,250). About 1.7% of families and 2.4% of the population were below the poverty line, including 0.8% of those under age 18 and none of those age 65 or over.

=== 2000 census ===
As of the 2000 United States census there were 1,055 people, 401 households, and 301 families residing in the borough. The population density was 1,093.2 inhabitants per square mile (422.1/km^{2}). There were 410 housing units at an average density of 424.9 per square mile (164.1/km^{2}). The racial makeup of the borough was 98.67% White, 0.76% Asian, and 0.57% from two or more races. Hispanic or Latino of any race were 0.47% of the population.

There were 401 households, out of which 36.7% had children under the age of 18 living with them, 68.8% were married couples living together, 4.5% had a female householder with no husband present, and 24.7% were non-families. 21.2% of all households were made up of individuals, and 8.7% had someone living alone who was 65 years of age or older. The average household size was 2.63 and the average family size was 3.11.

In the borough the population was spread out, with 26.8% under the age of 18, 4.1% from 18 to 24, 30.6% from 25 to 44, 27.9% from 45 to 64, and 10.6% who were 65 years of age or older. The median age was 39 years. For every 100 females, there were 91.5 males. For every 100 females age 18 and over, there were 90.1 males.

The median income for a household in the borough was $76,657, and the median income for a family was $85,963. Males had a median income of $59,167 versus $41,125 for females. The per capita income for the borough was $31,064. About 3.3% of families and 4.3% of the population were below the poverty line, including 2.5% of those under age 18 and 14.8% of those age 65 or over.

== Parks and recreation ==
Califon hosts part of a rail trail that was created out of the former Central Railroad of New Jersey High Bridge Branch. The trail is maintained by Hunterdon County Parks and Recreation and is called the Columbia Trail, which includes a scenic area known as the Ken Lockwood Gorge.

== Government ==
=== Local government ===
Califon is governed under the borough form of New Jersey municipal government, which is used in 218 municipalities (of the 564) statewide, making it the most common form of government in New Jersey. The governing body is comprised of a mayor and a borough council, with all positions elected at-large on a partisan basis as part of the November general election. A mayor is elected directly by the voters to a four-year term of office. The borough council includes six members elected to serve three-year terms on a staggered basis, with two seats coming up for election each year in a three-year cycle. The borough form of government used by Califon is a "weak mayor / strong council" government in which council members act as the legislative body with the mayor presiding at meetings and voting only in the event of a tie. The mayor can veto ordinances subject to an override by a two-thirds majority vote of the council. The mayor makes committee and liaison assignments for council members, and most appointments are made by the mayor with the advice and consent of the council.

As of 2023, the mayor of Califon Borough is Democrat Charles Daniel, whose term of office ends December 31, 2026. Members of the Califon Borough Council are Council President Michael P. Medea (D, 2024), Richard Baggstrom (R, 2023), Ed Haversang (R, 2023), Leo M. Janas (D, 2024), Jason Ruggiero (R, 2025) and Cathy Smith (D, 2025).

Police coverage in the borough is provided by the Washington Township (Morris County) Police Department under the terms of a shared services agreement between the two municipalities.

=== Federal, state and county representation ===
Califon is located in the 7th Congressional District and is part of New Jersey's 23rd state legislative district.

For the 119th United States Congress, New Jersey's 7th congressional district is represented by Thomas Kean Jr. (R, Westfield). New Jersey is represented in the United States Senate by Democrats Cory Booker (Newark, term ends 2027) and Andy Kim (Moorestown, term ends 2031).

For the 2026–2027 session, the 23rd legislative district of the New Jersey Legislature is represented in the State Senate by Doug Steinhardt (R, Lopatcong Township) and in the General Assembly by John DiMaio (R, Hackettstown) and Erik Peterson (R, Franklin Township).

Hunterdon County is governed by a Board of County Commissioners comprised of five members who are elected at-large on a partisan basis to serve three-year terms of office on a staggered basis, with either one or two seats up for election each year as part of the November general election. At an annual reorganization meeting held each January, the commissioners select one member to serve as the board's Director and another to serve as Deputy Director, each for a one-year term. As of 2025, Hunterdon County's Commissioners are Director John E. Lanza (R; Raritan Township, 2025), Deputy Director Shaun C. Van Doren (R; Tewksbury Township, 2026), Jeff Kuhl (R; Raritan Township, 2027), Zachary T. Rich (R; West Amwell Township, 2025) and Susan Soloway (R; Franklin Township, 2027).

Constitutional officers elected on a countywide basis are Clerk Mary H. Melfi (R; Flemington, 2026), Sheriff Fredrick W. Brown (R; Alexandria Township, 2025) and Surrogate Heidi Rohrbach (R; Lebanon Township, 2028).

=== Politics ===
As of March 2011, there were a total of 723 registered voters in Califon, of which 214 (29.6%) were registered as Democrats, 252 (34.9%) were registered as Republicans and 257 (35.5%) were registered as Unaffiliated. There were no voters registered to other parties.

Gubernatorial election results for Califon
Year	Republican		Democratic		Third party(ies)	
Year	No.	%	No.	%	No.	%
2025	265	44.69%	326	54.97%	2	0.34%
2021	258	51.09%	240	47.52%	7	1.39%
2017	223	52.97%	192	45.61%	6	1.43%
2013	237	62.37%	134	35.26%	9	2.37%
2009	251	56.03%	138	30.80%	59	13.17%
2005	219	52.39%	165	39.47%	34	8.13%

In the 2012 presidential election, Democrat Barack Obama received 51.0% of the vote (290 cast), ahead of Republican Mitt Romney with 47.3% (269 votes), and other candidates with 1.8% (10 votes), among the 573 ballots cast by the borough's 773 registered voters (4 ballots were spoiled), for a turnout of 74.1%. In the 2008 presidential election, Democrat Barack Obama received 51.1% of the vote (324 cast), ahead of Republican John McCain with 46.4% (294 votes) and other candidates with 1.7% (11 votes), among the 634 ballots cast by the borough's 792 registered voters, for a turnout of 80.1%. In the 2004 presidential election, Republican George W. Bush received 51.2% of the vote (330 ballots cast), outpolling Democrat John Kerry with 47.2% (304 votes) and other candidates with 1.3% (10 votes), among the 644 ballots cast by the borough's 796 registered voters, for a turnout percentage of 80.9.

United States presidential election results for Califon
Year	Republican		Democratic		Third party(ies)	
Year	No.	%	No.	%	No.	%
2024	331	46.69%	370	52.19%	8	1.13%
2020	323	45.05%	378	52.72%	16	2.23%
2016	287	48.32%	270	45.45%	37	6.23%
2012	269	47.28%	290	50.97%	10	1.76%
2008	294	46.74%	324	51.51%	11	1.75%
2004	330	51.24%	304	47.20%	10	1.55%

In the 2013 gubernatorial election, Republican Chris Christie received 62.4% of the vote (237 cast), ahead of Democrat Barbara Buono with 35.3% (134 votes), and other candidates with 2.4% (9 votes), among the 383 ballots cast by the borough's 774 registered voters (3 ballots were spoiled), for a turnout of 49.5%. In the 2009 gubernatorial election, Republican Chris Christie received 55.4% of the vote (251 ballots cast), ahead of Democrat Jon Corzine with 30.5% (138 votes), Independent Chris Daggett with 12.1% (55 votes) and other candidates with 0.9% (4 votes), among the 453 ballots cast by the borough's 772 registered voters, yielding a 58.7% turnout.

United States Senate election results for Califon1
Year	Republican		Democratic		Third party(ies)	
Year	No.	%	No.	%	No.	%
2024	300	44.58%	360	53.49%	13	1.93%
2018	288	51.52%	247	44.19%	24	4.29%
2012	250	48.26%	243	46.91%	25	4.83%
2006	193	46.96%	203	49.39%	15	3.65%

United States Senate election results for Califon2
Year	Republican		Democratic		Third party(ies)	
Year	No.	%	No.	%	No.	%
2020	322	45.93%	359	51.21%	20	2.85%
2014	158	50.00%	150	47.47%	8	2.53%
2013	129	50.79%	119	46.85%	6	2.36%
2008	303	53.25%	241	42.36%	25	4.39%

== Education ==
The Califon School District serves students in public school for pre-kindergarten through eighth grade at Califon Public School. As of the 2021–22 school year, the district, comprised of one school, had an enrollment of 83 students and 14.9 classroom teachers (on an FTE basis), for a student–teacher ratio of 5.6:1. In the 2016–2017 school year, Califon had the seventh-smallest enrollment of any school district in the state.

Public school students in ninth through twelfth grades attend Voorhees High School, which also serves students from Glen Gardner, Hampton, High Bridge, Lebanon Township and Tewksbury Township. As of the 2021–22 school year, the high school had an enrollment of 780 students and 76.4 classroom teachers (on an FTE basis), for a student–teacher ratio of 10.2:1. The school is part of the North Hunterdon-Voorhees Regional High School District, which also includes students from Bethlehem Township, Clinton Town, Clinton Township, Franklin Township, Lebanon Borough and Union Township who attend North Hunterdon High School in Annandale.

Eighth grade students from all of Hunterdon County are eligible to apply to attend the high school programs offered by the Hunterdon County Vocational School District, a county-wide vocational school district that offers career and technical education at its campuses in Raritan Township and at programs sited at local high schools, with tuition covered by local taxes.

== Places of worship ==
The Califon United Methodist Church was founded in 1867, but the oldest part of the building was built in 1824 at Oldwick and moved here. The newer sanctuary facing River Road was built in 1891. The Lower Valley Presbyterian Church was built in 1871. Both are noted by the Califon Historical Society.

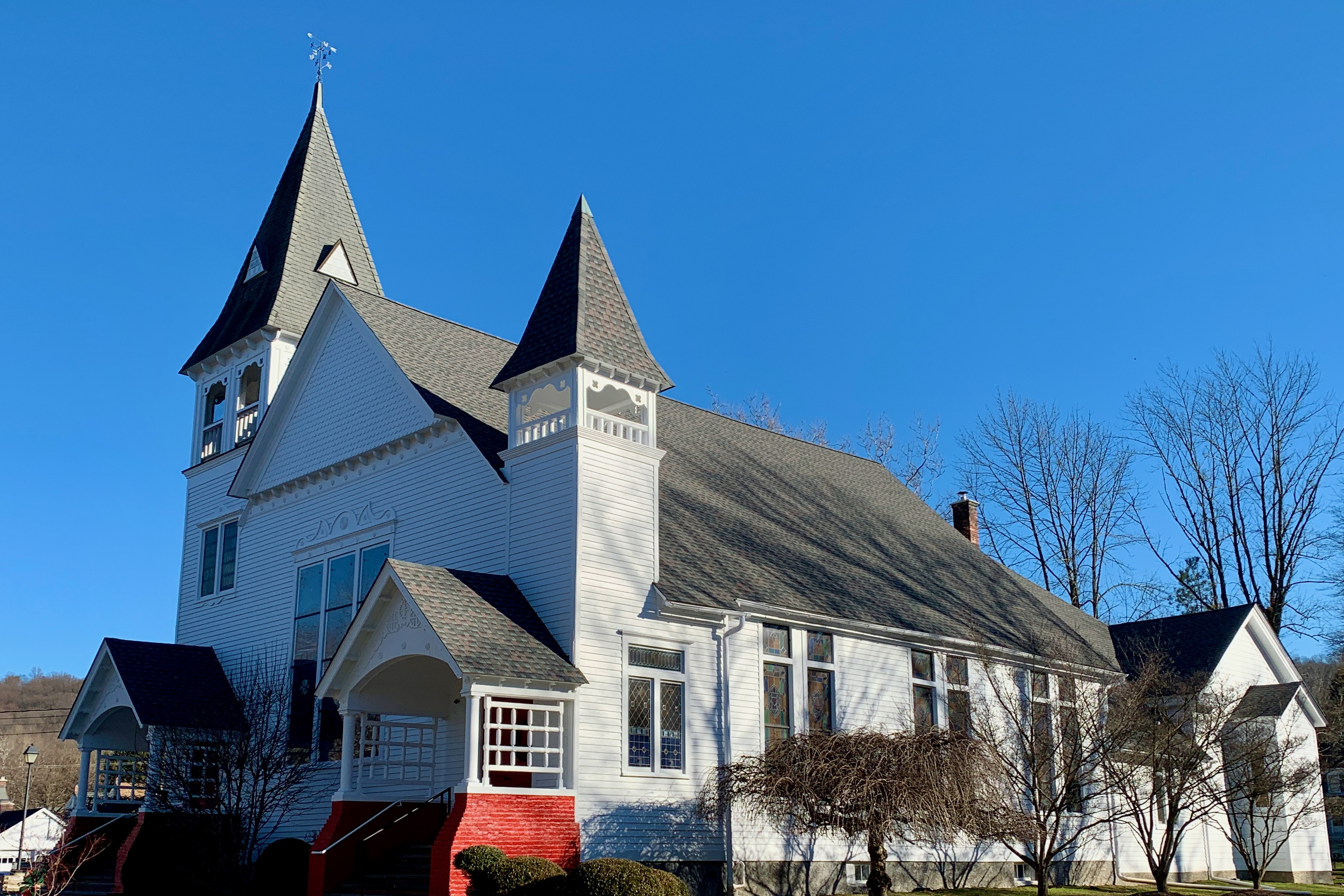
United Methodist Church on River Road

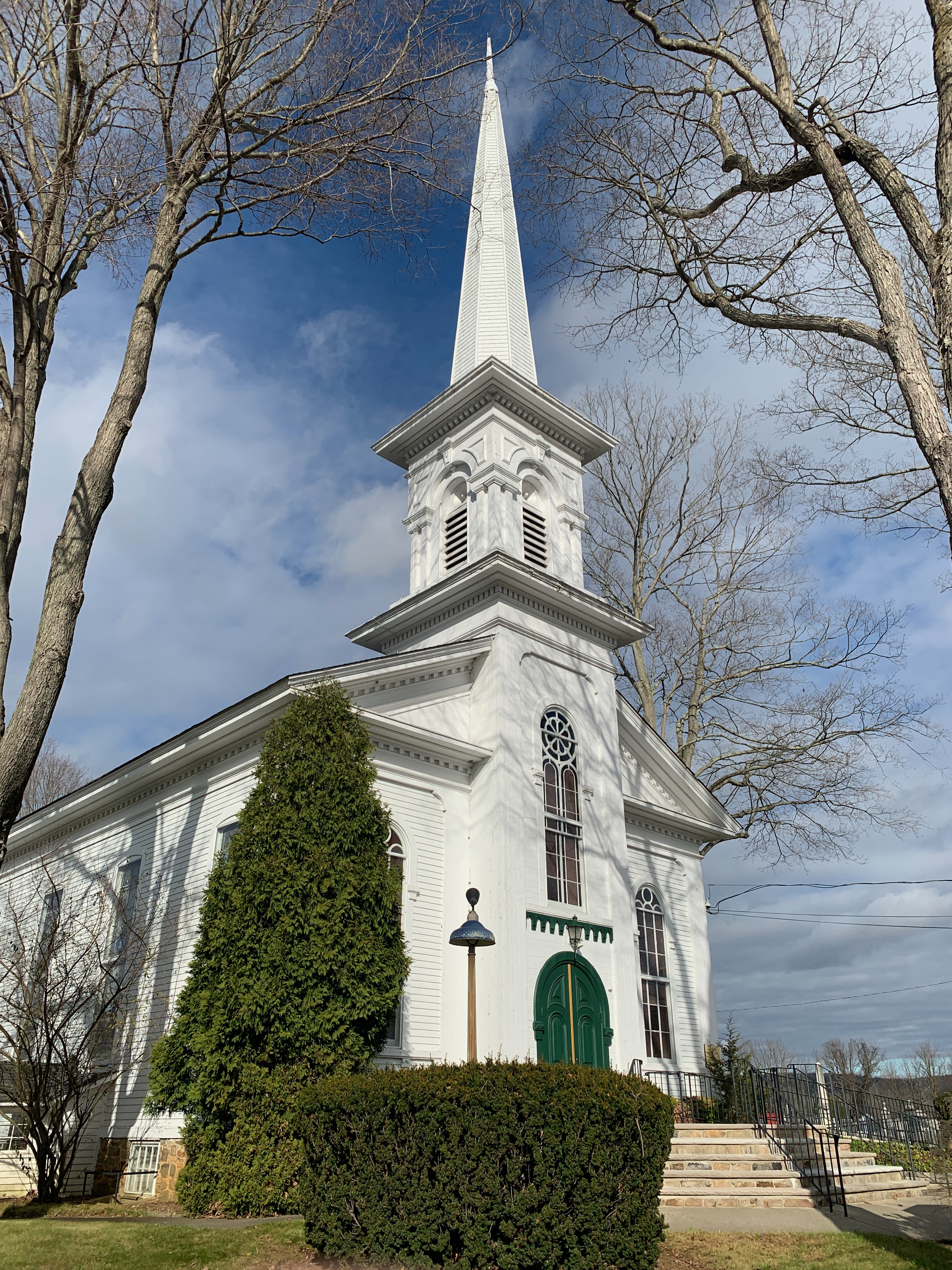
Lower Valley Presbyterian Church

== Transportation ==
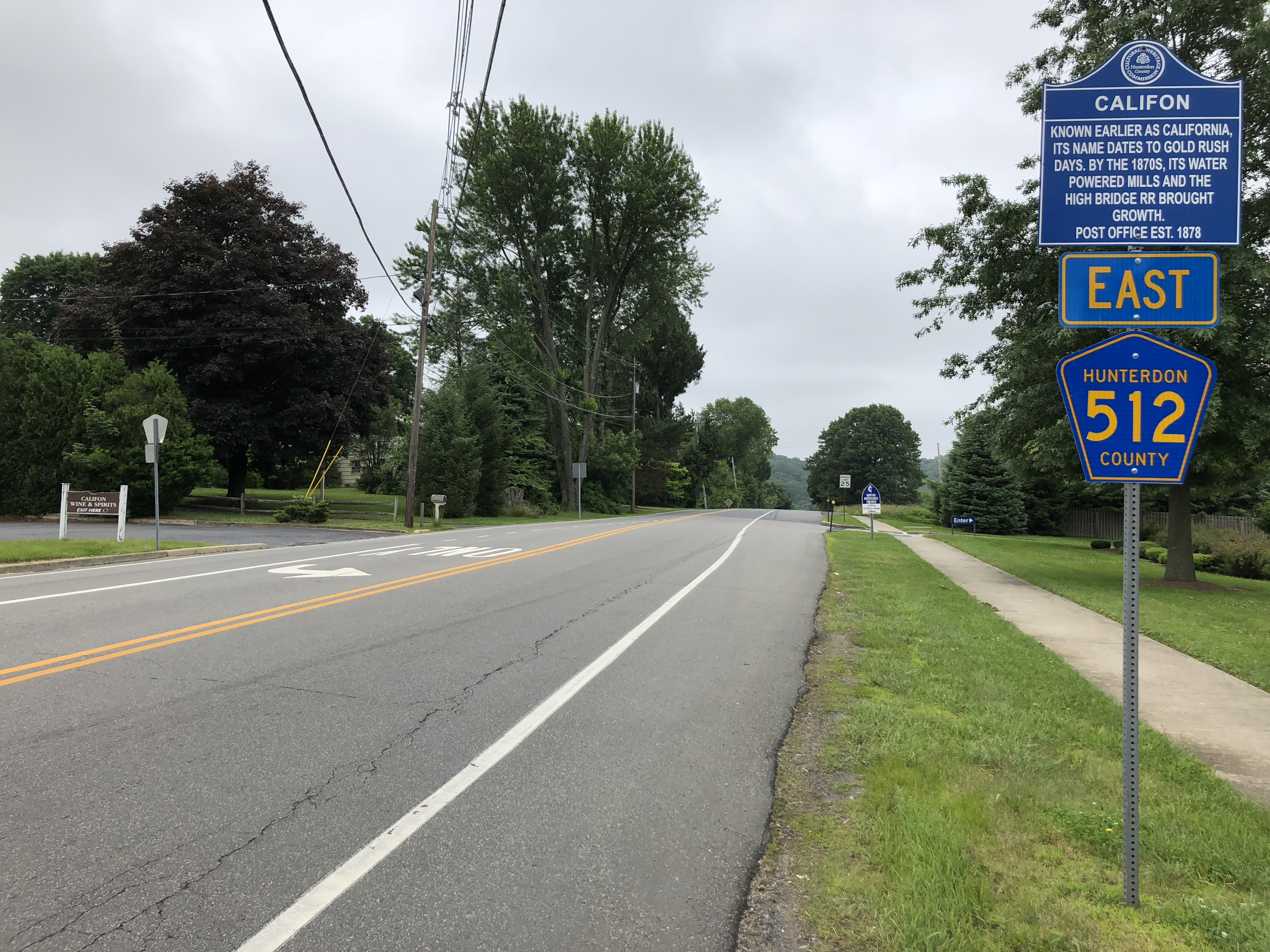
County Route 512 in Califon

As of May 2010, the borough had a total of 11.50 miles (18.51 km) of roadways, of which 9.50 miles (15.29 km) were maintained by the municipality and 2.00 miles (3.22 km) by Hunterdon County.

The most prominent roads passing through Califon are County Route 512 and 513.

== Notable people ==
People who were born in, residents of, or otherwise closely associated with Califon include:

- W. Carl Burger (1925–2023), abstract expressionist painter
- Thomas W. Greelish (1939–1991), United States Attorney for the District of New Jersey from 1985 to 1987. Greelish moved to Califon with his family when he was seven years old
- Merv Griffin (1925–2007), television producer, once owned a farm a few miles outside of Califon. When he created the game show Wheel of Fortune, he gave a nod to Califon when naming the show's production company. To this day, Califon Productions, Inc. is the copyright holder for all episodes of Wheel of Fortune to date, although the show is owned by Sony Pictures Television
- Asher Grodman (born 1987), actor and producer who stars in the CBS series Ghosts
- Francis Burton Harrison (1873–1957), member of the United States House of Representatives and Governor-General of the Philippines under Woodrow Wilson who retired to Califon a few months before his death in 1957
- Teddy Schneider (born 1988), soccer player for the New York Red Bulls
