= Ken Lockwood Gorge Bridge =

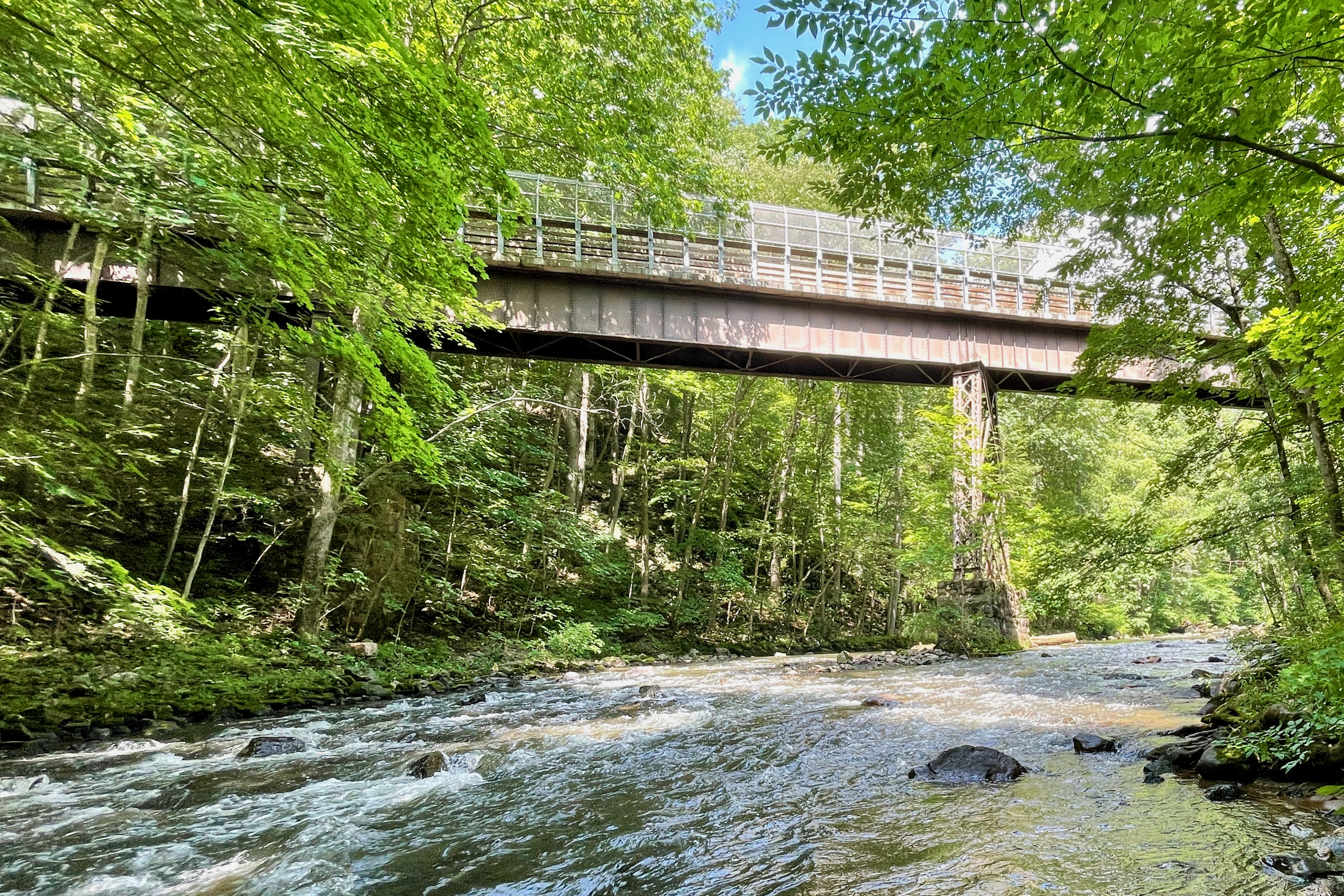
- View looking northwest
- Coordinates: 40°41′51.2″N 74°52′20.5″W
- Carries: Columbia Trail
- Crosses: South Branch Raritan River
- Locale: Ken Lockwood Gorge; Lebanon Township, New Jersey

Characteristics
- Total length: 250 feet (76 m)

History
- Opened: 1891

Location
- Interactive map of Ken Lockwood Gorge Bridge

The Ken Lockwood Gorge Bridge is a steel plate girder bridge built for the High Bridge Branch of the Central Railroad of New Jersey (CNJ) to cross the South Branch Raritan River in Ken Lockwood Gorge of Hunterdon County, New Jersey. It is now open for pedestrian traffic on the Columbia Trail, a rail trail that starts in High Bridge.

== History ==
The first bridge constructed here was a wooden Howe truss bridge. On April 18, 1885, an iron ore train drawn by a Baldwin locomotive (#112), named Columbia, fell into the river when the center and southern spans collapsed. Temporary repairs were then made to the bridge.

In 1891, the current 250-foot (76 m) long steel bridge was built to replace the previous wooden bridge. In 1931, it was strengthened to carry heavier loads. The last passenger service on the railroad was in 1935 and the last freight service in 1976.

== Gallery ==
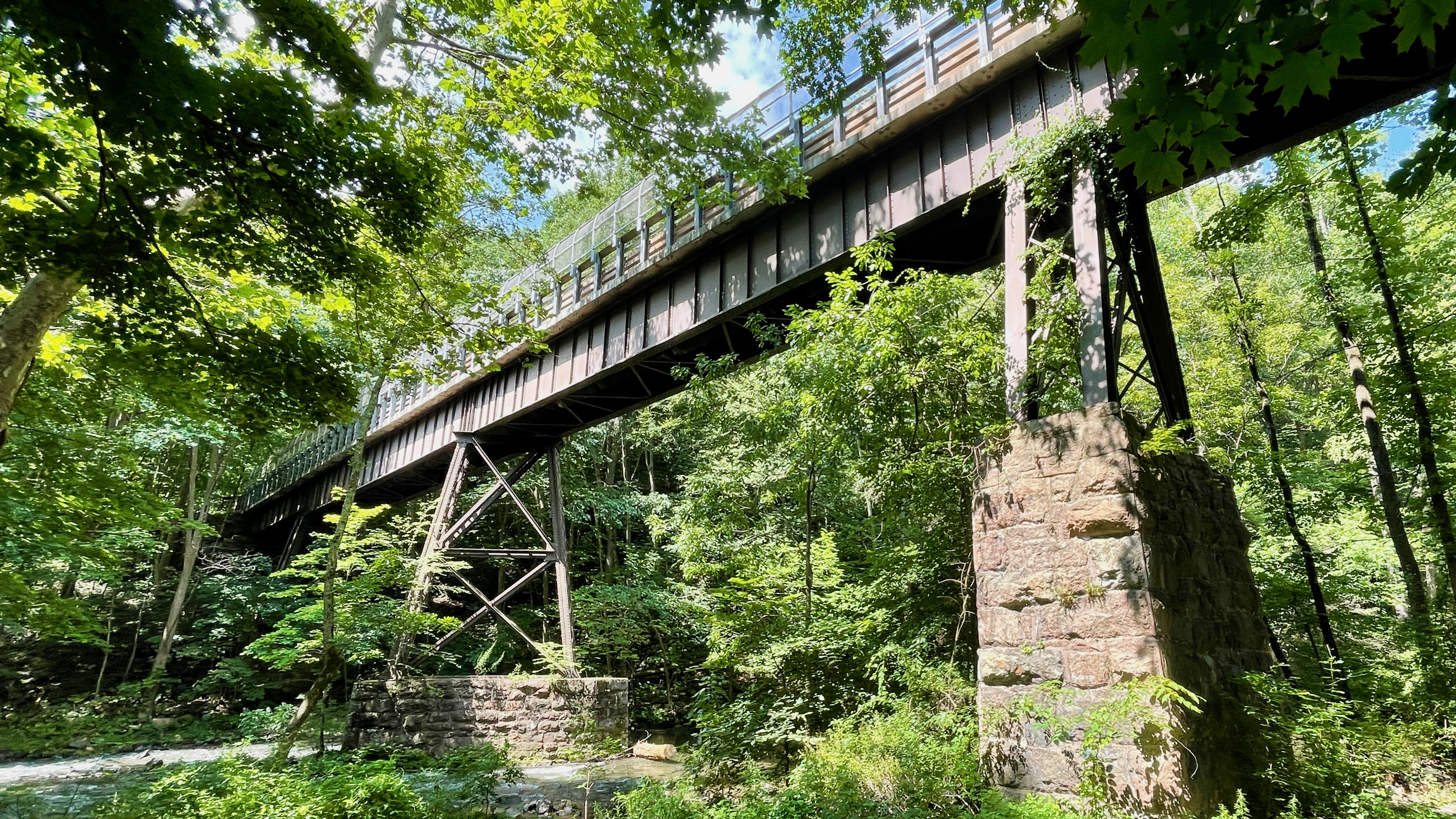
View looking west

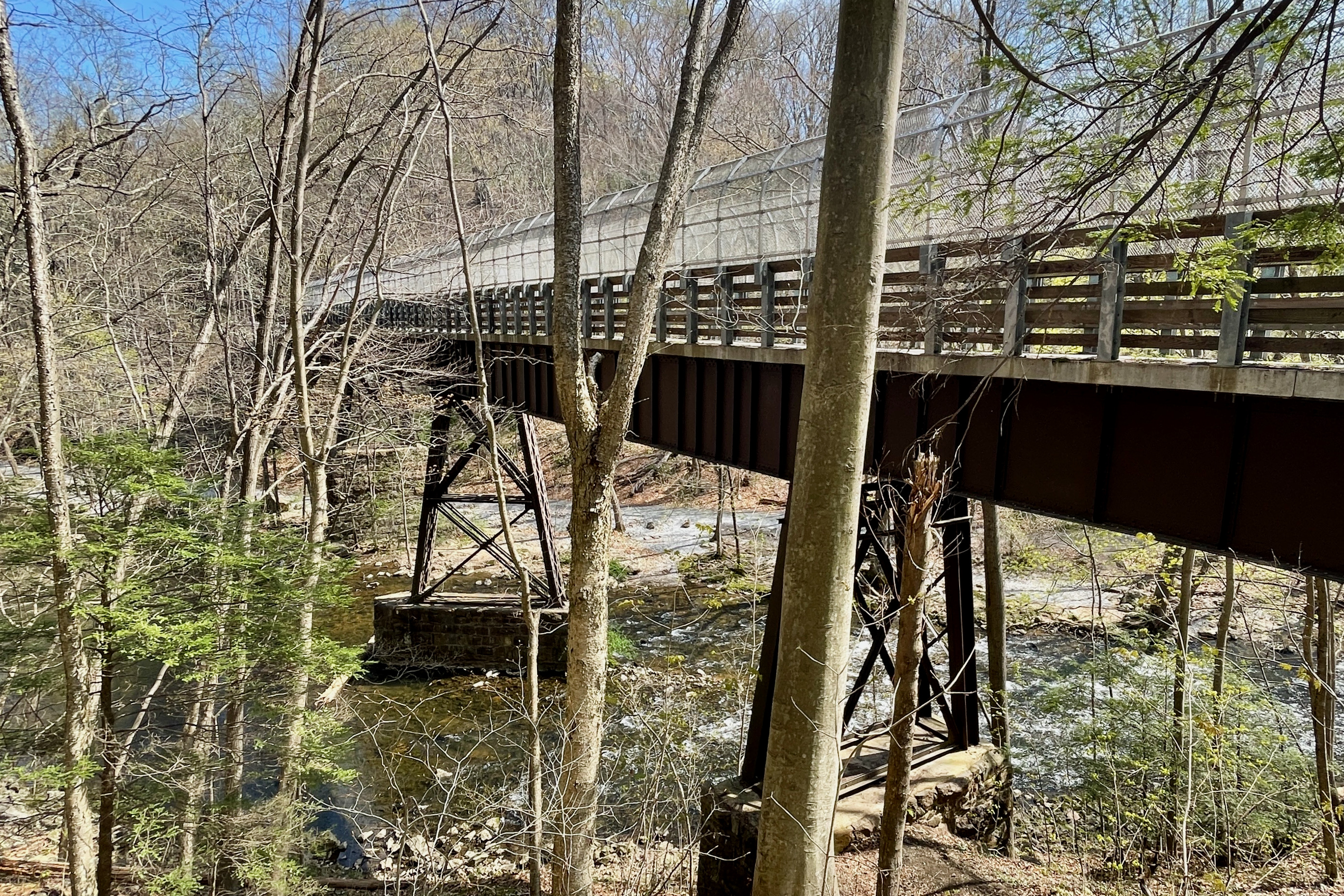
View looking northeast

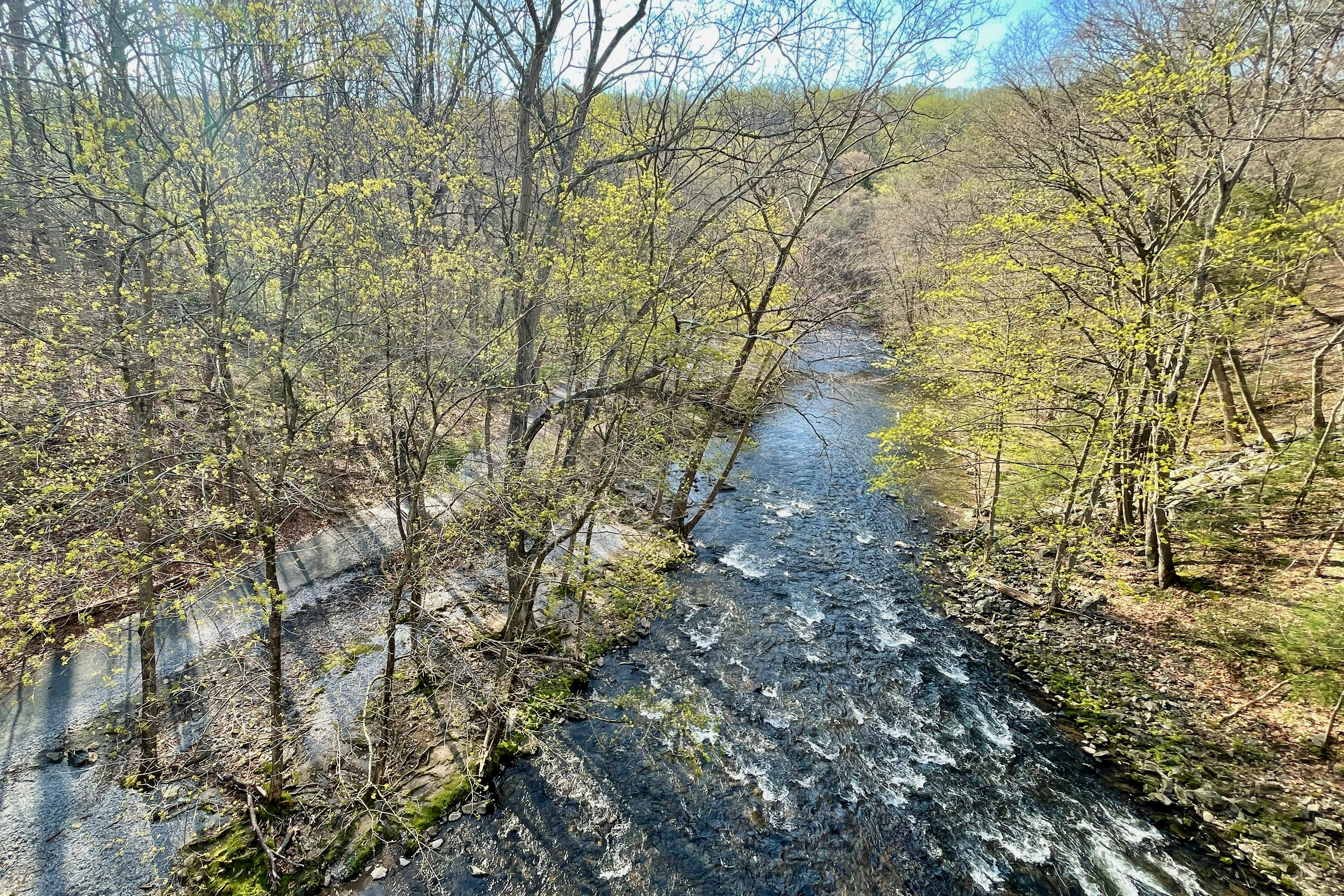
View from the bridge of the South Branch Raritan River gorge

== See also ==
- List of crossings of the Raritan River
