= South Branch Raritan River =

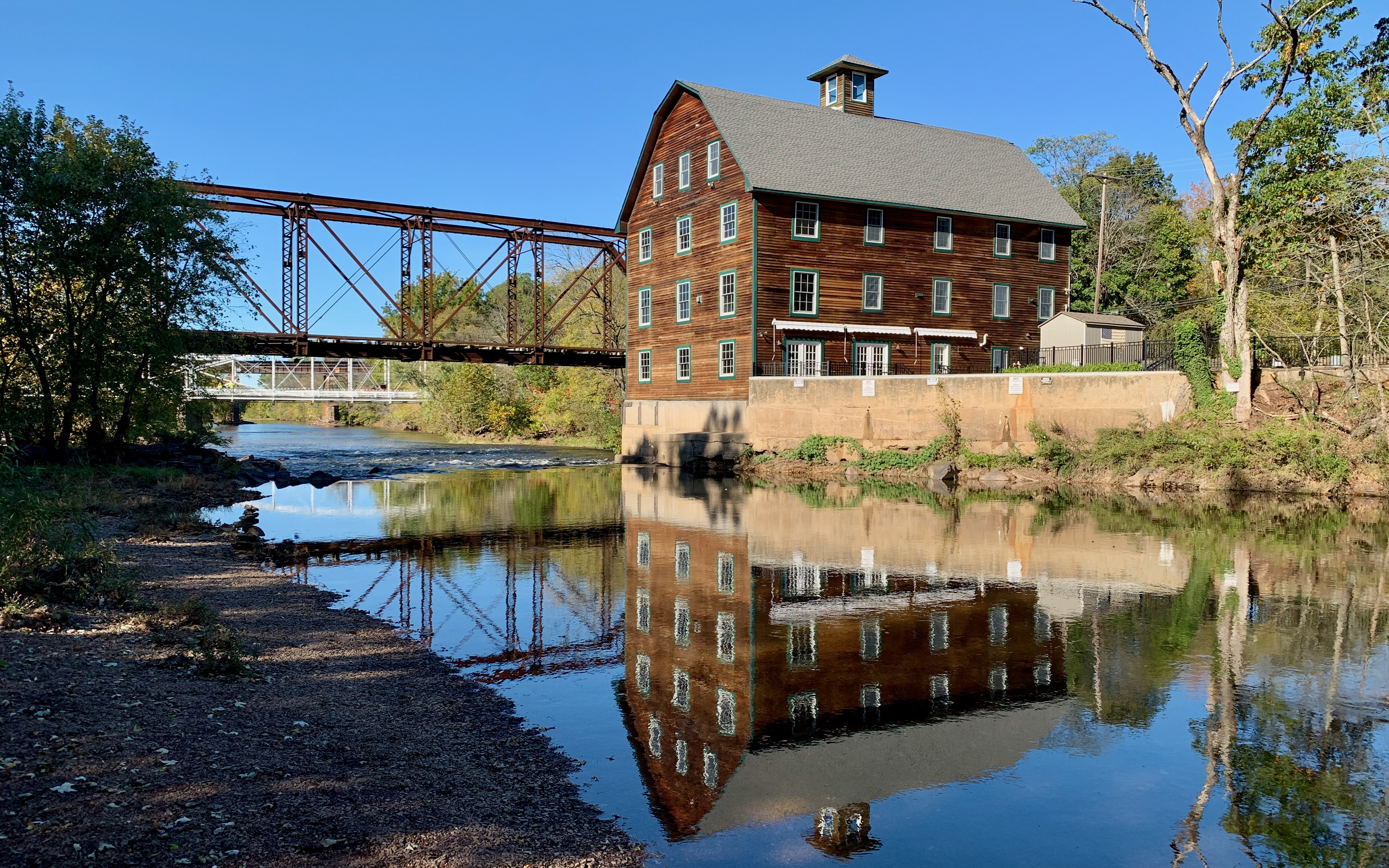
- South Branch Raritan River flowing past Neshanic Mills

Location
- Country: United States
- State: New Jersey
- Region: Hunterdon County; Morris County; Somerset County

Physical characteristics
- Source: Budd Lake
  - location: Budd Lake
  - coordinates: 40°51′48″N 74°45′07″W
- Mouth: Raritan River
  - location: Branchburg
  - coordinates: 40°33′19″N 74°41′15″W

Basin features
- River system: Raritan River

The South Branch Raritan River is a 50-mile-long (80 km) tributary of the Raritan River in New Jersey.

== Description ==
The source of the South Branch is the outflow from Budd Lake, a glacial remnant located a few miles northeast of Hackettstown. The river flows out of Morris County, down the middle of Hunterdon County, and along the western edge of Somerset County.

At its end, it forms the border between Branchburg and Hillsborough Townships and, upon reaching the border of Bridgewater Township, joins the North Branch Raritan River to form the Raritan River, which generally flows eastward from that point. This area where the branches converge was called "Tucca-Ramma-Hacking" by the Lenape meaning the flowing together of water. It was called "Two Bridges" by the early European settlers, after a set of bridges built in 1733 that met at a small island (the island has washed away over time) on the North Branch. Today the area is generally referred to as "The Confluence". In the 1970s, the state discussed plans for a Raritan Confluence Reservoir, which have been shelved due to acquisition costs.

The river’s local grassroots organization is the Raritan Headwaters Association. Their mission is to “protects water in our rivers, our streams, and our homes. Our vision is that everyone within our reach has access to safe, clean water that is swimmable, fishable, and above all, drinkable”. Established in 1959 as the South Branch Watershed Association, Raritan Headwaters is one of the oldest and largest watershed associations in New Jersey, covering 276 square miles, 3 counties and 25 municipalities. The group offers homeowner well testing, environmental education, river monitoring, annual river cleanup and stream restoration. Real-time streamflow and weather data for the South Branch Raritan River at High Bridge are available via online monitoring systems.

Both North and South branches of the Raritan run nearly parallel southwards, east and west of one another, but receive their names from the direction each one flows from at their confluence.

== Gallery ==
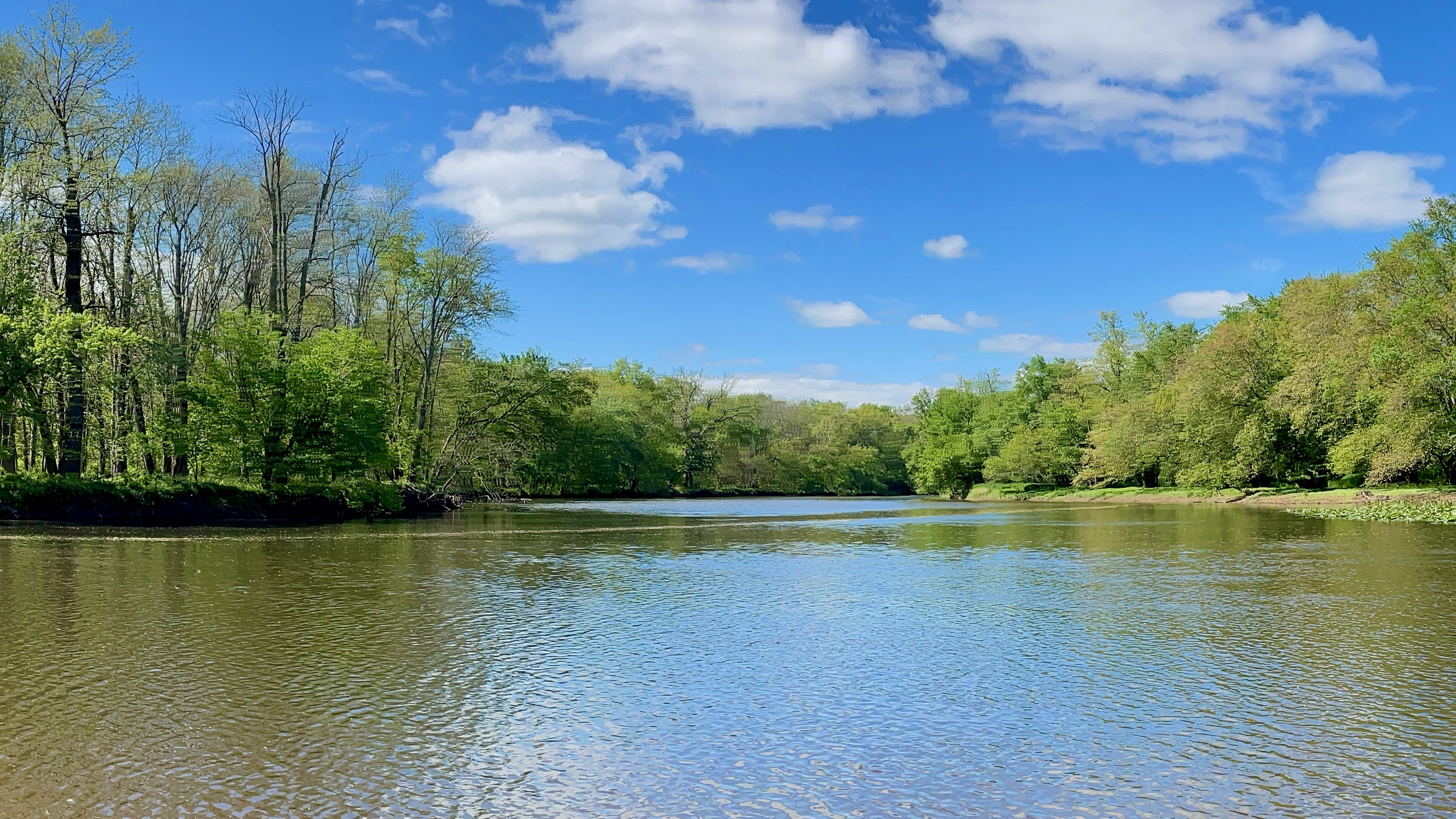
Confluence of the South Branch and the North Branch with the Raritan River
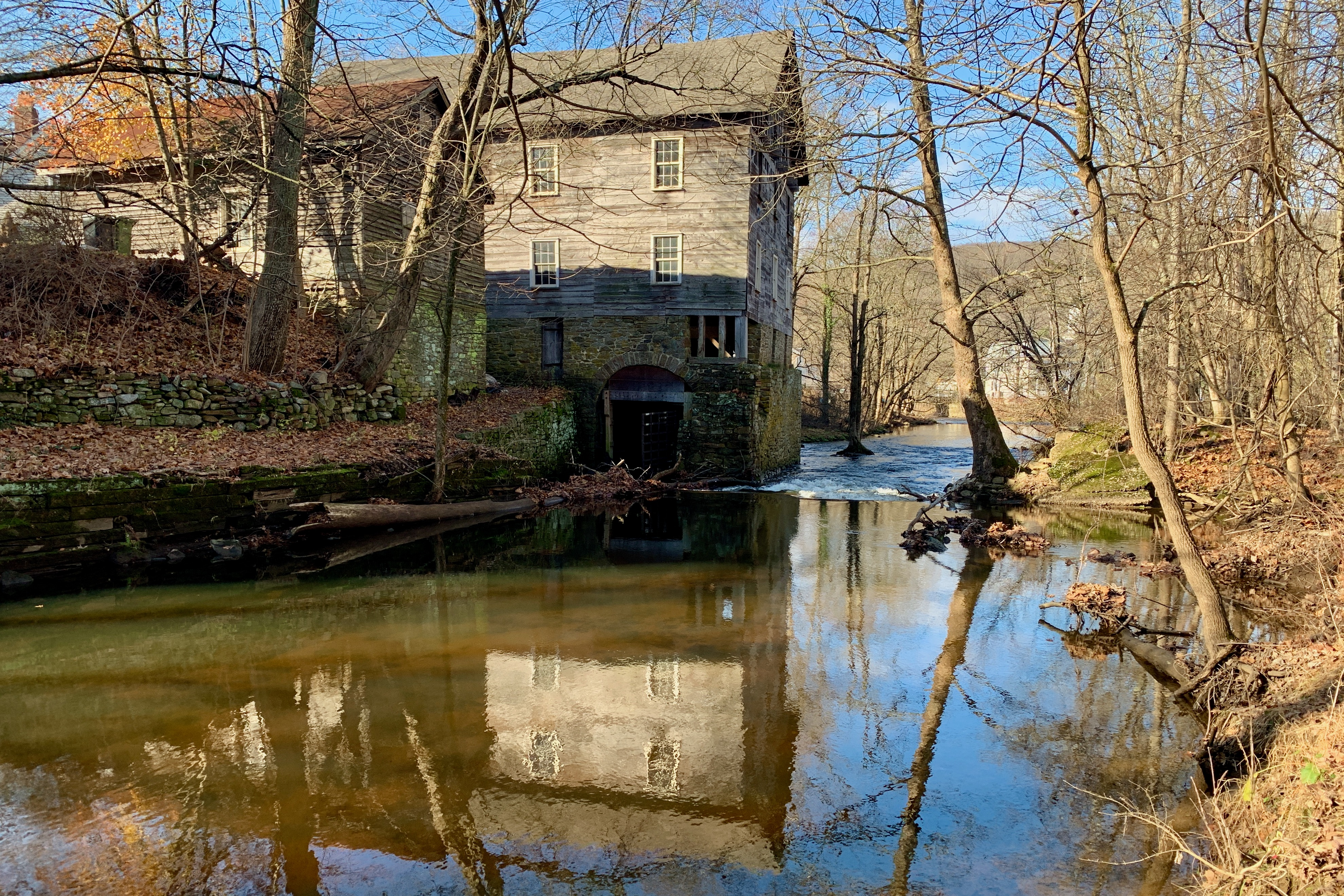
Flowing past the Obadiah Latourette Grist and Saw Mill in Long Valley

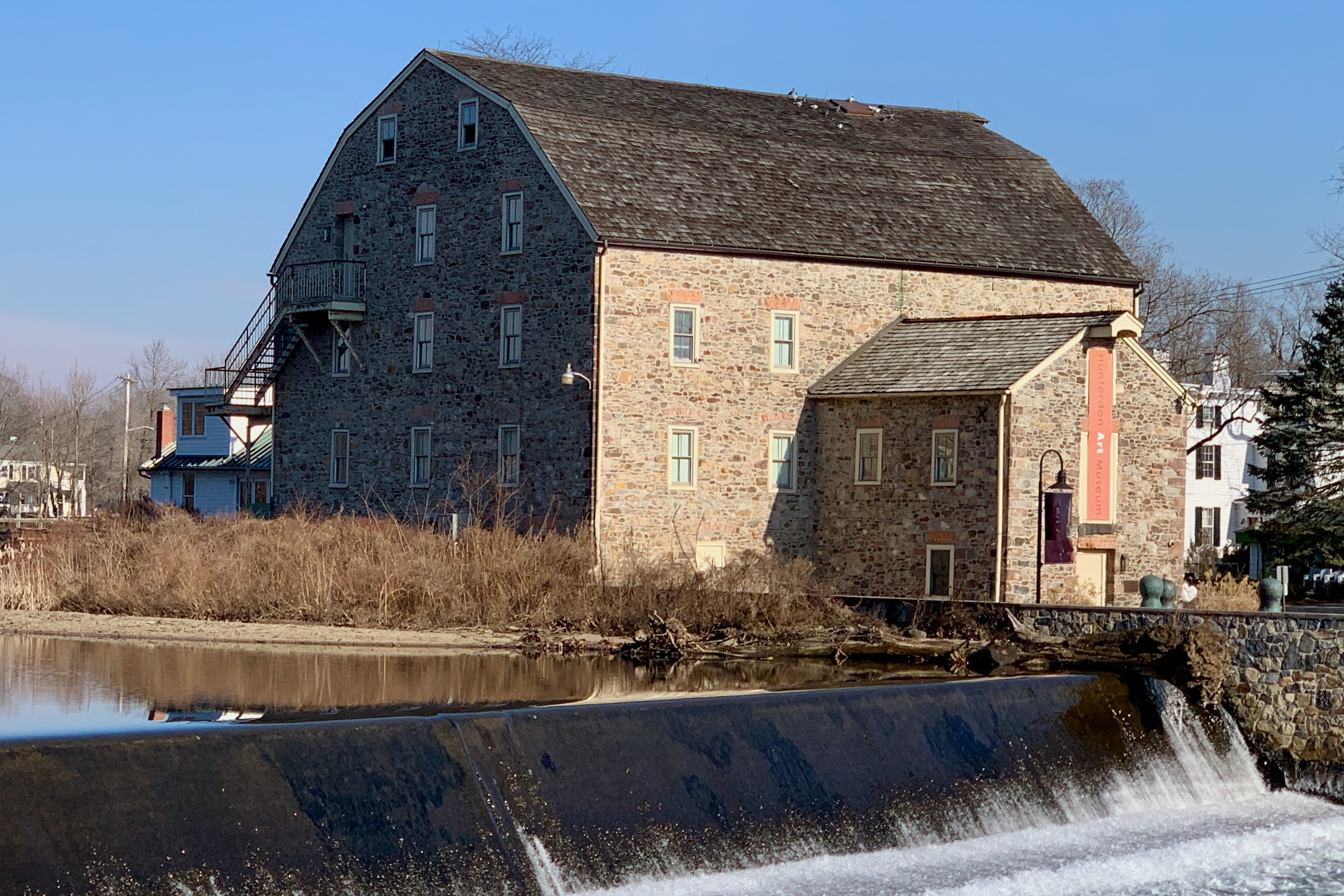
Dunham's Mill, home to the Hunterdon Art Museum, and the Clinton Dam

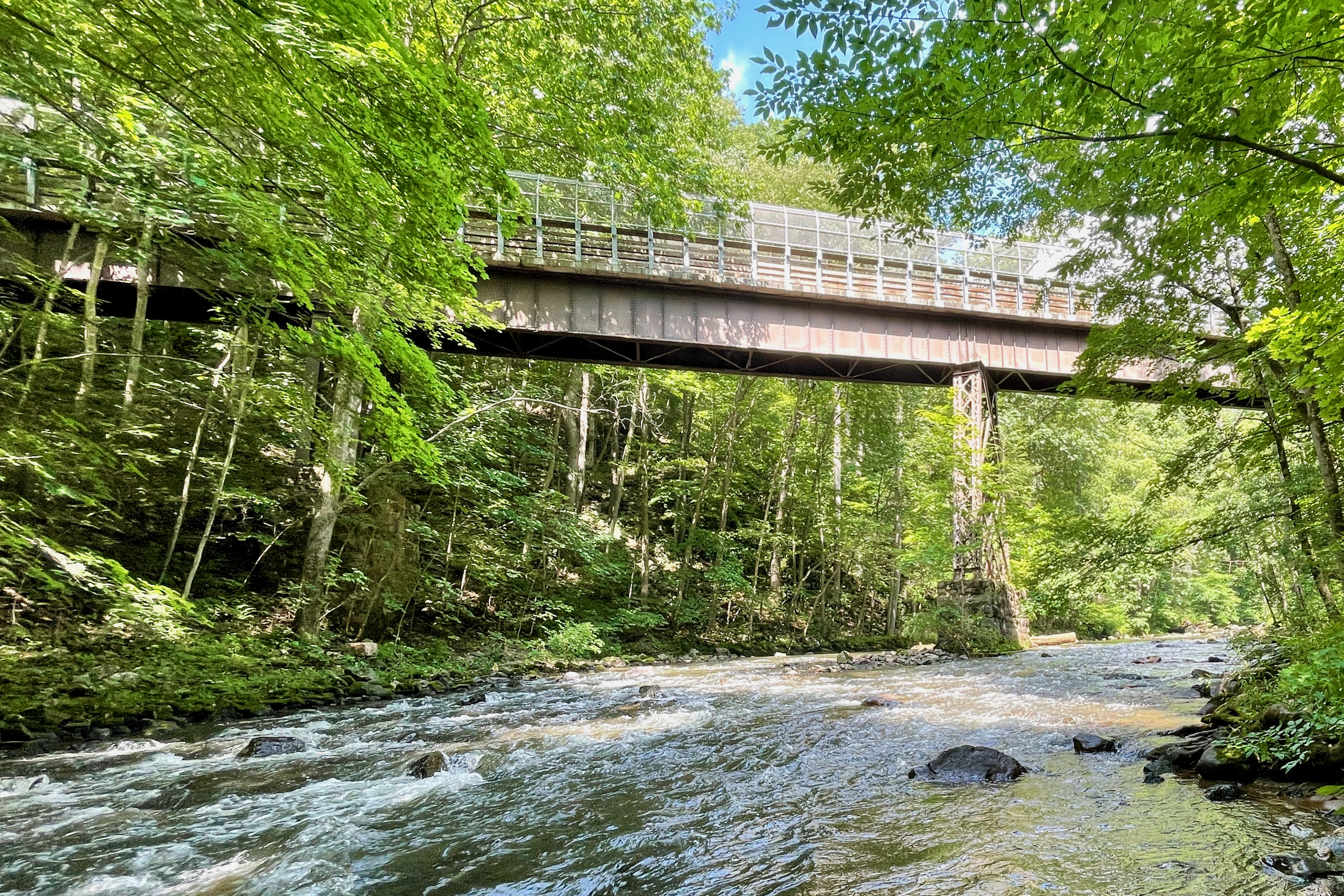
The Ken Lockwood Gorge Bridge

== Tributaries ==
- Allerton Creek
- Assicong Creek
- Beaver Brook
- Bushkill Brook
- Capoolong Creek
- Cramers Creek
- Drakes Brook
- Electric Brook
- Holland Brook
- Little Brook
- Minneaconing Creek
- Neshanic River
- Pleasant Run (Campbell's Brook)
- Prescott Brook
- Spruce Run
  - Mulhockaway Creek
- Sidney Brook
- Stony Brook (Washington Township - Morris County)
- Turkey Brook

== See also ==
- List of rivers of New Jersey
- List of crossings of the Raritan River
