= Transportation in New Jersey =

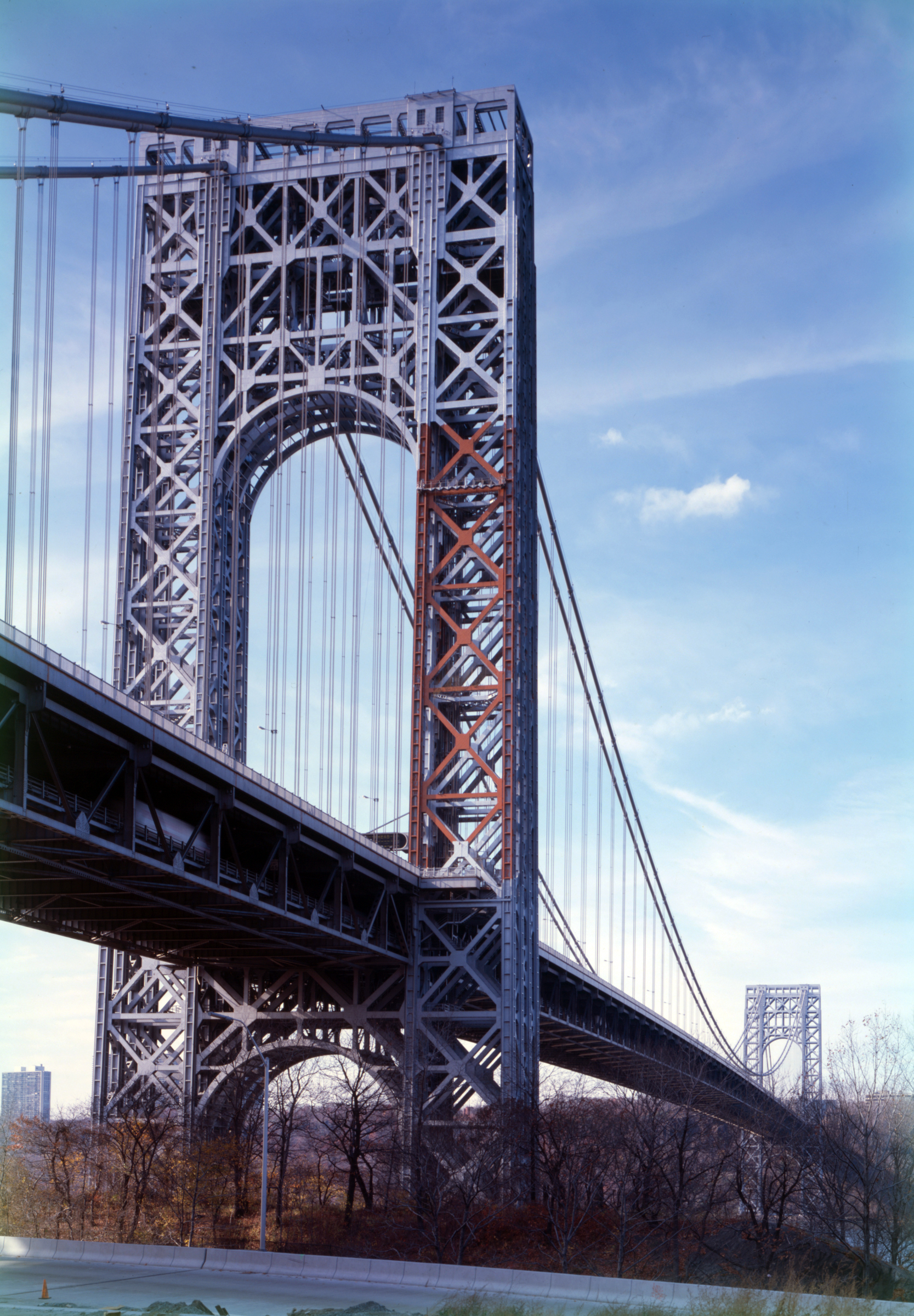
The George Washington Bridge, connecting Fort Lee, Bergen County, New Jersey to Manhattan in New York City, is the world's busiest motor vehicle bridge.

Transportation in New Jersey utilizes a combination of road, rail, air, and water modes. New Jersey is situated between Philadelphia and New York City, two major metropolitan centers of the Boston-Washington megalopolis, making it a regional corridor for transportation. As a result, New Jersey's freeways carry high volumes of interstate traffic and products. The main thoroughfare for long distance travel is the New Jersey Turnpike, the nation's fifth-busiest toll road. The Garden State Parkway connects the state's densely populated north to its southern shore region. New Jersey has the 4th smallest area of U.S. states, but its population density of 1,196 persons per sq. mi (462 persons per km^{2}) causes congestion to be a major issue for motorists.

New Jersey has a statewide mass transit system, centered on transportation to New York City and Philadelphia. New Jersey Transit, the chief operator of intrastate public transportation, manages three separate light rail systems, eleven commuter rail lines, and a statewide bus system. The Port Authority Trans-Hudson (PATH) links transportation hubs in Manhattan and northeastern New Jersey, while the PATCO Speedline connects downtown Philadelphia to Camden County, New Jersey. Intercity rail is operated by Amtrak along the Northeast Corridor between the major population centers of the Northeastern United States. In addition, New Jersey is home to Newark Liberty International Airport, the nation's fifth-busiest international gateway, and the Port Newark-Elizabeth Marine Terminal, the principal container ship facility of the Port of New York and New Jersey.

== Roadways ==
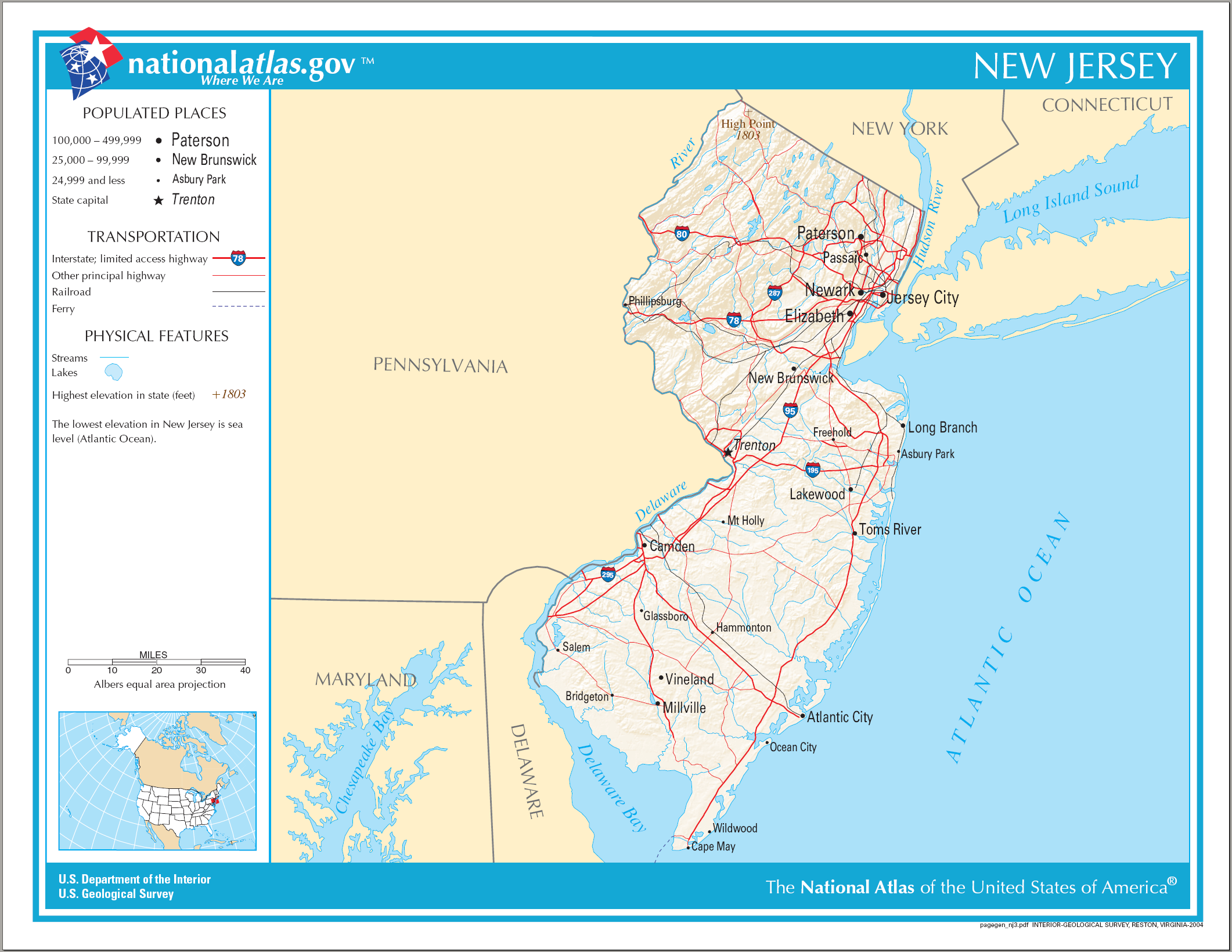
Map of New Jersey showing major roads and cities

New Jersey has 38,131 miles (61,366 km) of roads managed by state, county, and municipal governments and toll road authorities. The major roadways fall under the jurisdiction of the New Jersey Department of Transportation (NJDOT), which operates the state highway system. State-owned highways and toll roads consist of 7% of road mileage and 66% of traffic volume. In contrast, county and municipal roads consist of 93% of road mileage and 34% of traffic volume.

The US states of Oregon and New Jersey (shown in red) do not allow self-service.

New Jersey, along with Oregon, is one of only two states which prohibit customers from pumping gasoline at gas stations. (However, Oregon has recently changed the law, allowing self-service at night time in rural areas.) As a result, all gas stations are either full service or minimum service.

=== Distinctive features ===
==== Jughandles ====
According to the NJDOT, a jughandle is an "at-grade ramp" provided at or between intersections to permit motorists to make indirect left turns and/or U-turns. This design utilizes a setup that requires a motorist to use a ramp off the right lane of the main road in advance of the intersection or beyond the intersection. The NJDOT defines three types of jughandles in its design manual. "Type A" is the standard forward jughandle that intersects with a cross street. With forward ramps, all turning traffic (right and left) exit onto a jughandle ramp to the right. "Type B" is a variant with no cross-street intersected by the jughandle; it curves 90 degrees left to meet the main street, and is only used at a "T" intersection or a U-turn. "Type C" is the standard reverse jughandle; left-turning vehicles pass through the intersection and enter a ramp that loops roughly 270 degrees. Jughandles can cause motorist confusion because turning setups are inconsistent among intersections, and such an alignment is unfamiliar to motorists outside of the northeastern United States.

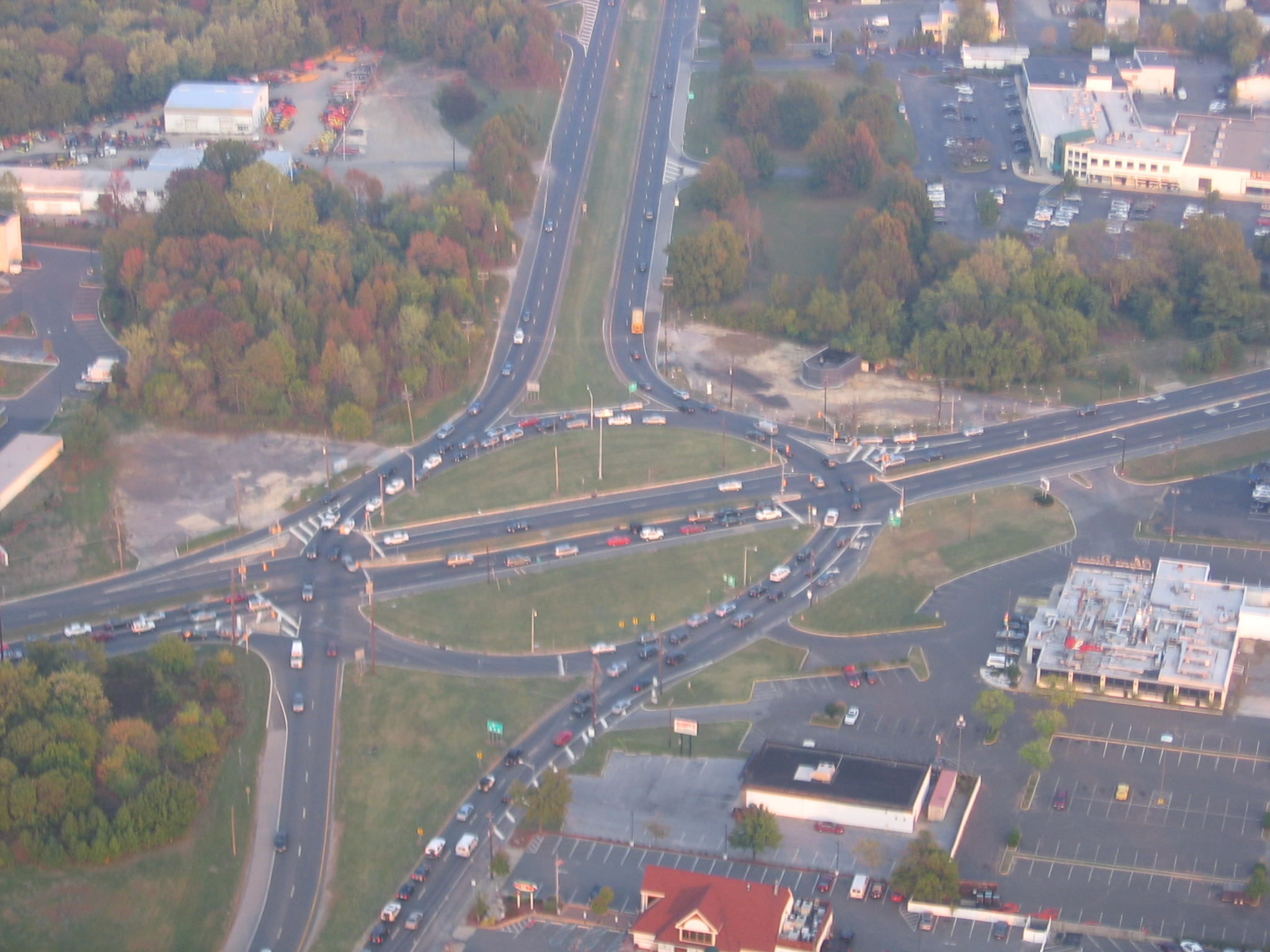
The Marlton Circle before its elimination in 2010

==== Traffic circles ====
In the 1920s and 1930s, traffic circles were built throughout the state because they were viewed as an efficient way to move traffic through three or more intersecting roads. As suburban and rural populations grew, the traffic circles became outdated because increased vehicle speed and traffic volume caused them to be more dangerous. Many traffic circles became notorious for having frequent accidents and being confusing, especially for non-locals. Part of the confusion has arisen because a circle is comprised as a series of uncontrolled intersections, so the driver to the right (entering the circle) has the right of way. Since the 1970s, the NJDOT has begun phasing out traffic circles by building a road through the circle, adding traffic signals, adding grade separation, or converting the circle into a modern roundabout.

==== Right-in/right-out expressways ====
A Right-in/right-out (RIRO) expressway (also called a Jersey freeway) is a partially limited-access divided highway without at-grade intersections. Despite its name, it is not a true freeway because driveways provide direct access to adjacent properties. A RIRO expressway employs interchanges, tight-radius ramps, and right turns to eliminate signalized intersections. To increase safety, RIRO expressways have a continuous median barrier and speed limits are lower than typical freeways. Examples are NJ 4, NJ 17, and NJ 208.

=== State highways ===
The NJDOT maintains the state's public road system. Each road is referred to as a Route, and most major highways within New Jersey are under NJDOT jurisdiction (except toll roads). State Routes are signed with the standard circular highway shield. Interstate Highways and U.S. Highways are assigned numbers corresponding to their existing route numbers, as there is no duplication between the systems. With the exception of Interstate Highways, most state highways are arterial roads with at-grade intersections, although several of these, such as NJ 24 and NJ 55, are built to freeway standards.

==== Interstate Highways ====
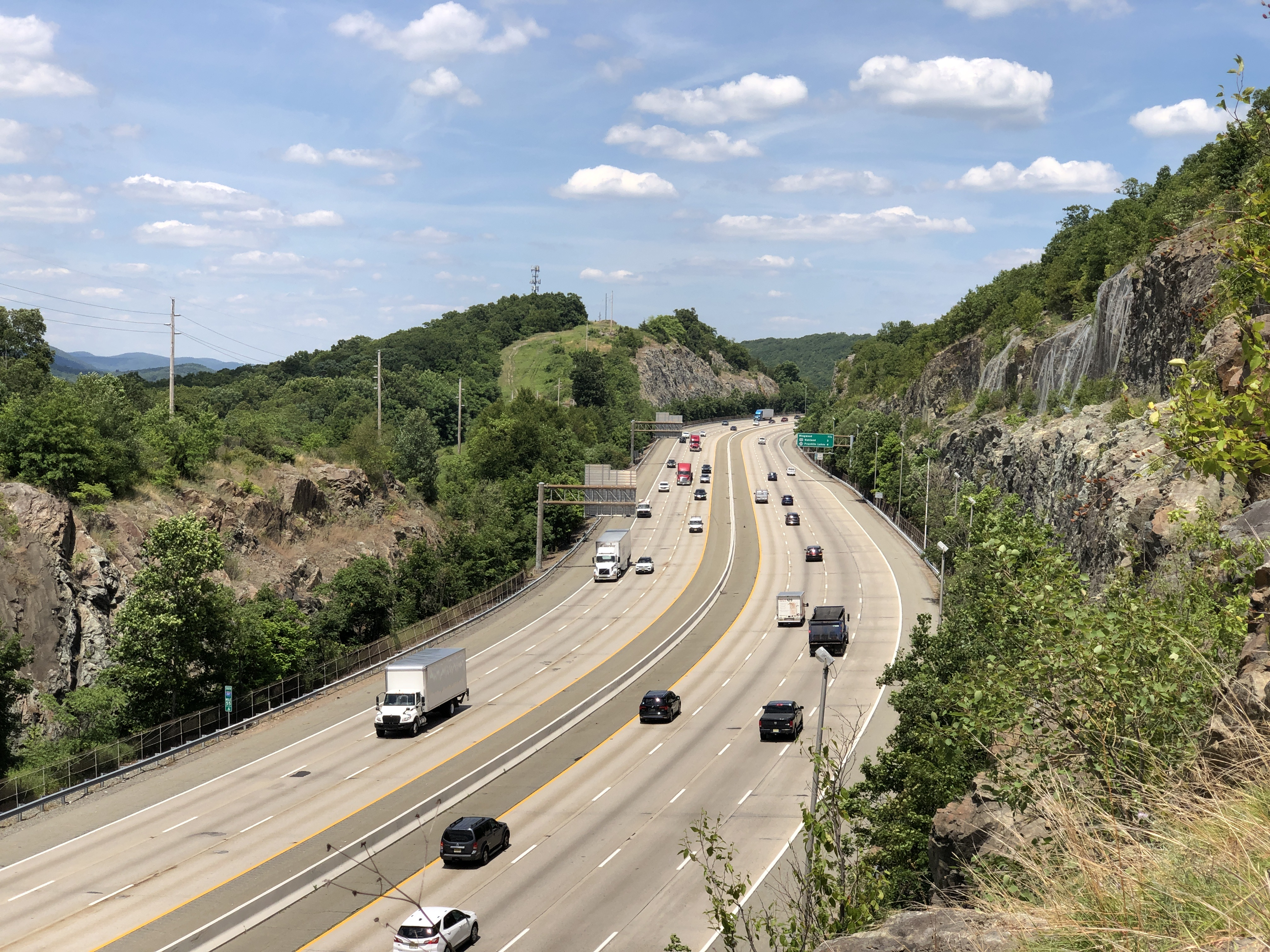
I-287 in a rock cut through the Ramapo Mountains, in Wanaque, New Jersey.

The Interstate Highway System includes 431 miles (694 km) of New Jersey's expressways and carries 20 percent of all vehicle travel. Interstate 95, which traverses the full length of the East Coast, is the most heavily traveled roadway in the state. Turnpikes are not included in New Jersey's Interstate Highway network, except for the northern section of the New Jersey Turnpike.

Even-numbered routes	Odd-numbered routes
Interstate 76; Interstate 676; Interstate 78; Interstate 278; Interstate 80; Interstate 280	Interstate 287; Interstate 95; Interstate 195; Interstate 295

==== U.S. Highways ====
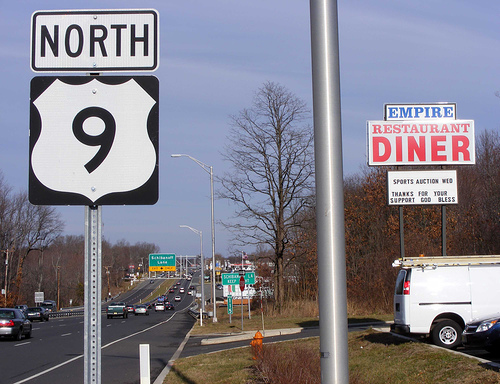
US 9 northbound in Freehold Township, New Jersey.

The U.S. Highway system is complementary to the Interstate Highway System. New Jersey's U.S. Highways have been gradually replaced by Interstate Highways and toll roads for long-distance travel, although the routes are still important for regional travel. The system is composed of principal arterial roads, which may feature jughandle ramps, interchanges, and traffic circles at major junctions.

Even-numbered routes	Odd-numbered routes
U.S. Route 202; U.S. Route 206; U.S. Route 22; U.S. Route 322; U.S. Route 30; U.S. Route 130; U.S. Route 40; U.S. Route 46	U.S. Route 1; U.S. Route 1 Business; U.S. Route 9; U.S. Route 9W; U.S. Route 1/9; U.S. Route 1/9 Truck

=== Toll roads ===
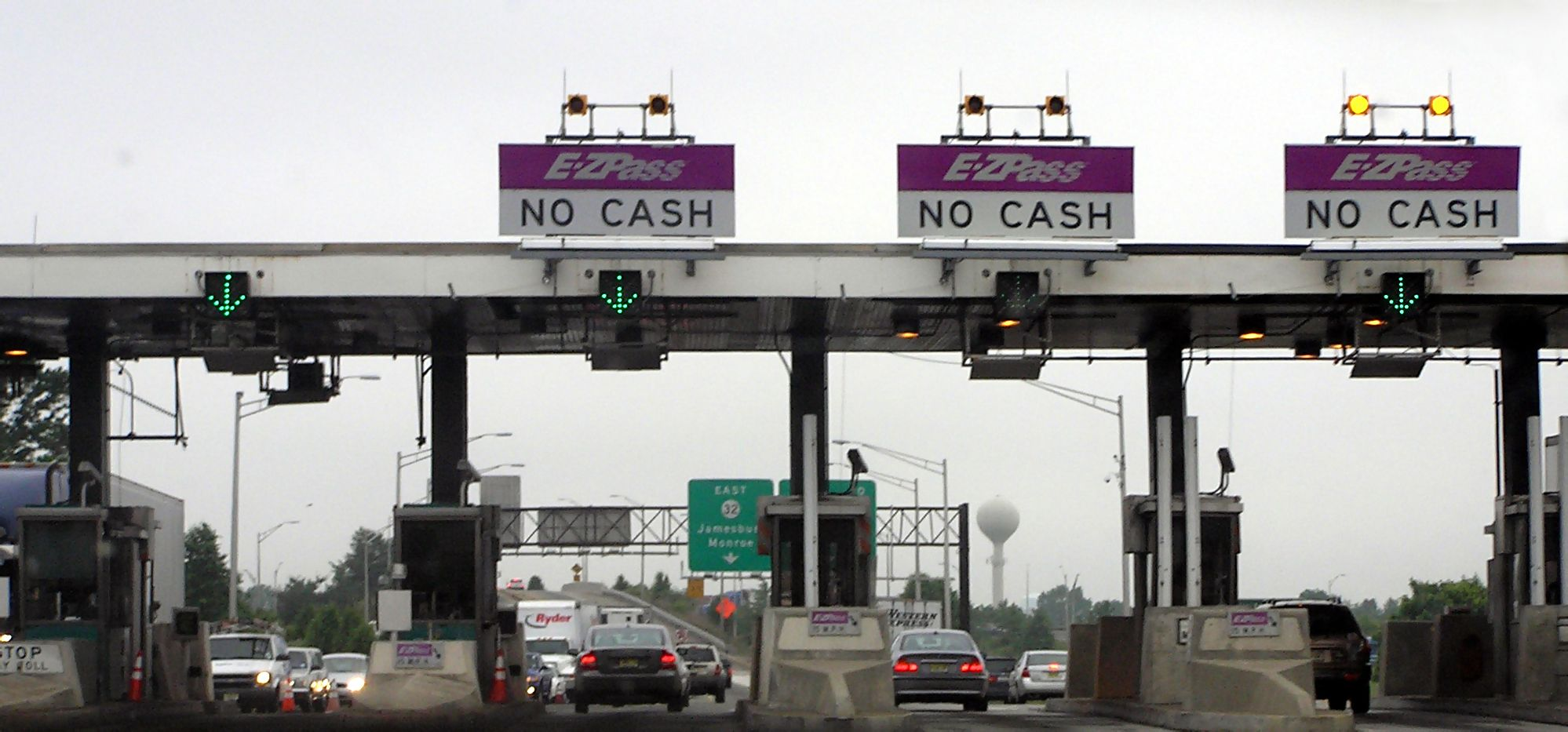
Variable signage and E-ZPass lanes at the Exit 8A Toll Gate of the New Jersey Turnpike.

New Jersey has a 356-mile (573 km) system of toll roads maintained by state agencies. Aside from portions of the New Jersey Turnpike designated as I-95 and I-78, none of the toll roads are Interstate Highways due to the restriction of tolled facilities or commercial establishments in the Interstate Highway System. New Jersey's toll roads are the New Jersey Turnpike, Garden State Parkway, and Atlantic City Expressway. The New Jersey Turnpike and Garden State Parkway are maintained by the New Jersey Turnpike Authority, and the Atlantic City Expressway is maintained by the South Jersey Transportation Authority. All toll roads have service areas, at which food, gas, and other commercial services are provided. In addition, New Jersey toll roads are assigned internal numbers by NJDOT—the New Jersey Turnpike is 700 (south of the split with I-95), the Garden State Parkway is 444, the Palisades Interstate Parkway (not tolled, but maintained by the Palisades Interstate Park Commission) is 445, and the Atlantic City Expressway is 446.

=== County routes ===
All 21 counties in New Jersey have designated county routes. County routes are divided into 500-series routes, which complement the state highway system, and the 600-series routes assigned independently in each county. Each route is usually referred to by its preexisting local name in an address.

=== Bridges and tunnels ===
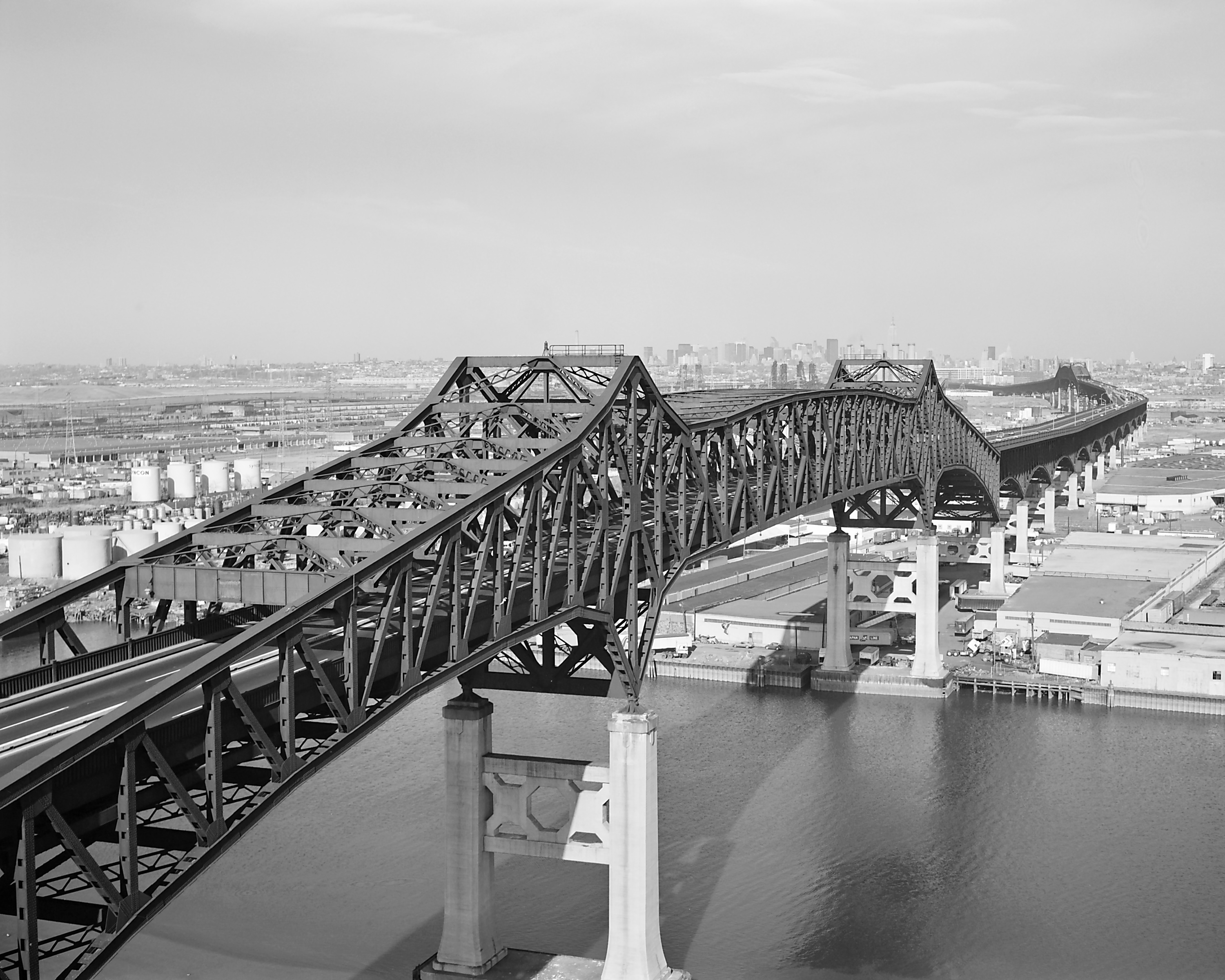
Opened in 1932, the Pulaski Skyway spans the Passaic and Hackensack rivers.

New Jersey has interstate compacts with all three neighboring states. The Port Authority of New York and New Jersey, the Delaware River Port Authority (Pennsylvania), the Delaware River Joint Toll Bridge Commission (Pennsylvania), and the Delaware River and Bay Authority (Delaware) operate nearly all of the bridges and tunnels between other states. Tolls are collected in one direction; it is free to cross into New Jersey, but motorists must pay when exiting the state. The exception to this is the Dingman's Ferry Bridge where tolls are charged both ways.

The following table lists bridges with an Interstate Highway or U.S. Highway route, the four bridges to Philadelphia, and the six crossings to New York City:

Hudson River	Kill Van Kull	Arthur Kill
George Washington Bridge; Lincoln Tunnel; Holland Tunnel	Bayonne Bridge	Goethals Bridge; Outerbridge Crossing
Delaware River		Within New Jersey
Milford–Montague Toll Bridge; Delaware Water Gap Toll Bridge; Easton–Phillipsburg Toll Bridge; Interstate 78 Toll Bridge; New Hope–Lambertville Toll Bridge; Scudder Falls Bridge; Trenton–Morrisville Toll Bridge	Delaware River–Turnpike Toll Bridge; Tacony–Palmyra Bridge; Betsy Ross Bridge; Benjamin Franklin Bridge; Walt Whitman Bridge; Commodore Barry Bridge; Delaware Memorial Bridge	Pulaski Skyway; Newark Bay Bridge; Edison Bridge; Driscoll Bridge; Basilone Bridge; Donald and Morris Goodkind Bridges; Great Egg Harbor Bridge

== Mass transit ==
=== Buses ===
==== Public bus service ====
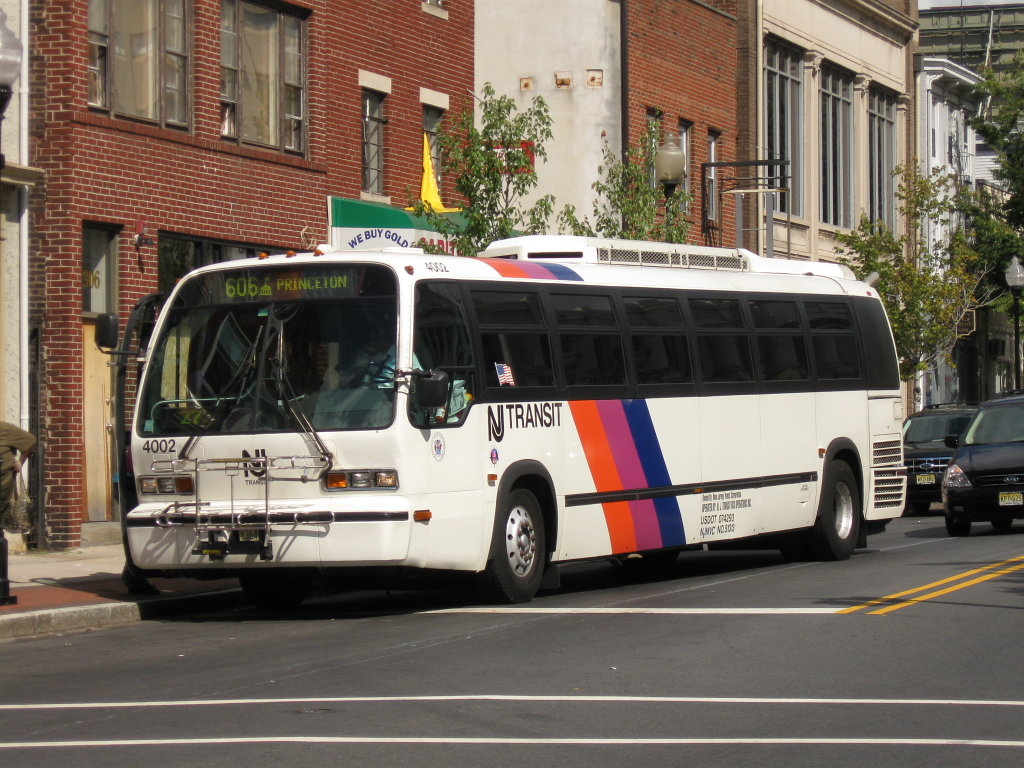
New Jersey Transit 606 bus in Trenton, en route to Princeton.

New Jersey Transit operates 247 bus routes throughout the state with 1785 buses under direct control and 327 buses leased to private operators. New Jersey Transit provides local, commuter, and long-distance bus service in all 21 New Jersey counties. Outside of the state, New Jersey Transit has bus lines terminating at the Port Authority Bus Terminal and George Washington Bridge Bus Terminal in Manhattan, and the Greyhound Terminal in Philadelphia. 2 routes, the 196 and 197 terminate in Warwick, New York. New Jersey Transit's Wheels division is operated under contract by private companies using smaller fleets.

==== Private bus carriers ====
Several private bus companies serve New Jersey. Most of these carriers operate with state funding to offset losses, and state owned buses are provided to these carriers of which Coach USA companies make up the bulk. Other carriers include private charter and tour bus operators that take gamblers from other parts of New Jersey, New York City, Philadelphia, and Delaware to the casino resorts of Atlantic City. Dollar vans augment other systems in Hudson, eastern Bergen, and Passaic counties.

Major private bus carriers in New Jersey:
Carrier		Areas of operation
Academy		Commuter bus service from Burlington, Middlesex, Monmouth, and Ocean counties to lower and midtown Manhattan
Broadway Bus		Local bus service in Bayonne
Coach USA Carriers	Community Coach	Commuter bus service from Essex and Morris counties
Coach USA Carriers	Hudson Transit Lines/Shortline	Commuter bus service from Bergen County to Orange County, New York, Rockland County, New York, and Manhattan; Casino bus service from Bergen, Hudson, and Union counties to Atlantic City
Coach USA Carriers	ONE Bus/Olympia Trails	Express bus from Newark Liberty International Airport to Manhattan
Coach USA Carriers	Rockland Coaches	Commuter and local bus service from Bergen County to Manhattan
Coach USA Carriers	Suburban Trails	Commuter bus service from Middlesex County to Manhattan; local bus service in Middlesex County
DeCamp Bus Lines		Charter Only
Greyhound		Interstate bus service from terminals in Newark, Atlantic City, and Mount Laurel
Lakeland Bus Lines		Commuter and local bus service from Morris, Somerset, Union, and Sussex counties to Manhattan
Martz Trailways		Service from Warren County to Manhattan
OurBus		Commuter bus service from Middlesex County and Essex County to Manhattan; Intercity service from North and Central Jersey points to Maryland and Washington, DC
Saddle River Tours/Ameribus		Charter Only
Susquehanna Trailways		Commuter bus service from Newark and Somerville to Central Pennsylvania
Trans-Bridge Lines		Service from the Skylands Region to and from Manhattan

==== Jitney buses ====
Several cities in New Jersey are served by private jitney buses, including Paterson, Passaic, Union City, Jersey City, and Atlantic City. These services are operated with a variety of vehicles, from small cutaway minibuses, to full-sized coach buses. They operate without published schedules, but at high frequency. In some cases, buses run as often as once every minute.

Major jitney bus carriers
Carrier	Areas of operation
Spanish Transportation	Paterson to New York via Route 4, Paterson/Passaic to New York via Route 3
Community Lines	Journal Square to New York via Kennedy Boulevard
Sphinx Transportation	North Bergen to New York via Boulevard East
Atlantic City Jitney Association	Local service in Downtown Atlantic City

Numerous other small companies and owner-operators provide jitney bus service along major bus corridors in Hudson County.

=== Railroads ===
==== Rapid transit ====
===== PATH =====
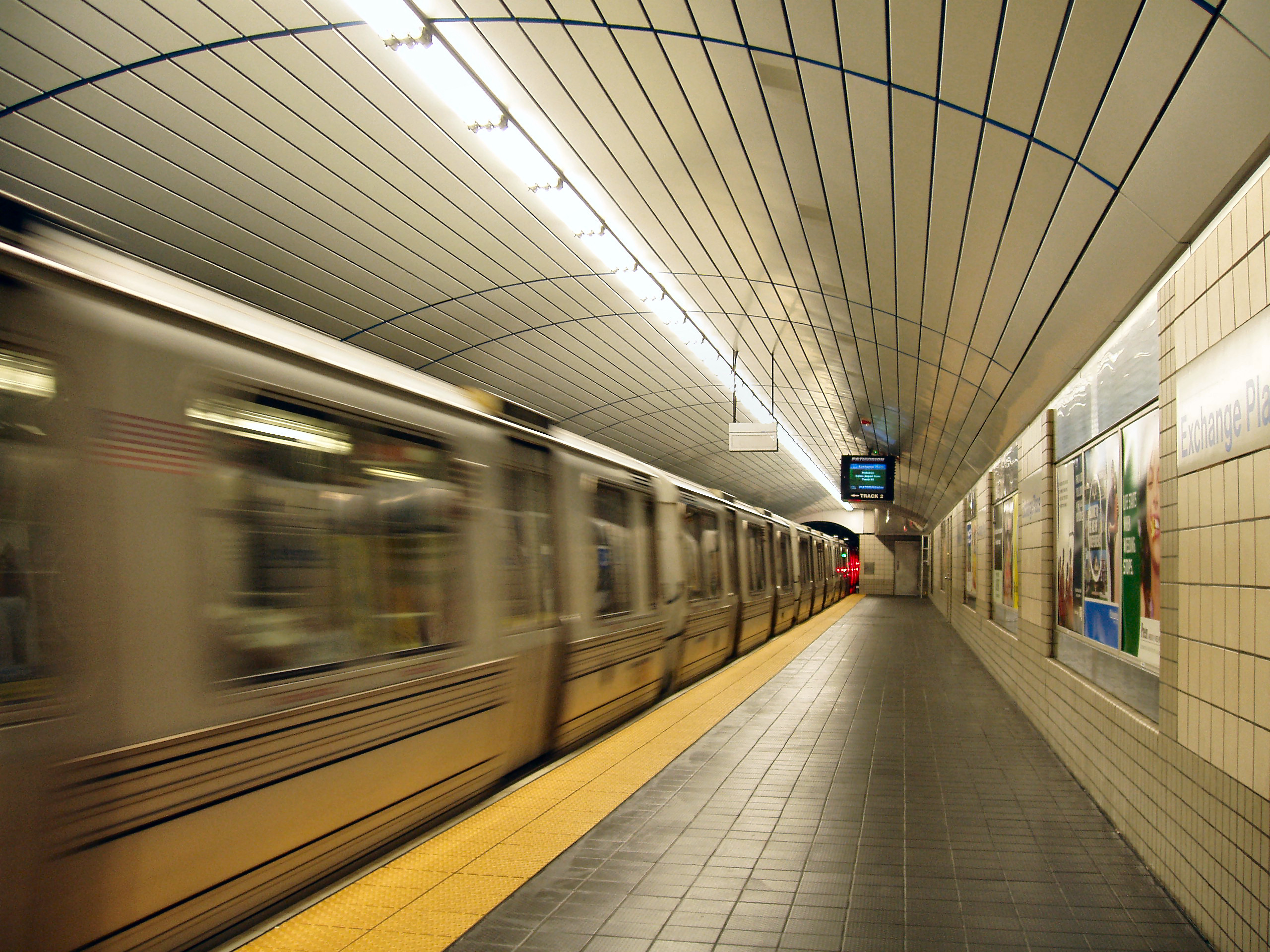
PATH train emerging from the Hudson Tubes into Exchange Place station.

The Port Authority of New York and New Jersey operates the Port Authority Trans-Hudson (PATH), linking the New Jersey cities of Newark, Harrison, Jersey City and Hoboken to Manhattan. Opened in 1908 as the Hudson and Manhattan Railroad, PATH has been operated by PANYNJ since 1962.

PATH has 13 stations and spans 13.8 miles (22.2 km) of route mileage (not including track overlap). PATH operates 24 hours a day, seven days a week. During normal hours, PATH operates four train services, using three terminals in New Jersey and two in Manhattan. On weekends, holidays, and from 11:00 pm to 5:00 am Monday to Friday, PATH combines the lines to operate two train services. Although there are no free transfers in Manhattan, several Manhattan stations are adjacent to New York City Subway stations.

===== PATCO =====
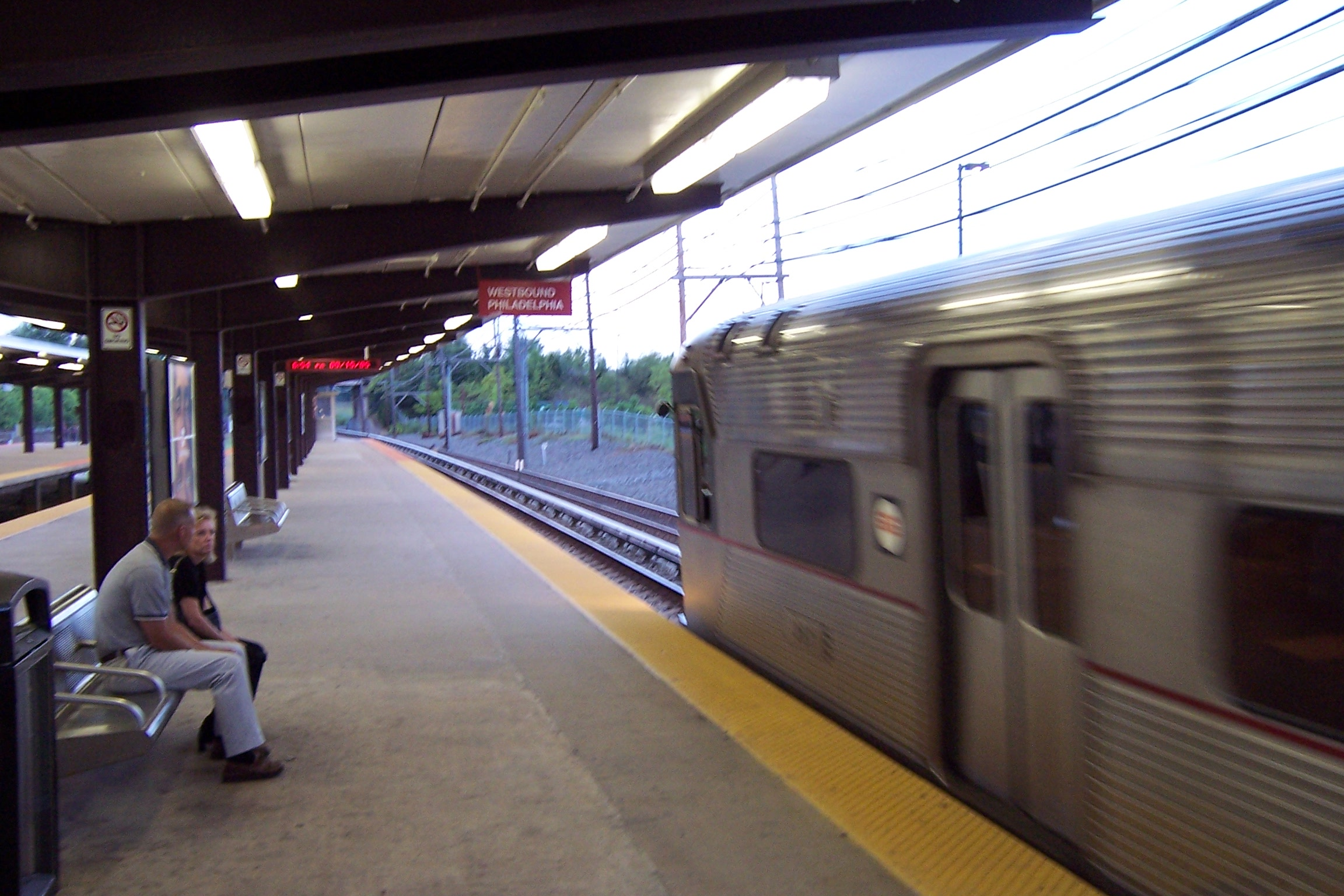
PATCO Woodcrest station

The Delaware River Port Authority operates the PATCO Speedline between Camden County in New Jersey and Center City, Philadelphia. The line has four stations in Philadelphia and nine stations in New Jersey, and is 14.2 miles (22.9 km) long. The New Jersey stations have park and ride facilities, and a major stop at Woodcrest Station is directly connected to Exit 31 of Interstate 295. The PATCO Speedline operates 24 hours a day, although connecting rail facilities maintained by SEPTA and NJ Transit are closed during late night.

==== Light rail ====
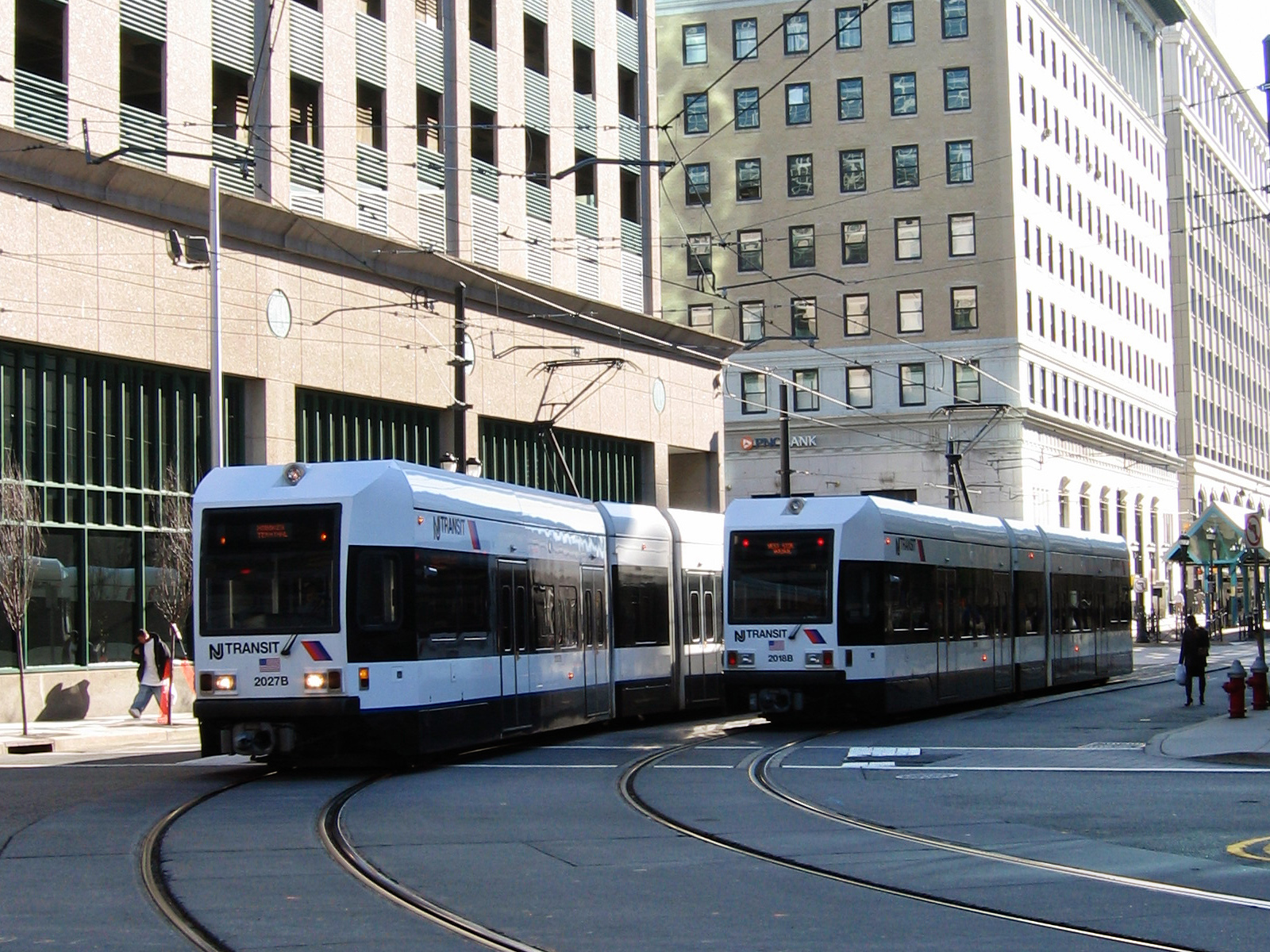
Two Hudson-Bergen Light Rail trains passing each other near Exchange Place.

New Jersey Transit manages three separate light rail lines: the Hudson-Bergen Light Rail, Newark Light Rail, and River Line. All of New Jersey Transit's light rail systems operate on a proof-of-payment fare collection system, as is typical of light rail systems throughout the United States.

The oldest of the three systems is the Newark Light Rail, consisting of the original Newark City Subway and the newer Broad Street Line. The Newark City Subway was opened in 1935, and was the sole remaining streetcar line when New Jersey Transit took operations in 1980. The Broad Street Line, which operates between Newark Penn Station and Broad Street Station, was opened in 2006.

The Hudson-Bergen Light Rail and the River Line were constructed by New Jersey Transit during the early 2000s using the rights-of-way of freight railroads. The first Minimum Operating Segment of the Hudson-Bergen Light Rail was completed in 2002, and in 2006, service to its current northern terminus of Tonnele Avenue began. The River Line, despite not receiving federal funding due to low ridership projections, was completed in 2004. The River Line uses lightweight diesel multiple units, running along trackage owned by Conrail between Trenton and Camden.

==== Commuter rail ====
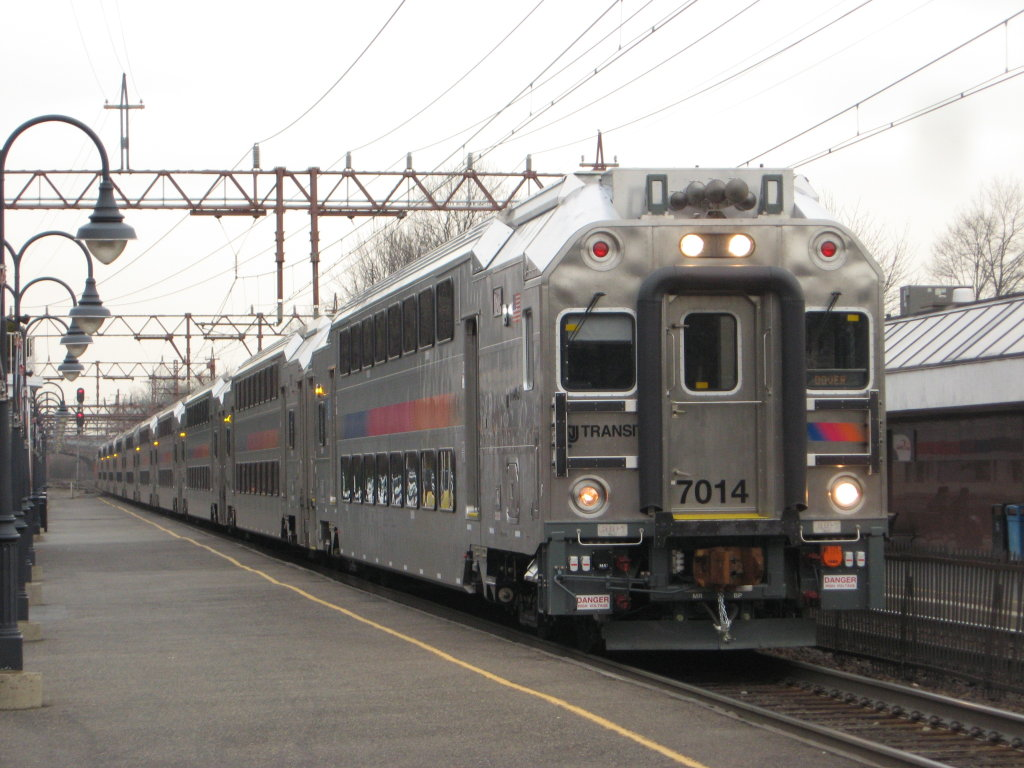
Ten car, multilevel Morris & Essex Line train pulling into Millburn Station.

The New Jersey Transit Rail Operations division consists of 11 lines and 162 stations, primarily concentrated in northern New Jersey. It is the largest commuter rail system in the United States in terms of track mileage (951 route miles) and fourth-largest in terms of weekday ridership. The rail lines are divided into two divisions: the Hoboken Division, former Erie-Lackawanna Railroad lines that run from Hoboken Terminal or through Newark-Broad St.; and the Newark Division, former Pennsylvania Railroad, CRNJ, and NYLBR lines that run through Newark Penn Station on the Northeast Corridor. The Newark Division also includes the Atlantic City Line, previously operated by the Pennsylvania-Reading Seashore Lines. Across the system, stations range in size from urban complexes such as New York Penn Station to simple stops with only a small platform. Additionally, SEPTA offers service to their stations in Center City Philadelphia from their termini on the West Trenton Line and the Trenton Line.

NJ Transit Rail Lines
Hoboken Division	Newark Division
Bergen County Line Main Line Gladstone Branch Morristown Line Meadowlands Rail Line Montclair–Boonton Line Pascack Valley Line	Atlantic City Line North Jersey Coast Line Northeast Corridor Line Princeton Branch Raritan Valley Line

==== Intercity rail ====
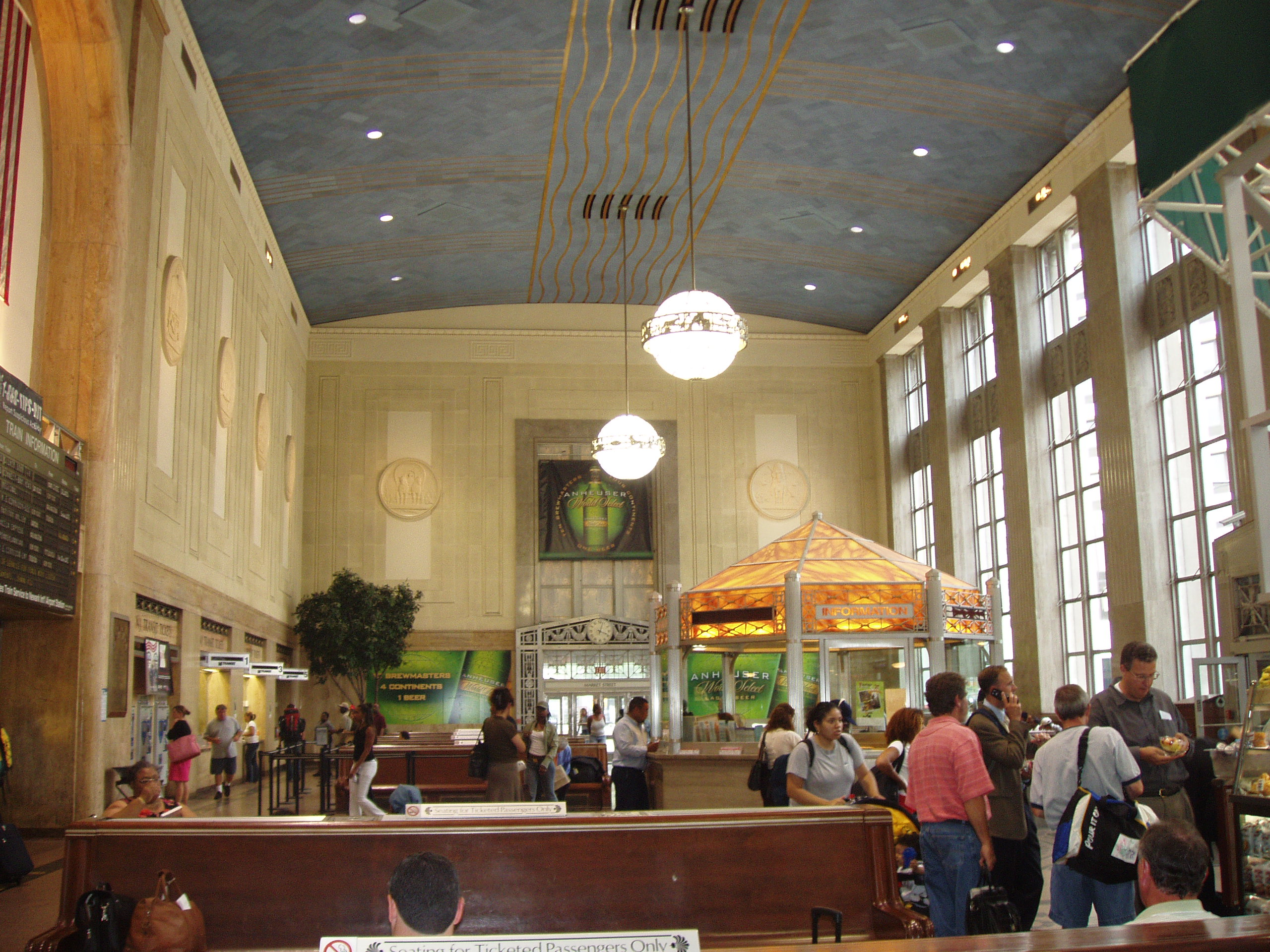
Interior of Newark Penn Station, the busiest Amtrak station in New Jersey

Amtrak operates intercity passenger rail service in New Jersey along the electrified Northeast Corridor between Boston and Washington. Amtrak operates approximately 110 trains daily in New Jersey.

Amtrak operates two local routes: the Northeast Regional and Keystone Service. The Northeast Regional travels along the full length of the Northeast Corridor (except for a few trains which travel to Springfield, Massachusetts). From Washington, some extended service travels to Virginia as far as Newport News, Norfolk or Roanoke. The Keystone Service travels along the Northeast Corridor, and continues along the Keystone Corridor past 30th Street Station. While certain trains only travel along the Keystone Corridor, others continue past Philadelphia to New York.

Amtrak's high-speed Acela Express uses tilting technology to reach a maximum speed of 135 miles per hour (217 km/h) between Washington and New York. The speed of the Acela Express has made it competitive with the speed of regional air shuttles, and has allowed it to capture over half of the air/rail market of the cities it passes through.

The state's busiest Amtrak station, Penn Station in Newark, is also the 14th busiest station in the Amtrak system. This is mainly because it is frequently used as an alternative stop for Amtrak passengers traveling in the New York area, as well as its status as the sole intercity rail station in heavily populated northeastern New Jersey.

Station	Train departures per week			Passengers (FY 2009)
Station	Acela Express	Northeast Regional	Keystone Service	Passengers (FY 2009)
Trenton	10	310	116	411,869
Princeton Junction	—	20	14	40,623
New Brunswick	—	8	5	7,204
Metropark	85	269	11	369,477
Newark Airport	—	134	12	109,517
Newark Penn Station	176	310	116	630,939

In addition, Amtrak operates several daily and night trains, which stop at Newark Penn Station and Trenton Rail Station:

Train	Terminals		Frequency	Total stations	Route miles
Cardinal	New York	Chicago	3 trains per week	32	1,147 miles (1,846 km)
Carolinian	New York	Charlotte	Daily	24	704 miles (1,133 km)
Crescent	New York	New Orleans	Daily	33	1,377 miles (2,216 km)
Palmetto	New York	Savannah	Daily	20	829 miles (1,334 km)
Pennsylvanian	New York	Pittsburgh	Daily	19	444 miles (715 km)
Silver Meteor	New York	Miami	Daily	32	1,389 miles (2,235 km)
Silver Star	New York	Miami	Daily	36	1,522 miles (2,449 km)
Vermonter	St. Albans	Washington	Daily	30	611 miles (983 km)

=== Ferries ===
==== Delaware River and Bay ====
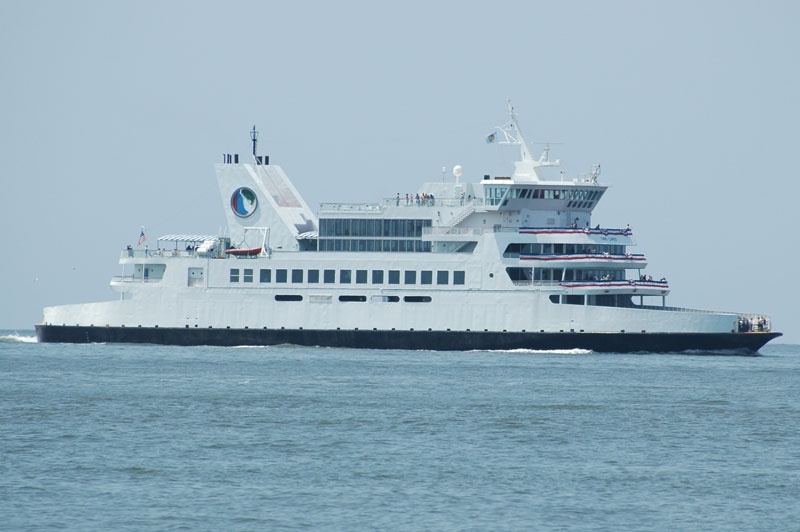
M.V. Twin Capes of the Cape May – Lewes Ferry

On the Delaware Bay, the Delaware River and Bay Authority (DRBA) operates the Cape May – Lewes Ferry, a 17-mile (27 km) ferry between Cape May, New Jersey and Lewes, Delaware. The Cape May-Lewes Ferry carries both automobiles and foot passengers, and the ferry trip takes approximately 80 minutes one way. The fleet includes three vessels, each having a capacity of approximately 100 cars and 1000 passengers. The DRBA also operates the Forts Ferry Crossing between Fort Mott, New Jersey and Fort Delaware and Fort DuPont in Delaware.

The Delaware River Port Authority manages the RiverLink Ferry between the Camden waterfront and Penn's Landing in Philadelphia. Its vessels are the Independence, a 150-passenger vessel, and Freedom Ferry, a 600-passenger vessel.

==== New York Harbor ====
Several private companies operate ferries from New Jersey to Manhattan. The largest privately owned ferry companies are BillyBey Ferry Company and NY Waterway, which run ferries from Hudson County on the Hudson River, East River and Upper New York Bay and East River. NY Waterway also operates a ferry between Edgewater and the 39th Street Terminal and a ferry from Belford to Pier 11 at Wall Street. Liberty Water Taxi operates routes from Liberty State Park to the World Financial Center, Ellis Island and Liberty Island. SeaStreak operates ferries from the Raritan Bayshore through The Narrows.

== Freight transport ==
In 2003, nearly 621 million tons of freight were transported into, out of, within, and through New Jersey. One third of tonnage moves into the state, 27 percent moves outbound from the state, and 20 percent of tonnage moves within the state. The remaining 20 percent of tonnage consists of through traffic that originates and terminates outside of the state (based on truck and rail data). Trucks account for 75 percent of all goods moved in New Jersey and 97 percent of the volume of intrastate goods by weight. 36 percent of inbound goods and 22 percent of outbound goods are transported by water.

=== Railroads ===
New Jersey's freight rail system allows cost-effective shipment of goods and reduces traffic on highways. In 2007, New Jersey railroads carried 1,434,930 carloads of freight: 749,587 carloads were imported and 555,444 carloads were exported. The state has approximately 1,000 miles (1,600 km) of rail freight lines, operated by 3 national railroads, 2 regional railroads, and 14 short-line railroads. Major commodities shipped by rail include petrochemicals, construction materials, food products, raw materials, and finished goods for manufacturers.

=== Seaports ===
==== Port of New York and New Jersey ====
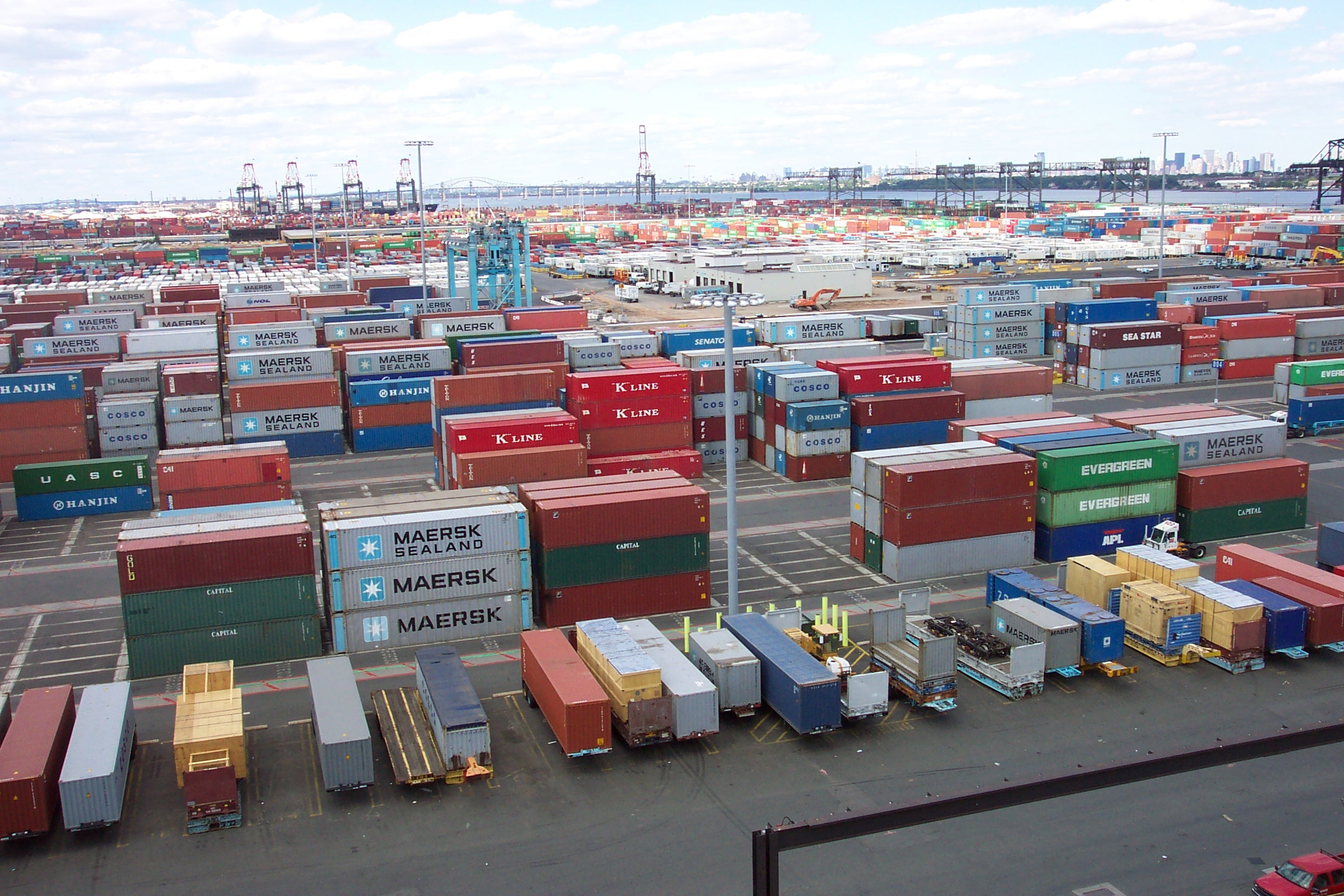
Thousands of intermodal shipping containers at the Port Newark-Elizabeth Marine Terminal, waiting to be transferred between ships, trains, and trucks.

The Port Authority of New York and New Jersey manages the Port Newark-Elizabeth Marine Terminal, the principal container ship facility in the Port of New York and New Jersey. The facility consists of two integrated ports, Port Newark and the Elizabeth-Port Authority Marine Terminal, which sit next to each other. The Port Newark-Elizabeth Marine Terminal is situated on Newark Bay, just east of the New Jersey Turnpike and Newark Liberty International Airport. It handles the largest container volume of any port in the eastern United States, and the third largest in the country. Since the facility is largely automated, it requires few workers and less container handling. The Port Authority also manages the Port Jersey along the Bayonne/Jersey City waterfront.

==== Delaware River ====
New Jersey has three ports along the Delaware River managed by the South Jersey Port Corporation (SJPC). The Port of Camden was established in 1834, and has been operated by the SJPC since 1928. The Port of Camden, composed of the Broadway Terminal and the Beckett Street Terminal, has rail and highway connections, and its Broadway Produce Terminal is capable of handling live produce. The South Jersey Port Corporation also operates the Port of Salem. The Port of Paulsboro is located across the river from the Philadelphia International Airport. Formerly a BP storage site for petroleum and chemicals, the facility is undergoing a renovation to relieve congestion from the ports of Camden.

=== Pipelines ===
Twenty-four companies operate 35,121 miles (56,522 km) of pipelines in New Jersey. Of the total pipeline length, 94.2% is used for gas distribution, 4.2% is used for gas transmission, and 1.5% carries hazardous liquid.

== Aviation ==
=== Commercial airports ===
==== Newark Liberty International Airport ====
Newark Liberty International Airport (EWR) is the 10th-busiest airport and fifth-busiest international air gateway in the United States. Newark Liberty is operated by the Port Authority of New York and New Jersey, which manages the other two major airports in the New York metropolitan area, John F. Kennedy International Airport (JFK) and LaGuardia Airport (LGA), along with three smaller airports including Teterboro Airport. It is about 15 miles (24 km) southwest of Midtown Manhattan (New York City).

In addition to domestic flights, Newark Liberty has extensive international service covering all inhabited continents except for Oceania. United Airlines operates its third-largest hub at the facility, after O'Hare International Airport in Chicago, and George W. Bush Intercontinental Airport in Houston, making it the airport's largest tenant. In 2001, Continental Airlines began non-stop service between Newark Liberty and Hong Kong, making it the terminus of the world's longest non-stop scheduled airline route. Since 2001, Continental (merged with United) has expanded international service to include Beijing, Shanghai, and Delhi. FedEx Express, which operates a large cargo hub at the airport, is the second-largest tenant. This hub design makes United Airlines by far the leading carrier in the New York market. The parking and terminals are connected by AirTrain Newark, which links to the Newark Liberty International Airport Station for transfers to Amtrak and NJ Transit trains. The AirTrain runs 24 hours a day between the airport and train with NJ Transit. Day Trains run every three minutes from 5:00 am to midnight (from 07:00 pm on Sundays). In the night, the train runs every 15 minutes

==== Atlantic City International Airport ====
Aside from Newark International Airport, the only other scheduled airline service is at Atlantic City International Airport (ACY), a regional airport located 9 miles (14 km) northwest of downtown Atlantic City. ACY has two runways and one terminal; current construction will upgrade airport baggage handling, expand the terminal to 14 jet bridges, and enlarge the service apron. Spirit Airlines is the airport's largest operator, and AirTran Airways has begun flights to Atlanta and Orlando from the airport. In addition, the airport is used for general aviation, military purposes, FAA testing, and other research.

=== Non-commercial airports ===
==== Teterboro Airport ====
Located 12 miles (19 km) from midtown Manhattan in the New Jersey Meadowlands, Teterboro Airport is the main general aviation airport of New York City, and one of the busiest non-commercial airports in the country. Teterboro Airport is operated by the Port Authority of New York and New Jersey.

==== Trenton-Mercer Airport ====
Trenton-Mercer Airport is a regional airport located 4 miles (6.4 km) northwest of downtown Trenton in Ewing Township. The airport formerly hosted scheduled commercial service, but has been left without a commercial airline ever since Boston-Maine Airways terminated its flights to Hanscom Field in Bedford, Massachusetts. It is currently used for general and corporate aviation. Streamline, a subsidiary of Charter Air Transport, is prepared to start commercial service at Trenton-Mercer Airport on April 5.

==== McGuire Air Force Base ====
The McGuire Air Force Base is an active Air Force base located approximately 35 miles (56 km) east of Philadelphia that is part of Joint Base McGuire-Dix-Lakehurst. The base hosts the 87th Air Base Wing, 305th Air Mobility Wing, the Air Force Reserve Command's 514th Air Mobility Wing, and the New Jersey Air National Guard's 108th Air Refueling Wing. McGuire is the only U.S. Air Force base hosting three AMC-gained flying wings of the Regular Air Force, Air Force Reserve and Air National Guard.

== See also ==
- Plug-in electric vehicles in New Jersey
- Transportation in New York City
- Transportation in Philadelphia
