= List of crossings of the Raritan River =

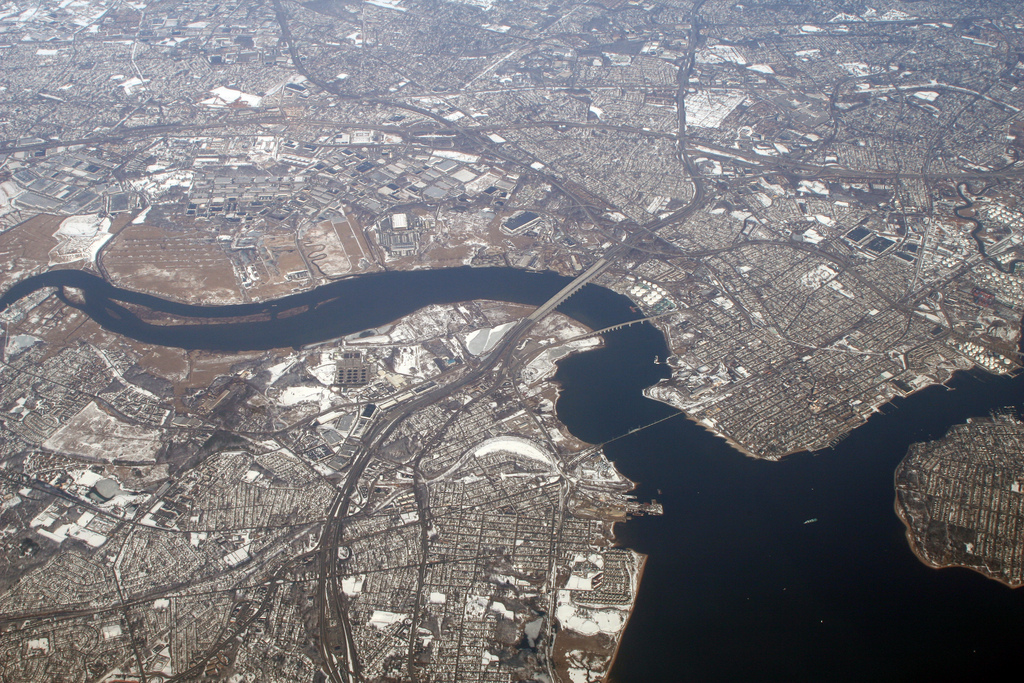
The Raritan river at its mouth at Raritan Bay, an arm of the Upper New York Bay

This is a list of road/highway and rail crossings of the Raritan River from the mouth at Raritan Bay upstream. It also includes crossings of its two branches: the North Branch Raritan River and the South Branch Raritan River.

== Crossings ==
Crossing	Image	Carries	Location	Coordinates
=== Main stem ===
Raritan Bay Drawbridge		NJ Transit North Jersey Coast Line; Norfolk Southern Railway; CSX	Perth Amboy, South Amboy	40.4961°N 74.2810°W
Victory Bridge		NJ 35		40.5077°N 74.2919°W
Edison Bridge		US 9 north		40.5090°N 74.3003°W
Ellis S. Vieser Memorial Bridge		US 9 south		40.5090°N 74.3006°W
Driscoll Bridge		Garden State Parkway		40.5090°N 74.3013°W
Basilone Bridge		I-95; New Jersey Turnpike		40.4884°N 74.3963°W
Morris Goodkind Bridge		US 1 north		40.4927°N 74.4127°W
Donald Goodkind Bridge		US 1 south		40.4926°N 74.4131°W
Albany Street Bridge		NJ 27; County Route 514		40.4975°N 74.4377°W
Raritan River Bridge (Northeast Corridor)		Amtrak Northeast Corridor; NJ Transit Northeast Corridor Line		40.5011°N 74.4409°W
John A. Lynch Sr. Memorial Bridge		NJ 18	New Brunswick, Piscataway	40.5084°N 74.4586°W
Landing Lane Bridge		County Route 609	New Brunswick, Piscataway	40.5086°N 74.4638°W
I-287 Bridge		I-287	Piscataway, Franklin Township	40.5397°N 74.5119°W
Rail bridge (abandoned)		Rail		40.5588°N 74.5240°W
Queen's Bridge		County Route 527		40.5596°N 74.5278°W
I-287 Bridge		I-287	Franklin Township	40.5542°N 74.5445°W
Rail bridges		Conrail Shared Assets Operations		40.5497°N 74.5687°W
Rail bridge		Conrail Shared Assets Operations		40.5518°N 74.5720°W
Rail bridge (abandoned)		Rail		40.5527°N 74.5754°W
Van Veghten's Bridge		County Route 533	Finderne, Manville	40.5553°N 74.5832°W
U.S. Route 206 Bridge		US 206		40.5562°N 74.6159°W
Rail bridge (abandoned)		Rail		40.5575°N 74.6206°W
Nevius Street Bridge		Pedestrian Bridge	Raritan, Hillsborough Township	40.5646°N 74.6357°W
John Basilone Veterans Memorial Bridge		County Route 625	Raritan, Hillsborough Township	40.5647°N 74.6368°W
=== North Branch ===
Old York Road Bridge		County Route 567	Branchburg	40.5567°N 74.6879°W
North Branch Bridge		NJ 28; County Route 614	North Branch	40.6000°N 74.6737°W
U.S. Route 202 and U.S. Route 206 Bridge		US 202; US 206	Bedminster	40.6611°N 74.6456°W
=== South Branch ===
Studdiford Drive Bridge		Studdiford Drive	South Branch	40.5468°N 74.6963°W
Neshanic Station Lenticular Truss Bridge		County Route 667	Neshanic Station	40.5094°N 74.7269°W
Rockafellows Mill Bridge		Rockafellows Mill Road	Rockefellows Mills	40.5207°N 74.8204°W
Fink-Type Truss Bridge (demolished)		Hamden Road/River Road	Hamden	40.6039°N 74.9022°W
Main Street Bridge (Clinton, New Jersey)		Main Street	Clinton	40.6360°N 74.9121°W
Union Forge Bridge		Taylor Steelworkers Historic Greenway Trail	High Bridge	40.6692°N 74.8875°W
Ken Lockwood Gorge Bridge		Columbia Trail	Ken Lockwood Gorge	40.6976°N 74.8724°W
Hoffman's Crossing Road Bridge		Hoffman's Crossing Road	Hoffmans	40.7071°N 74.8611°W
Main Street Bridge (Califon, New Jersey)		Main Street; County Route 512	Califon	40.7206°N 74.8376°W
Vernoy Road Bridge		Vernoy Road	Tewksbury Township	40.7423°N 74.8239°W
Middle Valley Road Bridge		Middle Valley Road	Middle Valley	40.7613°N 74.8213°W
