= Donald and Morris Goodkind Bridges =

Parallel bridges crossing the Raritan River in Middlesex County, New Jersey, USA

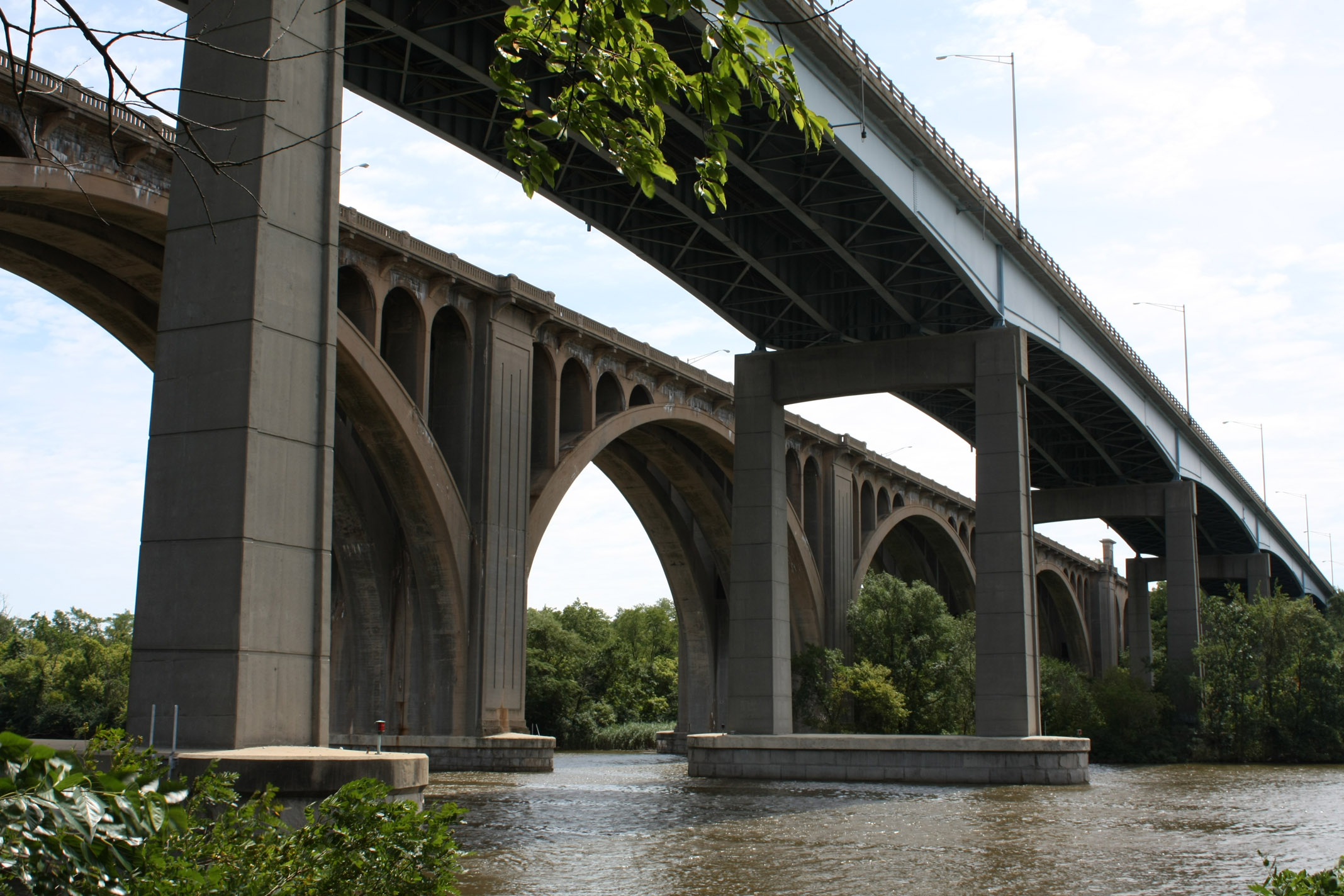
- Donald (front) and Morris (back) Goodkind bridges
- Coordinates: 40.492623°N 74.413124°W
- Carries: US 1 Bicycles and pedestrians
- Crosses: Raritan River
- Locale: New Brunswick and Edison, Middlesex County, New Jersey
- Other name: College Bridge
- Named for: Morris Goodkind, Chief Bridge Engineer and designer Donald Goodkind, son of Morris and designer of steel bridge
- Maintained by: NJDOT
- NJ Bridge ID: NJ 1203150
- Preceded by: Albany Street Bridge
- Followed by: Basilone Bridge

Characteristics
- Design: Open spandrel deck arch
- Material: Reinforced concrete (Morris); Steel (Donald)
- Total length: 1,902 feet (580 m)
- Width: 49.9 feet (15.2 m)
- Longest span: 202.1 feet (61.6 m)
- No. of spans: 15
- Clearance below: 100 feet (30 m)

History
- Architect: Morris Goodkind
- Designer: Morris Goodkind
- Constructed by: Parker and Graham Inc.
- Opened: 1929 (Morris); 1976 (Donald)

Statistics
- Daily traffic: 55,658 (2013)

Location
- Interactive map of Donald and Morris Goodkind Bridges

The Donald and Morris Goodkind Bridges are a pair of bridges on U.S. Route 1 in the U.S. state of New Jersey. The bridges cross the Raritan River, connecting Edison on the north bank with New Brunswick on the south.

== History ==
What is now the northbound span, a concrete arch bridge, is named after its designer, New Jersey Highway Department engineer Morris Goodkind. This span was completed in 1929 and reflects the Art Deco styling of the time. Along both sides of the bridge, there are historical plaques that read of the site's significance to both the Lenape Indians and the American colonists.

Originally named the College Bridge, it was renamed the Morris Goodkind Bridge on April 25, 1969.

Morris had a son, Donald, who also became an architect and engineer for the New Jersey Department of Transportation. Donald designed the southbound bridge, a steel span bridge built in 1974. With this, the original span was closed for a renovation, when it reopened in 1975, it had been converted to serving northbound traffic.

In 2004, the southbound span was renamed the Donald Goodkind Bridge, in honor of its creator.

In 2024, the New Jersey Department of Transportation (DOT) announced plans to spend $110 million on a restoration project to address structural deficiencies and congestion of the 95 year old Morris Goodkind Bridge. The project is expected to begin in 2025 and be completed in fall 2028. Proposed improvements include widening the south side of the bridge to add an auxiliary lane, narrowing the shoulders, and replacing the guardrails. It would also involve partial demolition and reconstruction of the structure.

== In popular culture ==
In the 1983 musical film Eddie and the Cruisers, fictional rock band leader Eddie Wilson was believed to have drowned when his 1957 Chevrolet Bel Air went off the Morris Goodkind Bridge on March 15, 1964.

In The Sopranos episode "Nobody Knows Anything," Detective Vin Makazian leaps to his death from the Donald Goodkind Bridge.

== See also ==
- List of crossings of the Raritan River
