= Hoffman's Crossing Road Bridge =

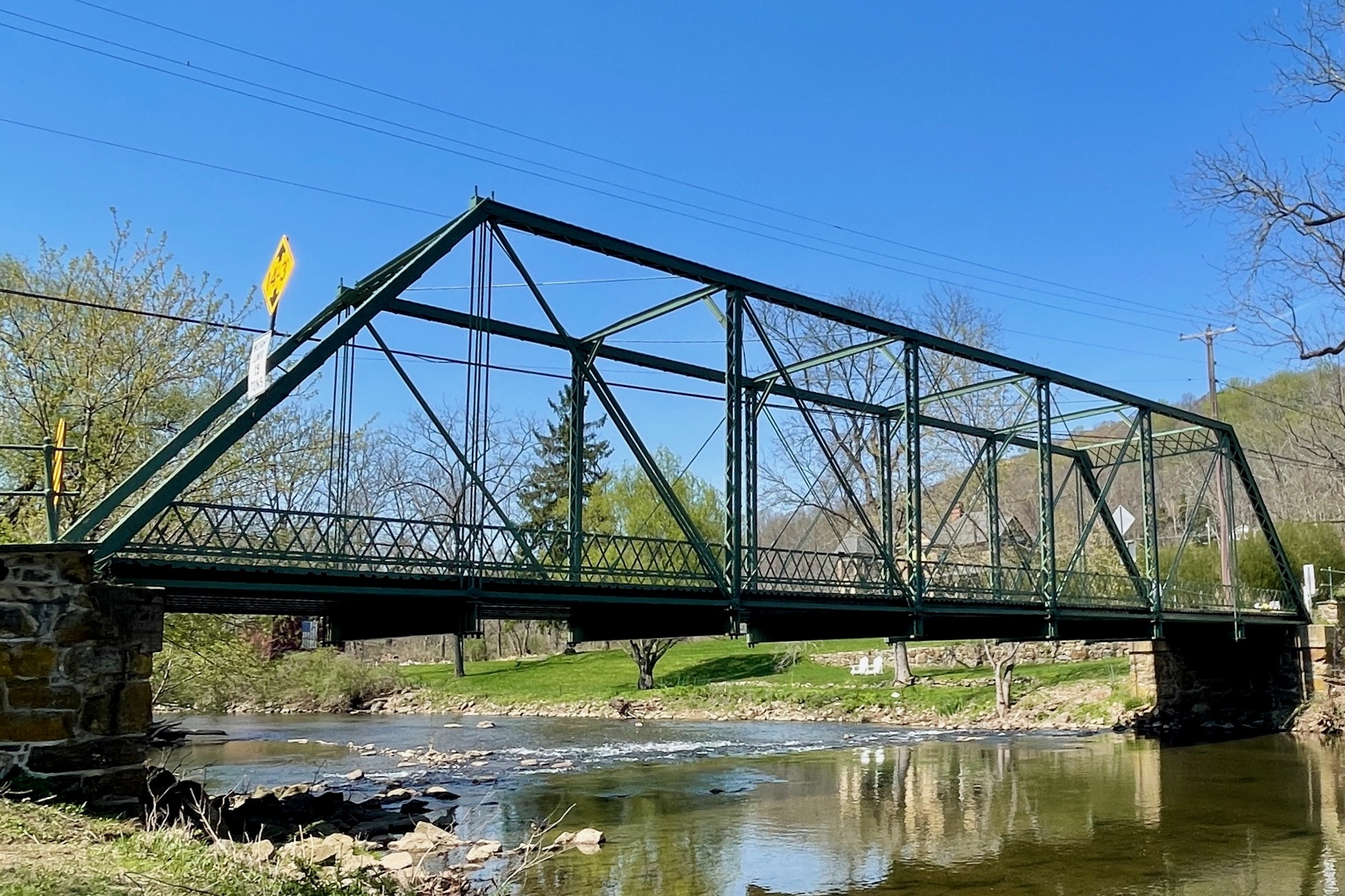
- Coordinates: 40°42′25.5″N 74°51′40.0″W
- Carries: Hoffman's Crossing Road
- Crosses: South Branch Raritan River
- Locale: Hoffmans, New Jersey

Characteristics
- Total length: 103 feet (31 m)
- Width: 16.2 feet (4.9 m)

History
- Opened: 1898

New Jersey Register of Historic Places
- Type: Certification of Eligibility
- Designated: February 11, 1999
- Reference no.: 3773

The Hoffman's Crossing Road Bridge is a Pratt thru truss bridge that carries Hoffman's Crossing Road across the South Branch Raritan River in the Hoffmans section of Lebanon Township in Hunterdon County, New Jersey. It was built in 1898 by Tippett and Wood of Phillipsburg. The bridge is 103 feet (31 m) long and 16.2 feet (4.9 m) wide. It was added to the New Jersey Register of Historic Places on February 11, 1999.

== See also ==
- List of crossings of the Raritan River
