= Albany Street Bridge =

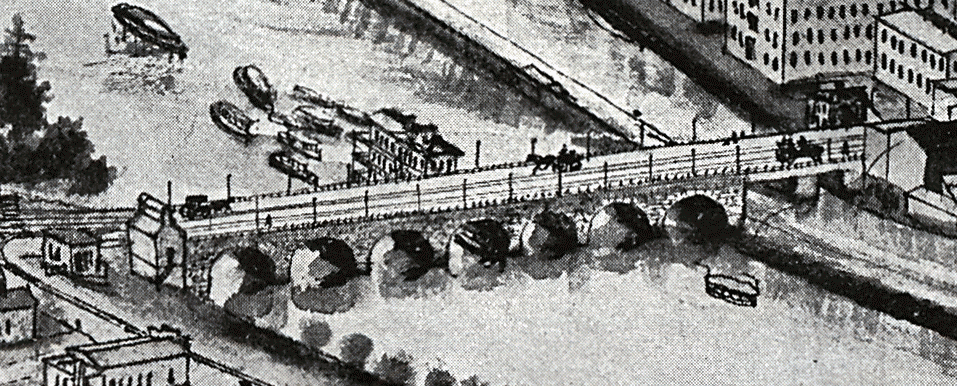
- The bridge in 1910
- Coordinates: 40°29′51″N 74°26′16″W
- Carries: Route 27
- Crosses: Raritan River
- Locale: New Brunswick and Highland Park, Middlesex County, New Jersey
- Maintained by: NJDOT

Characteristics
- Design: Arch
- Material: Stone
- Total length: 595.2 feet (181.4 m)
- Width: 41 feet (12 m)
- Clearance above: 21.3 feet (6.5 m)

History
- Opened: 1887

The Albany Street Bridge is a bridge that carries Route 27 in the U.S. state of New Jersey spanning the Raritan River. The bridge connects Highland Park on the east with New Brunswick on the west. The bridge is so named because Route 27 in New Brunswick, from the Raritan River to Easton Avenue, is known locally as Albany Street.

== History ==
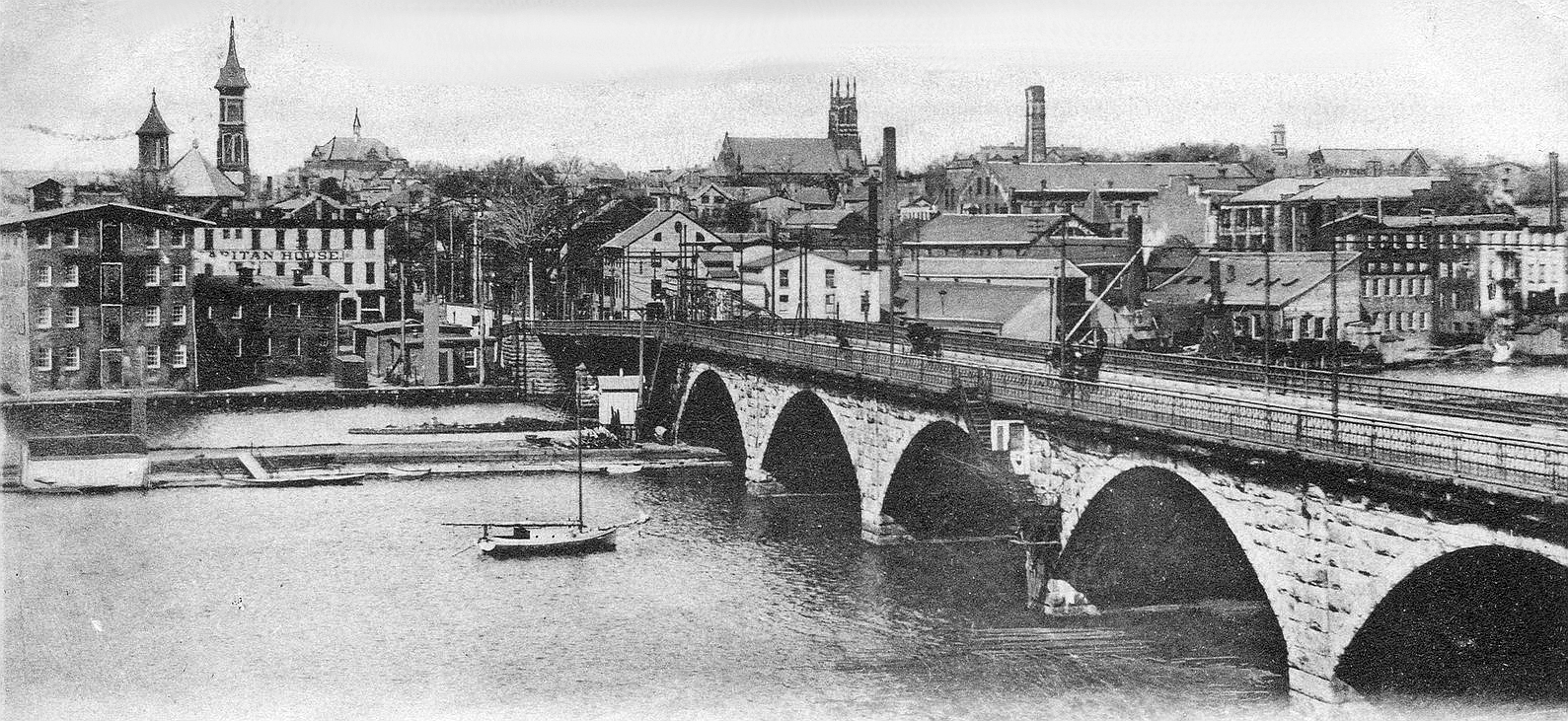
Albany Street Bridge in 1903.

The low stone arch bridge was built in 1887.

In 1915, the bridge became become part of the transcontinental Lincoln Highway.

The bridge was widened in 1925.

In 1927, the bridge became part of route 27.

The bridge received modifications such as the chain link fencing in the 1980s. From the bridge's centennial in 1987 until 1991, a major renovation created a drastic traffic bottleneck in the area.

From the road, the appearance of the bridge is very modern. The best views of this historic arch bridge are from the banks of the Raritan River and from the nearby Northeast Corridor Raritan River Bridge.

== See also ==
- List of crossings of the Raritan River
- Route of the Lincoln Highway
