= Main Street Bridge (Califon, New Jersey) =

- U.S. Historic district – Contributing property
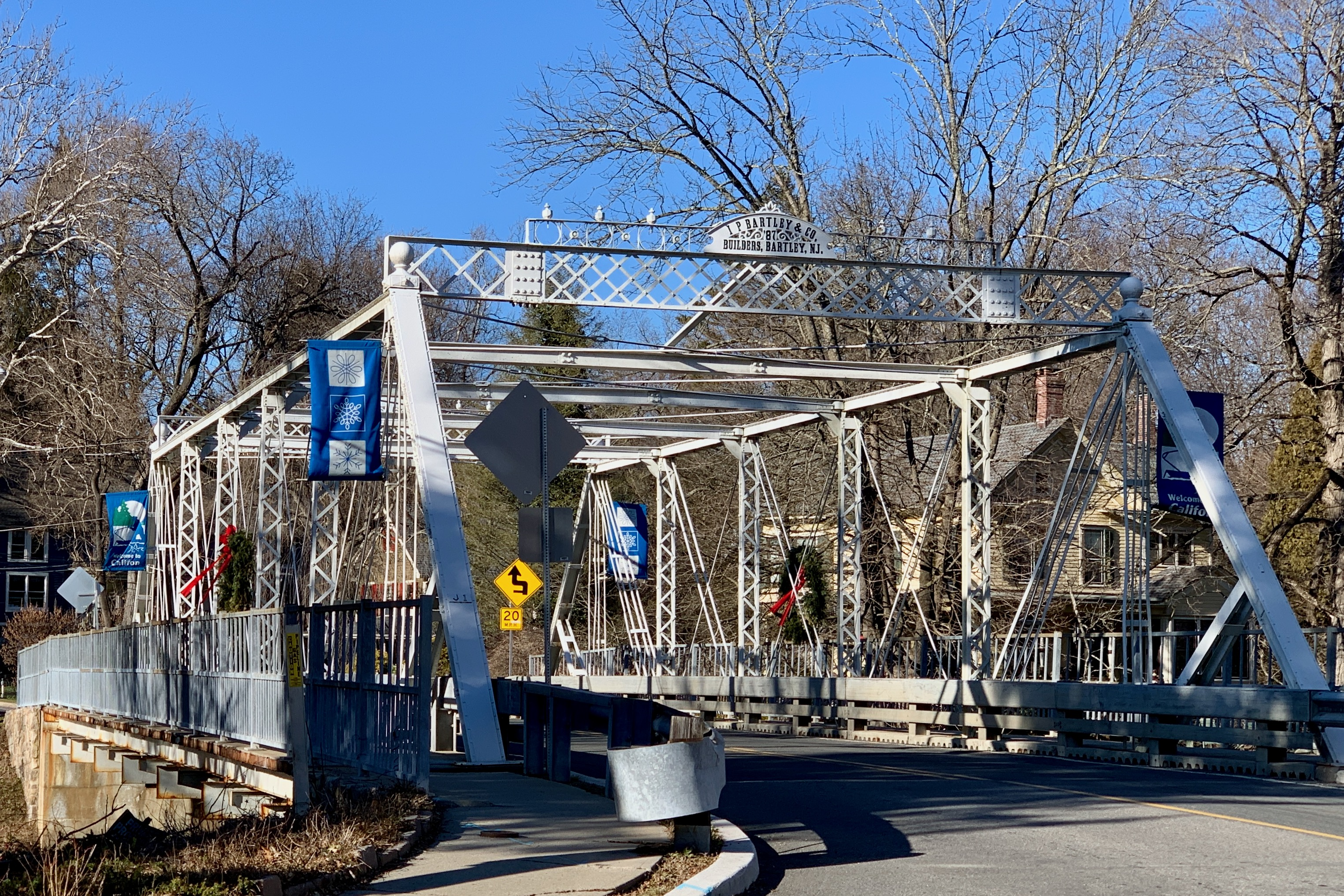
- Califon Bridge

- Location within Hunterdon County, New Jersey Location within New Jersey Location within the United States
- Location: Main Street; Califon, New Jersey
- Coordinates: 40°43′14″N 74°50′15.5″W
- Part of: Califon Historic District (ID76001157)
- Designated CP: October 14, 1976

The Main Street Bridge, historically known as the Califon Bridge, is a Pratt thru truss bridge that carries Main Street (County Route 512) over the South Branch Raritan River in Califon, Hunterdon County, New Jersey. The bridge was added to the National Register of Historic Places on October 14, 1976, as part of the Califon Historic District.

== History ==
The iron truss bridge was constructed in 1887 by I. P. Bartley & Co. of Mount Olive Township in Morris County. In 1985, the bridge was rehabilitated and widened by converting to a stringer bridge design using steel beams, while maintaining the historic original trusses. It is now 100 feet (30 m) long and 24 feet (7.3 m) wide.

== Gallery ==
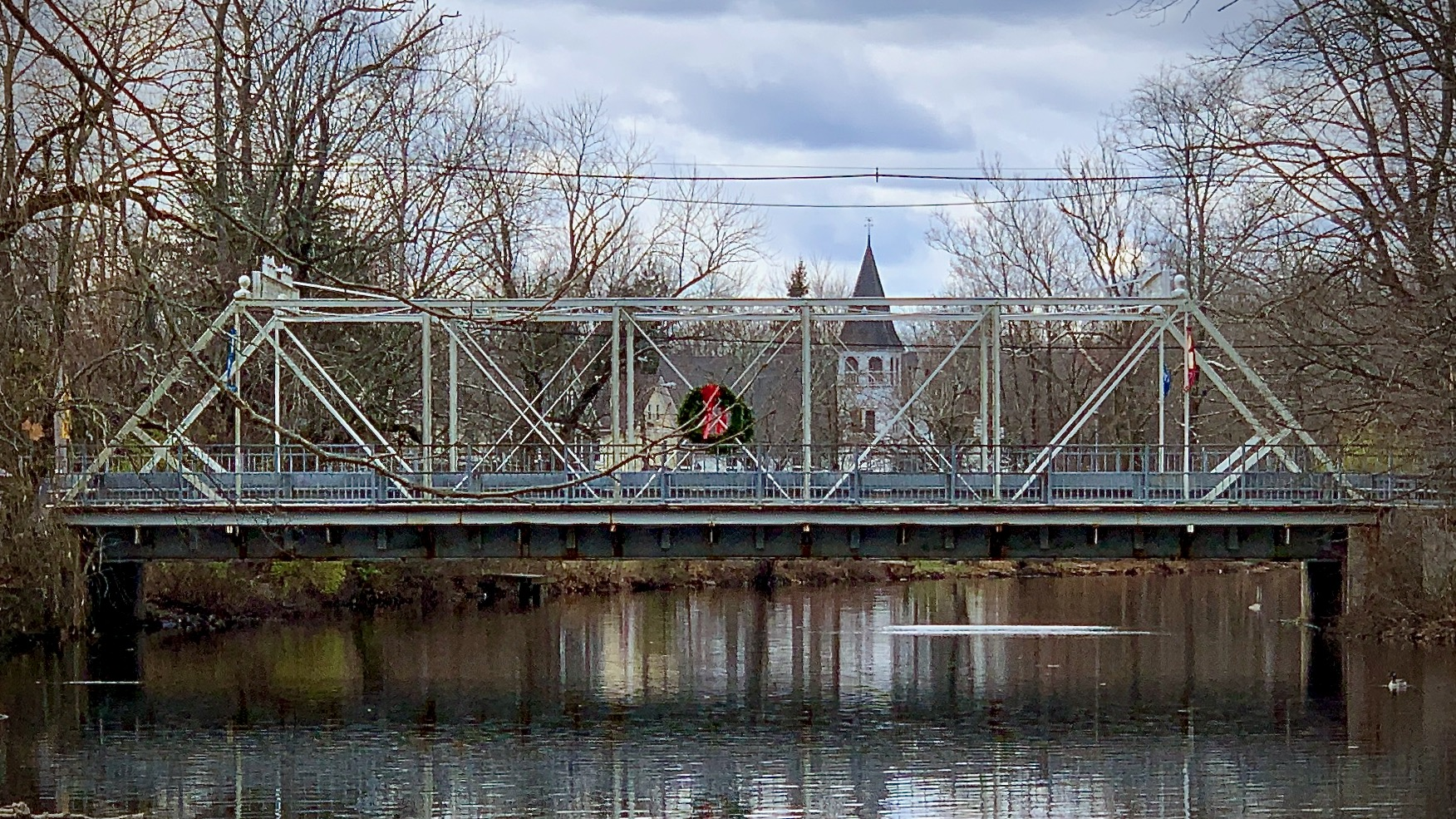
Crossing the South Branch Raritan River

== See also ==
- List of bridges documented by the Historic American Engineering Record in New Jersey
- List of bridges on the National Register of Historic Places in New Jersey
- List of crossings of the Raritan River
