= Hoffmans, New Jersey =

Populated place in Hunterdon County, New Jersey, US

- Unincorporated community
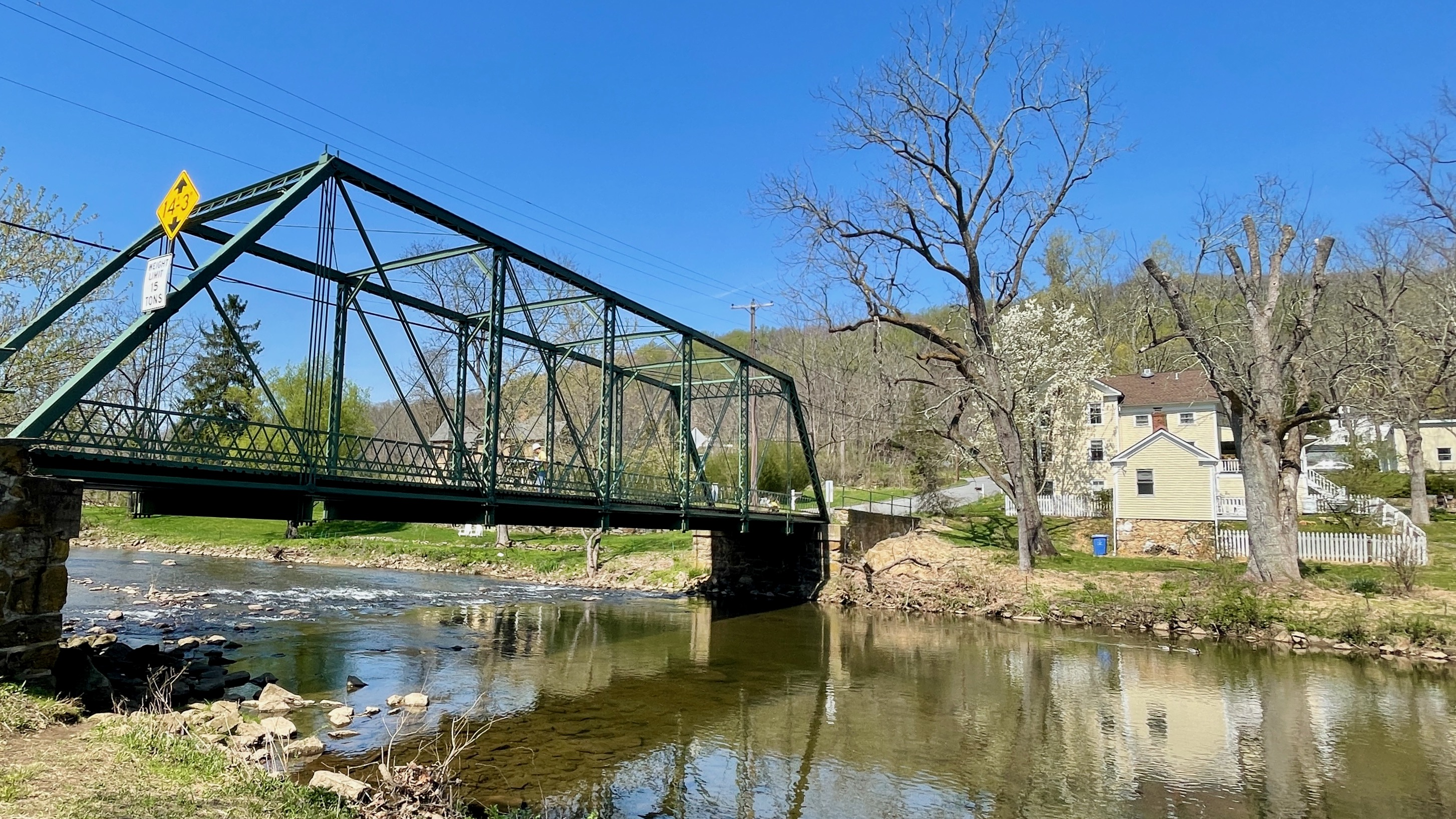
- Houses by Hoffman's Crossing Road Bridge and the South Branch Raritan River

- Location within Hunterdon County, New Jersey Location within New Jersey Location within the United States
- Coordinates: 40°42′21″N 74°51′37″W
- Country: United States
- State: New Jersey
- County: Hunterdon
- Township: Lebanon
- Named for: Issac H. Hoffman
- Elevation: 469 ft (143 m)
- GNIS feature ID: 877155

Hoffmans, also known as Hoffman's Crossing, is an unincorporated community located along Hoffman's Crossing Road and the South Branch Raritan River within Lebanon Township in Hunterdon County, New Jersey. It is about 1.5 miles (2.4 km) from Califon. The main road in the community is County Route 513 (High Bridge-Califon Road). The Hunterdon County Educational Services Commission (HCESC) has a campus here.

== History ==
The community is named after Issac H. Hoffman (1862–1959), a local farmer, banker and businessman, who operated a sawmill and peach basket factory here.

In 1876, the High Bridge Branch of the Central Railroad of New Jersey (CNJ) starts operation through the community.

== Points of interest ==
The Columbia Trail passes through the community and connects to the nearby Ken Lockwood Gorge.

The Hoffman's Crossing Road Bridge, a Pratt thru truss bridge built in 1898, was added to the New Jersey Register of Historic Places on February 11, 1999.

The Hunterdon Art Museum offers Earth Based Arts and Nature-Themed Programs at the Hoffman's Crossing Campus of HCESC.
