= Raritan River Bridge =

NEC Raritan River Bridge
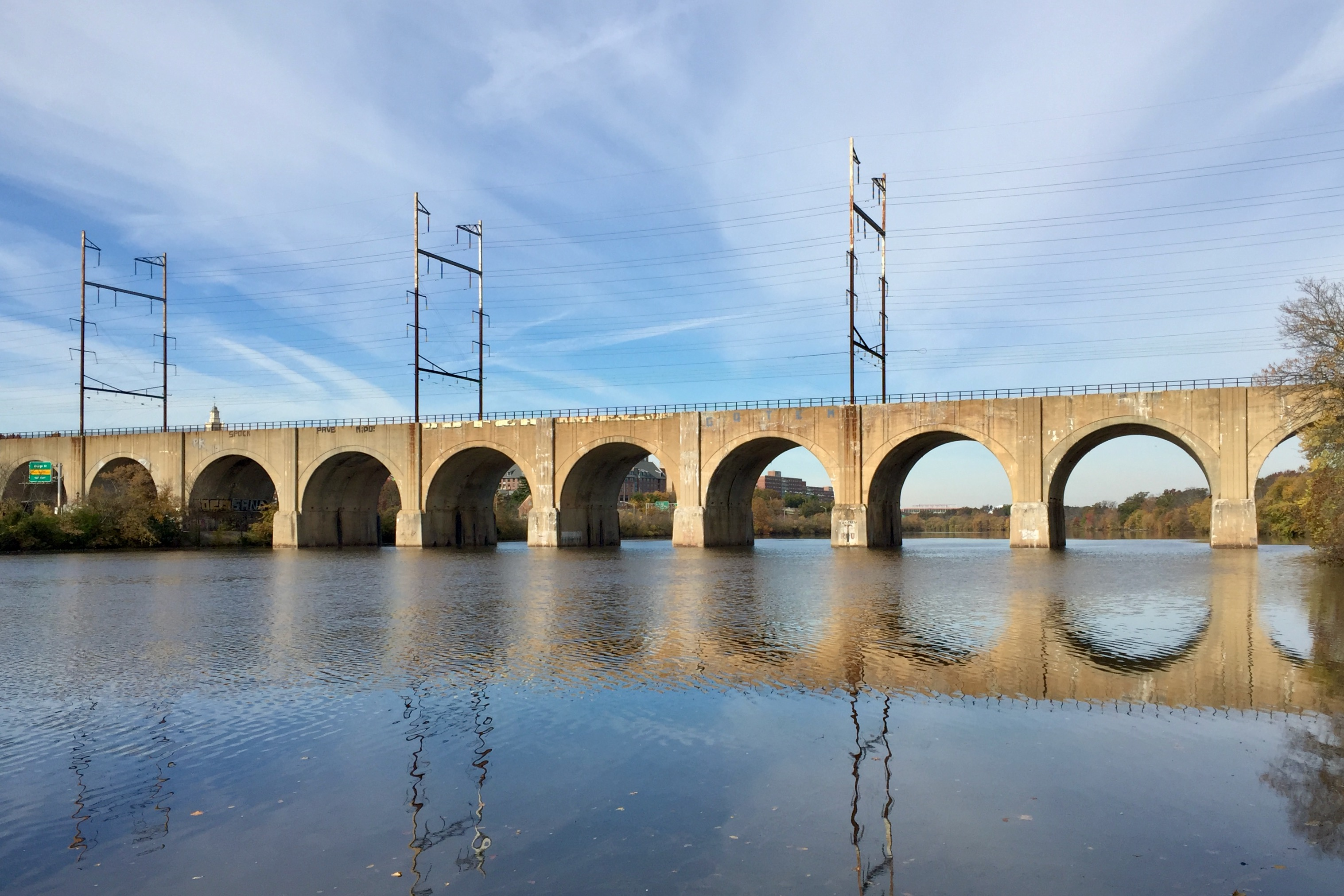
- Coordinates: 40°30′04″N 74°26′28″W
- Carries: Northeast Corridor
- Crosses: Raritan River
- Locale: New Brunswick and Highland Park, Middlesex County, New Jersey
- Owner: Amtrak

Characteristics
- Design: Closed-spandrel arch
- Material: Stone, concrete
- Total length: 1,428 feet (435 m)
- No. of spans: 21

Rail characteristics
- No. of tracks: 4
- Track gauge: 4 ft 8 1/2 in (1,435 mm) standard gauge

History
- Construction end: 1903

Location
- Interactive map of NEC Raritan River Bridge

The Raritan River Bridge is a rail bridge over the Raritan River, in New Brunswick and Highland Park in Middlesex County, New Jersey, U.S. The arch bridge carries the Northeast Corridor (NEC) at MP 30.92. It is owned by Amtrak, and New Jersey Transit's Northeast Corridor Line also uses this bridge. It also crosses over New Jersey Route 18.

The bridge was constructed in 1903 by the Pennsylvania Railroad (PRR). It consists of 21 spans of stone arches, the clear spans varying from 51 feet to 72 feet each, and has a total length of 1,428 feet (435 m). The line was electrified by 1933 and between 1948 and 1950 the bridge was encased in concrete.

The bridge was documented by the Historic American Engineering Record in 1977. It is contributing property of the unlisted Pennsylvania Railroad New York to Philadelphia Historic District (ID#4568), designated in 2002 by the New Jersey State Historic Preservation Office.

== Earlier bridges ==
The first crossing of the Raritan at this point was wooden bridge on masonry substructure, constructed in 1838 by the United New Jersey Railroad and Canal Company. It was a 1,577 feet (481 m) long double-deck Howe truss bridge with a highway on the lower deck. The 146 feet (45 m)-foot long draw span was renewed in 1872.

In 1877 work began on the replacement with the intention to build a double-track iron structure of seven iron fixed deck-spans having three trusses each with stone-arch approaches. While construction was underway this bridge was entirely destroyed by fire on March 9, 1878. Traffic was resumed over a temporary structure five days later.

In 1896, the superstructure was again renewed with five deck truss-spans, each 147 feet (45 m) long, and one drawspan over the canal, all for two tracks.

== Literary significance ==
In the Pulitzer Prize winning novel The Brief Wondrous Life of Oscar Wao by Junot Díaz, the title character becomes so frustrated and despondent over the futility of his romantic pursuits that he gets drunk, walks out onto the Raritan River railroad bridge, and attempts suicide by jumping off, surviving only because he lands in the shrubs on a garden divider on Route 18. Later he regretfully explains to his friend Yunior, "It was foolish. Ill-advised."

== Gallery ==
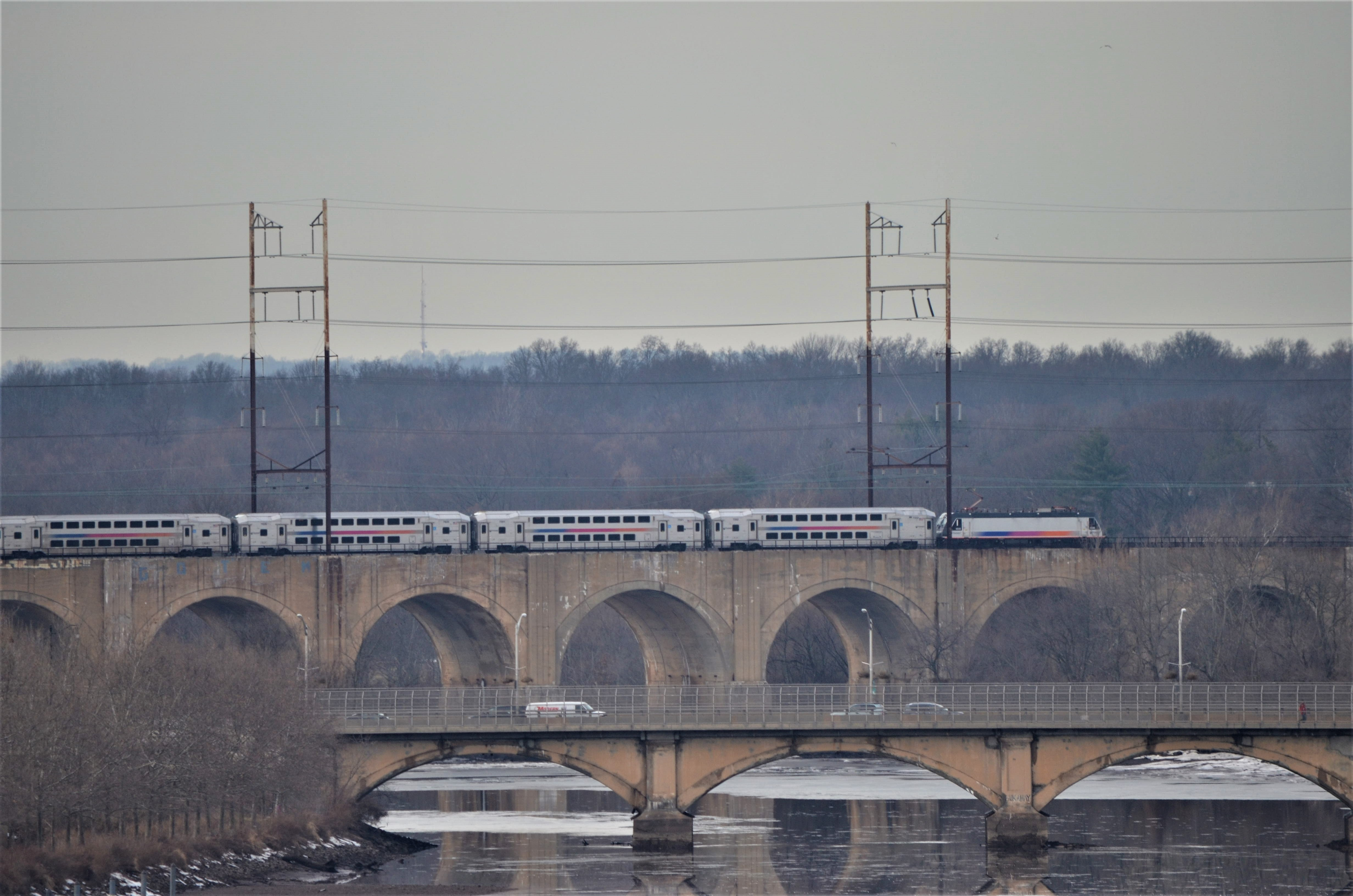
New Jersey Transit Northeast Corridor train on the bridge

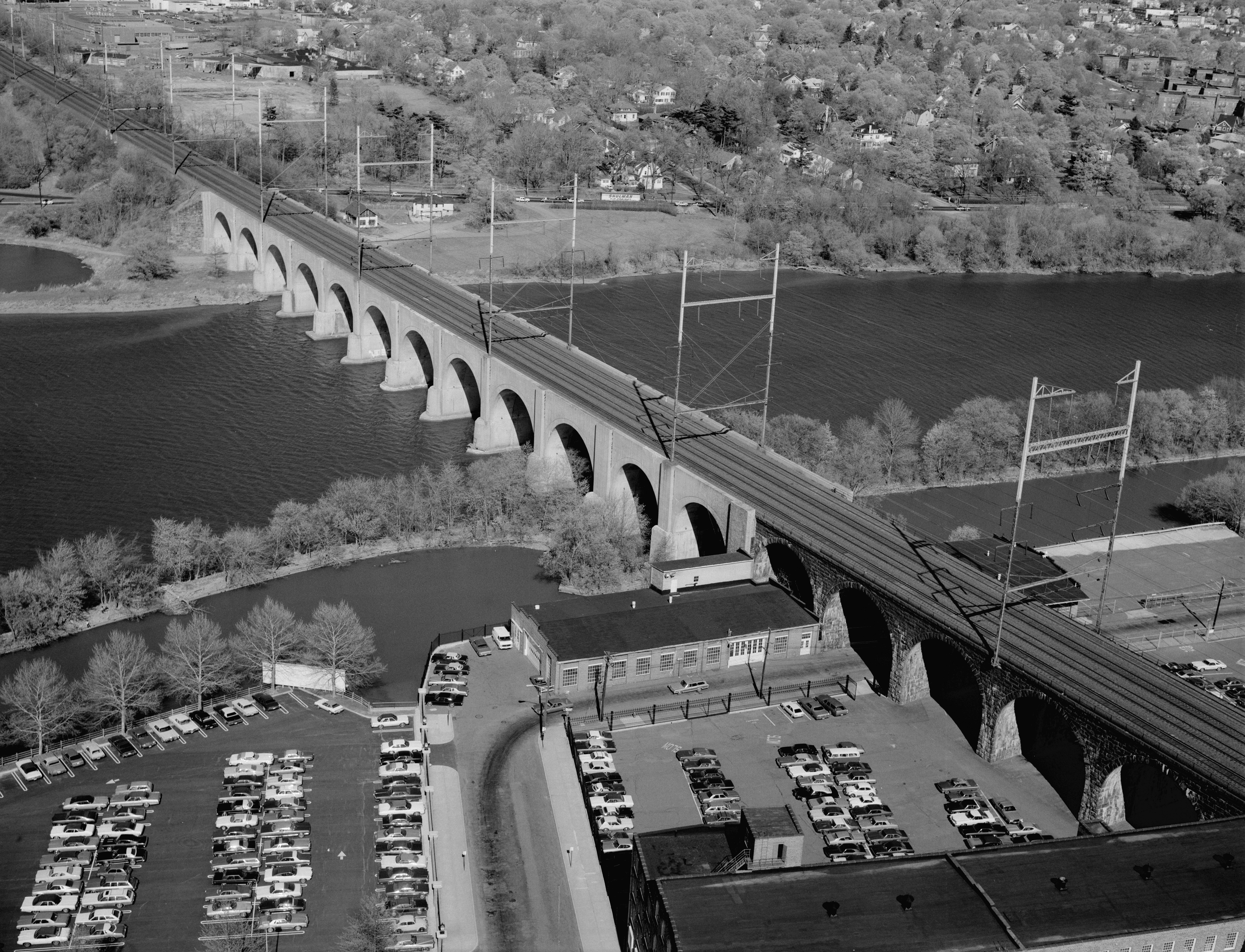
HAER view from 1977

== See also ==
- List of crossings of the Raritan River
- List of NJT movable bridges
- County Yard
- List of bridges documented by the Historic American Engineering Record in New Jersey
- List of Northeast Corridor infrastructure
