= Basilone Memorial Bridge =

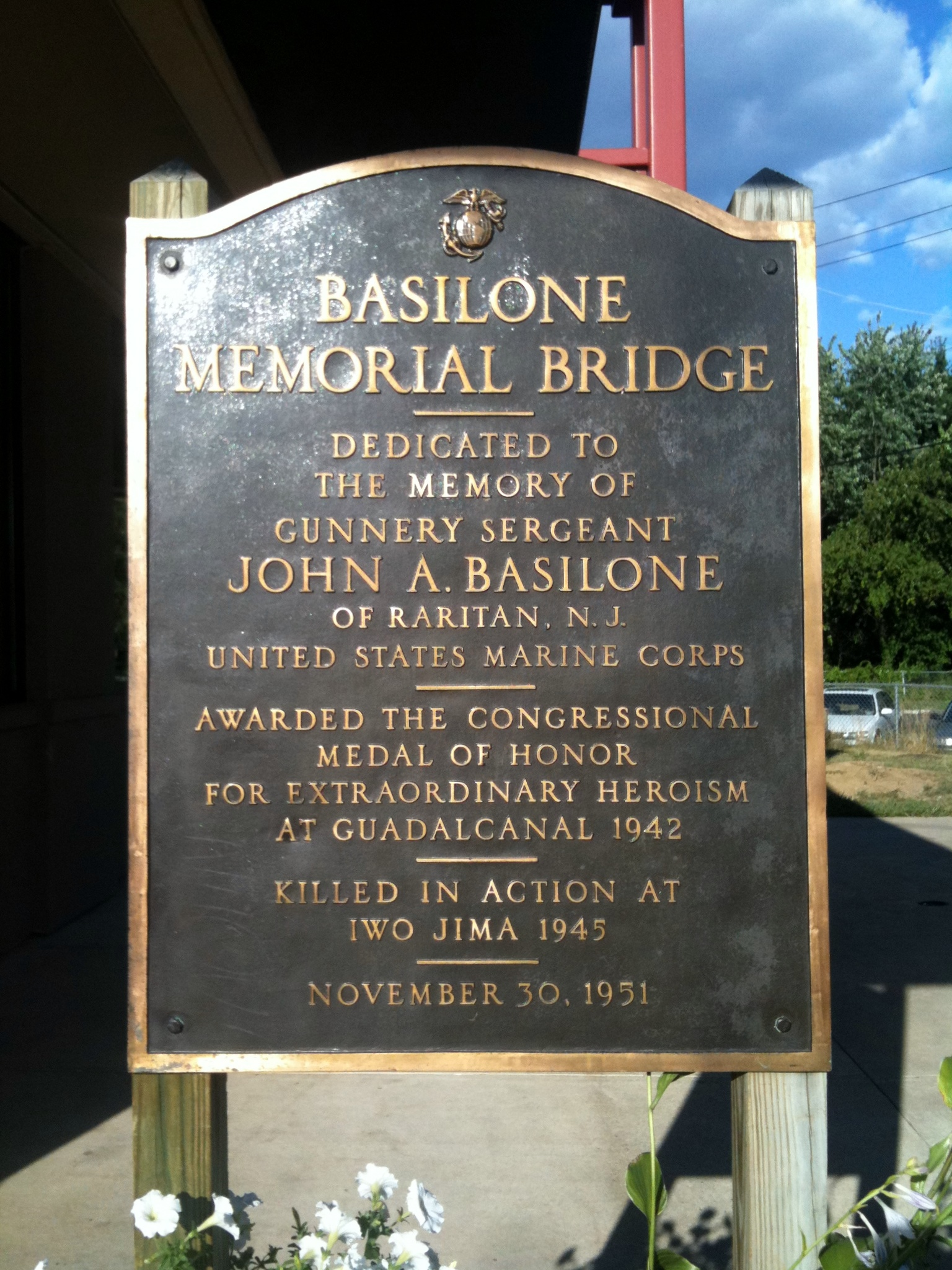
- Coordinates: 40.4884°N 74.3963°W
- Carries: 12 lanes of I-95 / N.J. Turnpike
- Crosses: Raritan River
- Locale: New Brunswick and Edison, Middlesex County, New Jersey
- Other name: Basilone Bridge
- Maintained by: New Jersey Turnpike Authority

History
- Opened: 1951

Location
- Interactive map of Basilone Memorial Bridge

The Basilone Memorial Bridge is a bridge on the New Jersey Turnpike (Interstate 95) in the U.S. state of New Jersey spanning the Raritan River. The bridge connects Edison on the north with New Brunswick on the south.

The bridge, which opened along with the Turnpike in November 1951, is named for John Basilone, a World War II recipient of the Medal of Honor who grew up in nearby Raritan, New Jersey. The New Jersey Turnpike Authority began a $172 million reconstruction project in January 2022.

Memorials for the bridge can be found at both the northbound Joyce Kilmer Service Area and southbound Thomas Edison Service Area.

== See also ==
- List of crossings of the Raritan River
