= Truesdel Peck Calkins =

First President of Hofstra University (1877–1942)

1st President of Hofstra University
- In office July 1, 1939 – June 9, 1942
- Succeeded by: Howard S. Brower (interim)

Personal details
- Born: October 7, 1877 Brownville, New York, United States
- Died: June 9, 1942 (aged 64) Nassau Hospital, Mineola, New York, United States
- Education: Ives Seminary, Cazenovia Seminary, Hudson River Institute
- Alma mater: Ohio Northern University (BA) (M.S.), (PedD)

John Truesdel Peck Calkins (October 7, 1877 - June 9, 1942) was an American educator and academic administrator who served as the first President of Hofstra University from 1939 until his death from a heart attack in 1942.

Prior to being Hofstra's president, Calkins had served as director of New York University's Bureau of Appointments and as a professor of education. His directorship was instrumental of the founding of the university, and he was named chairman of the board of trustees until his election to the presidency. He had also held a position as principal of the East Springfield Academy, as well as various superintendent positions, including the village of Hempstead in which Hofstra is situated.

== Pre-Presidency ==
Before becoming president of what was then known as Hofstra College, Calkins had played a large role serving as the chair of the building committee. which was the lead in executing the building of the campus in general. The school had initially started by teaching out of Hempstead High School, but seeing a new space needed, Calkins was the chair of the building committee in overseeing part of the construction of Brower Hall, a new building for the campus after Hofstra Hall was accommodated to be fit for students. This also included the acquisition off land of California Avenue "for recreational and athletic purposes", for what spott is currently housed by the James Shuart Stadium.

In 1937, Calkins was named as the Hofstra chair of the board of trustees.

== Presidency ==
On July 1, 1939, Hofstra had officially split from New York University becoming Hofstra College. In announcing the proposed separation, Calkins stated that the financial means were entirely independent from NYU and the only relationship they truly had was of an academic manner.

Preceded by Position Established	President of Hofstra University; 1939–1942	Succeeded by John Cranford Adams
