= Howard S. Brower =

American Academic Administrator

Howard Brower

2nd President of Hofstra University
- In office 1942 – August 31, 1944
- Preceded by: Truesdel Peck Calkins
- Succeeded by: John Cranford Adams

Personal details
- Born: March 12, 1884 Hempstead, New York
- Died: March 4, 1968 (aged 83) Palm Beach, Florida
- Children: 2

Howard Stanley Brower (March 12, 1884 – March 4, 1968) was the second President of Hofstra University after the death of Truesdel Peck Calkins. Brower was co-executor of the estate of the Hofstra's, which led to the creation of the University. Although Brower had served as president of Hofstra he had never attended college himself.

Brower also served as Mayor of Hempstead, and President of numerous companies including Nassau Lumber Company, Brower Lumber Company, and the Reserve Supply Corporation of Nassau. He also founded the Rotary Club of Hempstead and the West Hempstead National Bank.

Preceded by Truesdel Peck Calkins	President of Hofstra University; 1942–1944	Succeeded by John Cranford Adams
