= Hofstra (surname) =

Hofstra is a Dutch surname. It may refer to:

- David Hofstra (born 1953), American jazz musician
- Henk Hofstra (1904–1999), Dutch politician
- Pieter Hofstra (1946–2025), Dutch politician
- Rick Hofstra (born 1977), Dutch darts player
- William S. Hofstra (1861–1932), American lumber entrepreneur and philanthropist; namesake of Hofstra University in New York

== See also ==
- Hofstra University
