= Hofstra University Arboretum =

Arboretum in Hempstead, New York, U.S.

Coordinates: 40.7122°N 73.5995°W

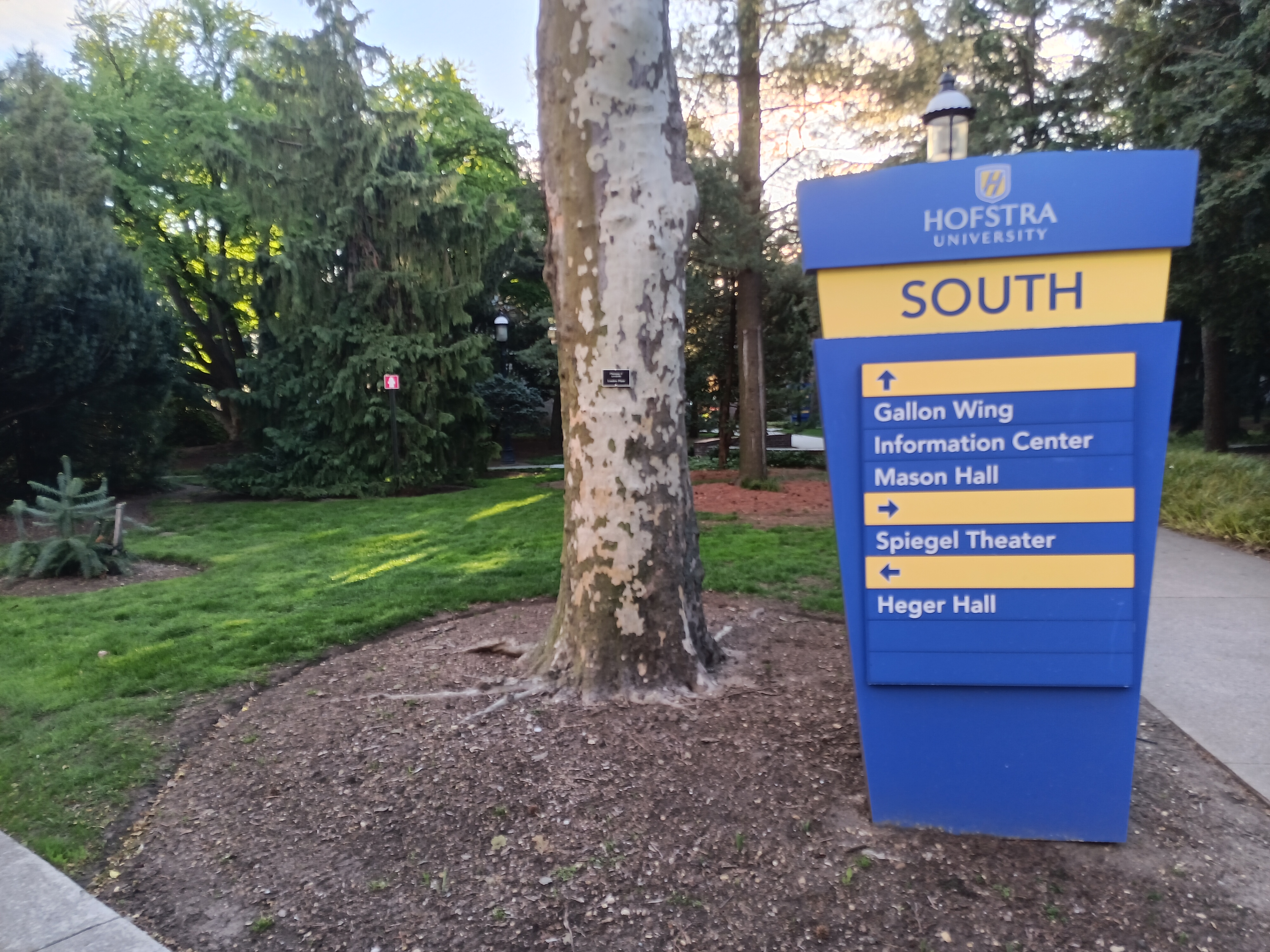
- Arboretum throughout the campus.
- Interactive map of Hofstra University Arboretum

The Hofstra University Arboretum (240 acres (97 ha)) is an arboretum located across the Hofstra University campus, in Hempstead, New York. Hofstra's campus is a member of the American Public Gardens Association, and is one of 430 arboreta in the United States.

The Hofstra campus contains more than 12,000 evergreen and deciduous trees, representing 625 species and varieties of woody plants. The arboretum includes both native and exotic trees. A bird sanctuary has also been developed on two acres of land, serving as an educational prototype for the state of New York.

== Gallery ==
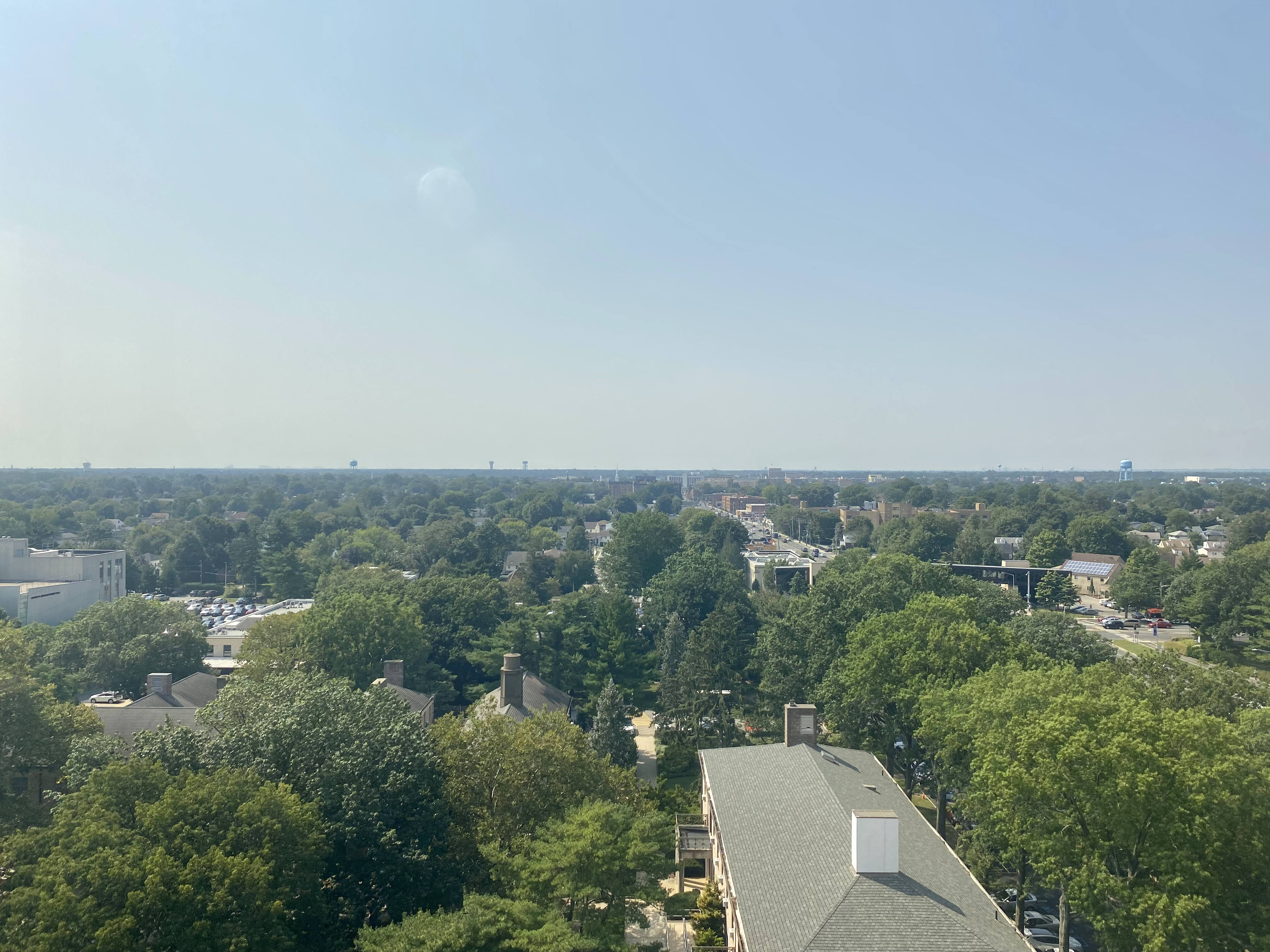
The Arboretum (near) inside the south side of campus with Hempstead Plains (far)

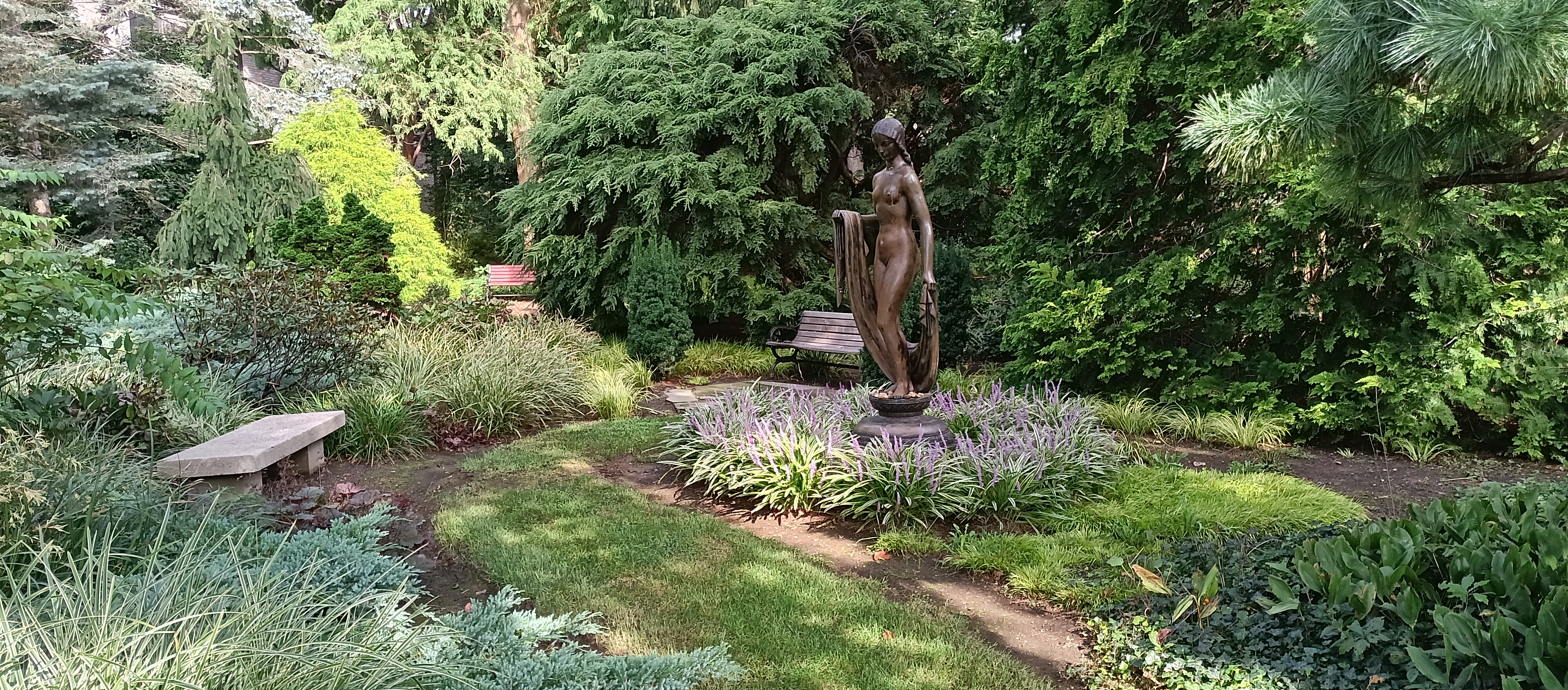
A sitting area in the Arboretum with a statue

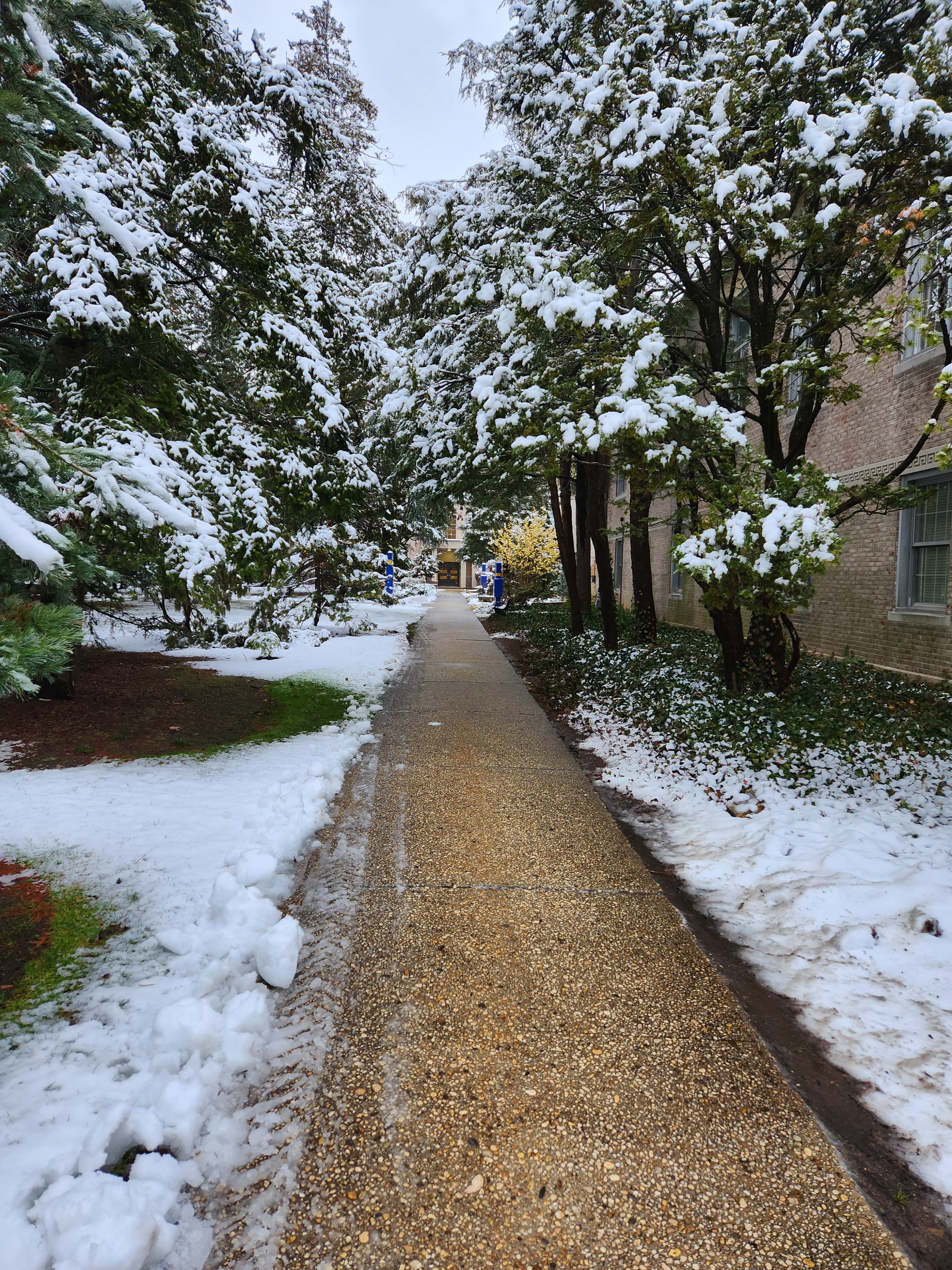
The Arboretum in winter

== See also ==
- List of botanical gardens and arboretums in the United States
