= Suburban Technical School =

Coordinates: 40°42′28″N 73°37′46″W

Suburban Technical School was a for-profit college in Hempstead, New York, United States.

== Programs Offered ==
Upon completion, students are able to work in entry-level health care positions.

They originally offered an Electronic Technology Diploma for a 900 hrs course.

== Accreditation ==
Suburban Technical School was accredited by the Accrediting Commission of Career Schools and Colleges of Technology to award diplomas. As of September 2012, the school is no longer open.
