= James H. Marshall =

American academic administrator

5th President of Hofstra University
- In office September 1, 1972 – June 20, 1973
- Preceded by: Clifford Lee Lord
- Succeeded by: Robert L. Payton

Personal details
- Born: July 21, 1931 New York City, New York
- Died: December 16, 2007 (aged 76)
- Education: Hofstra University (BA)

James Harper Marshall (July 21, 1931 – December 16, 2007) was an American administrator who served as the 5th president of Hofstra University from 1972 to 1973.

== Administrative career ==
Marshall attained the post of President of Hofstra University following the sudden relievement of Clifford Lee Lord so that he would become chancellor. The controversy had been so much that a trustee had resigned his post on the Board due to Marhsall's "...unspecific capabilities...as president and chief executive". Marshall's tenure was then riddled with other woes, such as a looming $1 million deficit in June 1972, as Hofstra' endowment was only $7 million at the time.

However, Marshall's tenure was ultimately remembered for the 1973 raid that was conducted on Hofstra's campus in coordination with the Nassau County Police Department. The university had helped to coordinate the raid with local officials after the police had denied their request to have the students turn themselves over to police voluntarily, and that indictments were already in place for the students. As a result, 28 students were arrested for selling various sorts of narcotics. In response to the aftermath of the raid, Marshall had called Hofstra "hell of a good school" and had denied any knowledge of knowing of the raid before being contacted by the department.

Marshall also made some significant appointments to University Deanships when he appointed Monroe Freedman as the second Dean of Hofstra Law and Harold Lazarus as the Dean for the School of Business.

Marshall had then left the presidency on June 20, 1973.

Preceded by Clifford Lee Lord	President of Hofstra University; 1972–1973	Succeeded by Robert L. Payton
