= Hofstra University =

Private university in Hempstead and Uniondale, New York, US

- Former names: Nassau College – Hofstra Memorial of New York University (1935–1937); Hofstra College (1937–1963)
- Motto: Je maintiendrai (French) (Motto of the House of Orange-Nassau)
- Motto in English: "I will uphold"
- Type: Private research university
- Established: September 23, 1935; 91 years ago
- Accreditation: MSCHE
- Affiliations: NAICU
- Endowment: $955.8 million (2025)
- President: Susan Poser
- Provost: Charles Riordan
- Faculty: 1,320 (493 full-time and 827 part-time) (2024)
- Students: 10,685 (2025)
- Undergraduates: 6,581
- Postgraduates: 4,104 (2,800 graduates, 967 law, and 437 medicine)
- Location: Hempstead, New York, U.S. 40°42′53″N 73°36′2″W
- Campus: 244 acres (99 ha); Large suburb
- Newspaper: The Hofstra Chronicle
- Colors: Blue, white, and gold
- Nickname: Pride
- Sporting affiliations: NCAA Division I FCS – CAA; EIWA
- Mascots: Kate & Willie Pride
- Website: hofstra.edu

Hofstra University is a private research university in Hempstead, New York, United States. It originated in 1935 as an extension of New York University and became an independent college in 1939. Comprising ten schools, including the Zucker School of Medicine and the Maurice A. Deane School of Law, Hofstra has hosted a series of prominent presidential conferences and several United States presidential debates.

== History ==
Presidents of Hofstra University
President	Tenure
Truesdel Peck Calkins	1937–1942
Howard S. Brower (Acting)	1942–1944
John Cranford Adams	1944–1964
Clifford Lee Lord	1964–1972
James H. Marshall	1972–1973
Robert L. Payton	1973–1976
James M. Shuart	1976–2001
Stuart Rabinowitz	2001–2021
Susan Poser	2021–present

The college was founded in 1935 on the estate of namesake William S. Hofstra (1861–1932), a lumber entrepreneur of Dutch ancestry, and his second wife Kate Mason (1854–1933). It began as an extension of New York University (NYU) under the name Nassau College – Hofstra Memorial of New York University. It became the fourth U.S. college or university named after a Dutch American.

The extension had been proposed by a Hempstead resident, Truesdel Peck Calkins, who had been superintendent of schools for Hempstead. In her will, Kate Mason provided the bulk of their property and estate to be used for a charitable, scientific or humanitarian purpose, to be named in honor of her husband. In the spring of 1934, the estate was offered to be converted into a sanitarium for those suffering with polio by the Georgia Warm Springs Foundation, specifically offering to President Franklin Roosevelt, but nothing had materialized from it. Two friends, Howard Brower and James Barnard, were asked to decide what to do with the estate. Calkins remarked to Brower that he had been looking for a site to start an institution of higher education, and the three men agreed it would be an appropriate use of the estate. Calkins approached the administration at New York University, and they expressed interest.

The college was founded as a coeducational, commuter institution with day and evening classes. The first day of classes at Nassau-Hofstra Memorial College was September 23, 1935, with 150 students enrolled and an equal divide between men and women. The first class of students was made up of 159 day and 621 evening students. The tuition fee for the year was $375. The college obtained provisional charter status, and its official name was changed to Hofstra College on January 16, 1937.

Hofstra College separated from New York University on July 1, 1939, and was granted an absolute charter on February 16, 1940. In 1950, Calkins Gymnasium was the site of the first Shakespeare Festival. It was performed on a five-sixths-sized replica of the Globe Theatre. The festival is now performed on the Globe Stage, the most accurate Globe Theatre replica in the United States.

In 1968, a three-bank Aeolian pipe organ was donated to Hofstra by John T. Ricks and Jane Ricks King, in the name of their late parents, Mr. and Mrs. Jesse Ricks. The organ was originally located in the former Ricks estate, Chanticlare, in Flower Hill, New York. Jesse Ricks was the former president and chairman of Union Carbide, and Mrs. Ricks was a volunteer church organist who often held organ performances at the estate for friends on Sundays. The organ was scheduled to be installed in the Hofstra Playhouse the following fall, and enabled organ music majors at Hofstra to practice on-campus – as opposed to at the nearby Episcopal Cathedral of the Incarnation.

Hofstra Stadium served as the site of the first-ever NCAA Division I Men's Lacrosse Championship game in 1971.

In October 2011, the Commission on Presidential Debates announced it had chosen Hofstra for its second 2012 presidential debate on October 16, 2012, the "town hall" debate (between Barack Obama and Mitt Romney). Hofstra University hosted the first 2016 presidential debate between Donald Trump and Hillary Clinton on September 26, 2016.

=== Dutch heritage ===
Hofstra's flag

The university's founder, William S. Hofstra, was proud of his Dutch roots and that is reflected throughout Hofstra University's campus. It is one of several American universities named after Dutch Americans, also including Rutgers University for Henry Rutgers and Vanderbilt University for Cornelius Vanderbilt.

Hofstra's original logo was a seal created by professor of art Constant van de Wall in 1937. The insignia was derived from the official seal of the reigning house of the Netherlands, the House of Orange-Nassau. Used with the permission of the monarch of the Netherlands, the seal also included the Dutch national motto Je Maintiendrai, meaning "I stand steadfast" in French. Hofstra's flag is modeled after the Netherlands' Prince's Flag, and its orange,-white-and-blue pattern was altered to feature the school's colors of gold and navy blue. In 1939, the Dutch ambassador to the United States left behind a flag of the Netherlands before he returned to his country for World War II, which influenced Hofstra's school colors, university seal and coat of arms.

Hofstra also pays homage to its Dutch heritage with a miniature windmill structure near the admissions building and the planting of thousands of tulips in the springtime. In 1985, the commissioner to the Queen of the Netherlands presented the university with the Hofstra University Tulip, a flower hybrid named after the school. It is a focal point of Hofstra's annual springtime Dutch Festival.

An on-campus housing complex is known as "the Netherlands" and features residence halls named after cities in the Netherlands, including Delft, Groningen, Hague, Leiden, Rotterdam, Tilburg, Utrecht, Breukelen and Amsterdam.

Hofstra's athletic teams were known as the Flying Dutchmen until 2001.

== Campus ==
The campus has approximately 117 buildings on 244 acres (99 ha), and is located in the Uniondale section of Hempstead, a mile east of the town center. The part of the campus located south of Hempstead Turnpike (NY Route 24) and west of California Avenue is located in Hempstead Village. Hofstra also offers an MBA program as well as other classes in New York City from a center in Manhattan. The campus is roughly 7 miles (11 km) east of the Borough of Queens in New York City, and the entire New York City skyline is visible from the tenth floor of the Axinn Library.

On the campus, two Gilded Age mansions, "The Netherlands" (constructed in 1904 for William S. Hofstra) and "Holland House" (constructed in 1922 for Maxwell Stevenson), have been repurposed to serve as administrative offices.

The campus is located across the street from the "Nassau Hub" and Nassau Veterans Memorial Coliseum, former home of the New York Islanders, Long Island Nets, New York Riptide, and New York Open.

The Arboretum and Bird Sanctuary at Hofstra University have a collection of diverse trees and display an array of rare and colorful tulips in the spring.

== Academics ==
=== Rankings and reputation ===
Academic rankings

National
- Forbes: 292
- U.S. News & World Report: 183
- Washington Monthly: 374
- WSJ/College Pulse: 228

Global
- THE: 501–600
- U.S. News & World Report: 1237

Hofstra University is accredited in 28 academic areas and 32 total areas. It offers 185 undergraduate and 170 graduate program options.

Hofstra was ranked tied for 160th among national universities and named the 92nd "Best value school" by U.S. News & World Report for 2020, with its undergraduate engineering program ranked tied for 33rd among schools where doctorates are not offered. U.S. News also rated the part-time MBA program tied for 154th and the graduate programs in education as 133rd, among others.

The Stuart and Nancy Rabinowitz Honors College, whose admissions policy is more selective than that of the university as a whole, offers rigorous educational opportunities for high-achieving students. The School for University Studies provides a program for students whose abilities are not reflected in standardized test scores, while New Opportunities at Hofstra (NOAH) is designed for students whose educational progress to date has been restricted by limited educational opportunities or economic status.

In the fall of 2011, the university welcomed the first class of students to its new Hofstra Northwell School of Medicine. In 2012, it established its school of engineering and applied science, featuring programs that partner with regional industry leaders, and its school of health sciences and human services, housing a new Master of Public Health program. In August 2017, after a $61 million donation to the school, it was renamed the Donald and Barbara Zucker School of Medicine at Hofstra/Northwell.

The Zucker School of Medicine was ranked Tier 3 in primary care and Tier 2 in research, according to U.S. News & World Report, despite it being only being a decade since its first class graduated.

=== Admissions ===
Hofstra maintains a test-optional policy for admissions. For the cohort entering in 2024, 29% of enrollees submitted test scores; the average scores for the SAT were 1310–1400 and for the ACT were 30–32. Hofstra admitted 68% of applicants with enrolled students having an average 3.7 GPA.

=== Schools and colleges ===
Hofstra University has the following schools:

- Donald and Barbara Zucker School of Medicine at Hofstra/Northwell
- Frank G. Zarb School of Business
- Fred DeMatteis School of Engineering and Applied Science
- Hofstra College of Liberal Arts and Sciences
- Hofstra Northwell School of Nursing and Physician Assistant Studies
- Maurice A. Deane School of Law
- Peter S. Kalikow School of Government, Public Policy and International Affairs
- School of Education
- School of Health Sciences
- School of Humanities, Fine and Performing Arts
- School of Natural Sciences and Mathematics
- Stuart and Nancy Rabinowitz Honors College
- The Lawrence Herbert School of Communication

== Athletics ==
Hofstra University teams were nicknamed the Flying Dutchmen from 1935 until 2001. The school's official team name became "The Pride" in 2001, referring to a pair of lions which became the school's athletic mascots in the late 1980s. The Pride nickname evolved from the Hofstra Pride on- and off-campus image campaign that began in 1987, during the university's dramatic recovery and growth. This followed a financial crisis in the 1970s that forced the layoff of more than 100 employees. In 1977 Hofstra wrestler Nick Gallo won the 126 lb weight class at the NCAA National Championship and was a member of the 1976 and 1980 U.S. Olympic Freestyle Wrestling teams, he was also given the title "Most Outstanding Wrestler" in the 1977 NCAA Division I Wrestling Championships.

Prior to 2008, the New York Jets held summer training camp at their on-campus headquarters before moving to their new headquarters in Florham Park, New Jersey. The area has since been used for the construction of the medical school building, which was completed in 2015.

On December 3, 2009, the university announced it was terminating the football program. Under NCAA rules, any football players who chose to transfer to other schools were eligible to play immediately, and not subjected to normal residency waiting periods. Scholarship-holders who wished to stay at Hofstra were permitted to keep their scholarships. Funds previously used for the football program went into the creation of the medical school, and enhancing a variety of programs, including hard sciences and engineering.

On February 26, 2011, Hofstra Senior Day, the university retired the basketball jersey number 22 to honor senior Charles Jenkins before the end of the season. Jenkins, the school's all-time leading scorer, ranked fifth in the nation at 23.3 points per game last season (as of 22 February 2011) and was the front-runner to win Colonial Athletic Association Player of the Year honors. No other Hofstra athlete in any sport has received the same honor.

== Media ==
=== Student newspaper ===
The Hofstra Chronicle is the only student newspaper at Hofstra University. Established in 1935 and supported by the student activity fee and advertising, it is published in tabloid format every Tuesday evening each semester, with additional content available online.

=== Student radio station ===
The university operates Long Island's oldest public radio station, WRHU-FM (88.7). The non-commercial station was founded in 1950 as WHCH, a campus-limited station, and received its broadcast license on June 9, 1959, using the call letters WVHC. The station became WRHU (for Radio Hofstra University) in 1983. WRHU currently serves as the radio home of the Long Island Nets and New York Islanders, producing over 675 NHL broadcasts since 2010. It is the only student-run radio station to receive four Marconi Awards from the National Association of Broadcasters.

== Notable alumni and faculty ==
Notable Hofstra alumni include:

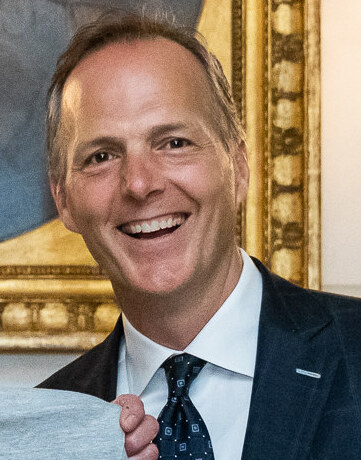
Jon Cooper, head coach of the Tampa Bay Lightning

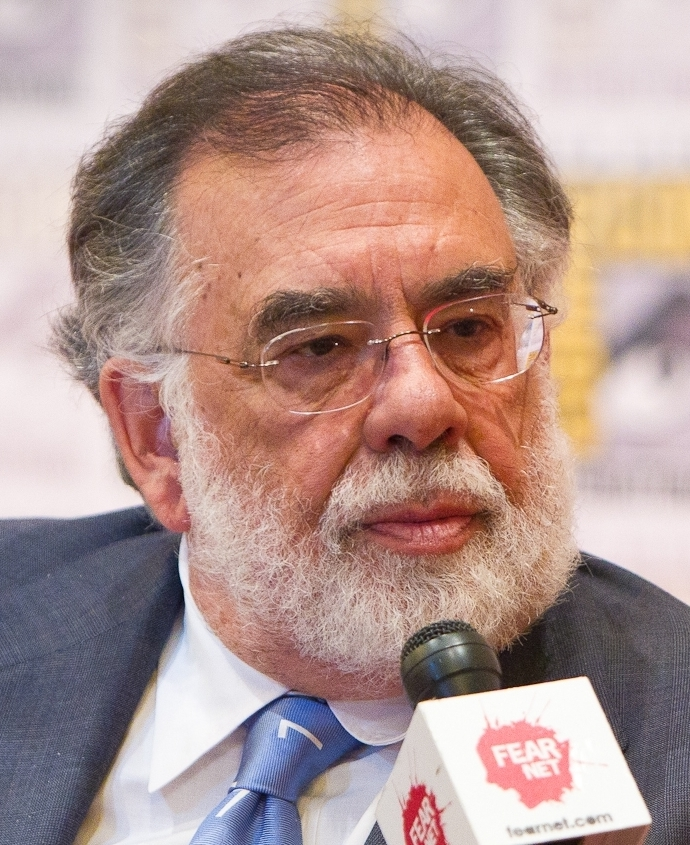
Francis Ford Coppola, film director

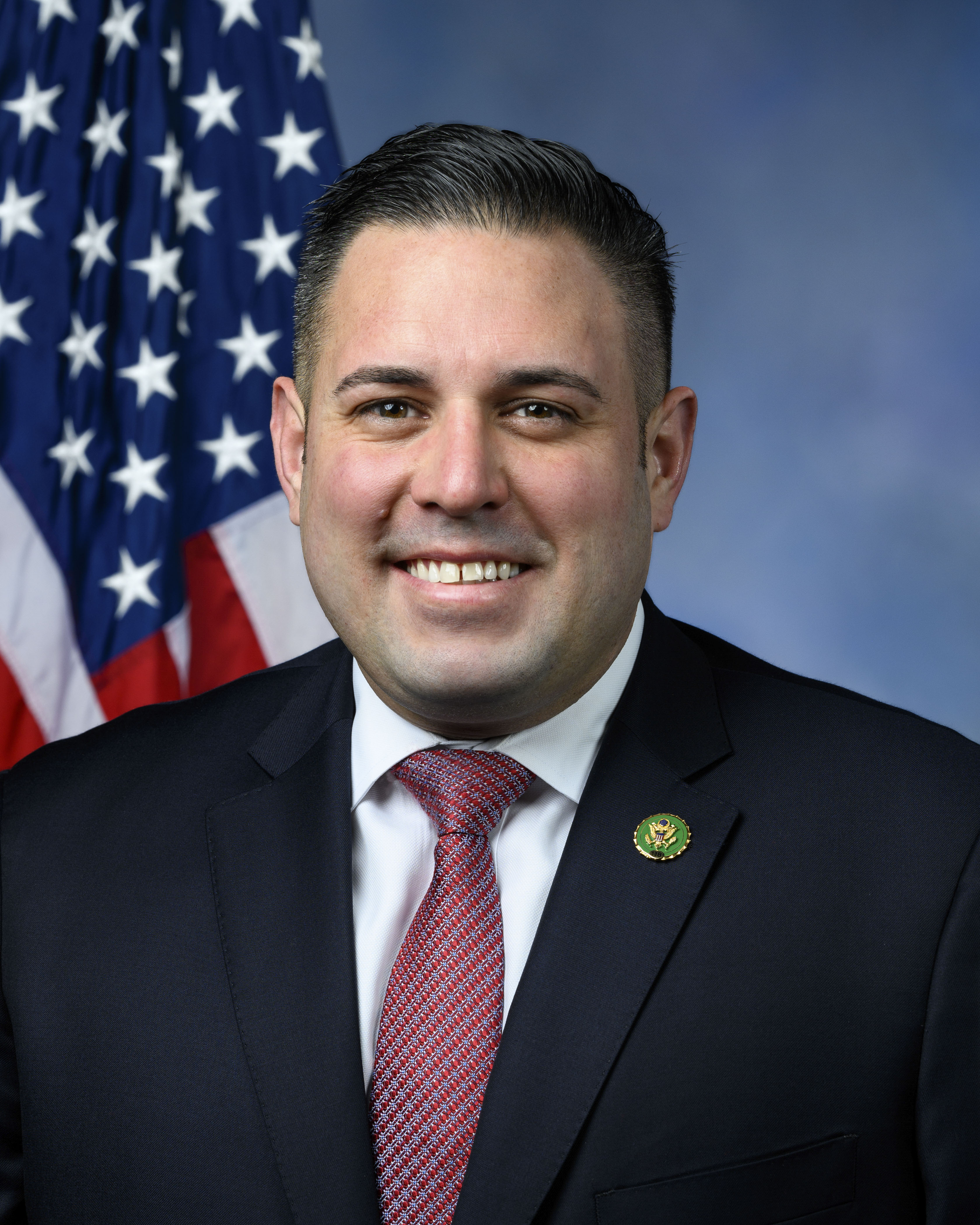
Anthony D'Esposito, American politician

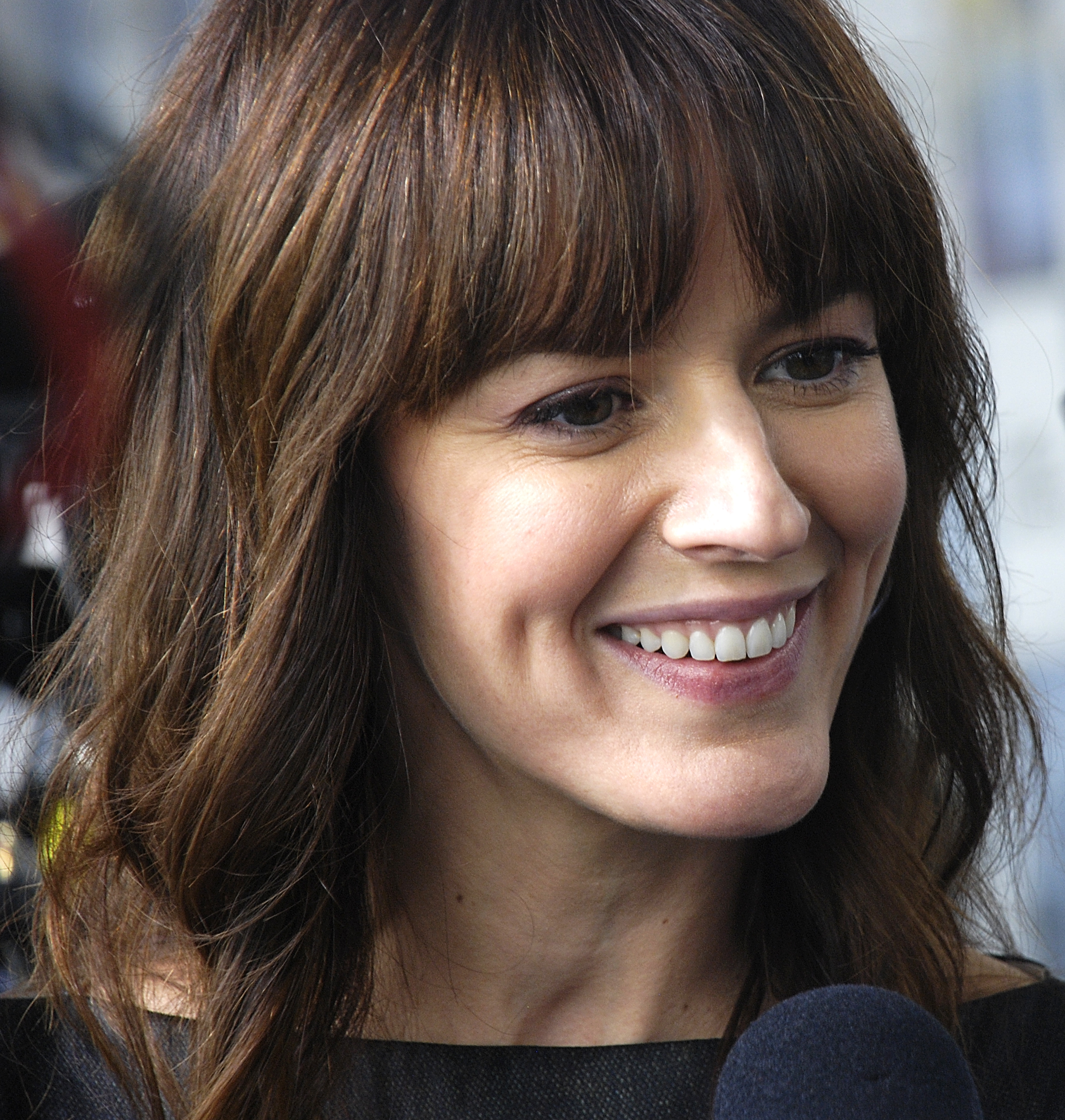
Rosemarie DeWitt, actress

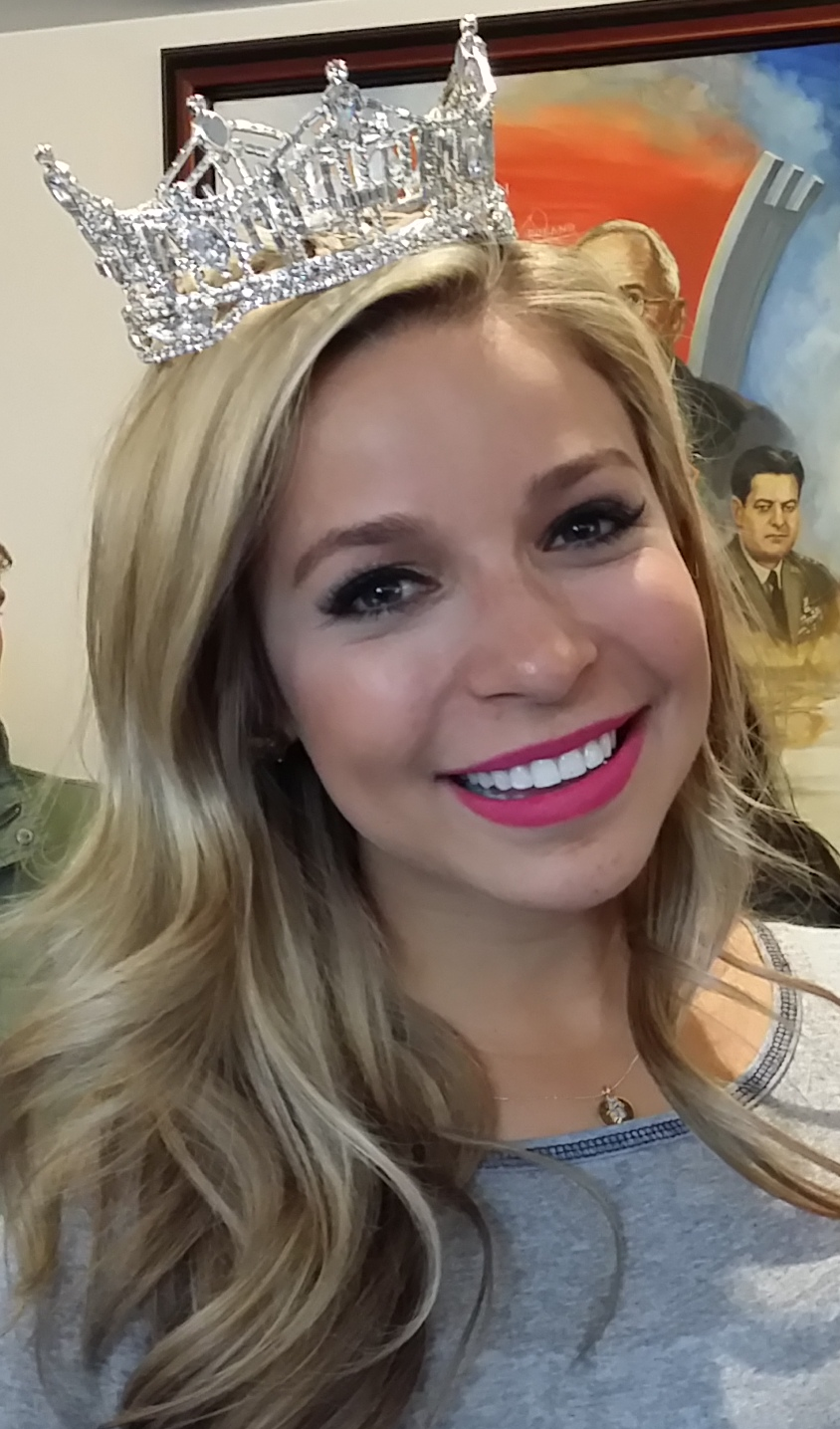
Kira Kazantsev, Miss America 2015

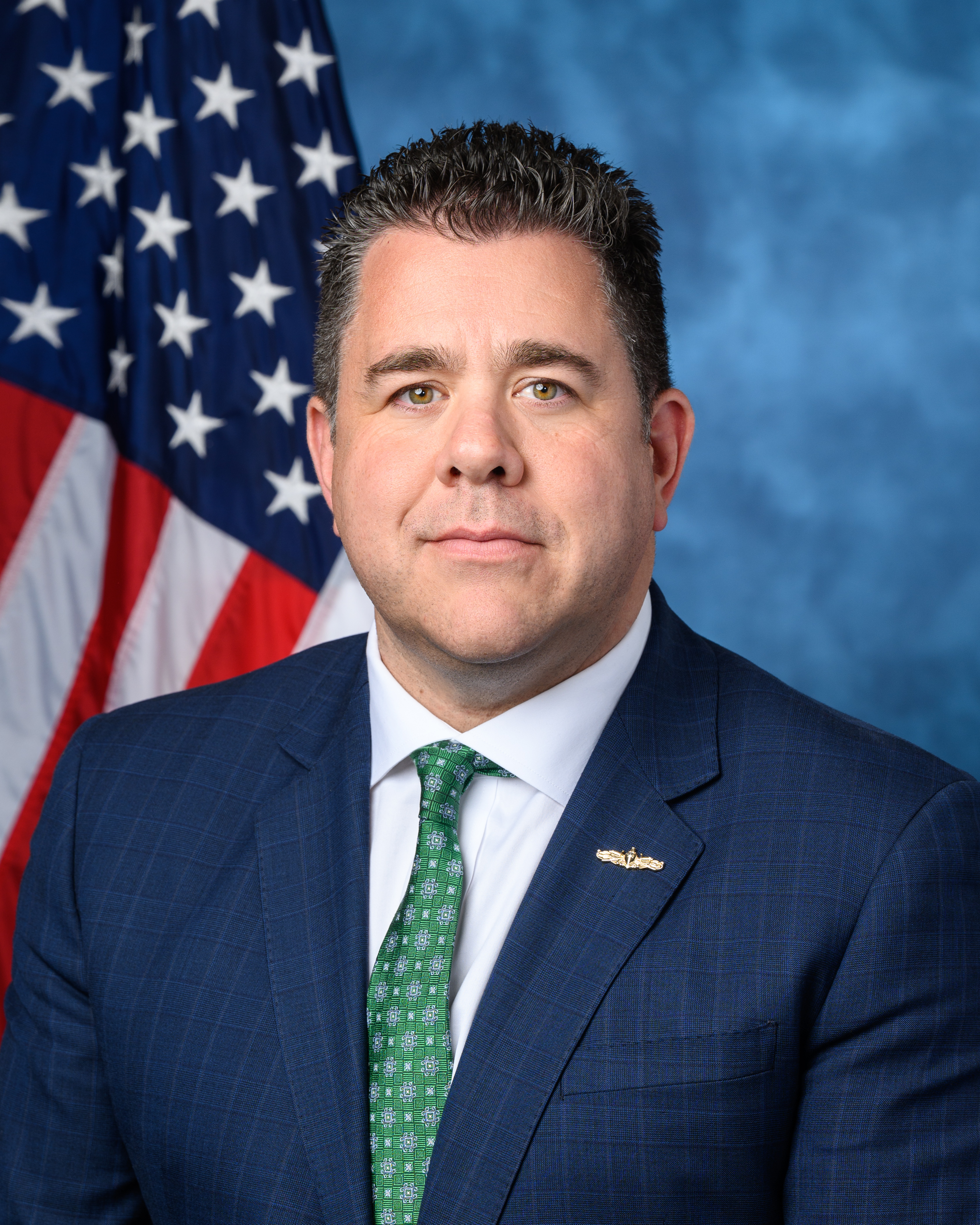
Nick LaLota, American politician

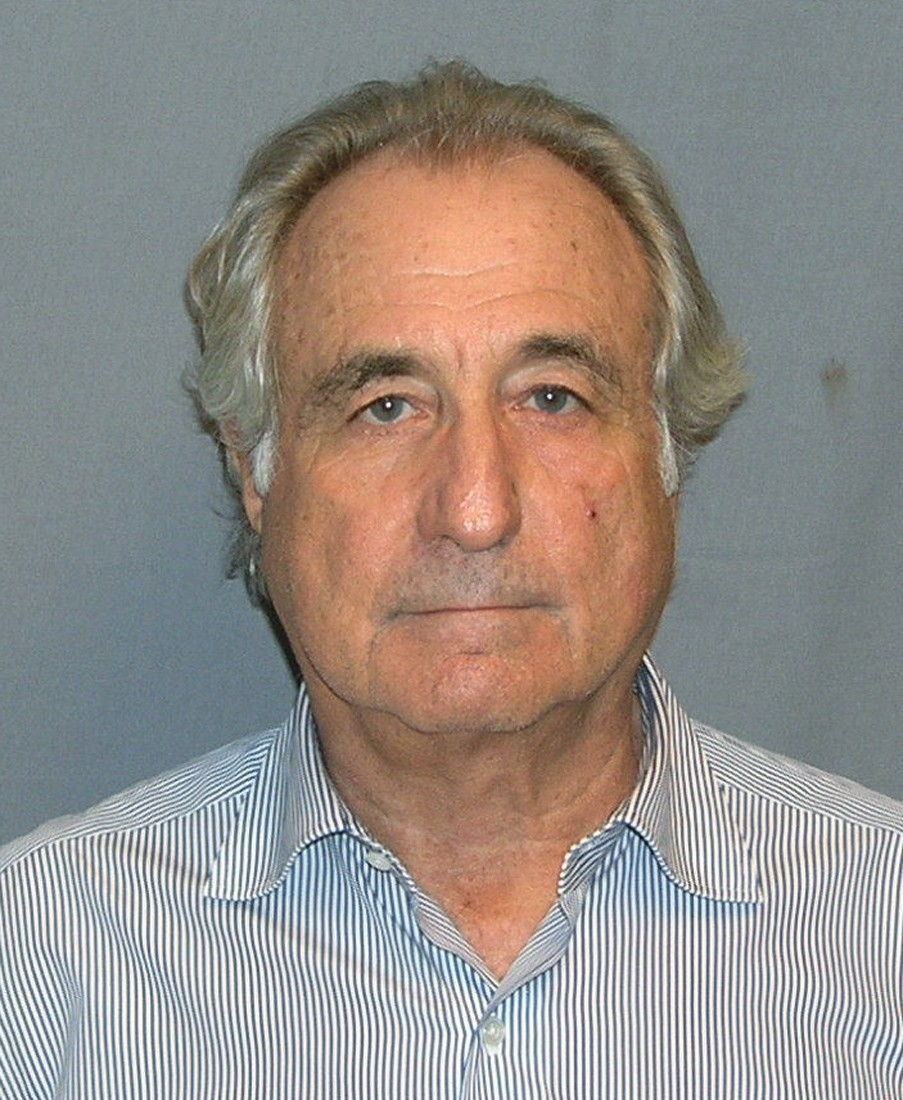
Bernie Madoff, convicted fraudster

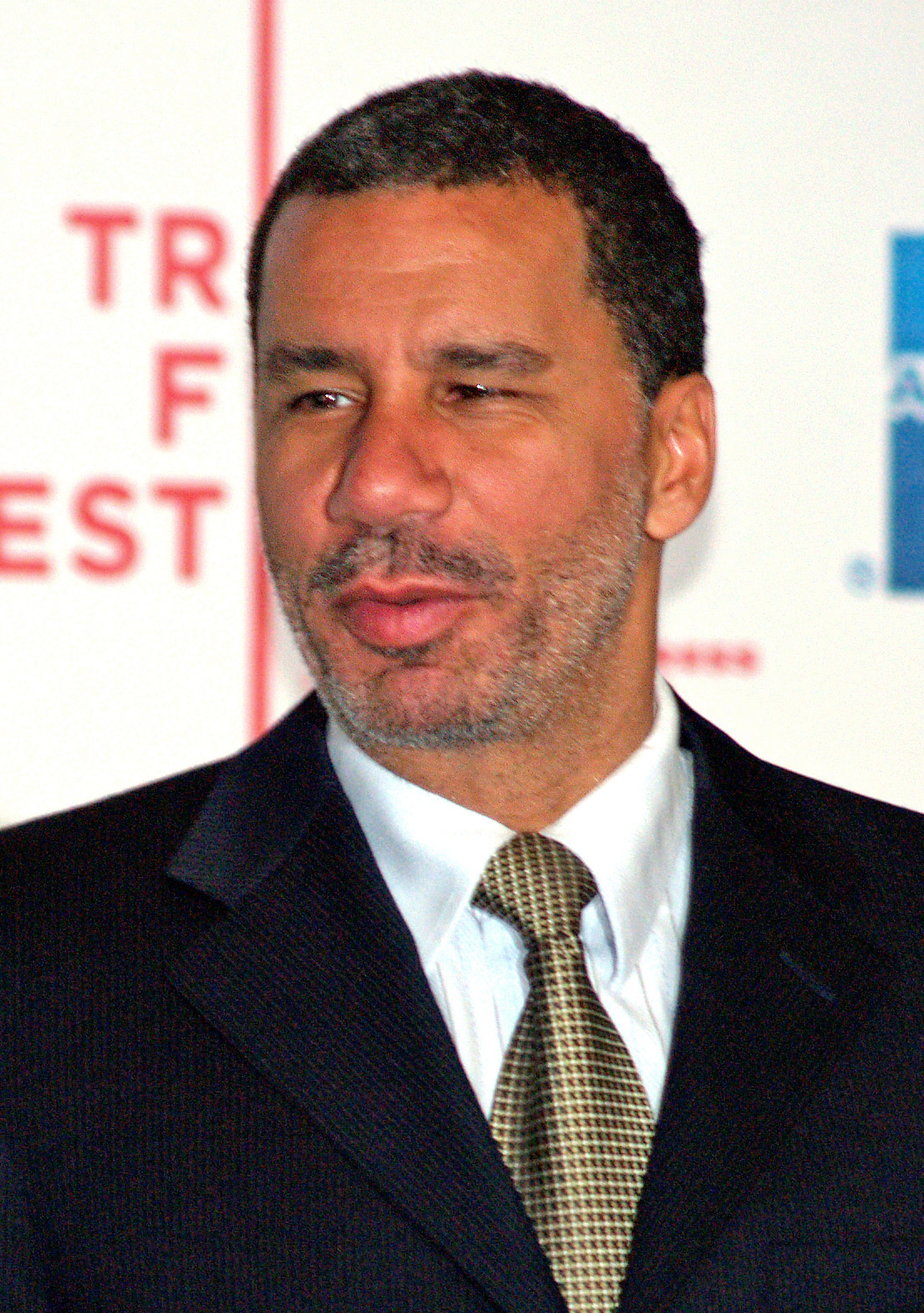
David Paterson, former Governor of New York

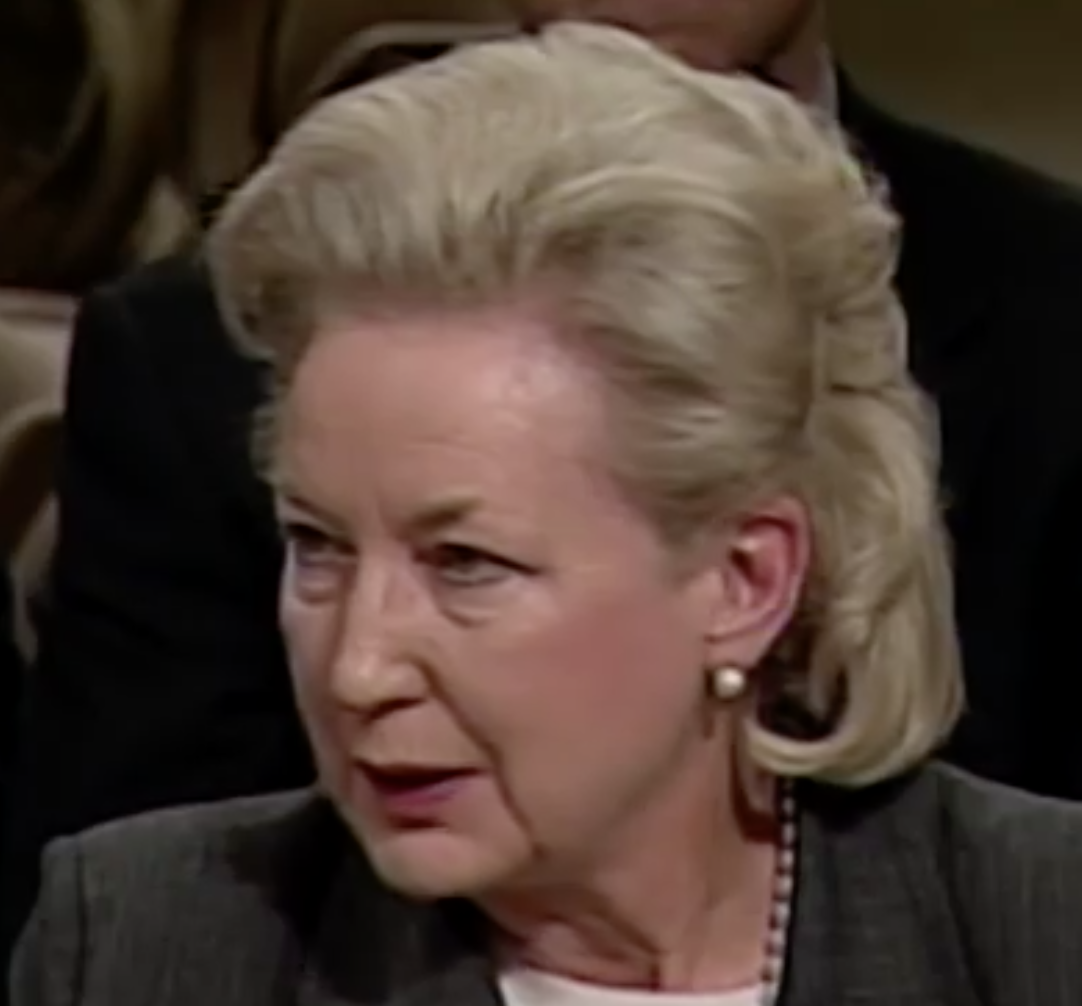
Maryanne Trump Barry, Judge of the U.S. Court of Appeals for the Third Circuit and sister of current President Donald Trump

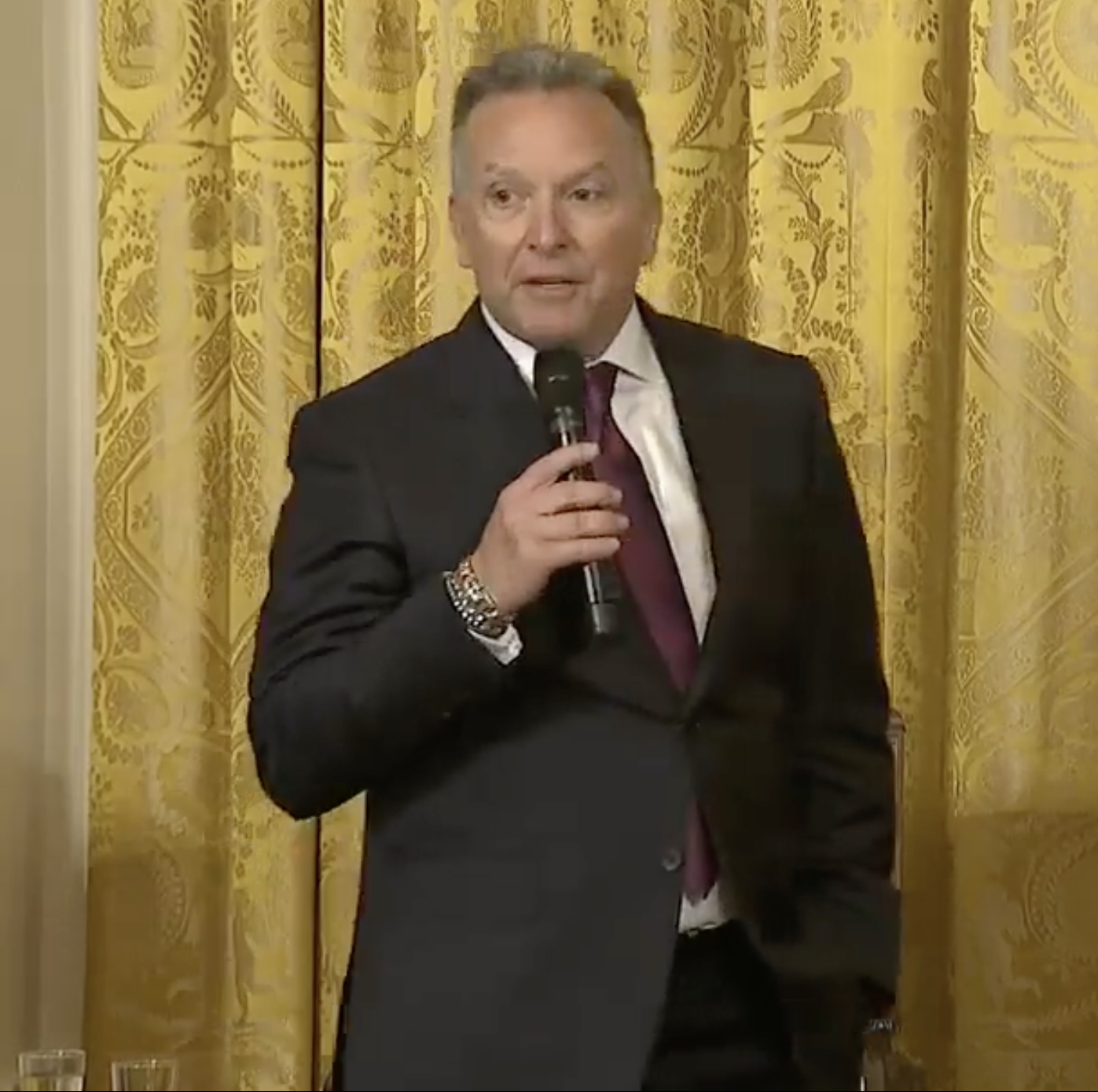
Steve Witkoff, United States Special Envoy to the Middle East, real estate investor and developer, attorney

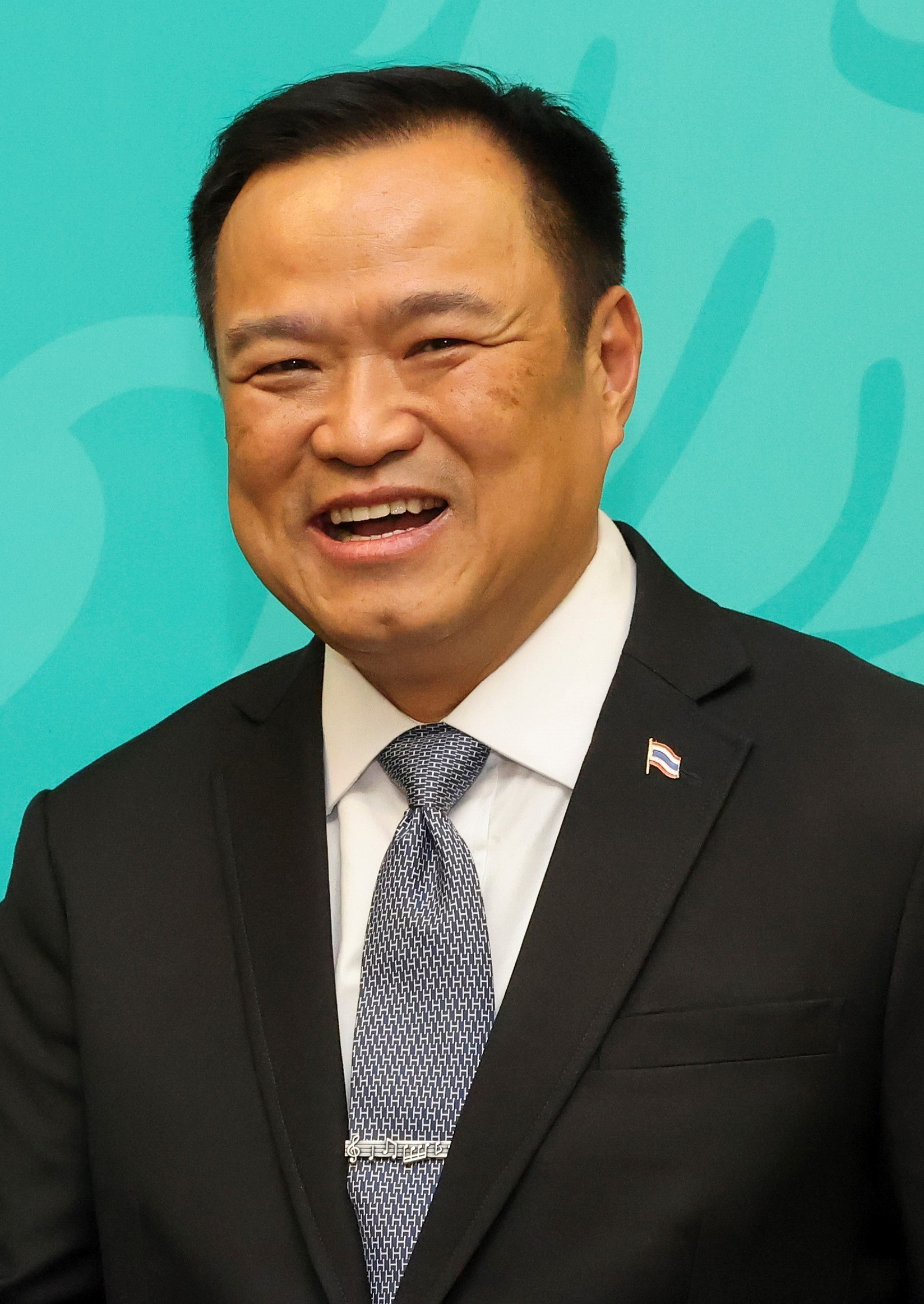
Anutin Charnvirakul, 32nd Prime Minister of Thailand

== Gallery ==
Campus

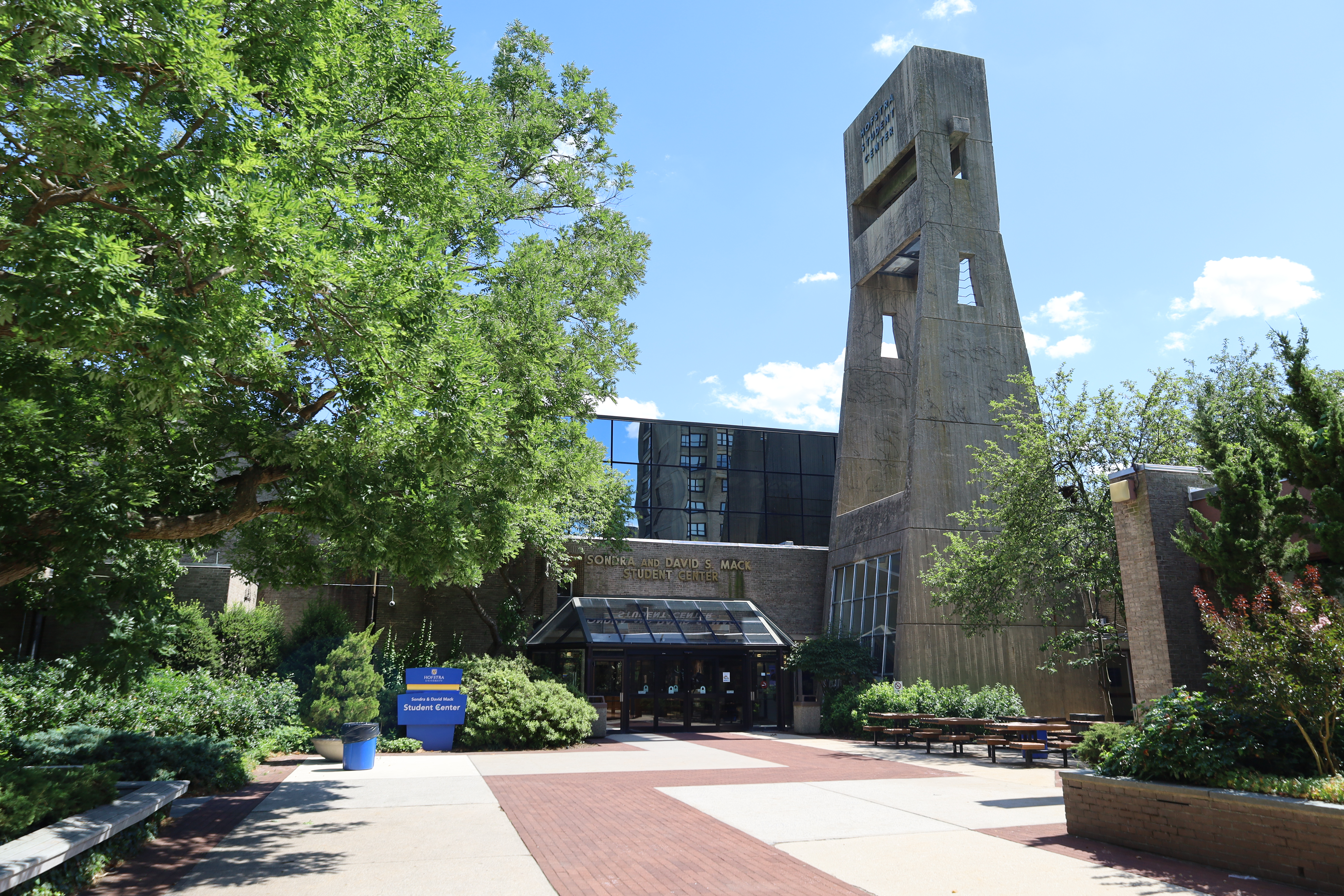
David S. Mack Student Center

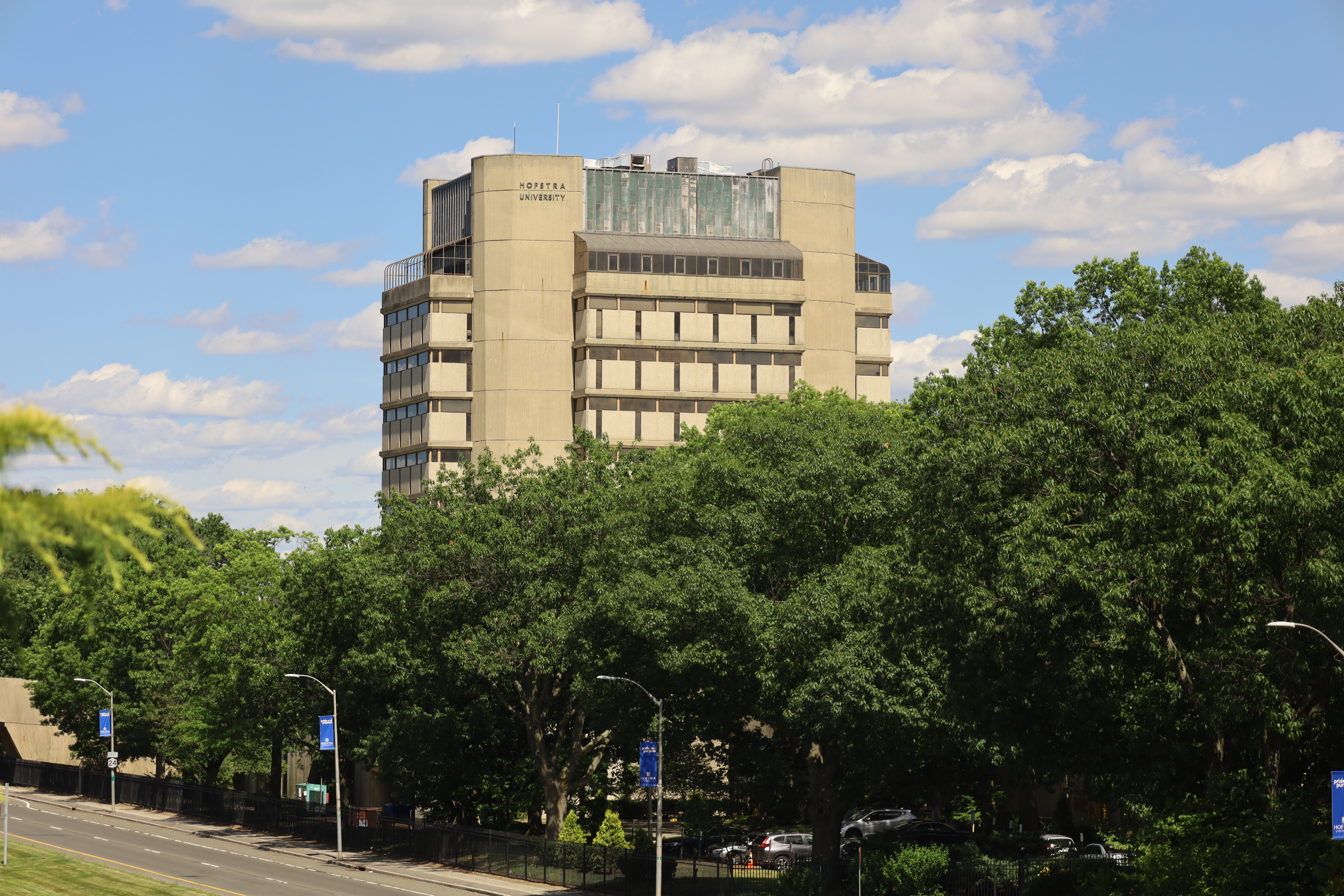
Joan and Donald E. Axinn Library

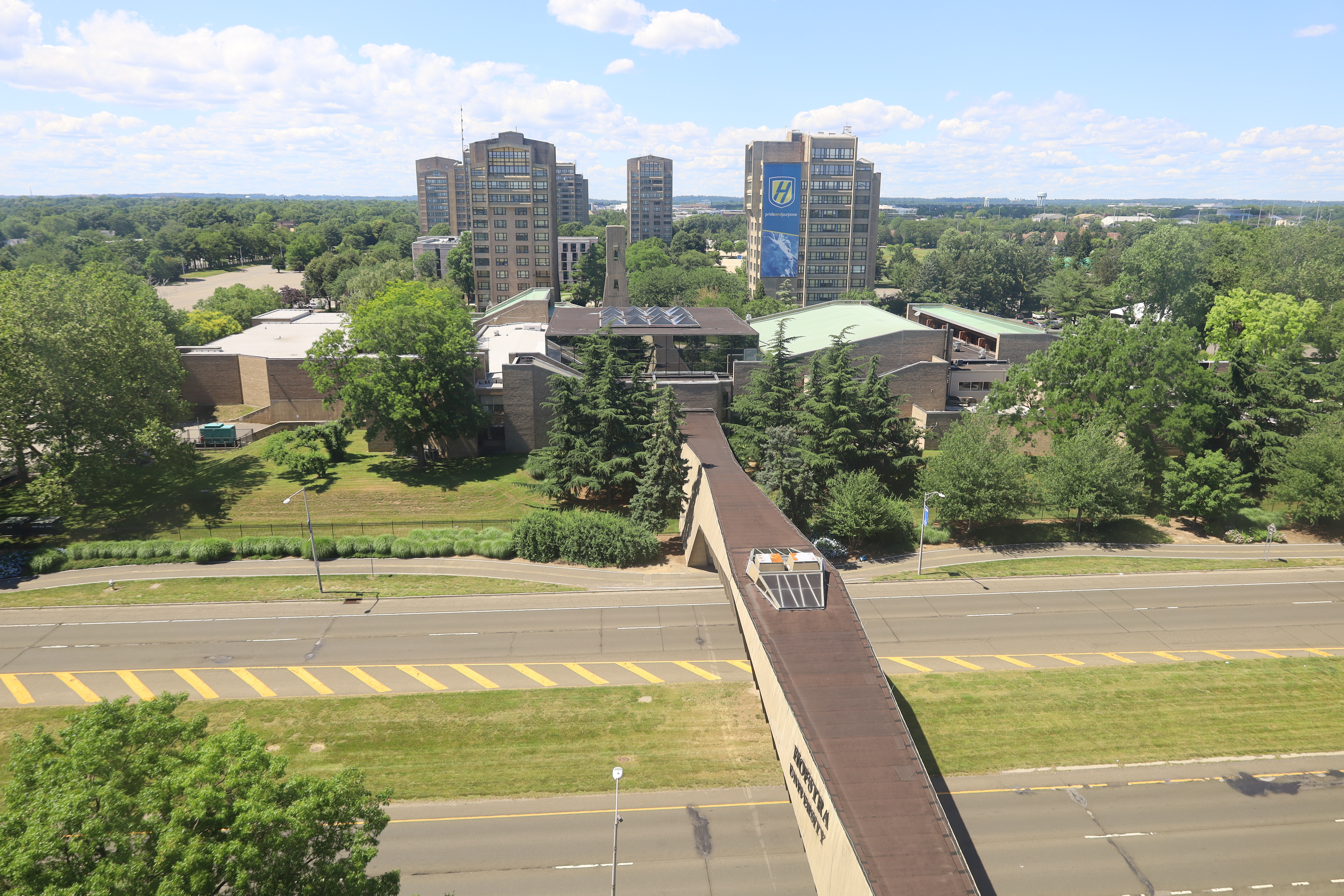
The Unispan (bottom), David S. Mack Student Center, and dormitories

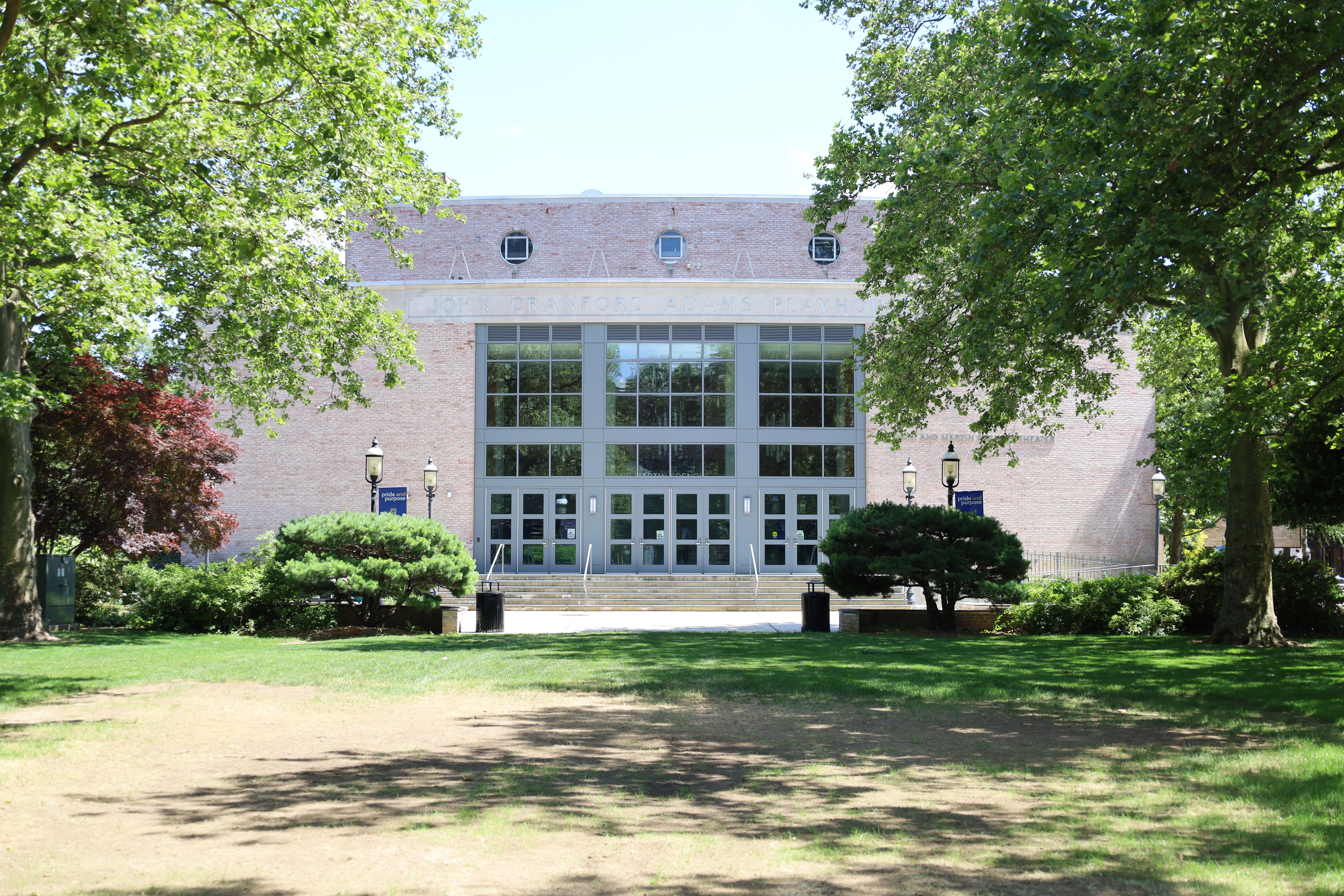
John Cranford Adams Playhouse

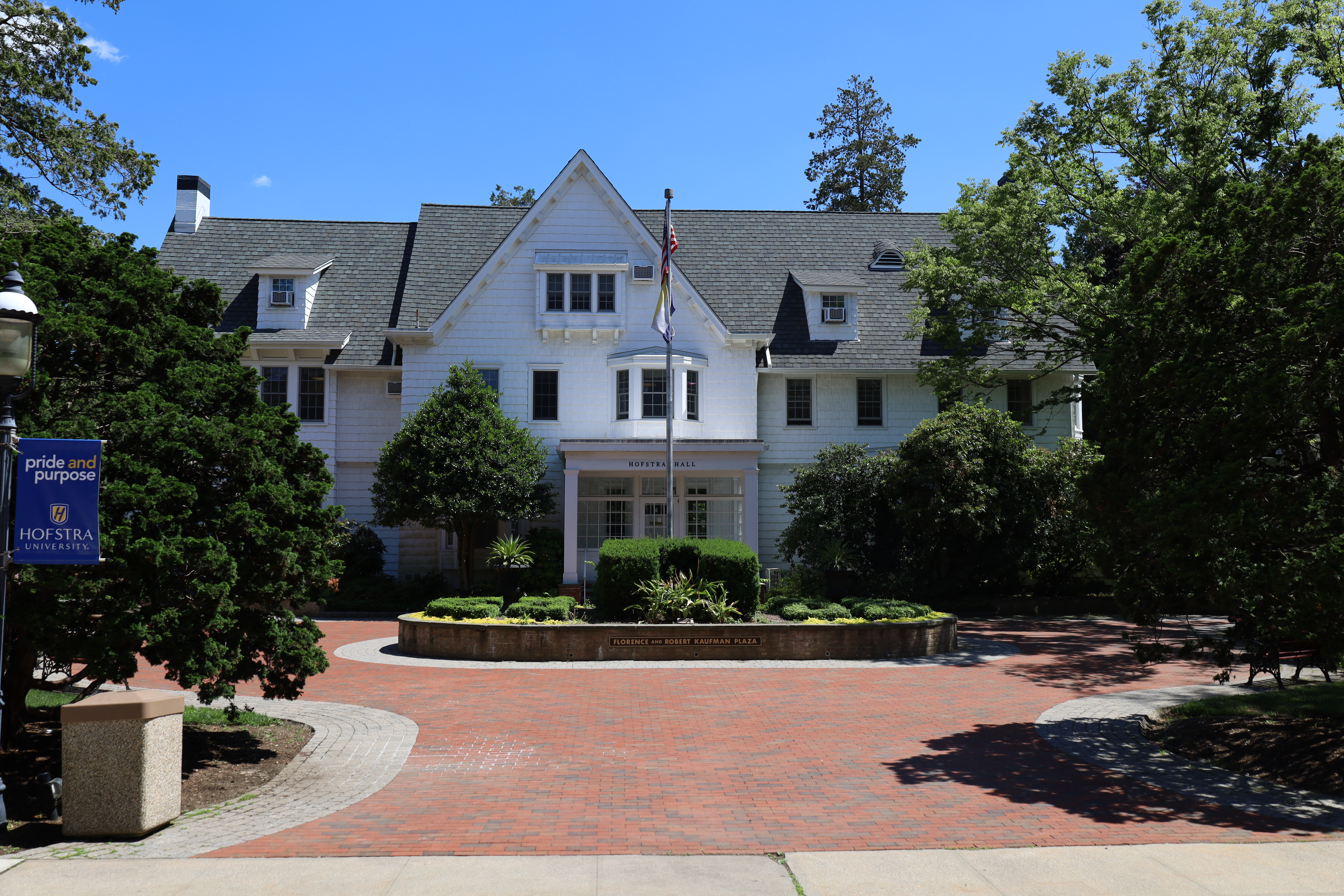
Hofstra Hall,

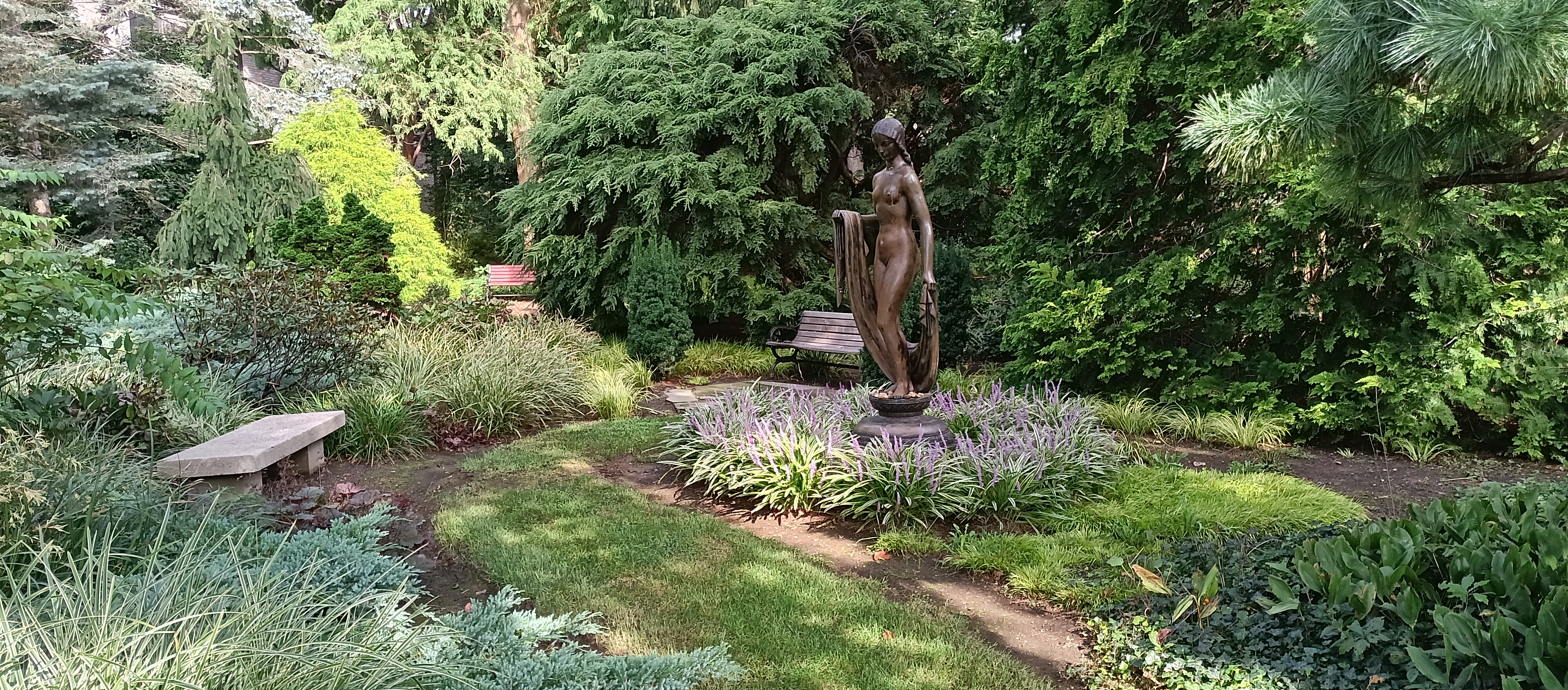
Hofstra Arboretum

== See also ==
- Hofstra (surname)
