= Ezekiel Cornell =

American politician (1733–1800)

- Born: March 27, 1733; Dartmouth, Massachusetts, British America
- Died: April 25, 1800 (aged 67); Milford, Massachusetts, U.S.

Ezekiel Cornell (27 March 1733 – April 25, 1800) was a Revolutionary War general who represented Rhode Island in the U.S. Continental Congress from 1780 to 1782.

== Early life ==
Ezekiel Cornell was born on March 27, 1733 in Dartmouth, Massachusetts to Richard Cornell and Content Brownell. He was a descendant of Thomas Cornell. Ezekiel Cornell married Rachel Wood of Little Compton on March 25, 1760, and they had two surviving children, Ezra and Rhoda. Cornell attended the public schools and was employed as a mechanic. Cornell served as Scituate's town meeting moderator in 1768, 1781 and 1785 and as a Deputy (Representative) from Scituate to the General Assembly in 1772, 1774 and 1775.

In August 1774 he was commissioned as the colonel of the 3rd Providence County Regiment of the Rhode Island Militia.

== Revolutionary War service ==
During the American Revolution Cornell, nicknamed "Old Snarl," was appointed lieutenant colonel in Hitchcock's Regiment in April 1775 and was present at the Siege of Boston. The unit and fought at Bunker Hill in June 1775 and was taken into the Continental Army when General George Washington arrived in July to take command. Following the British evacuation of Boston in March 1776, the army was redeployed to Long Island in September 1776.

On Long Island he occupied the former British controlled St. George's Episcopal Church (Hempstead, New York), which had been founded by relatives of Cornell including his cousin William Cornell, and was a hotbed of Tory sentiment, and Cornell sought to root out Loyalists. Cornell "converted the Episcopal Church into a store house, forbid the parson to pray for the King or any of the Royal Family and made use of the communion table as a convenience for his Yankees to eat upon."

Cornell was part of the Continental Army contingent, dispatched by General Nathaniel Greene that arrested Loyalist Mayor of New York David Mathews on June 22, 1776, on suspicion of Mathews' participation in the plot by Thomas Hickey to kill General George Washington.

Cornell left Hempstead sometime before August 1776. On October 1, 1776, Cornell was appointed Deputy Adjutant General of the Continental Army. Cornell resigned from the Continental Army in December 1776 and returned to Rhode Island.

Cornell was appointed brigadier general of Rhode Island state troops on December 1, 1777, and served until March 16, 1780. He commanded a brigade of state troops consisting of two infantry regiments of eight companies each and an artillery regiment of four batteries. Cornell played an active role at the Battle of Rhode Island in 1778.

== Continental Congress service ==
Cornell served as a member of the Continental Congress from 1780 until 1782 and chaired the military committee. After his service in Congress, he retired to his farm at Scituate, Rhode Island.

Ezekiel Cornell died in Milford, Massachusetts on April 25, 1800. His site of burial is unknown.
