= William S. Hofstra =

American businessman (1861–1932)

- Born: William Sake Hofstra; May 31, 1861; Holland, Michigan, U.S.
- Died: May 11, 1932 (aged 70); Hempstead, New York, U.S.
- Occupations: Businessman, philanthropist
- Known for: Namesake of Hofstra University

William Sake Hofstra (May 31, 1861 – May 11, 1932) was an American businessman and philanthropist.

== Early life ==
William Sake Hofstra was born on May 31, 1861, in Holland, Michigan. He was the son of Sake Hofstra and Wilhelmina Zageweg, who were Dutch immigrants from Franeker in the province of Friesland. The name "Hofstra", which is a short form of "Hoflandstra", means "from the courtyard/farmyard/garden" in Frisian and goes back to an ancestor from an estate near the village of Grou.

Hofstra grew up in various cities in Michigan. His family moved from Holland to Grand Rapids in 1863, where his father worked as a baker, and to Muskegon in 1867, where his father worked as a hotel keeper. In 1875, his family built a home and a hotel in Muskegon. A few years later, in 1880, Hofstra's mother died from typhus.

== Family, marriages and business ==
In 1881, Hofstra married Anna Laura Morton and they had two daughters, one (Margaret Hofstra Angelin) of whom lived to adulthood. Hofstra and his wife divorced, and he remarried to Kate Mason Wiliams, a widow originally from Boston, Massachusetts, who was seven years his senior, and they had no children. Hofstra was involved in various lumber businesses in Michigan, Canada, New Orleans, Florida, and New York. William Hofstra worked in the lumber business with Howard Brower as a partner in the Nassau Lumber Company and was a director of Price Brothers Company, another wood and paper products company based in Canada.

In 1903, Hofstra and his second wife, Kate Mason (1854–1933), purchased the 15-acre Van Vranken Estate in Hempstead, New York, and hired H. Craig Severance to design their retirement home there, moving into the house in 1904. To honor his Dutch roots, Hofstra called the estate "The Netherlands," which is now known as Hofstra Hall. Hofstra died in 1932 and Kate died the following year.

== Hofstra University ==
Kate Hofstra bequeathed the family home and funding for a trust to honor her husband and left other bequests to St. George's Episcopal Church in Hempstead and to various friends and family. In 1935, the trustees created a branch of New York University in the former Hofstra home, and by 1963, the institution was renamed Hofstra University. The school's colors and the Hofstra seal honor the Dutch heritage of Hofstra.
