= Clifford Lee Lord =

4th President of Hofstra University (1912–1980)

4th President of Hofstra University
- In office October 1, 1964 – September 1, 1972
- Preceded by: John Cranford Adams
- Succeeded by: James H. Marshall

Personal details
- Born: September 4, 1912 Mount Vernon, New York
- Died: October 22, 1980 (aged 68) West Orange, New Jersey
- Education: Amherst College (BA, MA); Columbia University

Clifford Lee Lord (September 4, 1912 – October 22, 1980) was a historian and American Administrator who served as the 4th President of Hofstra University from 1964 to 1972. He previously served as the dean of the School of General Studies at Columbia University, where he taught history. After his tenure at Hofstra, he served as the President of the Hudson Institute. He died of cancer on October 22, 1980.

== Early life ==
Lord was born to Bertha Eunice Lord (née Lee October 24, 1875 Port Jefferson, New York – June 6, 1963 Mount Vernon, New York) and Charles Clifford Lord (May 6, 1877 Hull, Quebec – November 22, 1959 Mount Vernon, New York) on September 04, 1912, in Mount Vernon, New York. His father was a member of the Mount Vernon Planning Board and a graduate of Cornell University. Clifford would live with his parents, his aunt Ruah, and his maternal grandmother Alice until he left for college. He would then go on to study at Amherst College and receive both a Bachelor of Arts and Master of Arts in 1933 and 1934, respectively.

== Early career ==
After earning his degree from Amherst, Lord taught American History at Columbia University from 1935 to 1941. After his first stint at Columbia, Lord served as the director of the New York State Historical Association at Cooperstown from 1941 to 1946. During this time, he would serve in World War II in the Navy as a lieutenant in the Bureau of Aeronautics. Before entering the war, Lord reportedly sent $25 to Franklin Delano Roosevelt, encouraging him to run for a fourth term. He would eventually get a written response back from Roosevelt's advisor Harry Hopkins and he stated they could not take the money as Roosevelt had not decided to run yet. After his service, Lord would earn his PhD from Columbia in 1943. Lord then went off to be the director of the State Historical Society of Wisconsin at the University of Wisconsin-Madison from 1946 to 1958.

== Administrative career ==
=== Columbia University ===
Lord returned to Columbia to serve as the Dean of the School of General Studies in 1958 and spearheaded many initiatives, which included only having full-time teachers and not temporaries, and the relocation of the school to the former School of Mines building, now Lewisohn Hall. Lord also gained national attention when he was forced to buy two scoops of ice cream and not just one. Thus, he wrote a letter to Mayor Robert F. Wagner, Jr. about the incident and City Hall approved for people to order only one scoop of ice cream if they wished.

=== Hofstra University ===
Lord was elected to the presidency of Hofstra University on April 8, 1964, and took his post succeeding outgoing president John Cranford Adams in October of that year. On Lord, the university stated he was a "scholar, administrator, and a man deeply committed to the world about him". Lord's tenure included, most notably the establishment of the Hofstra Law School as well as the expansion of the North campus to include the Student Center, multiple dorms on campus as well as other enhancements due to the acquisition of land form the former Mitchel Air Force Base. However, certain instances including protests of the ROTC program during the Vietnam War, calls from black students for more minority representation amidst the Civil Rights Movement and the complete severance of the alumni association from the university were among multiple conflicts during his presidency. Some other notable events during his presidency include the failed merger of Hofstra and neighboring Adelphi University, and radio station WVHC almost going off the air due to budget shortages. Additionally, Lord made strides to embrace the Civil Rights Movement, by appointing the first two African Americans to leadership positions with Edward B. King, Jr. and Philip A. Jordan gaining the administrative posts of assistant to the president, and assistant dean of students, respectively. Lord would end up being elevated to Chancellor of the university in 1972 at his request, to work on financial and long-term planning for the university. The day-to-day operations were to be headed under James H. Marshall, who then became president. Lord would end up leaving Hofstra in 1973 to join the Hudson Institute.

== Death ==
Lord died on October 22, 1980, due to complications from cancer in West Orange, New Jersey.

== Awards & honors ==
Lord has received numerous honorary degrees including from Adelphi University (LL.D., 1965), Amherst College (1953), and Lawrence University (LL.D., 1948).

== Personal life ==
Lord married Elizabeth Lord (née Hubbard) and they had two children Charles Hubbard Lord and Helen Patricia Lord.

Preceded by John Cranford Adams	President of Hofstra University; 1964–1972	Succeeded by James H. Marshall
