= St. George's Episcopal Church (Hempstead, New York) =

Historic church in New York, United States

- St. George's Church
- U.S. National Register of Historic Places
- St. George's Church circa 1734

- Location within New York Location within the United States Location within the United States
- Location: 319 Front Street, Hempstead, New York
- Coordinates: 40°42′24.5″N 73°37′20.9″W
- Built: 1822
- Architect: Timothy Clowes
- NRHP reference No.: 73001211
- Rectory of St. George's Episcopal Church
- U.S. National Register of Historic Places
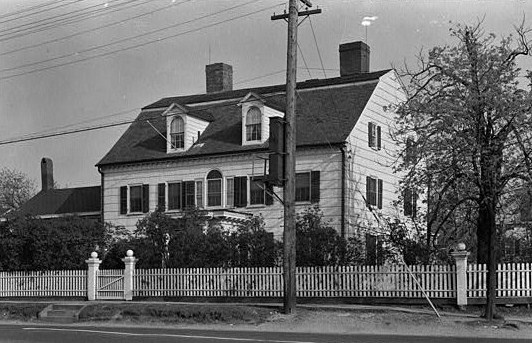
- St. George's Rectory

- Location within New York Location within the United States Location within the United States
- Location: 217 Peninsula Blvd., Hempstead, New York
- Coordinates: 40°42′18.8″N 73°37′17″W
- Built: 1793
- Architect: Timothy Clowes
- NRHP reference No.: 88000510
- Added to NRHP: May 3, 1988
- Added to NRHP: March 7, 1973

St. George's Episcopal Church is an historic Episcopal church located at 319 Front Street (NY 102) in Hempstead, New York. It was constructed in 1822 and listed on the National Register of Historic Places in 1973 as St. George's Church.

The Rectory of St. George's Episcopal Church is an historic rectory located at 217 Peninsula Boulevard in Hempstead. It was listed on the National Register, in 1988.

== History ==
Founded in 1702, the church was re-erected in 1734 to replace the original. However, its current edifice was built in 1822 following the second church's destruction.

In 1735, it received a charter from King George II.

During the American Revolution, Hempstead was a hotbed of British sympathizers or Tories, as they were known. The British attempted to occupy Hempstead after the Battle of Long Island and used St. George's as a headquarters as well as a place to worship. Local folklore has it that the rooster weather vane atop the steeple has sixteen bullet marks placed there by Hessian mercenaries who used it for target practice. American troops occupied the church for a period under Ezekiel Cornell from Rhode Island. Cornell "converted the Episcopal Church into a store house, forbid the parson to pray for the King or any of the Royal Family and made use of the communion table as a convenience for his Yankees to eat upon."

Both the church and its rectory are listed on the National Register of Historic Places.

== Erection (1734) ==
On April 2, 1734, John Mott and Thomas Gildersleeve, by order of the town, set apart half an acre for a new church, west of the old one. At first, the church was only half pewed; There were eighteen pews, presumably square. The first pew was given to George Clarke, Secretary to the Governor, who lived in Hyde Park (the modern nearby village of New Hyde Park, which was then called Hyde Park) and was a benefactor to the church.

On November 1, 1734, at a town meeting, the majority voted to move the seats out of the old church into the new.

== Petition to Charter the Church ==
June 27, 1735, names of petitioners for this charter of the church:

- The Rev. Robert Jenney, Rector.
- James Albertus
- Robert Marvin
- George Balden
- Jacamiah Mitchell
- Gerhardus Clowes, clerk of Vestry
- Joseph Mott
- Charles Peters
- William Cornell, Sr. & Jr.
- James Pine, Sr.
- John Cornell, Jr.
- John Roe
- John Cornell
- Micah Smith
- Richard Cornell, Jr.
- Peter Smith, Jr.
- William Cornell
- Timothy Smith
- Thomas Cornell, Jr.
- Peter Smith
- Isaac Germon
- Jacob Smith
- Thomas Gildersleeve
- Joseph Smith
- George Gildersleeve
- Silas Smith
- Daniel Hewlett
- Robert Sutton
- James Hugins
- Richard Thorne, Esq.
- Joseph Langdon
- Joseph Thorne, Esq.
- William Langdon
- Thomas Williams
- Thomas Lee

== Consecration ==
On Tuesday, April 22, 1735, the Governor, with his wife and family, set out for Hempstead to be present at the consecration of the church. Along with him came: his son-in-law and daughter, the then-Secretary George Clarke, the Chief Justice DeLancey, Reverend Vesey, some of the clergy, and a great many of the principal merchants and gentlemen and ladies of the City of New York. About six miles west of Jamaica, the Governor was met by the troops of horse, who escorted him to Jamaica, where dinner was provided for him and all of his company. In the afternoon, he proceeded to Hempstead, (escorted as before), where he arrived in the evening and was entertained by the Reverend Robert Jenney, St. George's minister.

The next day, being St. George's Day, the regiment of militia and troops were drawn up on both sides, from Jenney's house to the church. The Governor, attended by some of the most prominent men in the county, walked to the church. There, a sermon was preached on the occasion, for an extremely crowded audience, by Jenney, from Psalms 115, verses 1 and 2.

After the service, the Governor reviewed the regiment of militia and troops standing under arms and expressed his satisfaction on the appearance both of the officers and men. The Governor was afterwards entertained by Colonel Tredwell, commander of the regiment. In the evening, he was entertained by Colonel Cornwell, of Rockaway, in the same manner.

"The next day the Governor returned to Hempstead, pleased with the reception he everywhere met with from all ranks, with the extraordinary concourse of people from all parts on the occasion, and with the handsome appearance of the militia, both horse and foot." --- New York Gazette

A generous collection was made for the church on this occasion: The Governor gave the King's arms, painted and gilded; Secretary George Clarke gave a crimson damask set of furniture for the communion table, pulpit and desk; John Marsh gave a silver basin for baptism.

The Rev. Mr. Vessey and his people had already contributed about £50.

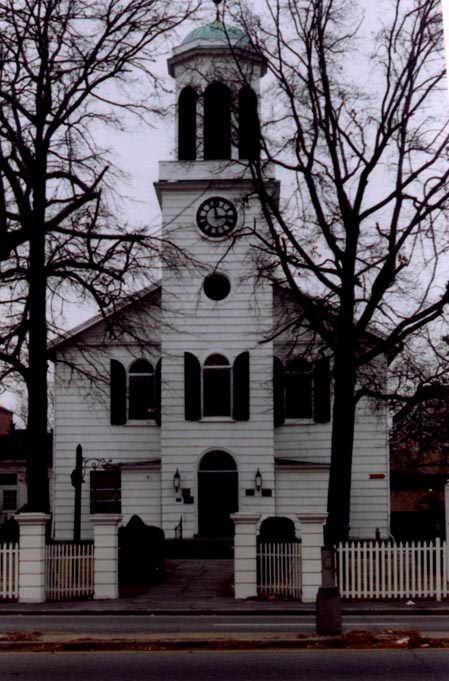
St. George's Church today

== The Current St. George's ==
The current building contains oak interior columns that were dragged across the Hempstead Plains by horse, then hewn and installed in the sanctuary. They span from ground to roof and show little sign of their great age. More than one of the stained glass windows was designed by Tiffany Studios, and the padded pew boxes hearken to days of old on Long Island when the well-to-do would arrive at church in park drag coaches to take their place in the front pew boxes.

== See also ==
- Saint George: Devotions, traditions and prayers
