= John Cranford Adams =

Former President of Hofstra University

2nd President of Hofstra University
- In office May 16, 1945 – October 1, 1964
- Preceded by: Howard S. Brower (Acting)
- Succeeded by: Clifford Lee Lord

Personal details
- Born: October 11, 1903 Boston, Massachusetts, U.S.
- Died: November 24, 1986 (aged 83) Ithaca, New York, U.S.
- Education: Cornell University; King's College, Cambridge

John Cranford Adams (October 11, 1903 – November 24, 1986) was an American educator and academic administrator who served as the second president of Hofstra University from 1944 to 1964.

== Biography ==
Adams was born on October 11, 1903, to John Davis and Mary (Cranford) Adams. He attended Cornell University, where he was a member of the Quill and Dagger Society and received a B.A. in 1926 and a Ph.D. in 1935. He also studied at King's College, Cambridge, England, from 1926 to 1928.

He was an instructor in English at Syracuse University from 1926 to 1928 and at Cornell from 1930 to 1937. He taught at Cornell from 1937 to 1944, first as an assistant professor and then as an associate professor. He was named the second president of Hofstra University in 1944. During his 20-year tenure at Hofstra, the school grew from a small liberal arts college of 367 students to a major university with an enrollment of 9,000 students. The campus theater John Cranford Adams Playhouse and the John Cranford Adams Chair in Literature are named in his honor.

Preceded by Howard S. Brower	President of Hofstra University; 1945–1964	Succeeded by Clifford Lee Lord
