= Hempstead (village), New York =

Hempstead, New York
- Village; Town Seat of Hempstead
- Incorporated Village of Hempstead
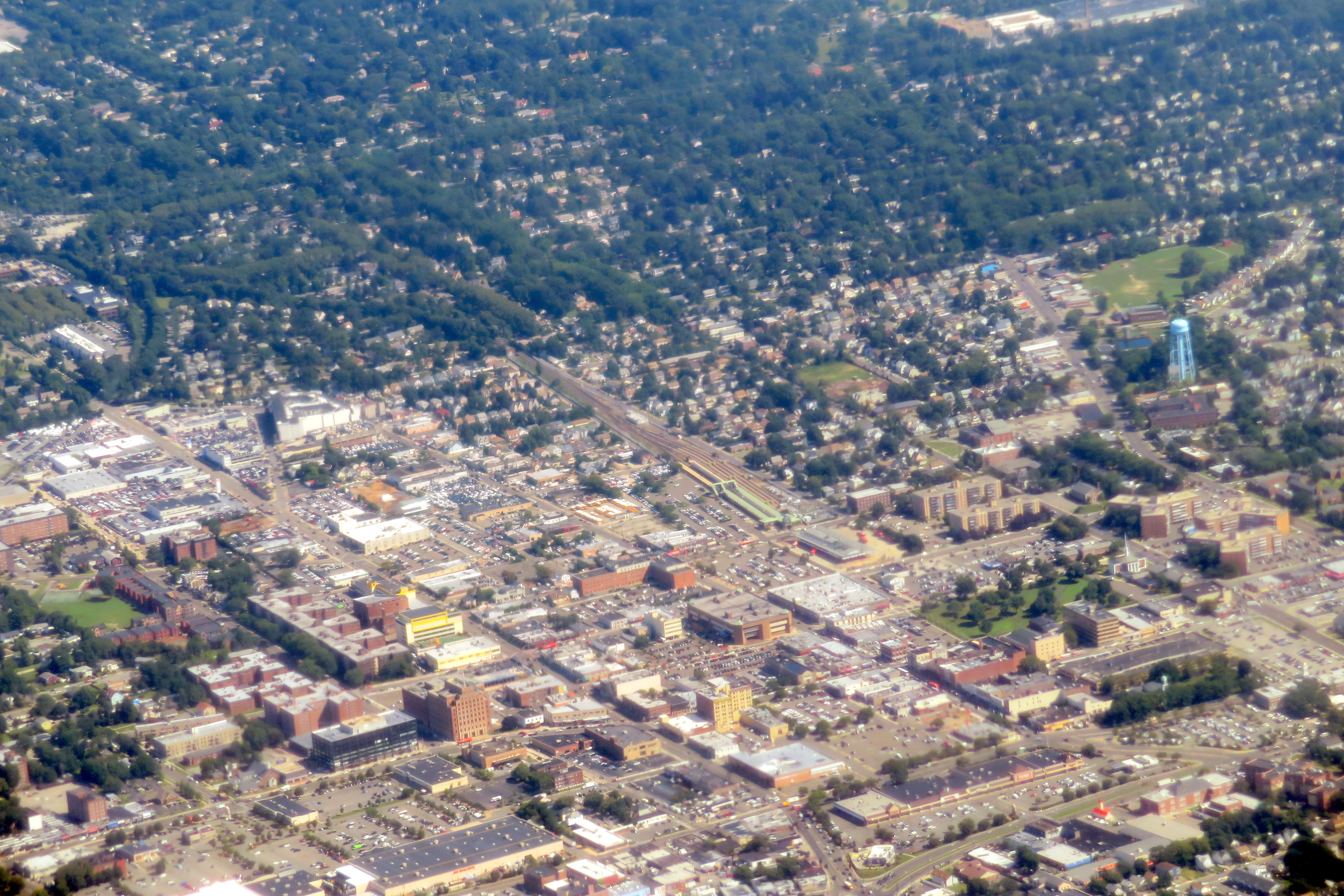
- Hempstead in 2019, as seen from the air

- Seal

- Location in Nassau County and the state of New York

- Location on Long Island Location within the state of New York
- Coordinates: 40°42′17″N 73°37′2″W
- Country: United States
- State: New York
- Region: Long Island
- County: Nassau
- Town: Hempstead
- Settled: 1643
- Incorporated: 1853
- Named for: Heemstede, Netherlands; Hemel Hempstead, UK

Government
  - Mayor: Waylyn Hobbs, Jr. (D)
  - Deputy Mayor: Jeffery Daniels

Area
  - Total: 3.69 sq mi (9.57 km^{2})
  - Land: 3.69 sq mi (9.56 km^{2})
  - Water: 0.0039 sq mi (0.01 km^{2})

Population (2020)
  - Total: 59,169
  - Density: 16,032/sq mi (6,189.9/km^{2})
- Time zone: UTC-5 (EST)
  - Summer (DST): UTC-4 (EDT)
- ZIP Codes: 11550 (Hempstead); 11553 (Uniondale)
- Area codes: 516, 363
- FIPS code: 36-33139
- GNIS feature ID: 0952574
- Website: villageofhempstead.org

Hempstead is a village located in the Town of Hempstead in Nassau County, on Long Island, in New York, United States. The population was 59,169 at the time of the 2020 census, making it the most populous village in New York.

The Incorporated Village of Hempstead is the site of the seventeenth-century "town spot" from which English and Dutch settlers developed the Town of Hempstead, the Town of North Hempstead, and ultimately what would become Nassau County centuries later. It is the largest community by population in both the Town of Hempstead and Nassau County.

Hofstra University is partially located within the village.

== History ==
=== Foundation ===
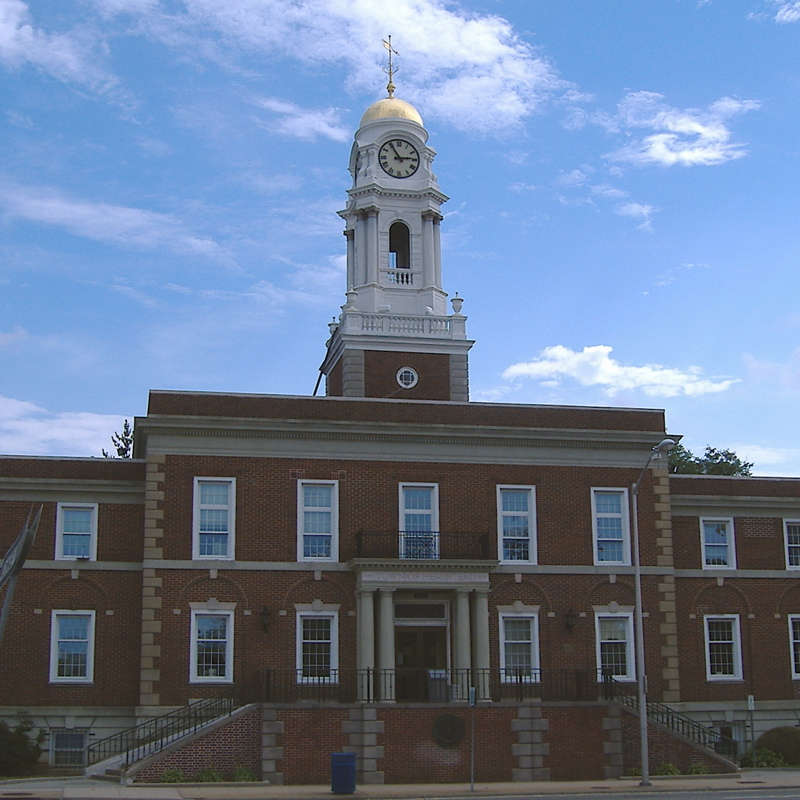
The Town of Hempstead's old Town Hall, located at the corner of Front and Washington streets

The land on which the Village of Hempstead stands was under Dutch control from the early 1620s. In the fall of 1643, two followers of the Presbyterian minister Richard Denton, Robert Fordham and John Carman, crossed Long Island Sound by rowboat to negotiate with the local Native Americans for a tract of land upon which to establish a new community. Representatives of the Marsapeague (Massapequa), Mericock (Merrick), Matinecock and Rekowake (Rockaway) tribes met with the two men at a site slightly west of the current Denton Green in Hempstead Village. Tackapousha, who was the sachem (chief spokesman) of the Marsapeague, was the acknowledged spokesman for conducting the transaction. The Indians sold approximately 64,000 acres (260 km^{2}), the present day towns of Hempstead and North Hempstead, for an unknown quantity of items; a 1657 revisit of this agreement names large and small cattle, stockings, wampum, hatchets, knives, trading cloth, powder, and lead given as payment by the English. Some items may have been valuable to the Native Americans in terms of the contemporary markets for European "trinkets," which may have held symbolic and spiritual importance to Native America peoples in the Northeast.

In the spring of 1644, thirty to forty families left Stamford, Connecticut, crossed Long Island Sound, landed in Hempstead Harbor and eventually made their way to the present site of the village of Hempstead where they began their English settlement within Dutch-controlled New Netherland. The settling of Hempstead marked the beginnings of the oldest English settlement in what is now Nassau County. Subsequent trips across the Sound brought more settlers who prepared a fort here for their mutual protection. These original Hempstead settlers were Puritans in search of a place where they could more freely express their particular brand of Protestantism. They established a Presbyterian church that is the oldest continually active Presbyterian congregation in the nation. In 1843, Benjamin F. Thompson wrote and published a history of the village, and an account of contemporary Hempstead Village. Thompson reported that there were 200 dwellings, and 1,400 residents; that the village was connected to New York City by a turnpike and a railroad; that it had dry soil, excellent water, and pure air; and that it was the principal place of mercantile, and mechanical business, in the county. The village of Hempstead was incorporated on May 6, 1853, becoming the first community in Queens County (Nassau County did not exist as a separate county until 1899) to do so.

=== Rise ===
As the years passed, the population of Hempstead increased, as did its importance and prestige. Between 1703 and 1705, the newly formed St. George's Church received a silver communion service from England's Queen Anne.

During the American Revolution, Hempstead was a center of British sympathizers. The British attempted to occupy Hempstead after the Battle of Long Island, and used St. George's as a headquarters as well as a place to worship. Judge Thomas Jones faulted a lax peace treaty for forcing the evacuation of the loyalists.

In the 19th century, Hempstead became increasingly important as a trading center for Long Island. In 1853, it became the first self-governing incorporated village in the Town of Hempstead. Many prominent families such as the Vanderbilts and the Belmonts built homes here, making Hempstead a center of Long Island society. Hempstead merchants established routes out to outlying farms and served as a distribution point for many firms. Wagons would leave Hempstead loaded with tobacco, candy, and cigarettes and return in a week to restock. Bakeries covered routes from Baldwin to Far Rockaway daily. Butchers ran routes to Seaford, Elmont, Valley Stream, Wantagh, East Meadow, Creedmoor, East Rockaway and Christian Hook. Drugs, medicines, perfumes, extracts, aprons, children's coats and dresses and men's clothes were peddled about the country by Hempstead merchants. People came from all sections of Queens to purchase stoves, and there were few places outside Hempstead where stoves could be purchased. Hempstead was the shopping center for Nassau County and the eastern portion of Queens – those settlements within that county east of Jamaica before 1899, when they separated to form Nassau County, following the creation of the City of Greater New York in 1898.

Hempstead has historically been the center of commercial activity for the eastern counties of Long Island. In Nassau County, all major county roads emanate from this village. During the 18th and 19th centuries, all stagecoaches en route to eastern Long Island from Brooklyn passed through Hempstead. Today, seventeen bus routes and three interstate buses leave from the village every day. In addition, the Hempstead Branch of the Long Island Rail Road has its terminal here. At one time, there were three railroad companies with terminals within the village.

In March 1898, Camp Black was formed on the Hempstead Plains (roughly the shared location of Hempstead and Garden City), in support of the impending Spanish–American War. Camp Black was bounded on the north by Old Country Road, on the west by Clinton Road, and on the south by the Central Line rail. Camp Black was opened on April 29, 1898, as a training facility and a point of embarkation for troops.

Early Long Islanders made their living in agriculture or from the sea. Hempstead, with its central location, became the marketplace for the outlying rural farming communities. It was a natural progression, as the surrounding areas developed from small farms into today's suburbia, that Hempstead Village would remain as the marketplace. Chain department stores, such as Arnold Constable and Abraham & Straus, called Hempstead home for many years. Hempstead's Abraham & Straus was the largest grossing suburban department store in the country during the late 1960s. Hempstead was Nassau's retail center during the 1940s through the 1960s.

=== Decline ===
The advent of regional shopping malls such as the one at nearby Roosevelt Field, the demise of nearby Mitchel Air Force Base in 1961 as well as the changing demographics put the retail trade in the village into a downward spiral that it was unable to recover from during the recessions of the 1970s and 1980s. A plethora of businesses left the village in the 1980s and early 1990s, including Abraham & Straus.

=== Rebound and modern history ===
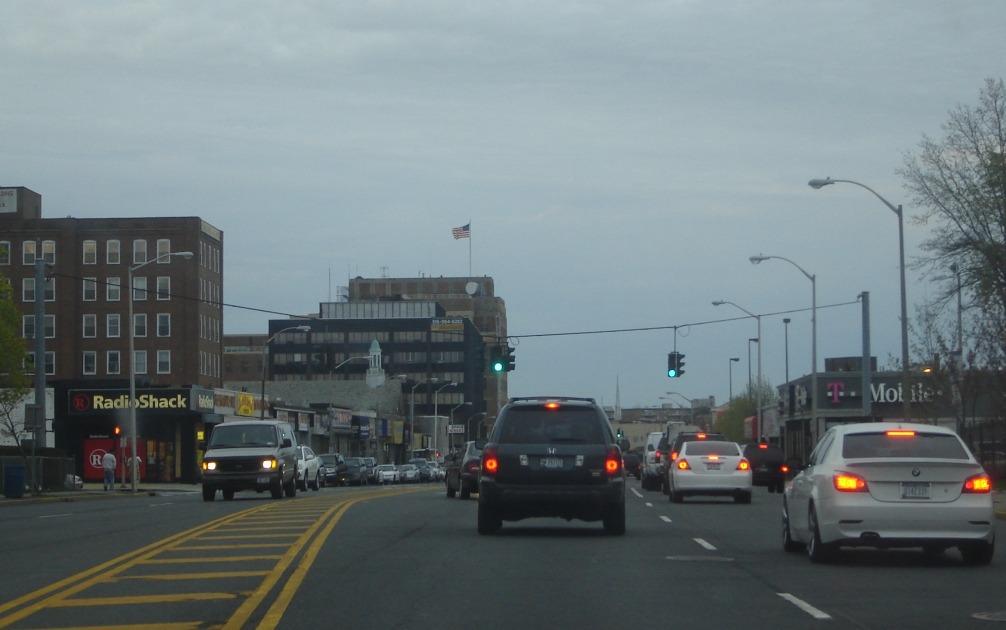
Downtown Hempstead, as seen from eastbound Fulton Street (NY 24)

In the course of the 1990s the village saw redevelopment as a government center as well as business center. There are more government employees from all levels of government in the village than there are in Mineola, the county seat. According to James York, the municipal historian, writing in 1998, the population during the day might rise to nearly 200,000, from a normal census of 50,000. Retailers' interest in the village was rekindled, due to the aggressive revitalization efforts of former Mayor James Garner, who served from 1989 to 2005, and former Community Development Agency Commissioner, Glen Spiritis, who served under Garner's administration. Specifically, two large tracts of retail property have recently undergone redevelopment. The former 8.8-acre (36,000 m^{2}) Times Squares Stores (TSS) property on Peninsula Boulevard and Franklin Street has been redeveloped as Hempstead Village Commons, a 100,000-square-foot (9,300 m^{2}) retail center. The former Abraham & Straus department store on 17 acres (69,000 m^{2}) was eventually also demolished; it was replaced by a large retail development and many other smaller establishments. A considerable infusion of state and federal funding, as well as private investment, have enabled the replacement of blighted storefronts, complete commercial building rehabilitations and the development of affordable housing for the local population.

In 1989, Hempstead residents elected James A. Garner as their mayor. He was the first Black or African-American mayor ever elected to office on Long Island, and he served for four consecutive terms. Subsequently, Wayne Hall – a former Village of Hempstead trustee who is also African American – served as mayor for three terms, from 2005 to 2017.

The first African-American male judge, Lance Clarke, was elected in 2001. Cynthia Diaz-Wilson was the first female justice in the Village of Hempstead and first African American village justice in the state of New York.

The replacement of the 1913 Long Island Rail Road Hempstead Terminal with a modern facility was completed in 2002, and a four-story, 112-unit building for senior housing – with retail on the ground level – was completed at Main and West Columbia Streets four years prior, in January 1998. 32 units of affordable townhouses, known as Patterson Mews – located at Henry Street and Baldwin Road – was completed and fully occupied in 1997.

In recent years, there has been concern regarding ongoing gang activity in certain neighborhoods, notably the "Heights", in addition to the issue of illegal rentals (homes/apartments that are illegally-subdivided by slumlords) and racial steering. Hempstead was also one of the first Long Island communities to contend with the Salvadoran gang, MS-13. The continual intra-violence this gang has exhibited has led to the formation of their arch-rivals, "SWP" or "Salvadorans with Pride". These issues have contributed to Hempstead's high crime rate as compared to other communities in the area.

A 2019 investigation by Newsday revealed widespread racial discrimination by real estate agents on Long Island, including within Hempstead.

=== Etymology ===
Hempstead may have been named after Hemel Hempstead in the English county of Hertfordshire, where village founder John Carman was born. Another theory regarding the origin of the village's name is that it is derived from the town of Heemstede in the Netherlands, as this was an area from which many Dutch settlers of New Netherland originated.

In 1664, the new settlement adopted the Duke's Laws, an austere set of laws that became the basis upon which the laws of many colonies were to be founded. For a time, Hempstead became known as "Old Blue," as a result of the blue laws.

== Geography ==
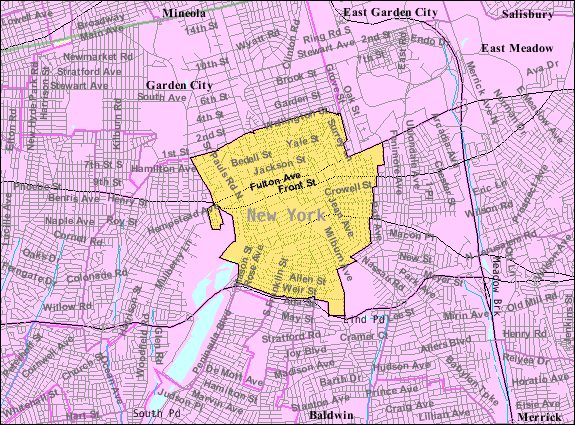
U.S. census map of Hempstead

According to the United States Census Bureau, the village has a total area of 3.7 square miles (9.5 km^{2}), all land.

The Village of Hempstead differs from the majority of Nassau County as its population density is about 15,000 people per square mile—almost four times that of its neighbor on its northern border, Garden City.

=== Climate ===
According to the Köppen climate classification, Hempstead has a Humid subtropical climate (type Cfa) with cool, wet winters and hot, humid summers. Precipitation is uniform throughout the year, with slight spring and fall peaks.

Climate data for Hempstead, New York, 1991–2020 normals, extremes 1999–present
Month	Jan	Feb	Mar	Apr	May	Jun	Jul	Aug	Sep	Oct	Nov	Dec	Year
Record high °F (°C)	71 (22)	73 (23)	85 (29)	94 (34)	97 (36)	103 (39)	105 (41)	104 (40)	100 (38)	90 (32)	83 (28)	76 (24)	105 (41)
Mean daily maximum °F (°C)	39 (4)	43 (6)	50 (10)	61 (16)	70 (21)	80 (27)	85 (29)	83 (28)	76 (24)	65 (18)	55 (13)	45 (7)	63 (17)
Mean daily minimum °F (°C)	26 (−3)	28 (−2)	34 (1)	42 (6)	51 (11)	61 (16)	66 (19)	65 (18)	58 (14)	48 (9)	40 (4)	31 (−1)	46 (8)
Record low °F (°C)	−10 (−23)	−7 (−22)	3 (−16)	13 (−11)	32 (0)	43 (6)	50 (10)	48 (9)	38 (3)	27 (−3)	10 (−12)	−1 (−18)	−10 (−23)
Average precipitation inches (mm)	3.62 (92)	3.17 (81)	4.35 (110)	4.15 (105)	3.90 (99)	3.85 (98)	4.40 (112)	3.72 (94)	3.91 (99)	4.08 (104)	3.73 (95)	3.82 (97)	46.7 (1,186)
Source: The Weather Channel

==== Plant zone ====
According to the United States Department of Agriculture (USDA), Garden City is within hardiness zone 7b.

== Demographics ==
Historical population
Census	Pop.	Note	%±
1870	2,316		—
1880	2,521		8.9%
1890	4,831		91.6%
1900	3,582		−25.9%
1910	4,964		38.6%
1920	6,382		28.6%
1930	12,650		98.2%
1940	20,856		64.9%
1950	29,135		39.7%
1960	34,641		18.9%
1970	39,411		13.8%
1980	40,404		2.5%
1990	49,453		22.4%
2000	56,554		14.4%
2010	53,891		−4.7%
2020	59,169		9.8%
U.S. Decennial Census

=== 2020 census ===
Hempstead village, New York – Racial and ethnic composition Note: the US Census treats Hispanic/Latino as an ethnic category. This table excludes Latinos from the racial categories and assigns them to a separate category. Hispanics/Latinos may be of any race.
Race / Ethnicity (NH = Non-Hispanic)	Pop 1970	Pop 1980	Pop 1990	Pop 2000	Pop 2010	Pop 2020	% 1970	% 1980	% 1990	% 2000	% 2010	% 2020
White alone (NH)	24,905	13,919	11,256	7,460	3,548	3,067	63.19%	34.45%	22.76%	13.19%	6.58%	5.18%
Black or African American alone (NH)	14,111	22,495	27,693	28,729	24,724	23,041	35.80%	55.68%	56.00%	50.80%	45.88%	38.94%
Native American or Alaska Native alone (NH)	52	80	159	184	96	147	0.13%	0.20%	0.32%	0.33%	0.18%	0.25%
Asian alone (NH)	189	261	751	736	704	1,242	0.48%	0.65%	1.52%	1.30%	1.31%	2.10%
Native Hawaiian or Pacific Islander alone (NH)	189	261	751	19	13	17	0.48%	0.65%	1.52%	0.03%	0.02%	0.03%
Other race alone (NH)	154	36	140	185	221	621	0.39%	0.09%	0.28%	0.33%	0.41%	1.05%
Mixed race or Multiracial (NH)	x	x	x	1,250	762	1,394	x	x	x	2.21%	1.41%	2.36%
Hispanic or Latino (any race)	x	3,613	9,454	17,991	23,823	29,640	x	8.94%	19.12%	31.81%	44.21%	50.09%
Total	39,411	40,404	49,453	56,554	53,891	59,169	100.00%	100.00%	100.00%	100.00%	100.00%	100.00%

=== 2010 census ===
As of the census of 2010, there were 53,891 people, 15,234 households, and 10,945 families residing in the village. The racial makeup of the village was 21.9% White, 44.2% Hispanic, 48.3% Black or African American, 0.6% Native American, 1.4% Asian, 0.0% Pacific Islander, 22.8% from other races, and 5.0% from two or more races.

There were 16,034 households, out of which 38.7% had children under the age of 18 living with them, 39.0% were married couples living together, 27.0% had a female householder with no husband present, and 26.4% were non-families. 20.8% of all households were made up of individuals, and 6.7% had someone living alone who was 65 years of age or older. The average household size was 3.41 and the average family size was 3.76.

In the village, the population was spread out, with 26.2% under the age of 18, 16.3% from 18 to 24, 31.4% from 25 to 44, 17.5% from 45 to 64, and 8.5% who were 65 years of age or older. The median age was 29 years. For every 100 females, there were 91.6 males. For every 100 females age 18 and over, there were 86.4 males.

The median income for a household in the village was $45,234 and the median income for a family was $46,675. Males had a median income of $29,493 versus $27,507 for females. The per capita income for the village was $15,735. About 14.4% of families and 17.7% of the population were below the poverty line, including 20.7% of those under age 18 and 16.9% of those age 65 or over.

== Government ==
As of August 2022, the Mayor of Hempstead is Waylyn Hobbs, Jr, the Deputy Mayor is Jeffery Daniels, and the Village Trustees are Kevin Boone, Noah Burroughs, Jeffery Daniels, and Clariona D. Griffith.

In the 2024 U.S. presidential election, the majority of Hempstead voters voted for Kamala D. Harris (D).

== Education ==
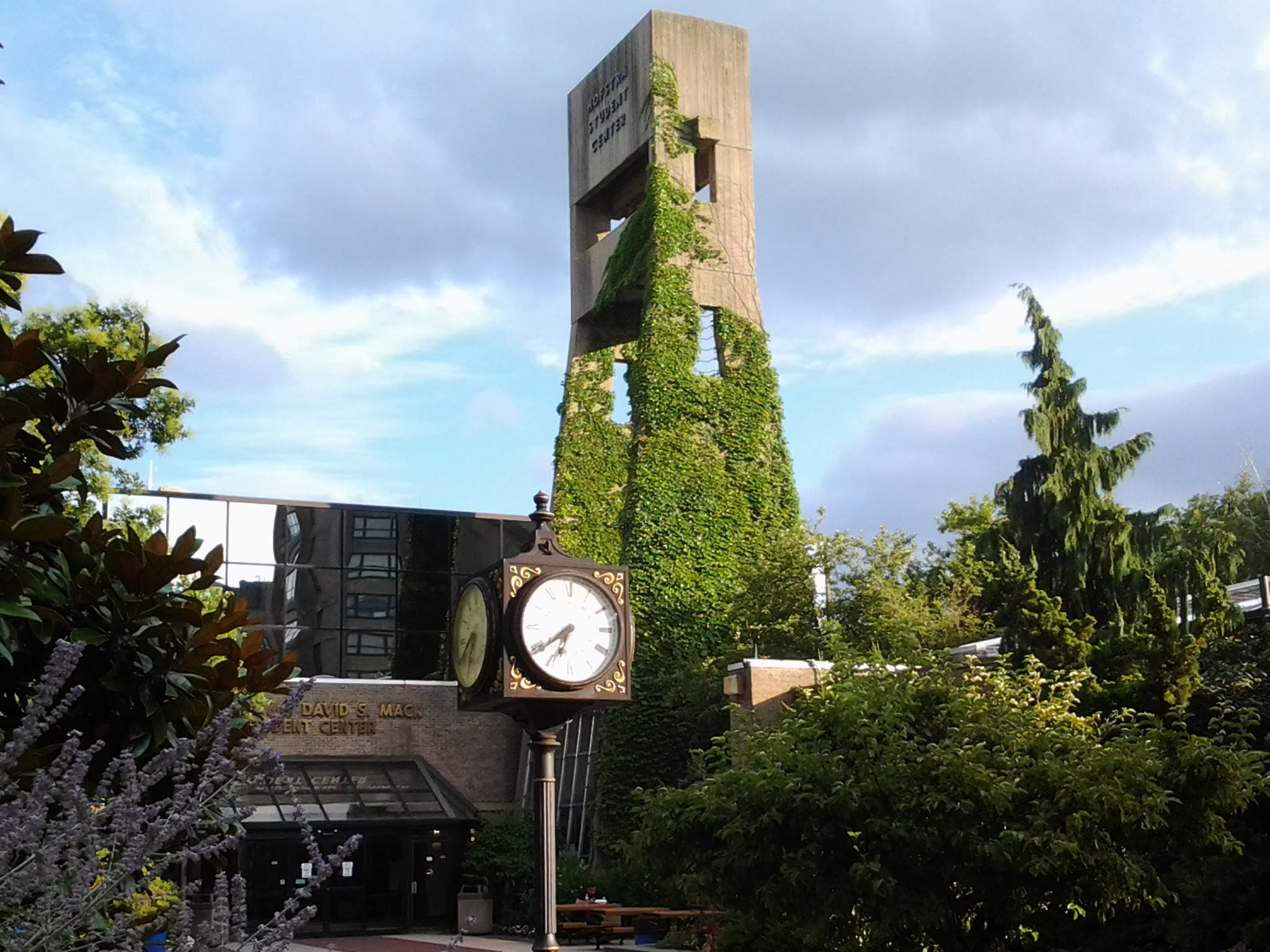
The Mack Student Center at Hofstra University, partially located within the village

=== Primary and secondary education ===
The community is served by the Hempstead Union Free School District. Students attend Alverta B. Gray-Schultz Middle School and Hempstead High School for their secondary years of K-12 education.

There is one private high school in Hempstead: Sacred Heart Academy – a private, all-girls Catholic school.

There are two charter schools located within the village: the Academy Charter School and Evergreen Charter School.

=== Higher education ===
Hofstra University's campus is partially located within the Village of Hempstead; it is split between Hempstead and its unincorporated neighbor, Uniondale.

== Transportation ==
The Rosa Parks Hempstead Transit Center is one of the largest hubs in Nassau County. It serves as the terminus of the Long Island Rail Road's Hempstead Branch, and is served by a number of Nassau Inter-County Express routes.

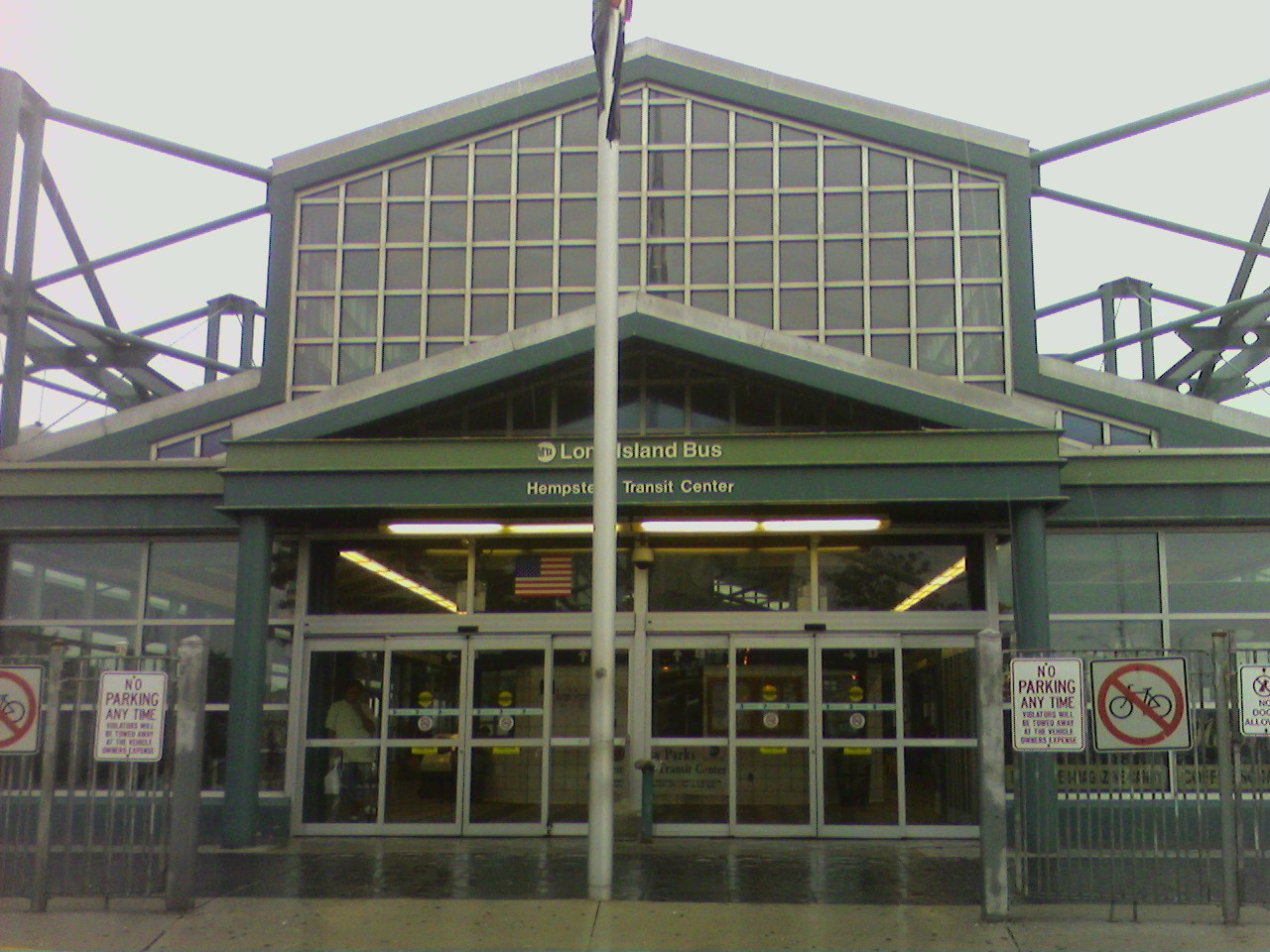
The bus terminal at the Rosa Parks Hempstead Transit Center

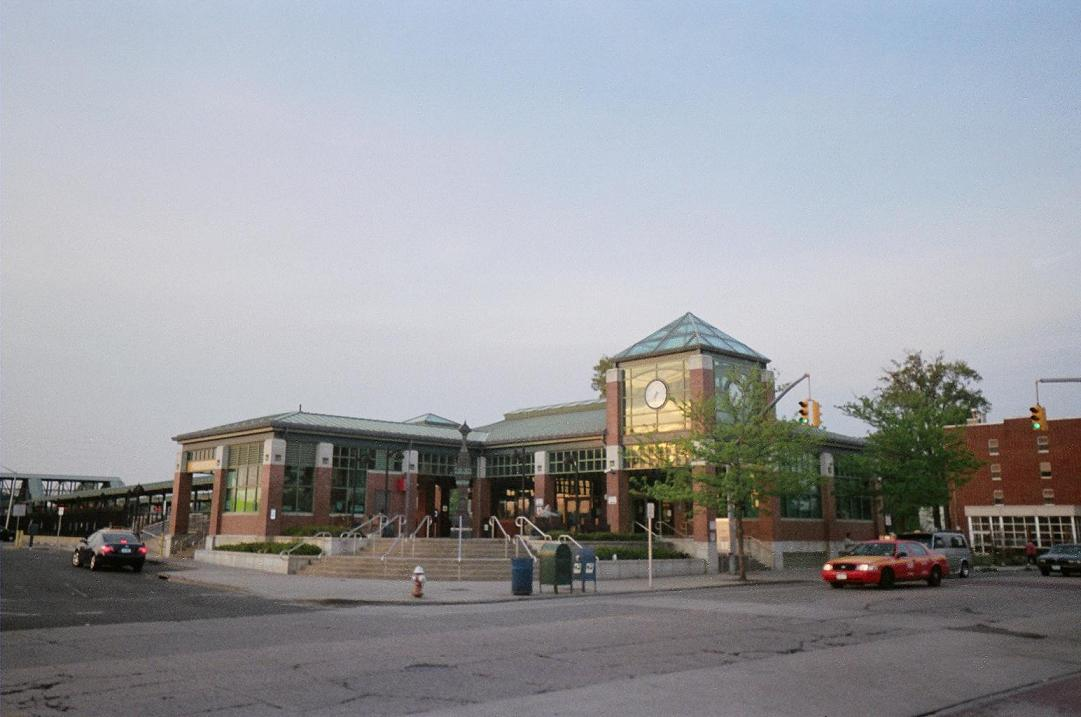
The LIRR terminal at the Rosa Parks Hempstead Transit Center

List of Nassau Inter-County Express bus routes serving Hempstead:
Bus route number	Runs to / from	Notes
n6	Hempstead; Jamaica, Queens	
n6X	Hempstead; Jamaica, Queens	Express Service.
n15	Roosevelt Field Mall; Long Beach; Mineola	
n16	Nassau Community College; Rockville Centre	
n16C	Nassau Community College; Rockville Centre	
n27	Hempstead; Glen Cove	
n31	Hempstead; Far Rockaway, Queens	Via. West Broadway.
n31x	Hempstead; Far Rockaway, Queens	Via Peninsula Blvd
n32	Hempstead; Far Rockaway, Queens	Via. Central Avenue.
n35	Westbury; Baldwin Harbor	
n40	Mineola; Freeport	Via. North Main Street.
n40X	Mineola; Freeport; Baldwin	Via. North Main Street.
n41	Hempstead; Freeport	Via. North Main St
n48	Hempstead; Hicksville	Via. Carmans Road.
n49	Hempstead; Hicksville	Via. Newbridge Road.
n54	Hempstead; Sunrise Mall	Via. Jerusalem Ave / Washington Ave.
n55	Hempstead; Sunrise Mall	Via. Jerusalem Ave / Broadway.
n70	Hempstead; SUNY Farmingdale	

== Points of interest ==
- Hofstra University
- Hofstra University Arboretum
- Hempstead Bus Terminal
- Nassau County African American Museum
- St. George's Episcopal Church
- Christ's First Presbyterian Church – First Presbyterian church established in the US

== Notable people ==
Residents (native or lived) about whom an article exists, by date of birth:

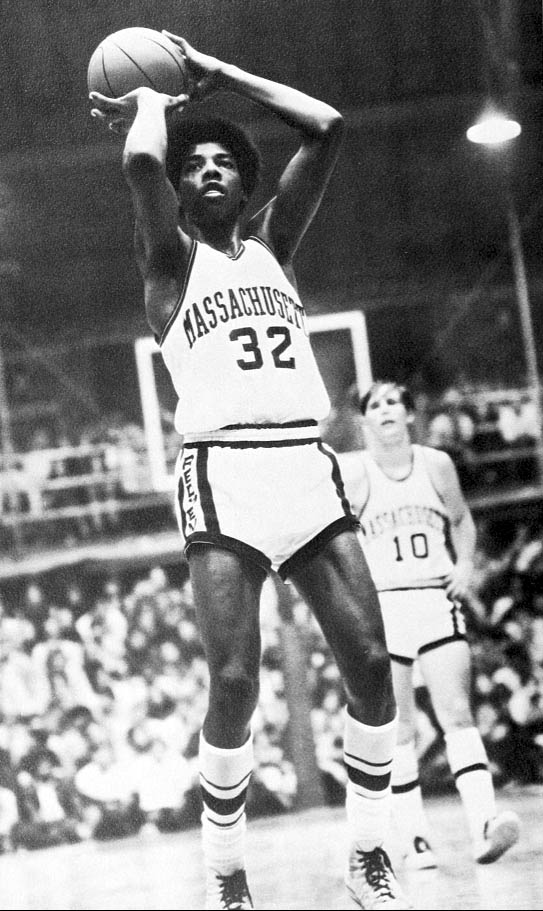
Julius Erving

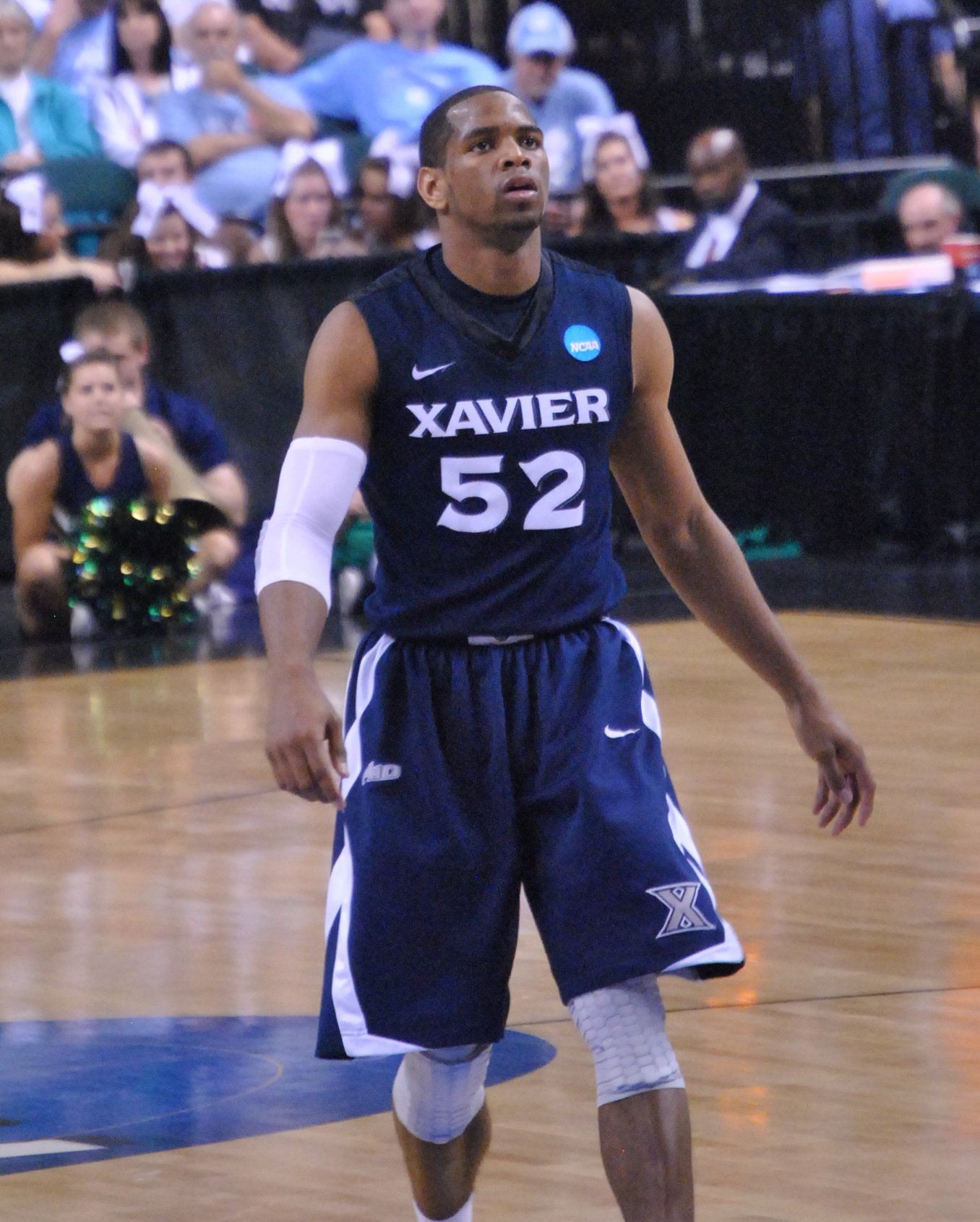
Tu Holloway

- Thomas Truxtun (1755-1822), sea captain, U.S. Navy officer; born in Hempstead
- Samuel L. Mitchill (1764–1831), physician, naturalist, and politician; born in Hempstead
- Walt Whitman (1819–1892; resident 1836–1838), poet, essayist, journalist, and humanist
- William S. Hofstra (1861–1932), entrepreneur
- Christopher Morley (1890–1957; resident during the 1910s), journalist, novelist, essayist, and poet
- Frank Field (1923–2023), television meteorologist
- Francis E. Dec (1926–1996), disbarred lawyer and outsider writer
- Joe Tex (1935–1982), singer
- Walter Hudson (1944–1991; life resident), 4th most obese human, Guinness World Record for the largest waist
- Julius Erving (born 1950), basketball star, lived in the village of Hempstead as a child for at least two or three years from around 1953 to 1955 or 1956
- Sheryl Lee Ralph (born 1956), actress and singer
- Eric "Vietnam" Sadler (born 1960; native 1960–87, music producer, Public Enemy, Ice Cube, Slick Rick, Bell Biv Devoe, Vanessa Williams)
- Rob Moore (born 1968; native), NFL football player
- Method Man (born 1971), rapper, songwriter, record producer, and actor; spent his childhood living between Hempstead and Staten Island
- Trevor Tahim "Busta Rhymes" Smith, Jr. (born 1972), resident, rapper, producer, and actor
- Prodigy (1974–2017; native), member of hip-hop duo Mobb Deep
- Craig "Speedy" Claxton (born 1978; native), NBA basketball player
- Tavorris Bell (born 1978), Harlem Globetrotter
- Roc Marciano (born 1978), rapper and producer
- The Product G&B, hip hop/R&B vocal duo consisting of David McRae (also known as Sincere Gubano) and Marvin Moore-Hough (also known as Money Harm), both born circa 1980
- Scott Lipsky (born 1981), tennis player
- Hykiem Coney (1982–2006), anti-gang activist
- A+ (born 1982; native and childhood), rapper, made albums in 1996 and 1999 during his school years
- Tu Holloway (born 1989), basketball player for Maccabi Rishon LeZion in the Israeli Basketball Premier League.

== See also ==
- List of municipalities in New York
- South Hempstead
- West Hempstead
- Suburban Technical School
