= Marshall Roberts Collection =

Art collection owned by Marshall Owen Roberts

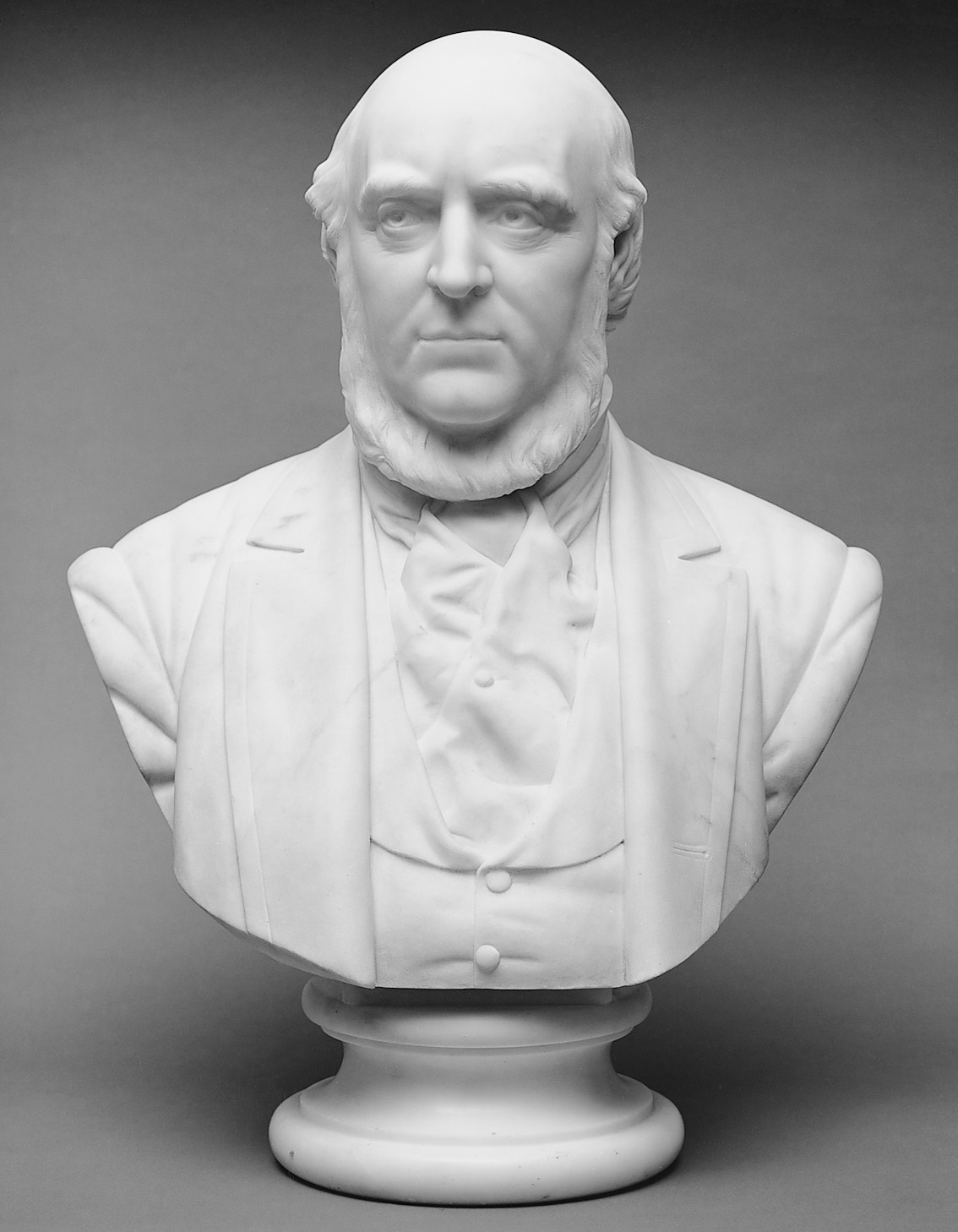
An 1884 bust of Roberts by Ames Van Wart, his son-in-law

The Art Collection of Marshall Owen Roberts was a collection of sculptures, antiques and paintings owned by New York industrialist Marshall Owen Roberts. The collection, which featured many prominent American artists and works, including Emanuel Leutze's Washington Crossing the Delaware, remained intact following his 1880 death until it was auctioned off in 1897.

== History ==
Roberts was a noted art collector and staunch supporter of American artists who never sold or exchanged a painting after he bought it. He was considered the prototypical New York City patron, like Gilpin in Philadelphia and Harrison Gray Otis in Boston. He "made no pretensions to connoisseurship, but was guided in his purchases simply by fancy, or with a view to assisting some needy artist." Roberts served on the Metropolitan Museum of Art's Board of Trustees in 1870 and 1871, and lent some of his paintings to the Metropolitan Fair Picture Gallery in 1864 held at the Fourteenth Street Armory.

Roberts formed his collection of 335 paintings at a time when the Düsseldorf School of German genre paintings were the fashion and the canvases which told human stories were most worthy of attention.

His best-known acquisition is Emanuel Leutze's 1851 painting Washington Crossing the Delaware, (Note: Roberts kept Emanuel Leutze's Washington Crossing the Delaware, which he acquired the early 1860s, in a fixed frame which occupied the entire eastern wall of the gallery. It was noted in the catalog of the sale that the purchaser of the painting "will be obliged to remove it from its position in the gallery at his own risk and expense." It was purchased by John Stewart Kennedy for $16,100 (equivalent to $623,000 in 2025) who donated it to the Metropolitan Museum of Art.) which he bought for $10,000 (at the time, an enormous sum). Roberts built an art gallery, attached to his home, 107 Fifth Avenue (at the southeast corner of 18th Street), where he displayed his collection, which included Rembrandt Peale's Babes in the Wood, Daniel Huntington's Venice, Good Samaritan and Old Lawyer, Frederic Edwin Church's Rainy Season in the Tropics (Note: Frederick Stuart Church's Rainy Season in the Tropics sold for $1,550 (equivalent to $60,000 in 2025) to S.O. Wright & Co., presumably for a customer.) and Coast of Maine, Régis François Gignoux's Hawk's Nest, West Virginia, (Note: Régis François Gignoux's Hawk's Nest, West Virginia was considered by The New York Times in 1897 to be "the best landscape that Gignoux ever painted, and which, even with its defects and its indices of an art school long dead, can be studied with pleasure for its lovely light, good distance, and soft color.") Richard Caton Woodville's War News from Mexico, Asher Brown Durand's Indian Rescue, Schaeffele's Marie de Medici's Visit to Ruben's Studio, Johann Georg Meyer's First Lesson, Constant Troyon's After the Hunt, Paul Falconer Poole's Pension Agent, Charles Verlat's Sheep in Pasture, Paul Delaroche's Napoleon at Fontainbleau, Ernest Meissonier's The Smoker (1849) Thomas Sidney Cooper's Monarch of the Plain, Édouard Frère's Mother and Infant and The Industrious Mother, John Frederick Kensett's Noon by the Sea Shore (Note: John Frederick Kensett's 1863 Noon by the Sea Shore was a scene of the cliff walk at Newport, painted long before that walk had become the formal and aristocratic path that it became. It was later owned by Samuel P. Avery, Jr.) and Franconia Notch, Henry Peters Gray's Rose of Fiesole and Just Fifteen, George A. Baker's Love at First Sight, Wild Flowers and Children of the Wood, John George Brown's His First Cigar, Thomas Cole's Old Mill, James McDougal Hart's Old Homestead and Morning in the Adirondacks, William Henry Powell's Landing of the Pilgrims, William Sidney Mount's Raffling for a Goose, Robert Swain Gifford's On The St. Lawrence and View of Quebec, Eugene Benson's Thoughts in Exile, Thomas Sully's Woman at the Well and A Girl Offering Flowers at a Shrine, Seymour Joseph Guy's A Field Daisy and Good Sister, Charles Loring Elliott's Portrait of Himself, and George Henry Boughton's Gypsy Women, Jean-Léon Gérôme's The Egyptian Conscript, James Augustus Suydam's On the Beach, Charles Baugniet's Dressing for the Ball, Benjamin Vautier's The Letter, as well as works by M. H. Koekkoek Édouard Detaille.

In addition to the 1876 Indian Vase by his son-in-law Ames Van Wart, Robert's collection included 1,000 different numbers in bronze, art objects and furnishings. His sculptures included Erastus Dow Palmer's medallion base-reliefs Night and Morning, Franklin Simmons's The Promised Land, and Voso's Cupid and Psyche.

=== Auction of collection ===
Roberts died on September 11, 1880, while in Saratoga Springs, New York. The entire collection was left to his widow, the former Sarah Lawrence "Susan" Endicott. At the time of his death, it was reported that he had spent $600,000 (equivalent to $20,017,000 in 2025) on the collection which was then worth over $750,000 (equivalent to $25,022,000 in 2025). In 1892, Susan remarried Ralph Vivian of Claverton Manor They moved to London and the collection remained in the Fifth Avenue home, which remained unoccupied other than during the winter of 1893 to 1894 when Cornelius and Alice Gwynne Vanderbilt leased the mansion while they were expanded their chateau at Fifth Avenue and 57th Street.

In 1897, Susan hired Messrs. Ortgies & Co. of the Fifth Avenue Art Galleries, under the management of Samuel P. Avery, Jr., to auction off the entire collection. The auction of the paintings took place at Chickering Hall on the evenings of January 19, 20, and 21, 1897. The statuary, art objects, and other furnishings were auctioned off from the Fifth Avenue home on January 18 and 22.

In total, $41,754 (equivalent to $1,616,000 in 2025) was received for the sale of 172 pictures, $8,764 during the first night's sale and $32,990 the following night at Chickering Hall. The Roberts home on Fifth Avenue was sold and in July 1901, architect Robert Maynicke filed plans for a new eleven-story building to be erected by Henry Corn on the site of the home. The new building, extant today at 105 Fifth Avenue, was the original location of the Barnes & Noble chain of bookstores from 1932 to 2014.

== Collection ==
Paintings

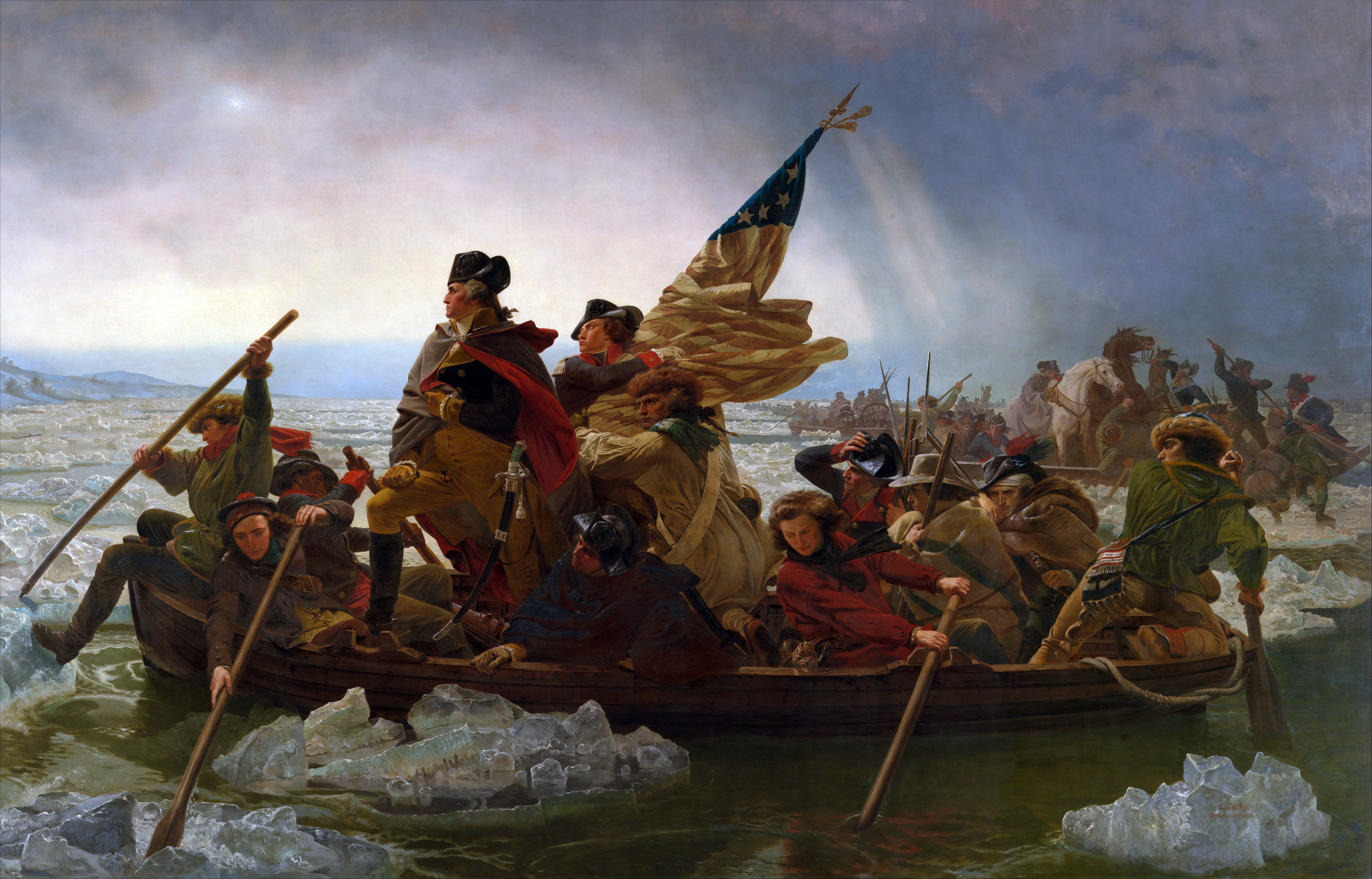
Washington Crossing the Delaware by Emanuel Leutze, 1851

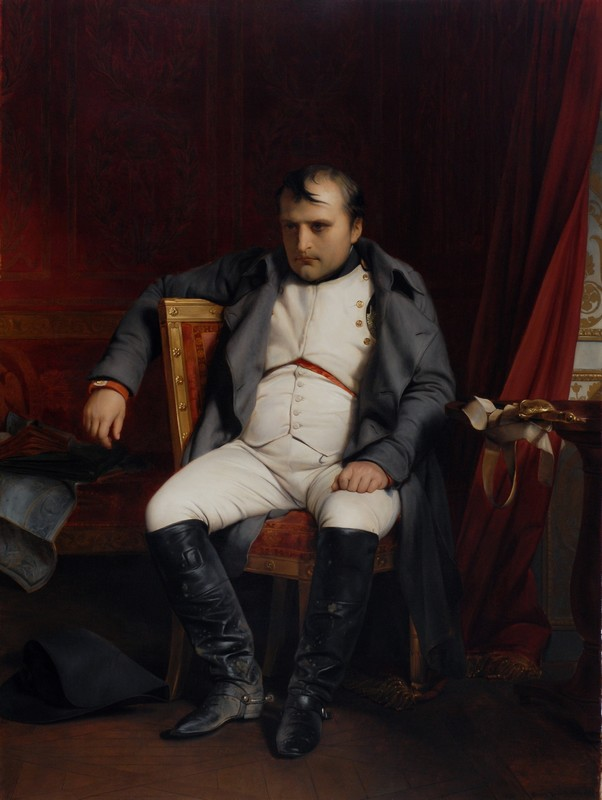
Napoléon à Fontainebleau by Paul Delaroche, 1840

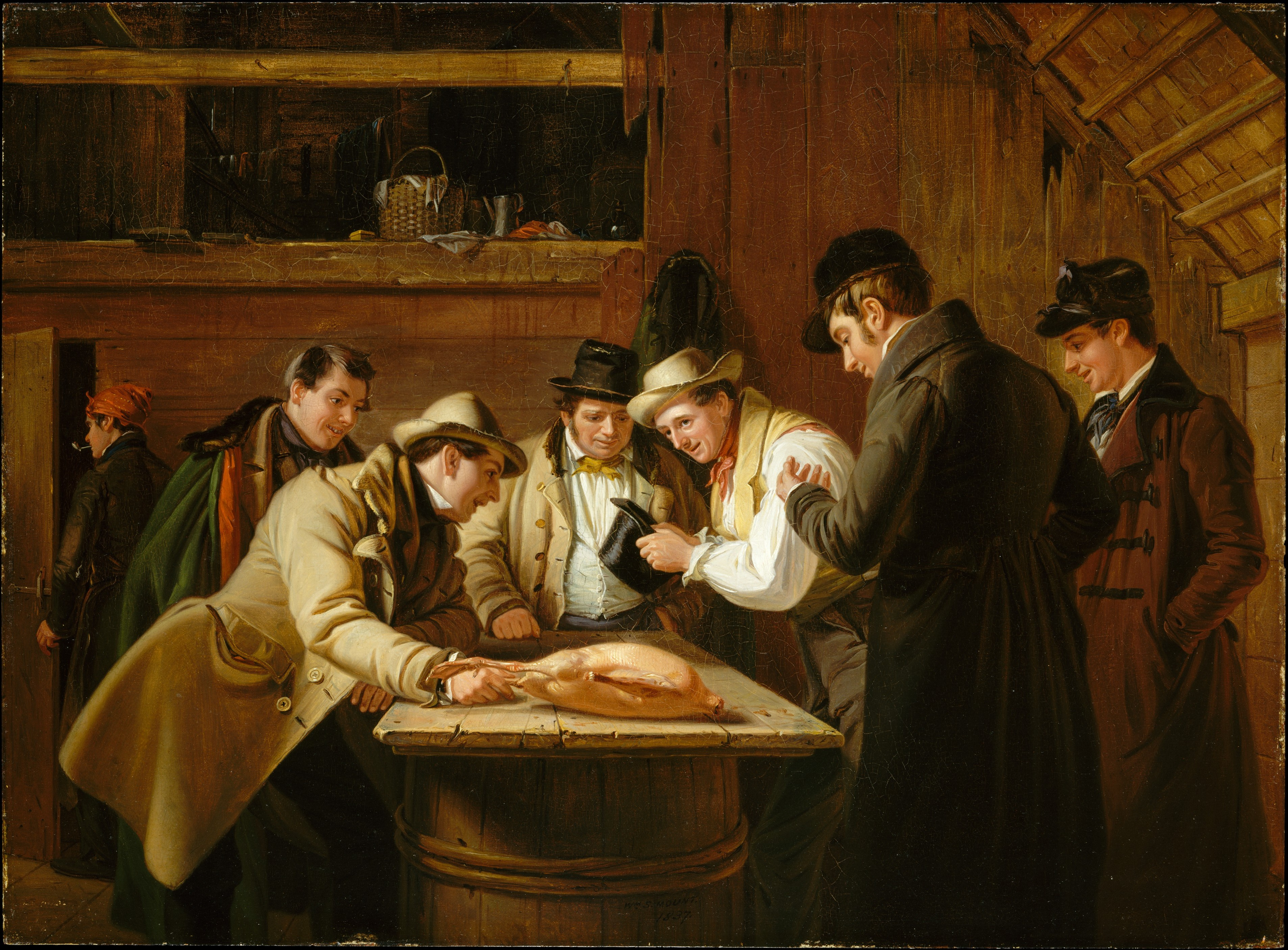
Raffling for the Goose by William Sidney Mount, 1837

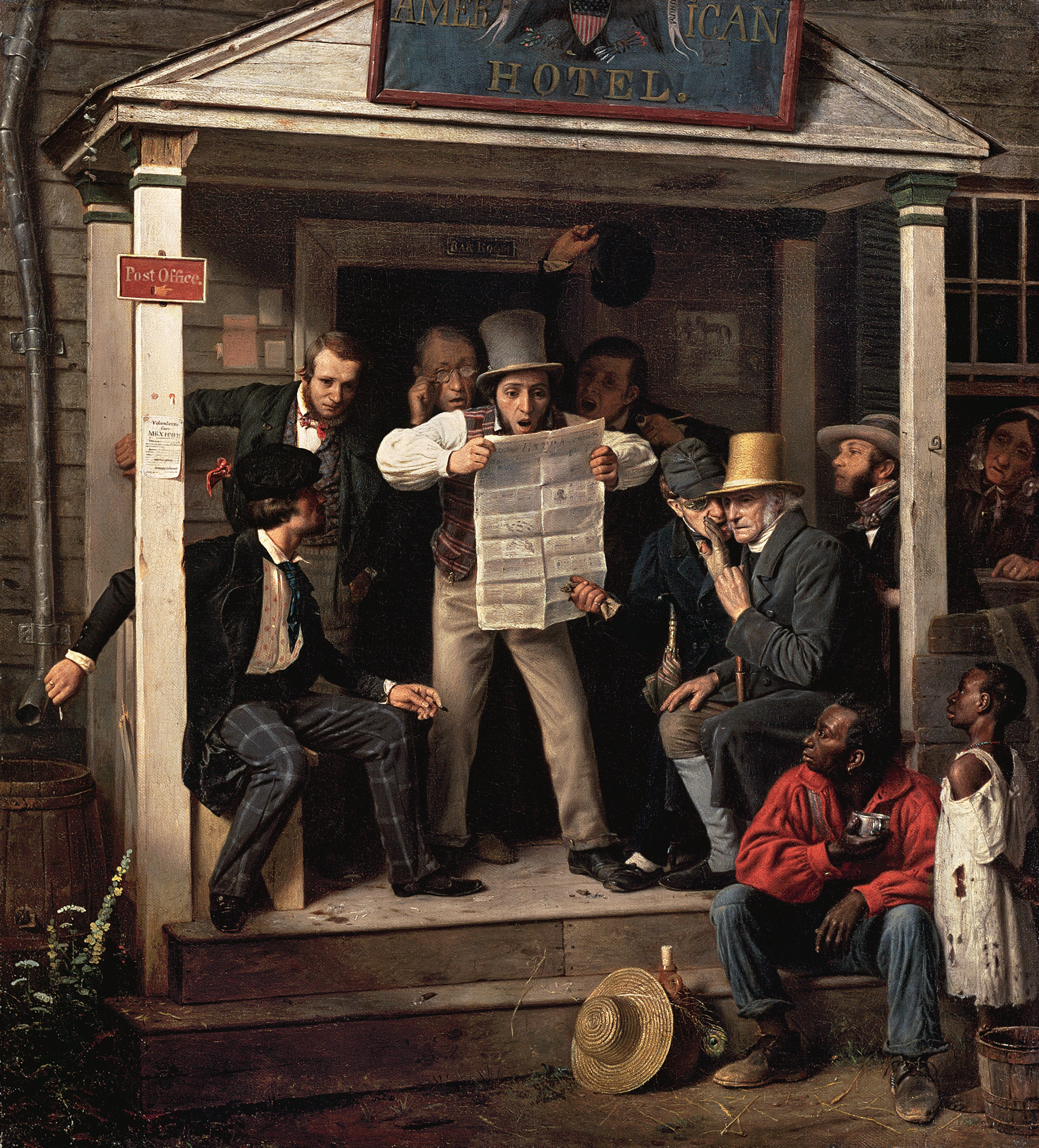
War News from Mexico by Richard Caton Woodville, 1848

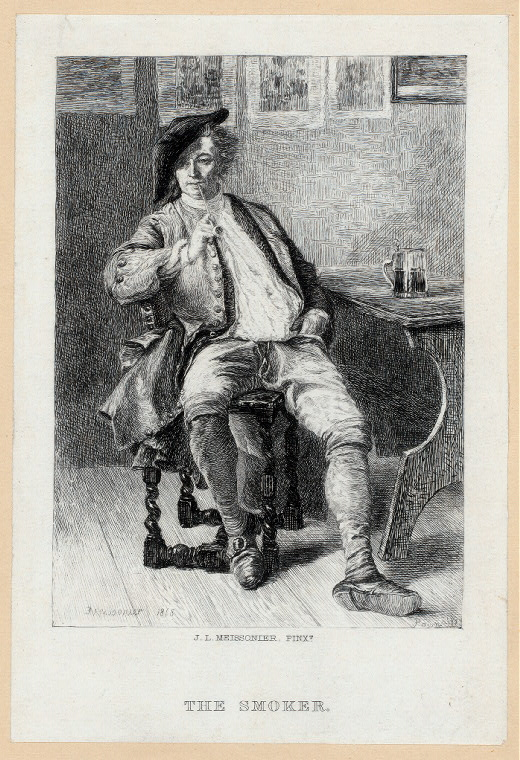
The Smoker by Ernest Meissonier

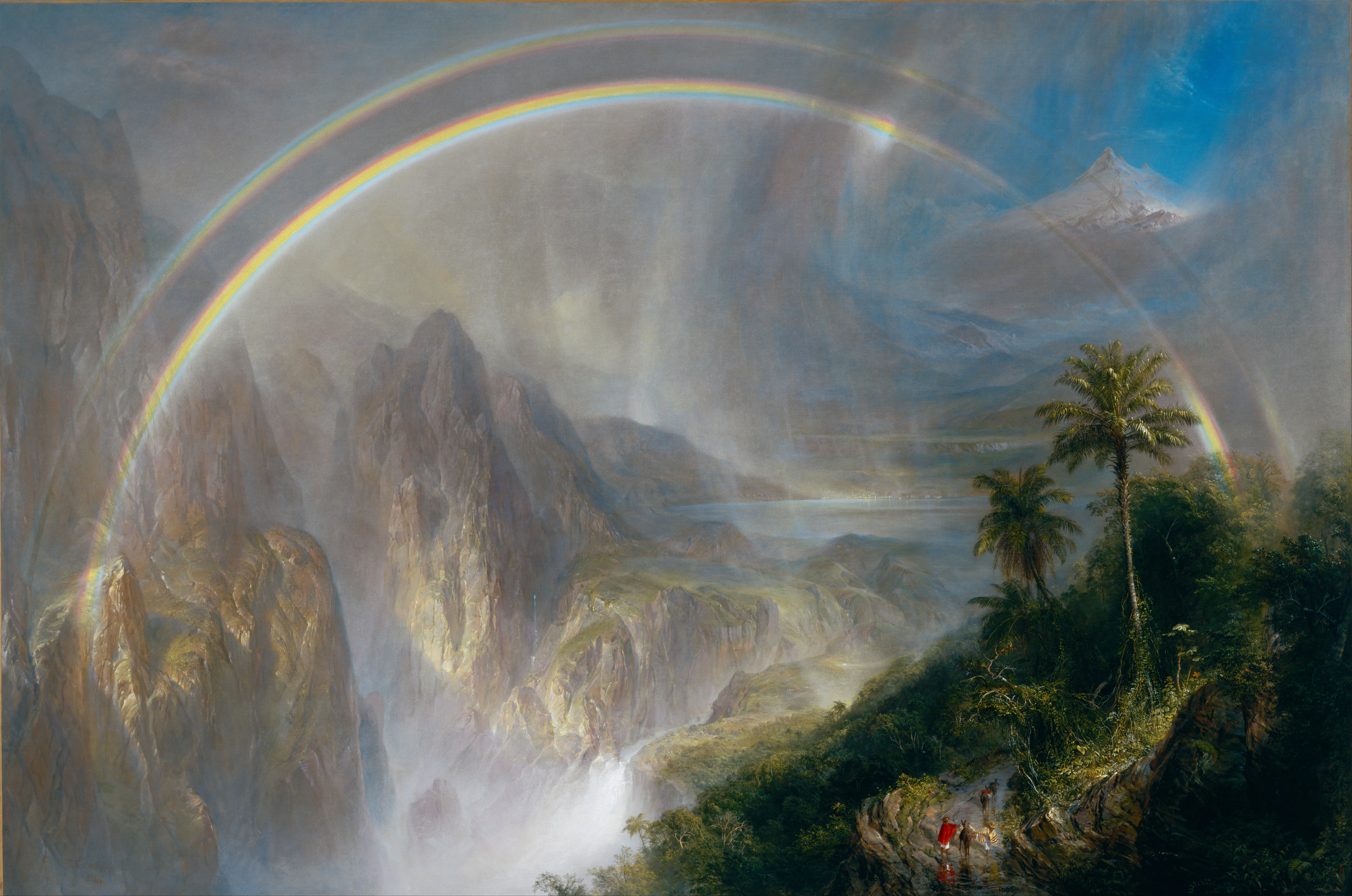
Rainy Season in the Tropics by Frederic Edwin Church, 1866

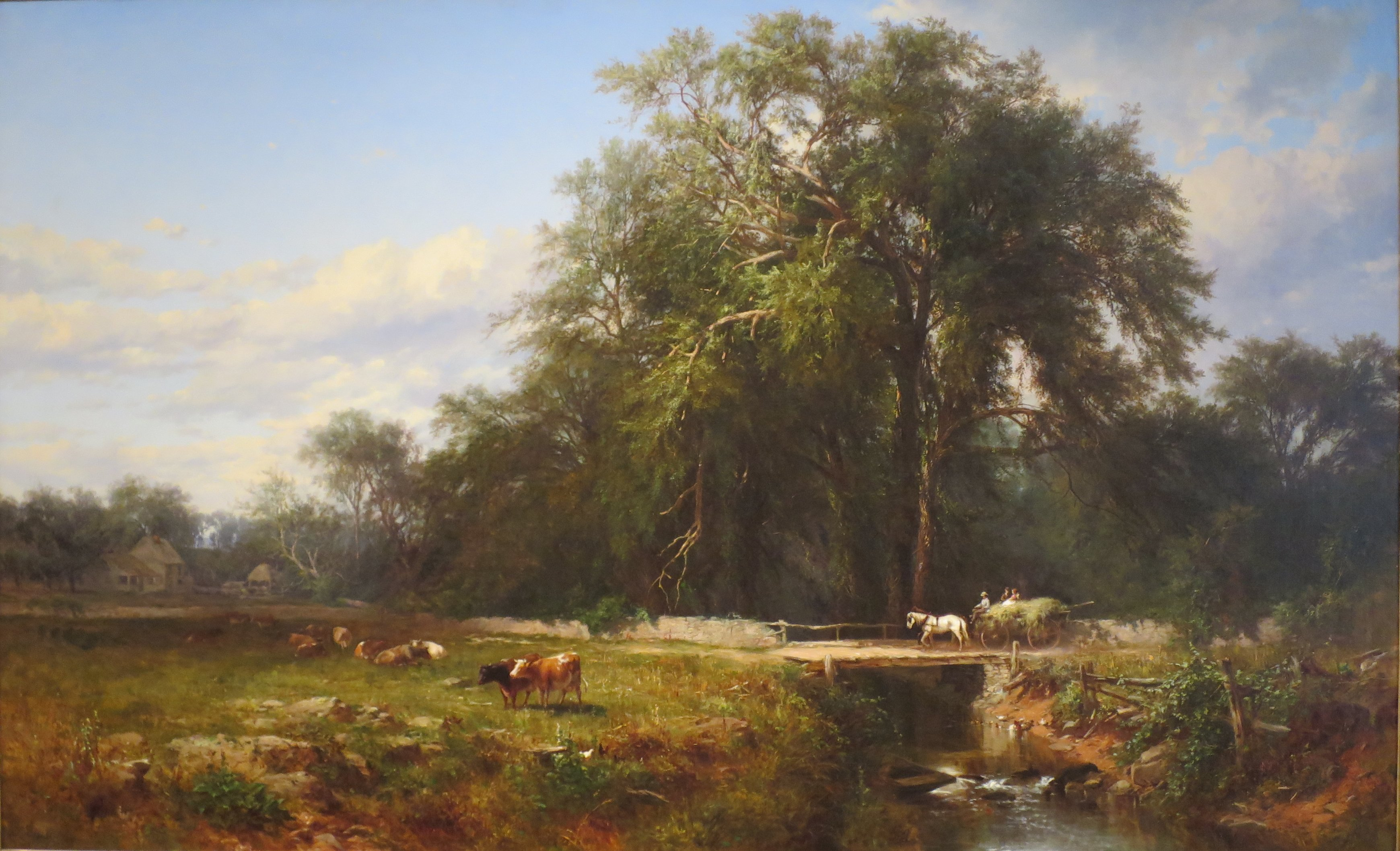
The Old Homestead by James McDougal Hart, 1862

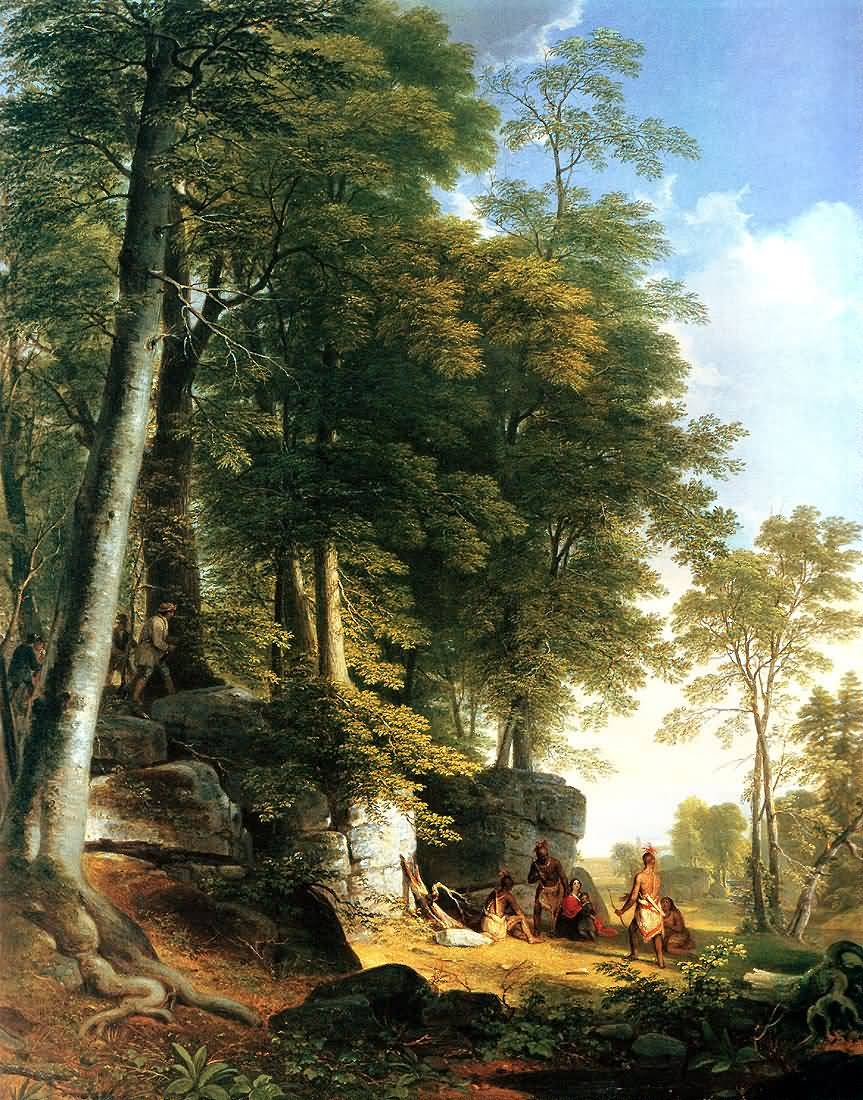
Indian Rescue by Asher Brown Durand

Sculpture and pottery

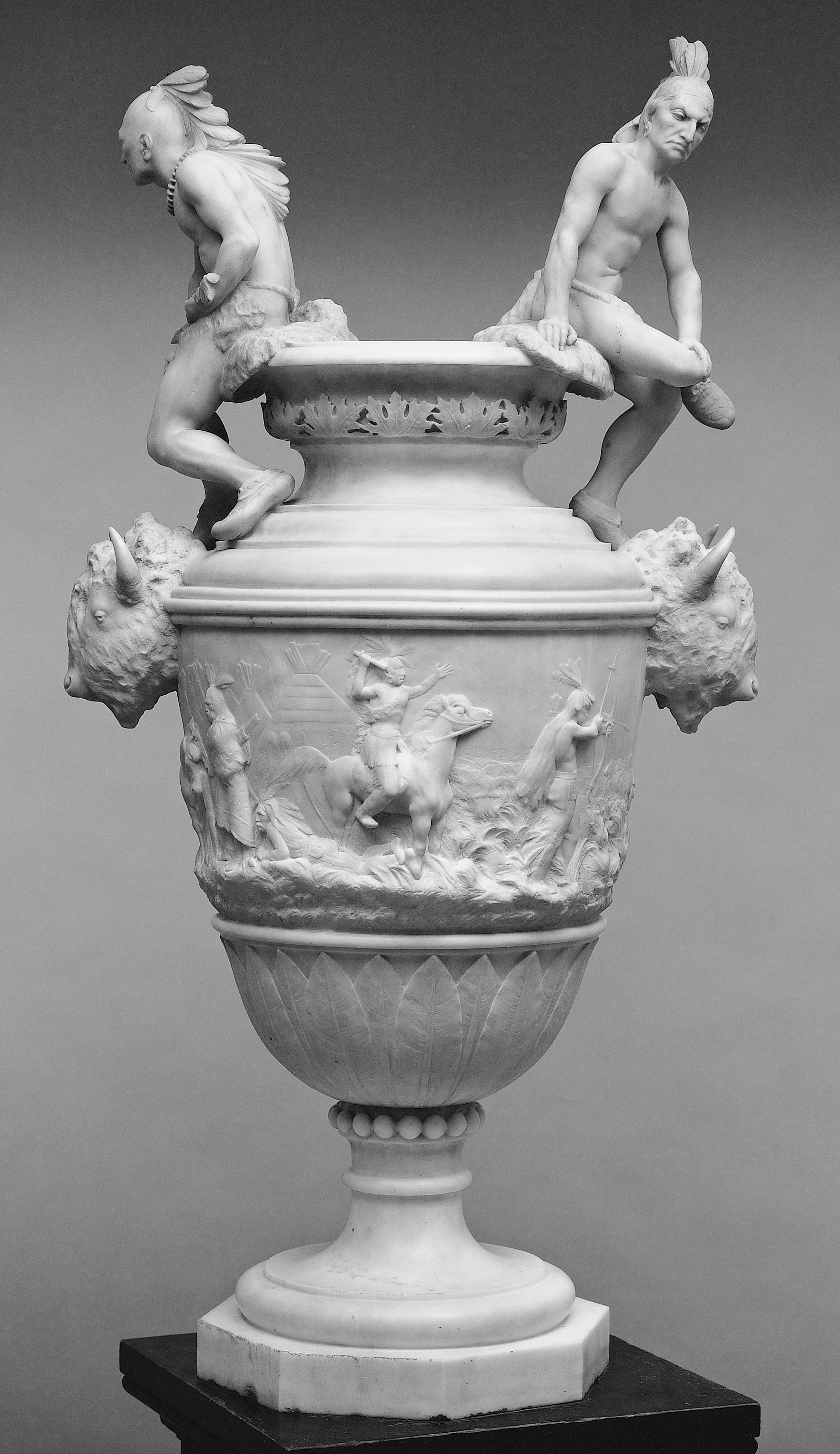
Indian Vase by Ames Van Wart, 1876

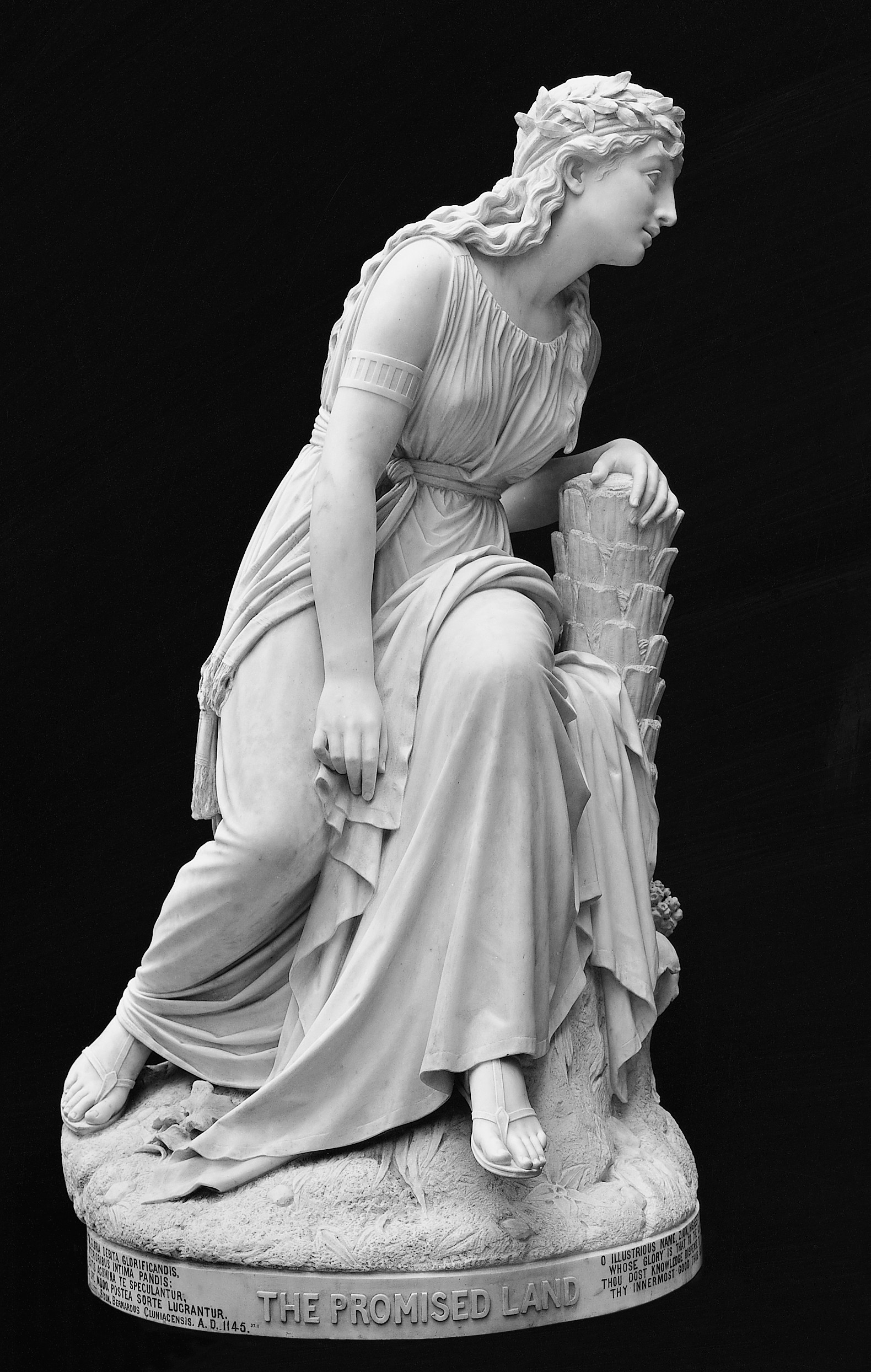
The Promised Land by Franklin Simmons, carved 1874

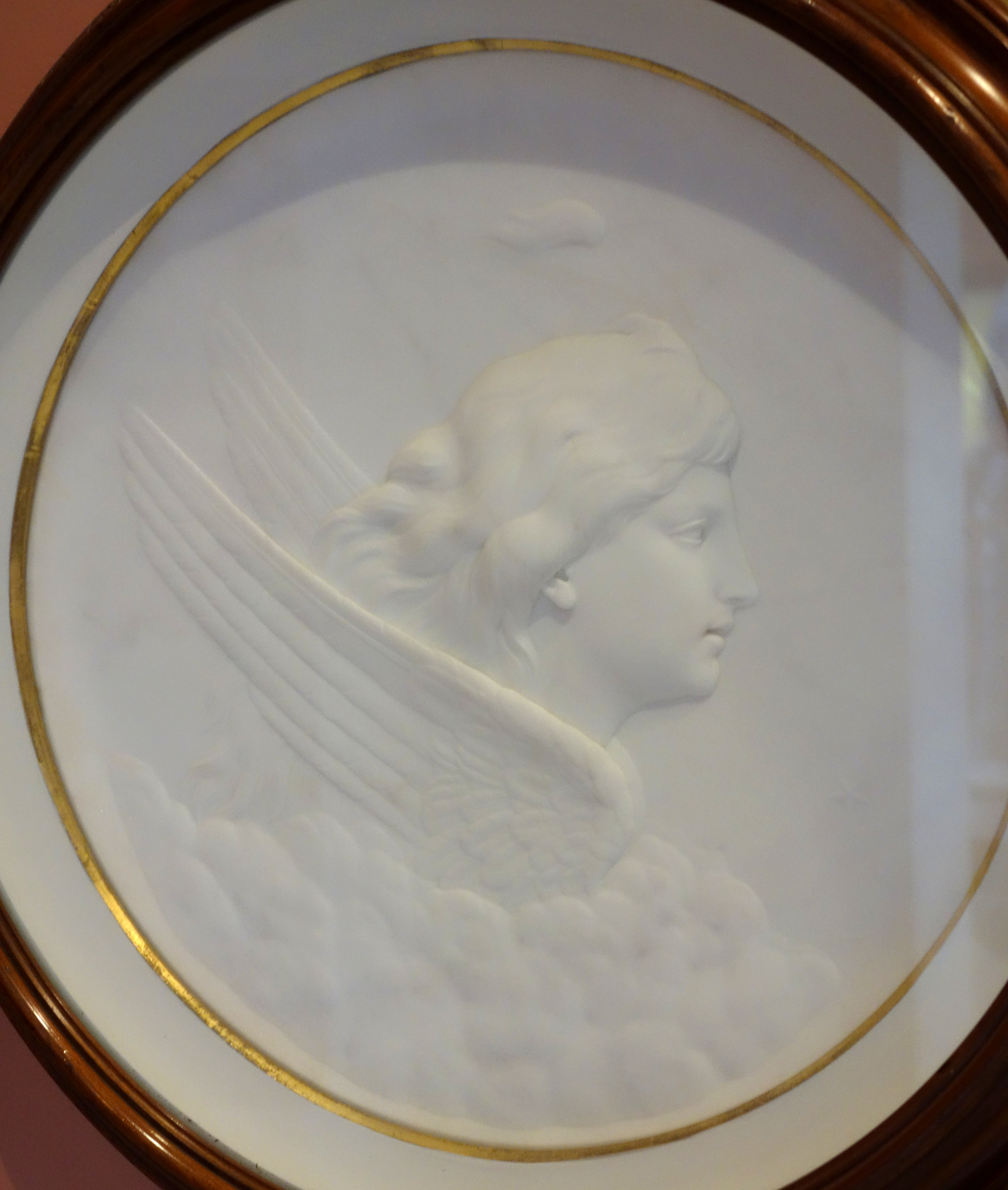
Morning by Erastus Dow Palmer, 1854
