= Van Wart =

Van Wart or van Wart is a surname. Notable people with the surname include:

- Ames Van Wart (1841–1927), American sculptor
- Henry van Wart (1784–1873), American-born British businessman and alderman
- Isaac Van Wart (1762–1828), New York militiaman, one of the three men who captured British Major John André
- Montgomery Van Wart, American professor of public administration, author and researcher

== See also ==
- Freek van der Wart (born 1988), Dutch short track speed skater
- Van Wert (disambiguation)
