= 1865 New York City mayoral election =

- December 5, 1865
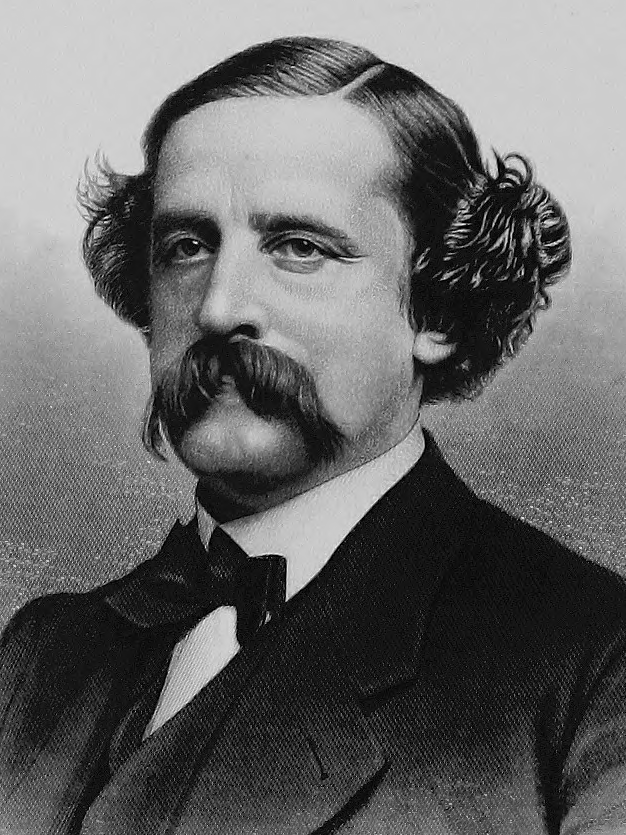

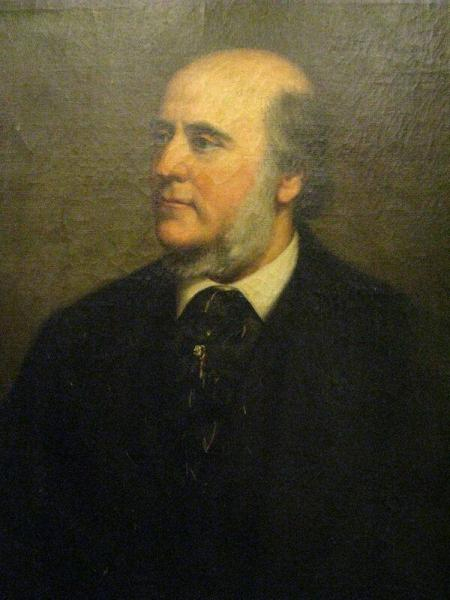

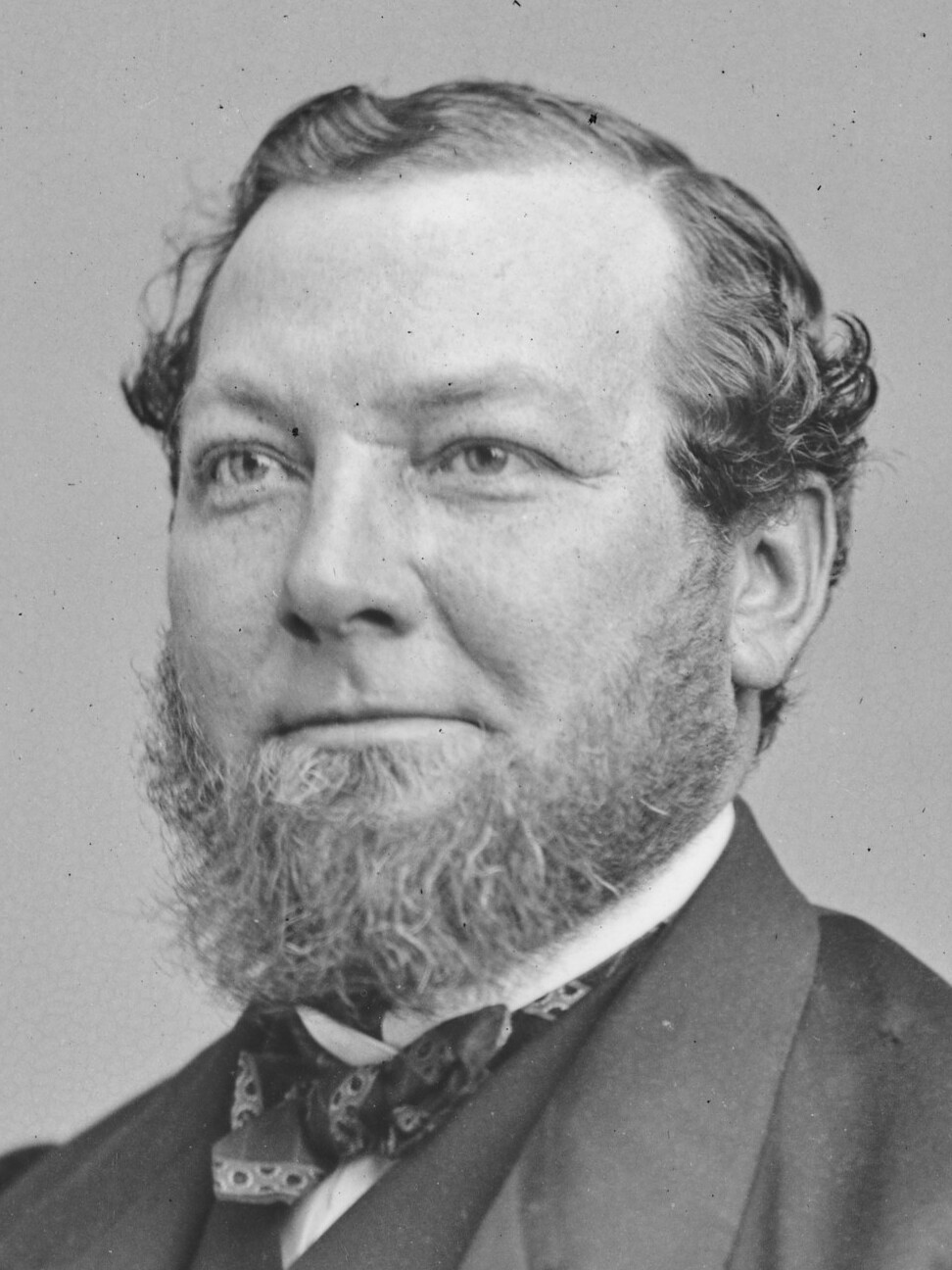
Nominee	John T. Hoffman	Marshall Owen Roberts
Party	Democratic	National Union
Alliance	Tammany Hall
Popular vote	32,820	31,657
Percentage	40.21%	38.78%
Nominee	John Hecker	C. Godfrey Gunther
Party	Independent Democratic	Independent Democratic
Alliance	Mozart Hall	McKeon Democratic
Popular vote	10,390	6,758
Percentage	12.73%	8.28%
Mayor before election
C. Godfrey Gunther
Democratic
Elected mayor
John T. Hoffman
Democratic

The 1865 New York City mayoral election took place on December 5, 1865, to elect the Mayor of New York City.

John T. Hoffman, the Recorder of New York City, beat Republican nominee and businessman Marshall Owen Roberts, as well as two other Democratic candidates, John Hecker and incumbent mayor C. Godfrey Gunther.

== Background ==
After his unsuccessful bid for mayor in 1863, Francis I. A. Boole was once again nominated by Tammany Hall for mayor in 1865. However, after multiple corruption scandals were revealed about him later that year, public pressure became so great that Tammany Hall was forced to withdraw his nomination in favor of John T. Hoffman, the Recorder of New York City.

The Union Party, confident it would win with the extremely splintered Democratic ticket, nominated businessman Marshall Owen Roberts, who easily out-voted Frederick A. Conkling's nomination 81-28 at the convention, with all other candidates receiving a combined 9 votes.

== General election ==
=== Candidates ===
- John T. Hoffman, Recorder of New York City (Tammany Hall Democratic)
- Marshall Owen Roberts. businessman (Union)
- John Hecker (Mozart Hall Democratic)
- C. Godfrey Gunther, incumbent Mayor (McKeon Democratic)

=== Results ===
1865 New York City Mayoral Election
Party	Candidate	Votes	%
Democratic	John T. Hoffman	32,820	40.21%
National Union	Marshall Owen Roberts	31,657	38.78%
Independent Democratic	John Hecker	10,390	12.73%
Independent Democratic	C. Godfrey Gunther (incumbent)	6,758	8.28%
Total votes		81,625	100.00%
