= Henry van Wart =

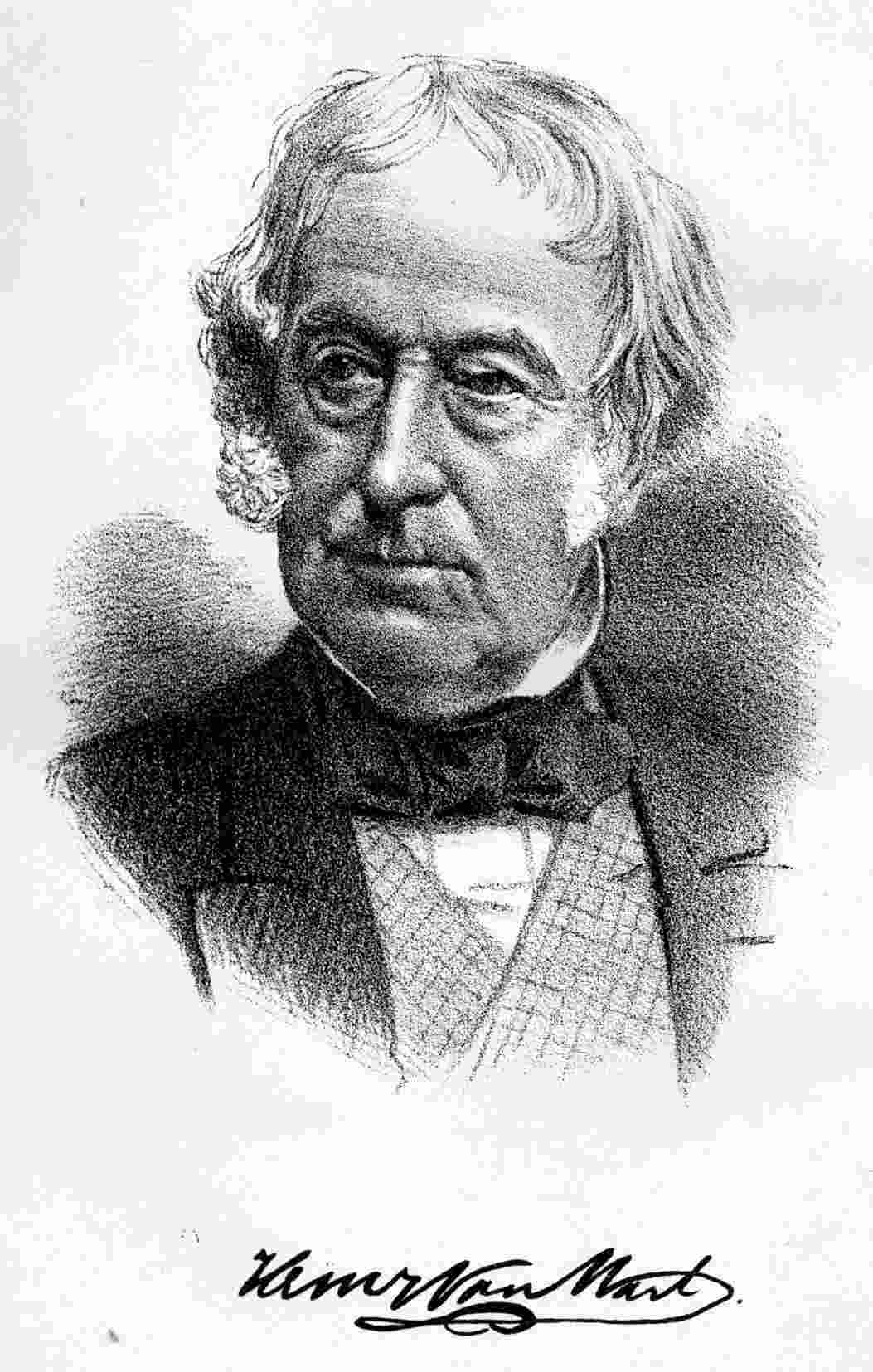
Henry van Wart

Henry van Wart (1783–1873), an American who became British by special act of Parliament, served as one of Birmingham, England's first aldermen, founded and chaired the Birmingham Stock Exchange, and was a director of the Birmingham Banking Company.

He was born on 25 September 1783 in New York and in 1804 was married to Sarah Irving, the youngest sister of his employer, William Irving, of the New York City company Irving & Smith, whose other sibling was author Washington Irving. The marriage was described as a happy one, and they had at least six children: Henry (born Liverpool, 1806–1878), Irving (1808–1896; Founder of the Irving Hardware Company, New York City), William (1812–1868), Matilda (b. 1816), George (1817–1903; a wine merchant) and Washington Irving Van Wart (1819–1844). William later named his first-born Washington Irving van Wart (b. 1836), whose niece in turn was called Rosalinda Irving van Wart (b. 1874).

Henry and Sarah moved to England when he was tasked with opening a Liverpool branch of the firm. After this was abandoned, in 1806, the couple and their new-born first child returned to America.

In 1808, they moved to Birmingham, England, and he set up a profitable business, exporting the city's goods to America. Once his son George joined the business they traded as Henry Van Wart Son & Co.

Washington Irving lived with the van Warts at four of their homes in Birmingham, light-heartedly christening two of these buildings "Castle van Tromp" and writing some of his most successful stories at them. He is also known to have worshipped at St Paul's Church in St Paul's Square, Birmingham.

Van Wart developed a friendship with Louisiana businessman Frederick W. Tilton, who became van Wart's agent in New Orleans. Tilton endowed the library at Tulane University.

Henry van Wart was also great friends with fellow American Samuel Aspinwall Goddard, US Consul to Birmingham. Goddard's uncle was Thomas Aspinwall United States consul to London, 1816–1854. Goddard was a gunmaker, LBSC director, owner of the Surprise railway locomotive of 1840, author and pamphleteer, exhibitor of guns at the Great Exhibition of 1851 and co-patentee with William Church of a breech-loading canon presented to the British parliamentary ordinance committee in 1853. Samuel A. Goddard also named his daughter Emily van Wart Goddard after Henry van Wart.

In 1854, van Wart was instrumental in assisting the formerly enslaved James Watkins to bring his wife from the United States to Birmingham.

When he was 87, his full-length portrait in oil was painted by Henry Turner Munns. It was commissioned by his colleagues at the Birmingham Stock Exchange, where it was hung.

van Wart died at his home in Birmingham on 15 February 1873, aged 89. His wife had predeceased him, in 1848.

The sculptor Ames Van Wart was his grandson.
