= Van Wert =

Van Wert may refer to:

== Places in the United States ==
- Van Wert, Georgia, an unincorporated community
- Van Wert, Iowa, a city
- Van Wert County, Ohio
  - Van Wert, Ohio, a city and the county seat

== Other uses ==
- Isaac Van Wart (1762–1828), also spelled Van Wert, New York militiaman, one of the three men who captured British Major John André
- Van Wert High School, Van Wert, Ohio

== See also ==
- Van Wart, a list of people with the surname
