= James Watkins (abolitionist) =

American author and abolitionist (born ca. 1823)

- Born: Sam Berry; 1823; Baltimore County, Maryland, US
- Died: Unknown
- Occupations: Author and abolitionist

James Watkins (born c. 1823), was an African-American author and abolitionist. After managing to escape from slavery, Watkins travelled to the United Kingdom, where he gave several lectures against American slavery.

== Early life ==
Watkins was born into slavery as Sam Berry about 1823 (Note: The memoir of 1852 says "about 1821", the memoir of 1860 "about 1823".) on "Mr. Abraham Ensor's plantation, about six miles from Cuckerville, (Note: Mary Ellen Snodgrass, The Underground Railroad, calls this place Cockeysville.) Baltimore Co., Maryland." His mother was Milcah Berry. His father, Amos Salisbury, was the overseer of the plantation. Watkins describes him as a "cruel and severe disciplinarian" who never recognized Watkins as his son. Salisbury died about 1836. In the first edition of his slave narrative, Watkins states, "I well remember how glad I felt at having got rid of such a cruel overseer", but in the second edition that sentence about his feelings at the death of his father is left out.

== Conversion and escape ==
After the death of his enslaver he was separated from some of his siblings who were sold away, while he and his mother fell into the hands of Luke Ensor, Abraham Ensor's son. In 1841, he tried to run away for the first time, but was caught and severely punished. For three months, his enslaver made him wear an iron collar with bells attached to it. Some time after his failed escape, he stole away at night to attend a Methodist camp meeting. Here, he experienced his conversion and spent many hours in intense prayer, which resulted in his returning late to the plantation. Ensor, having explicitly forbidden his participation, tied him up to whip him, but was unable to strike a single blow when Watkins told him that Jesus would hold him responsible for every blow. The religious experience having increased his longing for freedom, he made a second attempt at escaping in May 1844, succeeding with the help of several Quakers.

== Abolitionist and author ==
To avoid detection by Luke Ensor, he changed his name to James Watkins. He settled in Hartford, Connecticut where he married Mary Eliza and had children. The Fugitive Slave Act of 1850 convinced him that he was not safe in the United States. Supported by his wife, Watkins sailed to Great Britain, where he began giving abolitionist lectures. While in Britain, Watkins received a letter from his wife who wrote that:

Your free papers—shame on the country which we ought to claim our own—that men and women must be bought like cattle, horses, hogs, and sheep; but it is so,--your free papers are come, and you can come home without fear of being arrested by tyrants as a runaway slave. When will this cruelty and oppression cease? I fear not before many have had to suffer on account of cruel powers and laws. But the Judge of all the earth will surely do right. Whatever you think your duty to do—my dear—I feel to say to you—do; however, I wish much to see you; but do all you can for your oppressed brethren, as I see by the papers, you sent me you are.

Separated from her husband by thousands of miles, she was an activist in her own right and encouraged her husband to do his duty for the abolitionist cause while she raised their children and looked after their home.

Watkins wrote two versions of his slave narrative, one published in 1852 – Narrative of the Life of James Watkins - the second one in 1860, entitled Struggles for Freedom. He also published a poetry book in Manchester in 1859. Watkins was a strong supporter of the free produce movement, and regularly called on the British public in his lectures to avoid purchasing or consuming goods from the U.S. which were made with enslaved labor. During his lectures, Watkins frequently showed instruments of torture, recounted stories of failed escape attempts, and occasionally sang songs at the close of such lectures. He spoke in over 1,000 locations around Britain and Ireland between 1852 and 1862 (see a map of his speaking locations in the references).

In October 1853, he lectured in Wolverhampton where the newspaper reported noted:

He commenced by calling particular attention to America, which, he said, had been untruthfully denominated the land of freedom, while, at the same time, three millions and a half of human beings were kept in a state of degradation.

In Sheffield in July 1854, Watkins delivered another speech that was captured at great length by a newspaper reporter. Watkins declared:

The Declaration of Independence affirmed that all men are created free and equal. But in defiance of this solemn declaration, there are two millions and a half of slaves on its soil. Having been for 20 years a slave, he knew something of their condition. He was not permitted to receive any education, not even to attend a Sunday school – none dared tell him about Christ. A slave was only considered a thing, like a horse, and was bought and sold in the market like cattle…The blacks were not the only sufferers, the whites were partners therein. Infants are sold by weight – two guineas for every pound. Infants are sold from the breast. They would sell an angel if they could. His own sister had been sold, and that too for the white man’s lust. The horrors of slavery could not be exaggerated – the picture was so black, that it was impossible to over colour…He remembered in youth walking in the tobacco fields, and watching in the tobacco fields, and watching the big sun in its glorious freedom, rising and setting and spanning the heavens, and as he gazed he was moved by a passionate longing to be free, and asked, How long shall I be a slave? But echo returned no response but one of despair, “For life!” He thought it very hard to be thus at the mercy of a man like himself, and not to be able so much as to call even an inch of his skin on his own…If you could hear the groans of the slaves, and witness for a moment their sufferings, you would never again touch Savannah rice – you would feel you were eating the blood and bones of the negroes.

His activist wife, Mary Eliza, followed him to Britain after some time, but became ill and returned to Connecticut on medical advice.

Little is known about his later life and death. Snodgrass gives his birth and death dates as "ca. 1821 – ?" and ending with the publication of his 1860 memoir. Other sources suggest he may have returned to live in the US on the SS Nevada in 1869, and was listed in the 1880 census for Baltimore, Maryland aged 51.
