= Indian Vase =

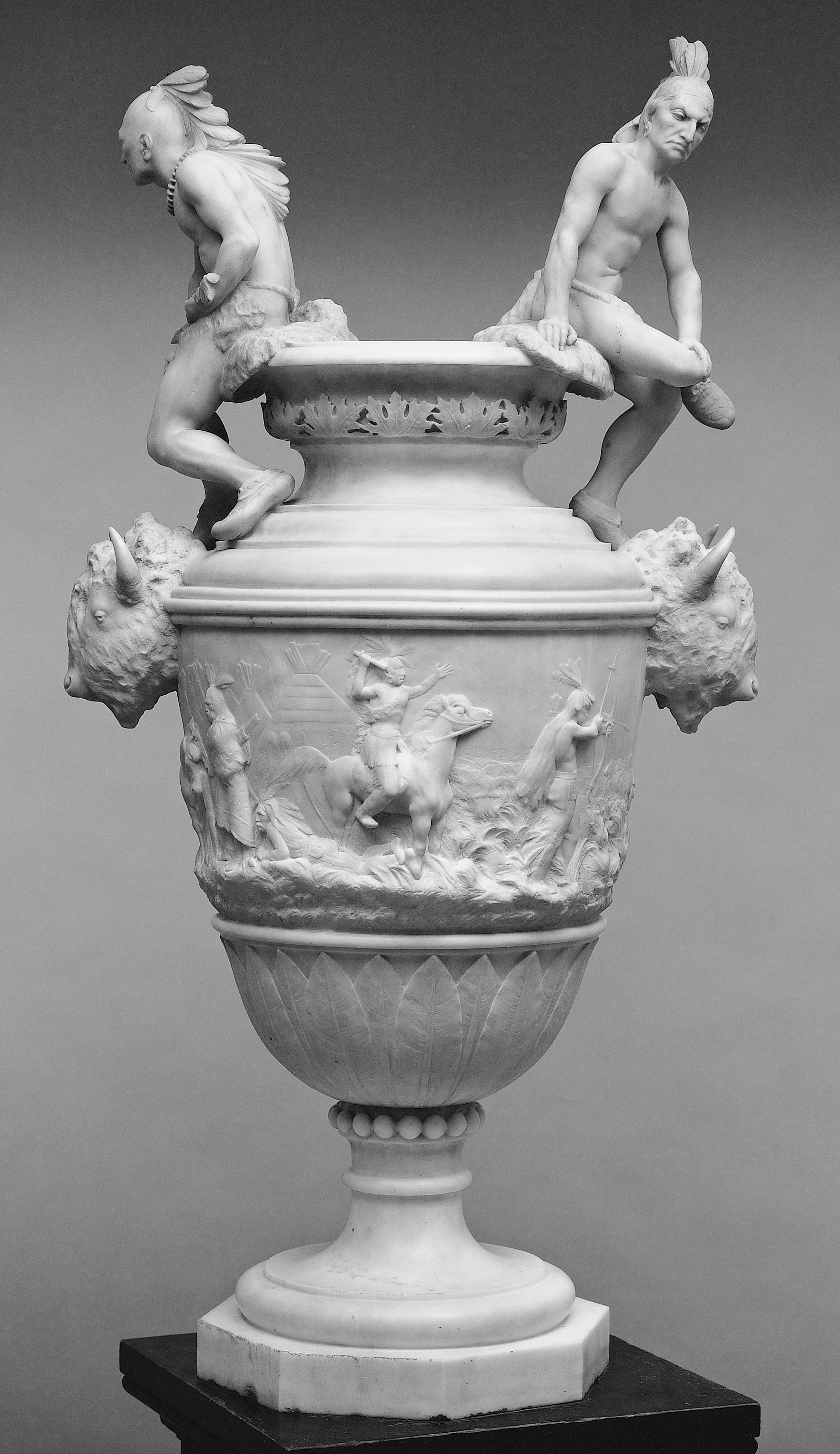
- Year: 1876
- Identifiers: The Met object ID: 13041

The Indian Vase, is a large vase carved in marble in 1876 by Ames Van Wart (American, 1841–1927). It measures 46 1/2 x 24 x 16 in. (118.1 x 61 x 40.6 cm), and is now in the Metropolitan Museum of Art, New York, part of the Gift of Estate of Marshall O. Roberts, 1897 (97.10). On view in gallery 760.

From the Met's website: "Its motifs explicitly acknowledge the displacement of Indigenous Americans by Euro-American settlement in the West".

== Design ==
The iconography of Indian Vase consists of friezes of Native Americans from the period prior to the pacification of Native Americans and their assignments to reservations and dependency on the Federal government.

The figures are clearly Indians of the Plains Indians rendered utilizing classicizing approaches and in marble, thus indicating the classicism and neoclassicism (that in this work shades into Romanticism) that Van Wart was exposed to in his extensive travels throughout Europe. Van Wart uses a classical jug, an Amphora for his scenes and sculpts his figures in idealized poses evoking classical prototypes such as the Hellenistic Boy with Thorn and the historicizing friezes of the Roman imperial period as those upon Trajan's Column.

The work is overtly sentimental about the disappeared lives of 'free' indians prior to the transformation of the New World into lands populated by Europeans. This exoticism European artists freely applied to representation of the other, particularly during Romanticism.

Along with being exotic and romantic, Van Wart's focus on indians fit neatly with the depictions of indians in popular dime novels and the Wild West Shows that were extraordinarily popular in the US during the height of Native American pacification.

These two popular trends coexist in Van Wart's amphora. The wealthy New Yorker and europhile Van Wart certainly possessed limited direct knowledge of Native American customs. It is certainly the case that his subject matter was chosen for its appeal to popular tastes. The complexity of the materials and the work's decorative complexity speaks to Van Wart's confidence that the object would sell and it was exhibited prominently in NYC.

The amphora also embodies the Enlightenment notion of the noble savage living in a pre-industrial and increasingly disappearing world.

The representation is an aggregation of popular perceptions of Native Americans in stereotypical pursuits, collaring bison, using bows and arrows in hunts, carrying infants in papooses framed by teepees in low relief. In the intermediate section between the friezes on the base and the free standing figures are hierarchically scaled heads of bison that suggest hunting trophies.

The following text from an undated publication denoted as "Art Journal" illuminates the contemporaneous view of the art work and the artists' practice upon exhibiting the amphora that this is

"the story of the chase, from the time that the red-man leaves his tent accoutred for hunting the buffalo, to the moment of his triumphal return bearing the tokens of his successful encounter".

In an embodiment of the self-directed institutional critique the Metropolitan Museum of Art is undertaking, the web page describing the work is linked to an auxiliary page offering native American perspectives on objects in the museum's permanent collection and this review criticizes the Indian Vase as a 'misunderstanding' of native American culture.

== See also ==
- Amphora
- Cultural assimilation of Native Americans
