= Ames Van Wart =

American sculptor

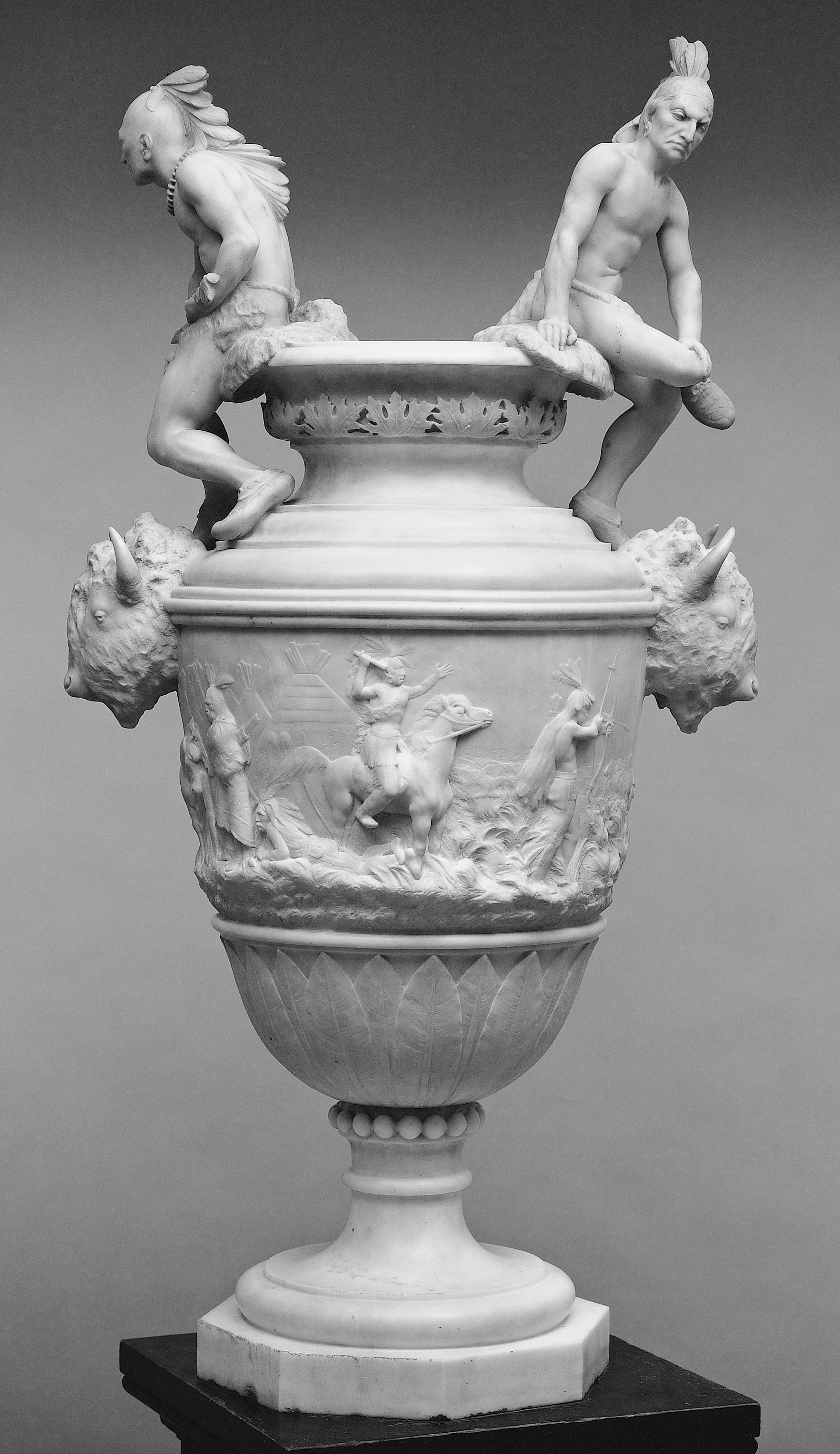
Van Wart's Indian Vase, 1876

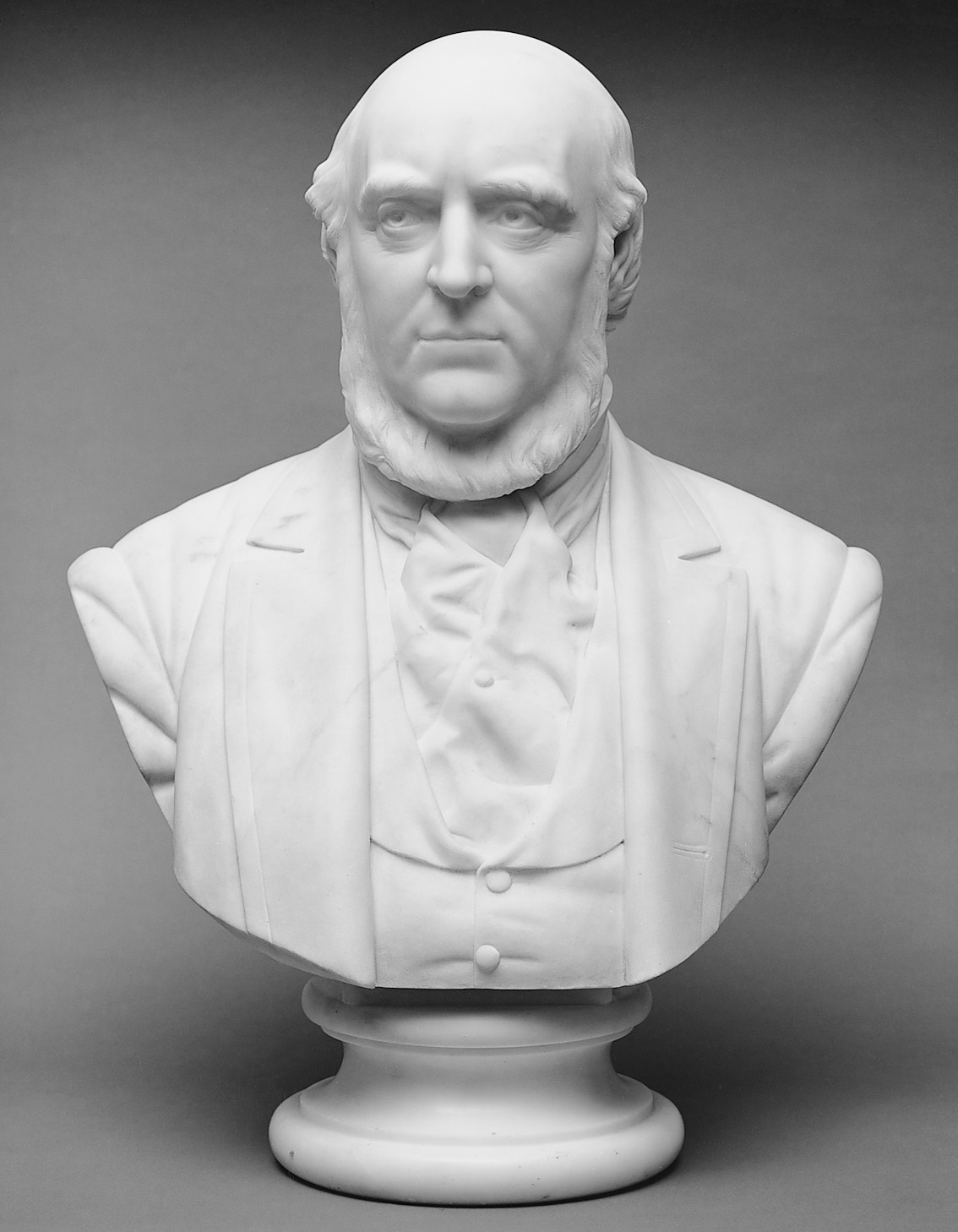
Van Wart's Bust of Marshall O. Roberts, 1884

Ames Van Wart (January 20, 1841 – February 11, 1927) was an American sculptor who lived in Europe.

== Early life ==
Van Wart was born on January 20, 1841, in New York City to a wealthy and prominent family. He was a son of Irving van Wart (1808–1896) and, his second wife, Sarah Craig (née Ames) van Wart. His twin brother was Irving Van Wart Jr. and the family had a residence in New York City and a country home in Craigville in Orange County, New York, which had been named after their great-grandfather Hector Craig.

He was a grandson of Sarah (née Irving) van Wart (a sister of Washington Irving) and Henry van Wart, an American who became British by special act of Parliament and founded the Birmingham Stock Exchange (Irving wrote Rip Van Winkle in Birmingham). As children, Van Wart and his twin brother visited their great-uncle at Sunnyside his country home in Irvington, celebrated his 72nd birthday, and went with him to the opera in New York. His grandfather was a grand-nephew of Revolutionary War soldier Isaac Van Wart, who was one of three men who captured British Major John André. His maternal grandparents were Mary (née Craig) Ames and Barrett Ames, a wealthy cotton merchant, and his uncle was Hector Ames, one of Washington Irving's attachés' at Madrid. His grandmother's father was U.S. Representative Hector Craig, and her sister, Sarah Agnes Craig, married William F. Havemeyer, three-time mayor of New York City.

In 1859, the Van Wart family moved to Paris.

== Career ==
While in Paris, he likely met sculptor Richard Saltonstall Greenough (younger brother of Horatio Greenough), who encouraged Van Wart to pursue the study of sculpture in Italy, so the Van Wart family spent the winter of 1861 to 1862 in Florence, where he studied under Hiram Powers, the prominent American sculptor. He made busts of his grandfather, Henry van Wart (1864), Horace Greeley, his grand-uncle Washington Irving, and Peter Cooper.

He returned to New York in the 1860s, married, and became a member of the Century Association. In 1872, Van Wart and his wife traveled extensively around Europe with her father-in-law (an avid art collector), spending time at Nice, in the south of France and London, where they lived (and became friends with Lord Frederick Leighton). They also spent time in Rome with his friend William Wetmore Story. He exhibited at the National Academy of Design in 1872 and at the Paris Salon from 1904 to 1905.

Today, his work can be found in the Metropolitan Museum of Art in New York. Other known works by Van Wart include a Bust of a Quadroon Girl, which was exhibited in Boston and New York in 1869. He posthumously created a bust of his father-in-law, which today is also in the Metropolitan Museum.

In 1923, he published his autobiography in Paris, titled Reminiscences and Nonsense.

== Personal life ==
On April 23, 1869, Van Wart was married to heiress Caroline Marshall "Carrie" Roberts (1849–1893). She was a daughter of Marshall Owen Roberts and, his second wife, Caroline Danforth (née Smith) Roberts. Carrie's aunt, Mary Boardman Smith, was the wife of abolitionist William Weston Patton (fifth president of Howard University). After their marriage, they lived at the Roberts residence, 107 Fifth Avenue at the southeast corner of 18th Street. Together, they were the parents of:

- Evelyn Mary Frances Van Wart (1870–1910), who died unmarried in Bordighera, Italy.

His wife died at 2 South Street, their home in Park Lane, London on June 24, 1893. She was buried at Kensal Green Cemetery in London.

Van Wart remarried and lived at 33 Boulevard Maillot, Neuilly-sur-Seine, an exclusive residential suburb of Paris. He died in Paris on February 11, 1927.
