= Napoleon I at Fontainebleau on March 31, 1814 =

Painting by Paul Delaroche

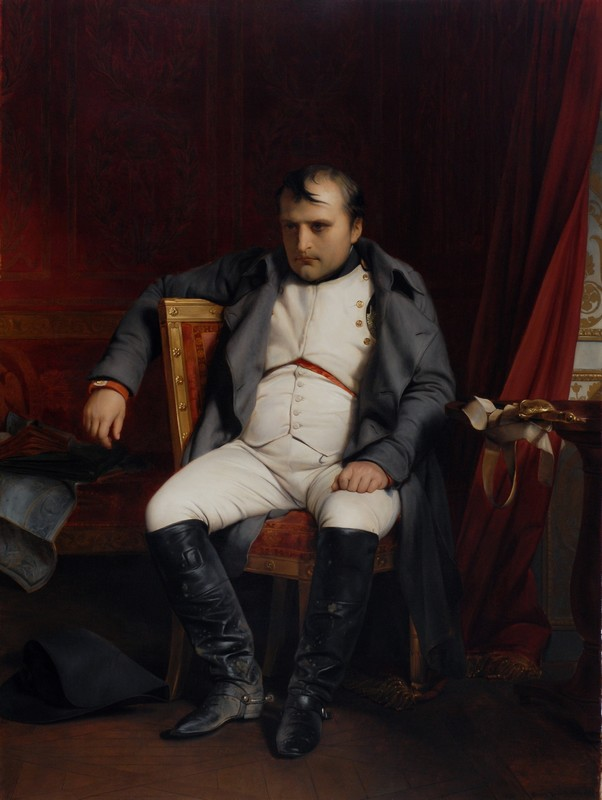
- Artist: Paul Delaroche
- Year: 1840
- Medium: Oil on canvas
- Dimensions: 180.5 cm × 137.5 cm (71.1 in × 54.1 in)
- Location: Museum der bildenden Künste; Leipzig

Napoleon I at Fontainebleau on March 31, 1814 (also known as Napoleon Abdicating at Fontainebleau or Napoleon at Fontainebleau) is an oil on canvas painting by the French painter Paul Delaroche, created in 1840. Not coincidentally, the work was made in the same year that the Retour des cendres (return of the ashes), or the return of Napoleon's mortal remains from the island of Saint Helena took place. The original of the painting is held at the Army Museum, in Paris, while there are copies at the Museum der bildenden Künste, in Leipzig and in the British Royal Collection, on display at Osborne House.

== History and description ==
The painting documents a historical event, when Napoleon, after the fall of Paris, on March 31, 1814, was forced to abdicate on April 4, to his young son, Napoleon II, and finally, and without conditions, on April 6. He would be sent into exile to the Italian island of Elba, of which he would be made a sort of honorary king.

The painting depicts Napoleon in a room of the Palace of Fontainebleau. He appears with a thoughtful expression, while he sits informally in a chair. He has the appearance of someone who has just returned from combat, while he also wears his uniform of colonel of the horse grenadiers of the Imperial Guard, with his grey frock coat. The Emperor wears dirty boots and his hat lies on the ground. The character contrasts with the apparent luxury of the decor.

The work has been described as being somewhere in between the psychological portrait and the history painting. It illustrates a scene of isolation of the Emperor described by Louis Antoine Fauvelet de Bourrienne at his Mémoires.

The subject had already been addressed by Delaroche's father-in-law, Horace Vernet, in his painting Les Adieux de Fontainebleau (1825).

== Provenance ==
The painting was acquired by the German art collector and merchant Adolf Heinrich Schletter from the artist himself. He would become the patron of the Museum der bildenden Künste, in Leipzig, due to his gift of French artworks, in 1858.
