= Seymour Joseph Guy =

American painter

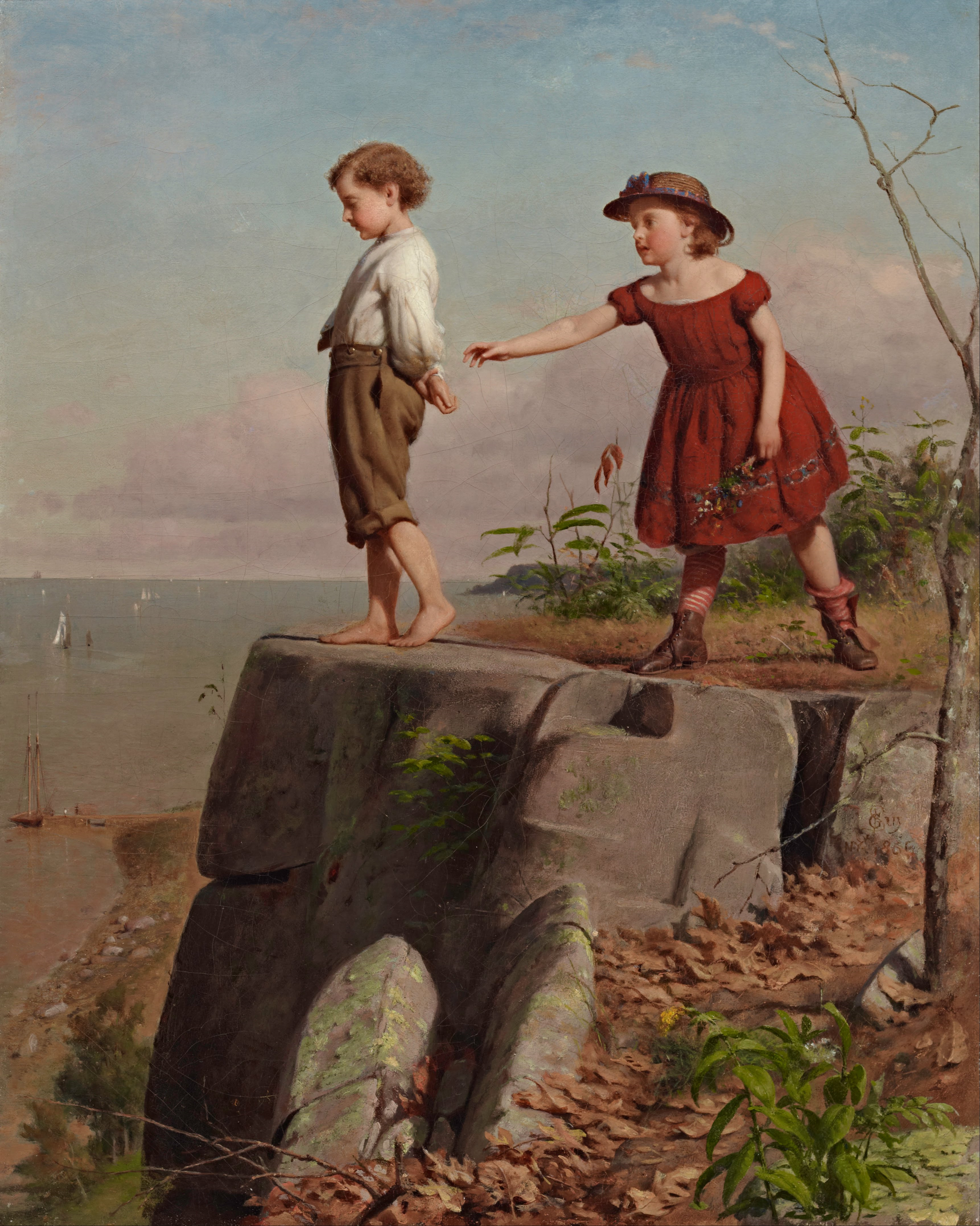
Unconscious of Danger

Seymour Joseph Guy (1824–1910), was an American romance and portrait painter.

== Biography ==
He was born and trained in London but moved to New York City, where he is known for genre works. He trained for four years with the portrait painter Ambrosini Jerôme and married the daughter of an engraver, Anna Maria Barber, before his move to New York in 1854. He was a member of the Sketch club and became friends with John George Brown, and they both began to paint genre works of children, probably inspired by their own, as Guy eventually had nine.

He was a founder of the American Watercolor Society and a member of the National Academy of Design, the Artists' Fund Society, the Artists' Mutual Aid Society, and the Century Association. He died at his home in New York on December 10, 1910.

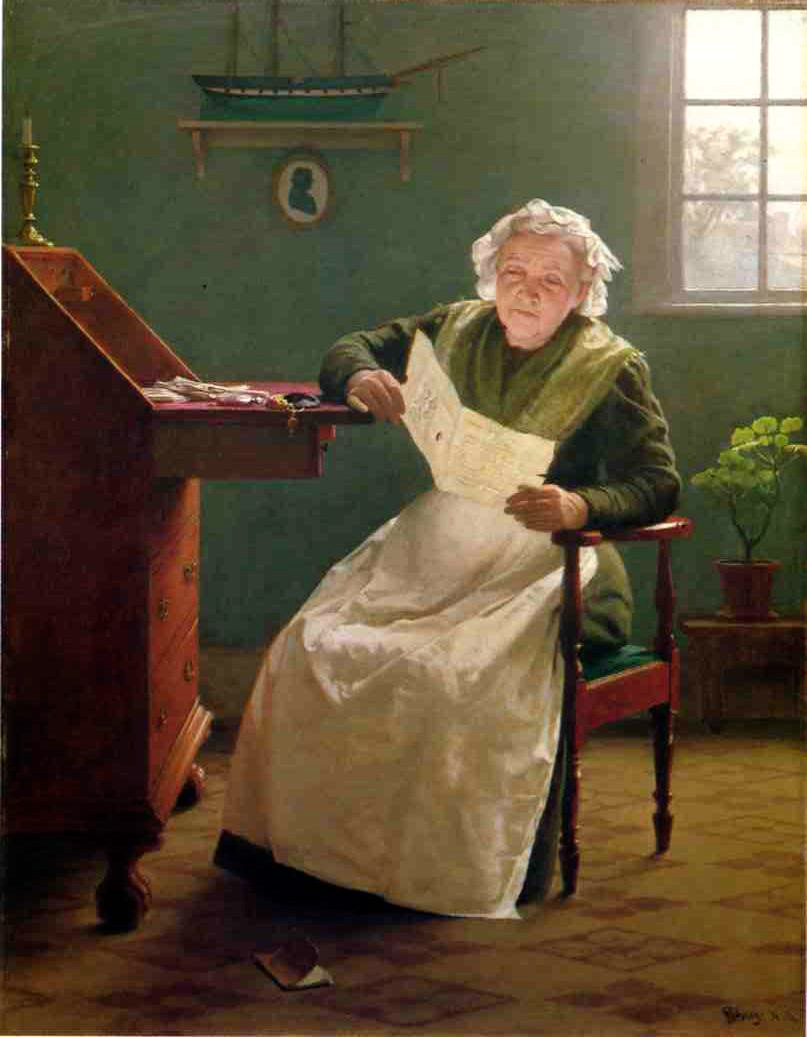
Dear Polly

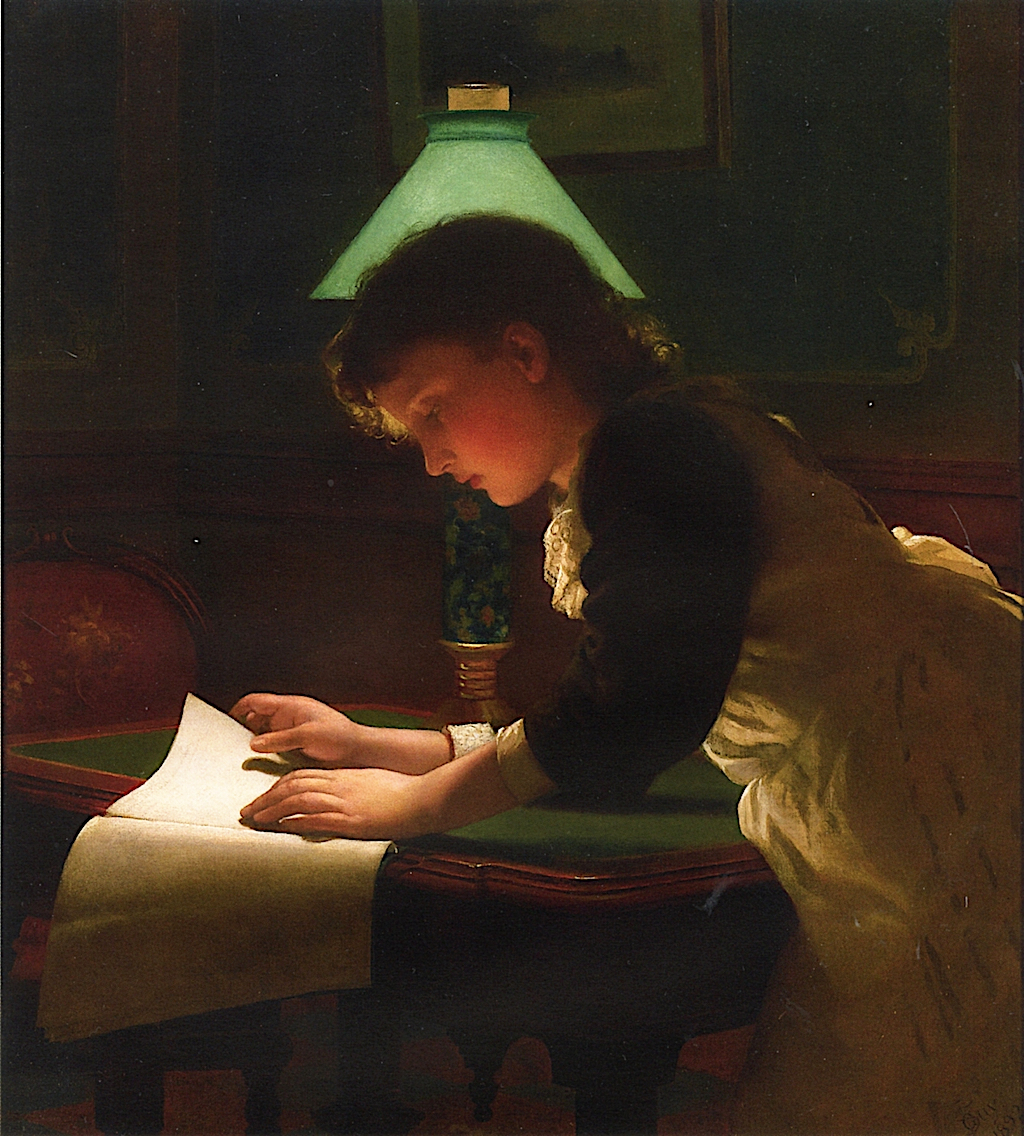
The new story (1892)

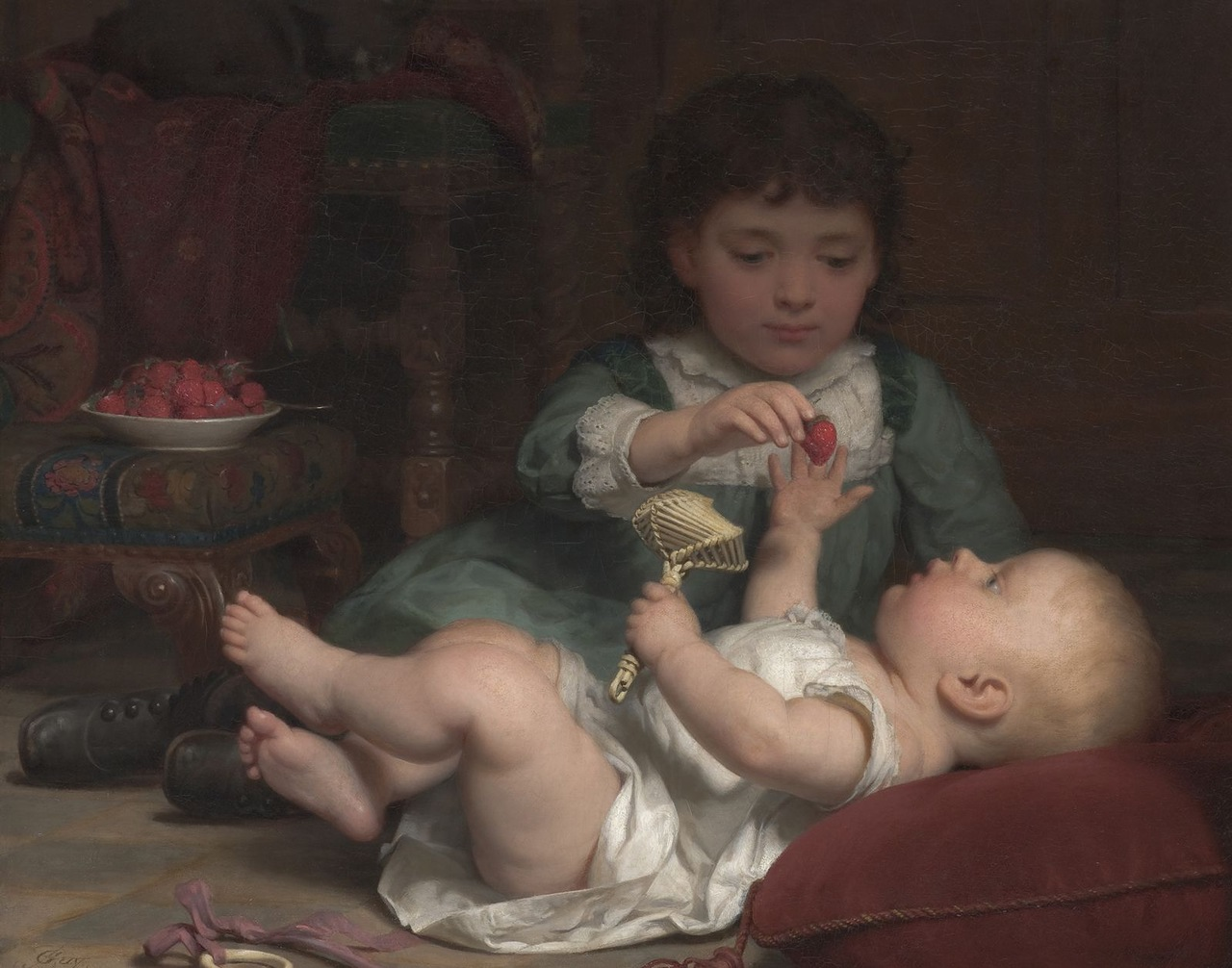
Temptation (1884)

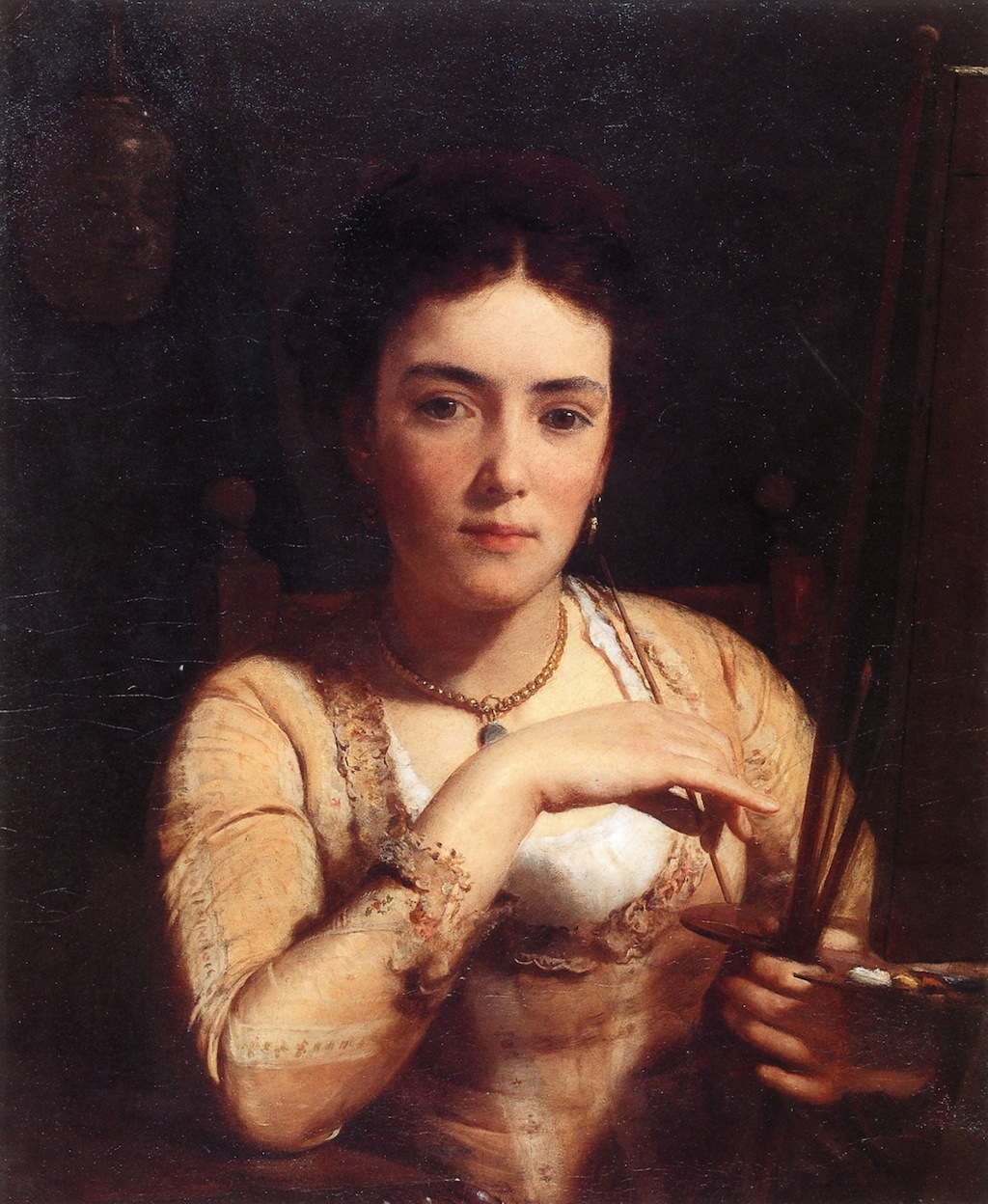
Now I'm ready for your portrait

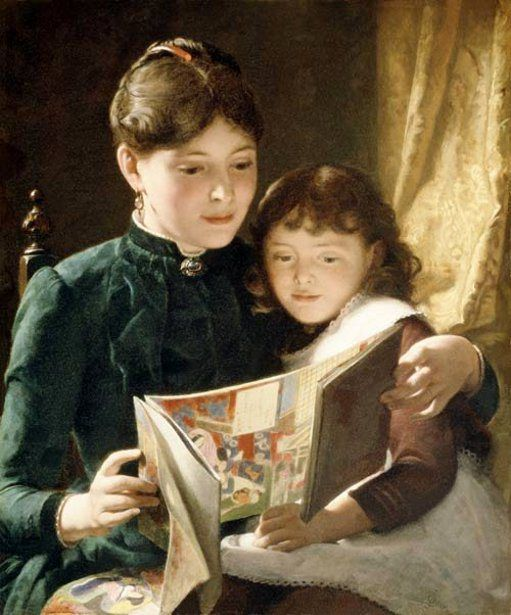
Knowledge is Power
