= Birmingham Stock Exchange =

Former stock exchange in Birmingham, England

Coordinates: 52°28′54″N 1°54′15″W

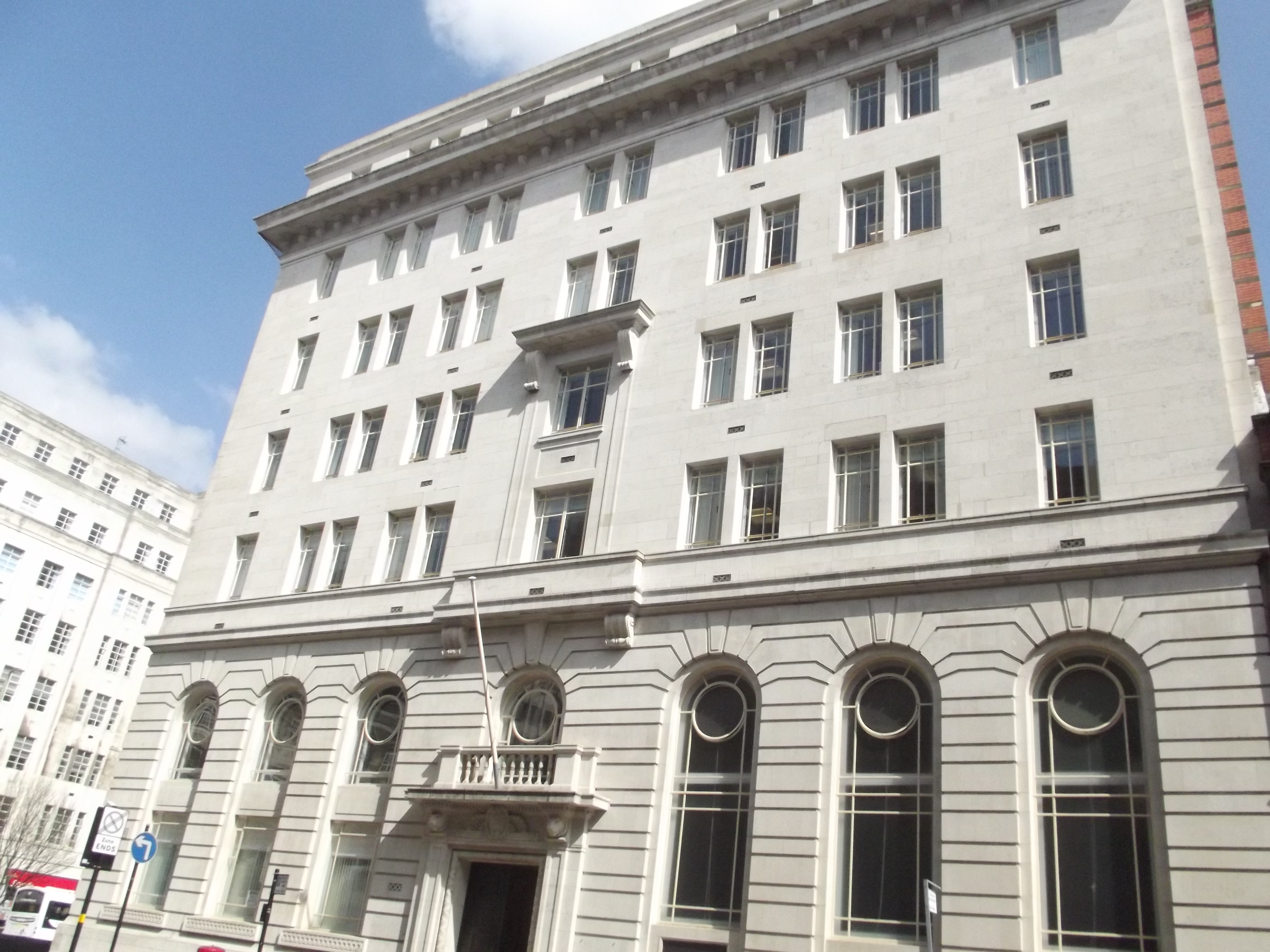
The old Stock Exchange building on Margaret Street

The Birmingham Stock Exchange originally opened in 1845. The imposing offices on the corner of Great Charles Street and Margaret Street, now a Grade II listed building, were home to the city's stock exchange from 1928 onwards, and were the centre of Birmingham stockbroking until their closure in 1986 after the Big Bang. Its function was to raise capital through joint stock issues for manufacturers, mineral extractors and railway companies.

== Stock Exchange Association ==
The Birmingham Stock Exchange Association was formed in 1845, though an association of share brokers was apparently in existence before that date.

It first met in the old Royal Hotel, then, after being held in various hired rooms in Waterloo Passage from c. 1874, it moved in c. 1894 to Newhall Street, where the building in existence in 1955 was opened in 1928.

== Other exchanges in Birmingham ==
The Birmingham Stock Exchange was one of several exchanges that were set up in 19th century Birmingham.

The Corn Market in the Bull Ring was replaced in 1847 by the Corn Exchange in Carrs Lane.

The Birmingham Exchange, a commodity exchange dealing mainly in iron and steel, was founded in 1861. Its building in Stephenson Place, which also served as a meeting place for various purposes, was opened in 1865

The Grocery Exchange was founded in 1866 and used the Corn Exchange buildings. In 1908 it moved to its own premises in Newhall Street and closed in 1934.

The Building Trades Exchange in Cannon Street was founded in 1905.
