= Marshall (name) =

- Pronunciation: /ˈmɑːrʃəl/
- Language: English

Origin
- Language: Middle English
- Origin: Anglo-Norman, Old French, Medieval Latin: mariscalcus
- Derivation: *marh + *skalk (West Germanic languages)
- Meaning: 'horse servant'

Marshall is an occupational surname stemming from the Middle English mareshal. This originally denoted a groom or farrier, but later came to be a title for various types of official. It derives from a Germanic compound meaning "horse servant" (cf. mare and shalk).

== Surname ==
- Ahmani Marshall (born 2002), American football player
- Alan Marshall (disambiguation), multiple people
- Alan John (Jock) Marshall (1911–1967), Australian author, academic and ornithologist
- Albert Marshall (author) (born 1947), Maltese author and poet
- Alex Marshall (disambiguation), multiple people
- Alexander Marshall (disambiguation), multiple people
- Alexis Marshall (born 1980), American vocalist in the band Daughters
- Alfred Marshall (1842–1924), English economist
- Arthur Marshall (disambiguation), multiple people
- Barry Marshall (born 1951), Australian physician and Nobel Prize winner known for stomach-ulcer research
- Benjamin Marshall (disambiguation), multiple people, including Ben Marshall
- Benji Marshall (born 1985), New Zealand rugby league player
- Bob Marshall (disambiguation), multiple people
- Boyd Marshall (1884–1950), American actor
- Brandon Marshall (born 1984), American football player
- Carl Marshall, Jamaican politician
- Cecilia Suyat Marshall (1928–2022), American civil rights activist and historian
- Chad Marshall, known as Rowdy Rebel (born 1991), American rapper
- Charles Henry Tilson Marshall (1841–1927), British Army Officer
- Cherry Marshall (1923–2006), British fashion model and agent
- Cuddles Marshall (1925–2007), American baseball players
- Danny Marshall (born 1952), American politician and motor sports driver/team operator
- David Marshall (disambiguation), multiple people
- Debra Marshall (born 1960), American wrestling manager
- Dixie Marshall (born 1963), Australian newsreader
- Donald Albert Marshall (born 1932), Canadian politician
- Donny Marshall (born 1972), NBA basketball player
- Donyell Marshall (born 1973), NBA basketball player
- E. G. Marshall (1914–1998), American actor
- Elizabeth Marshall (politician) (born 1951), Canadian politician
- Elizabeth Marshall (cook) (born 1738), English chef and food writer
- Elizabeth Marshall (pharmacist) (1768–1836), American businesswoman and pharmacist
- E. Pierce Marshall (1939–2006), American businessman and son of J. Howard Marshall
- Erin Marshall (born 1987), English wrestler
- Ethel Marshall (1924–2013), American badminton player
- Francis Marshall (disambiguation), multiple people
- Frank Marshall (disambiguation), multiple people
- Gabbie Marshall (born 2000), American basketball player
- Garry Marshall (1934–2016), American actor/director/writer/producer
- Gavin Marshall (born 1960), Australian politician
- Geoffrey Marshall (disambiguation), multiple people
- George Marshall (conservationist) (1904–2000), American economist
- George C. Marshall (1880–1959), U.S. general, Secretary of State and Nobel Laureate, known for the Marshall Plan
- Grant Marshall (born 1973), Canadian ice hockey player
- Grant Marshall, known as Daddy G (born 1959), British member of the band Massive Attack
- Gregg Marshall (born 1963), American basketball coach
- Guy Anstruther Knox Marshall (1871–1959), Indian-born British entomologist
- Hannah Marshall (actress) (born 1984), New Zealand actress
- Hannah Marshall (visual artist) (born 1982), British fashion designer
- Helen Marshall (disambiguation), multiple people
- Helen M. Marshall (1929–2017), American politician
- Howard Marshall (disambiguation), multiple people
- Humphrey Marshall (disambiguation), multiple people
- Humphry Marshall (1722–1801), American botanist
- Hunter Marshall III (1917–1942), U.S. Navy officer and Silver Star recipient
- Ian Marshall (English footballer) (born 1966), English footballer
- Ian Marshall (soccer coach) (1942–2003), New Zealand national football team coach
- Iman Marshall (born 1997), American football player
- Ingram Marshall (1942–2022), American composer
- Isaiah Marshall (born 2005), American football player
- Jack Marshall (disambiguation), multiple people
- Jalin Marshall (born 1995), American football player
- James Marshall (disambiguation), multiple people
- Jim Marshall (disambiguation), multiple people
- John Marshall (disambiguation), multiple people
- John Marshall (1755–1835), 4th Chief Justice of the United States
- Johnnie Marshall (born 1961), American blues guitarist, songwriter, and singer
- Jonathan Marshall (disambiguation), multiple people
- Joy Marshall (1867–1903), New Zealand clergyman
- Justin Marshall (born 1973), New Zealand rugby union player
- Justin Marshall (neuroscientist) (born 1962), British-born Australian neuroscientist
- Kamau M. Marshall, American political advisor and strategist
- Kelly Fyffe-Marshall, Canadian filmmaker
- Kris Marshall (born 1973), British actor
- Kristal Marshall (born 1983), American model and WWE Diva
- Lenore Marshall (1899–1971), American poet, novelist, and activist
- Leonard Marshall (born 1961), American football player
- Lester Marshall (1902–1956), English footballer
- Lewis Marshall (born 1988), New Zealand rugby union player
- Liselotte Marshall (1924–2017), German-born Jewish novelist
- Lois Marshall (1924–1997), Canadian soprano
- Louis Marshall (1856–1929), American lawyer
- Lyndsey Marshal (born 1978), British actress
- Mac Marshall (born 1996), American baseball player
- Margot Marshall (1918–2010), British woman soldier
- Malcolm Marshall (1958–1999), West Indian cricketer
- Maria Marshall (born 1966), British artist
- Marian Sutton Marshall (1846–1901), English Typist and trade unionist
- Mary A. R. Marshall (1921–1992), Virginia politician
- Mary Emma Griffith Marshall (1888–1925), American editor and librarian
- Mary Paley Marshall (1850–1944), British economist
- Maurice Marshall, New Zealand athlete
- Max Marshall (baseball) (1913–1993), American baseball player
- Sir Michael Marshall (1930–2006), British politician
- Mona Marshall (born 1947), American voice actress
- Naji Marshall (born 1998), American basketball player
- Nate Marshall (born 2007), American football player
- Nelly Nichol Marshall (1845–1898), American author
- P. J. Marshall (1933–2025), British historian
- Patricia Marshall (1924–2018), American actress
- Paule Marshall (1929–2019), American writer
- Penelope Marshall (born 1989), New Zealand swimmer
- Penny Marshall (1943–2018), American actress, producer and director
- Peter Marshall (disambiguation), multiple people
- Philippa Marshall (1920–2005), British Royal Air Force officer
- Quavious Marshall (born 1991), American rapper professionally known as Quavo
- Rayah Marshall (born 2003), American basketball player
- Robert Marshall (disambiguation), multiple people
- Roger Marshall (disambiguation), multiple people
- Russell Marshall (1936–2025), New Zealand politician and diplomat
- Scott Marshall (footballer) (born 1973), Scottish footballer
- Shaun Marshall (born 1978), English football goalkeeper
- Shona Marshall, Scottish sport shooter
- Stephen Marshall (disambiguation), multiple people
- J. Stewart Marshall (1911–1992), Canadian physicist and meteorologist
- S. L. A. Marshall (1900–1977), aka "Slam" Marshall, American historian
- Terrace Marshall Jr. (born 2000), American football player
- Thomas Marshall (disambiguation), multiple people
- Timothy P. Marshall (born 1956), American civil engineer and meteorologist
- Thurgood Marshall (1908–1993), Associate Justice of the U.S. Supreme Court
- Tonea Marshall (born 1998), American hurdler
- Tony Marshall (disambiguation), multiple people
- Trey Marshall (born 1996), American football player
- Trezmen Marshall, American college football player
- Vanessa Marshall (born 1969), American voice actress
- Walter Marshall (disambiguation), multiple people
- Whit Marshall (born 1973), American football player
- Winton W. Marshall (1919–2015), United States Air Force general
- William Marshall (disambiguation), multiple people
- Zack Marshall (born 2005), American football player

== Given name ==
- Marshall Allen (born 1924), American jazz saxophonist
- Marshall Allen (journalist) (1972–2024), American journalist
- Marshall Allman (born 1984), American actor
- Marshall Van Alstyne (born 1962), American information economist
- Marshall Altman, American producer and songwriter
- Robert Marshall Anderson (1933–2011), Episcopal Bishop of Minnesota
- William Marshall Anderson (1807–1881), American scholar, explorer and politician
- Marshall Applewhite (1931–1997), American cult leader
- Marshall Archer, American politician
- Marshall Arisman (1938–2022), American painter
- Marshall Arnold (1845–1913), American politician
- Henry Marshall Ashby (1836–1868), Confederate Army officer
- Marshall Avener (born 1950), American gymnast
- Marshall Bang, Korean-American singer professionally known as Mrshll (also styled MRSHLL)
- Marshall Bell (born 1942), American actor
- Marshall Brain (1961–2024), American founder of HowStuffWorks.com
- Marshall Brickman (born 1939), American screenwriter
- Marshall Caifano, Chicago mobster
- Marshall Claxton (1811–1881), English painter
- Marshall "Eddie" Conway (1946–2023), American black nationalist
- Marshall Cousins (1869–1939), American businessman, politician, and historian
- Marshall Crenshaw (born 1953), American pop musician
- Marshall Faulk (born 1973), American football player
- Marshall Frost (born 2005), British trampoline gymnast
- Marshall Goldberg (1917–2006), American NFL All-Pro football halfback
- Marshall Lee Gore (1963–2013), American murderer and rapist
- Marshall Henderson (born 1990), American basketball player
- Marshall Holman (born 1954), American ten-pin bowler
- Marshall Kent (actor) (1908–1985), American actor
- Marshall Kent (bowler) (born 1992), American ten-pin bowler
- Marshall Lancaster (born 1974), English actor, best known as DC Chris Skelton in Life on Mars
- Marshall Loeb (1929–2017), American financial author
- Marshall Long (1936–2018), American businessman and politician
- Marshall Bruce Mathers III (born 1972), American rapper, known as Eminem
- Marshall Fletcher McCallie (born 1945), American diplomat
- Marshall Kirk McKusick (born 1954), American computer scientist
- Marshall McLuhan (1911–1980), Canadian educator, author, and media scholar
- Marshall Warren Nirenberg (1927–2010), American biochemist and geneticist, Nobel laureate
- Marshall Perron (born 1942), Chief Minister of the Northern Territory of Australia
- Marshall Pritchett (born 2006), American football player
- Marshall Rosenberg (1934–2015), American psychologist
- Marshall Rosenbluth (1927–2003), American physicist
- Marshall Vian Summers (born 1949), American prophet
- Marshall Teague (racing driver) (1921–1959), American race-car driver
- Marshall Teague (actor) (born 1953), American actor
- Marshall Stanley Uwom (born 1965), Commissioner, Rivers State Ministry of Agriculture, Nigeria
- Marshall Warren (born 2001), American ice hockey player

== Middle name ==
- Bartlett Marshall Low (1839–1893), American businessman and politician
- James Marshall Hendrix (1942–1970), American rock musician, known as Jimi Hendrix

== Fictional characters ==
- Marshall, character in the Paw Patrol series
- Marshall Eriksen, character in the How I Met Your Mother series
- Marshall Law, character in the Tekken video game series
- Marshall D. Teach, character in the One Piece series

== See also ==
- Marshal (surname)
- Marschall, German surname
