= John Marshall (disambiguation) =

John Marshall (1755–1835) was Chief Justice of the United States.

John Marshall or John Marshal may also refer to:

== Entertainment ==
- John Marshall (filmmaker) (1932–2005), American anthropologist and documentary filmmaker
- John Marshall (drummer) (1941–2023), British jazz rock drummer
- John C. Marshall (musician) (1941–2012), British jazz and blues guitarist
- John Marshall (musician) (born 1954), American percussionist
- John Marshall (cartoonist) (born 1955), American comic strip artist
- John Marshall (guitarist) (born 1962), American heavy metal guitarist.

== Law ==
- John George Marshall (1786–1880), lawyer, judge, and political figure in Nova Scotia, Canada
- John Marshall, Lord Curriehill (1794–1868), British judge
- John Augustine Marshall (1854–1941), U.S. federal judge
- John Marshall Harlan (1833–1911), U.S. Supreme Court justice
- John Marshall Harlan II (1899–1971), U.S. Supreme Court justice

== Military ==
- John Marshall (Royal Navy officer, born 1748) (1748–1819), British explorer, namesake of the Marshall Islands
- John Marshall (Royal Navy officer, born 1785) (1785–1850), British Royal Navy officer
- John Marshall (biographer) (c. 1784–1837), officer in the British Royal Navy and author
- John Houlton Marshall (1768–1837), Nova Scotia naval commander

== Politics ==
- John Marshal (died 1165) (1105–1165), minor Anglo-Norman nobleman during the reign of King Stephen
- John Marshall (MP for Cambridge), MP for Cambridge, 1388–1390
- John Marshall (MP for Totnes), MP for Totnes, 1395
- John Marshall (MP for New Romney), MP for New Romney, 1535–1539
- John Marshall (MP for Leeds) (1797–1836), English politician, Member of Parliament for Leeds
- John Marshall (industrialist) (1765–1845), British businessman and politician
- John Joseph Marshall (1807–1870), merchant and politician in Nova Scotia, Canada
- John H. Marshall (politician) (1841–1913), American politician from Pennsylvania
- John Marshall (Kentucky politician) (1856–1922), Lieutenant governor of Kentucky
- John Marshall (Kansas judge) (1858–1931) Justice of the Kansas Supreme Court
- John I. Marshall (1899–1976), politician in Nova Scotia, Canada
- John Marshall (Conservative politician) (1940–2025), British MEP, 1979–1989, and MP, 1987–1997
- John W. Marshall (born 1958), Virginia Secretary of Public Safety
- John Wesley Marshall (1869–1944), American politician in Texas

== Religion ==
- John Marshall (bishop) (died 1496), Bishop of Llandaff
- John Marshall (priest) (1534–1597), English Roman Catholic priest
- John Aloysius Marshall (1928–1994), American prelate of the Roman Catholic Church

== Science ==
- John Marshall (archaeologist) (1876–1958), Director-General of the Archaeological Survey of India, 1902–1928
- John Marshall (surgeon) (1818–1891), English surgeon and teacher of anatomy
- John C. Marshall (neuropsychologist) (1939–2007), British experimental psychologist
- John Marshall (eye laser scientist) (born 1943), British professor of ophthalmology
- John Marshall (oceanographer), American oceanographer
- John R. Marshall, physician and pioneer in fertility treatment
- J. Stewart Marshall (1911–1992), Canadian physicist and meteorologist

== Sports ==
=== Cricket ===
- John Marshall (cricketer, born 1796) (1796–1876), Australian cricketer
- John Marshall (cricketer, born 1816) (1816–1861), English cricketer
- John Marshall (cricketer, born 1837) (1837–1879), English clergyman and cricketer
- John Marshall (cricket writer)

=== Football and rugby ===
- John D. Marshall (American football) (1930–2008), American football and tennis coach, college athletics administrator
- John Marshall (American football) (1945–2021), NFL assistant coach
- John Marshall (footballer, born 1964), English footballer
- John Marshall (Third Lanark footballer), Scottish footballer
- John Marshall (rugby union) (1929–2012), Scotland rugby union player

=== Other sports ===
- John Marshall (swimmer) (1930–1957), Australian swimmer
- John Marshall (sailor) (born 1942), representative of United States at the 1972 Summer Olympics
- John Marshall (jockey) (c. 1958–2018), Australian jockey
- John Marshall (athlete) (born 1963), American middle-distance track athlete
- John Marshall (bowls), Scottish lawn bowler

== Others ==
- John Marshal, 2nd Baron Marshal (1292–1316), English aristocrat
- John Marshall (publisher) (1756–1824), London publisher who specialized in children's literature
- John Marshall (Newcastle publisher and printer) (fl.1810-1831)
- John Marshall (classicist) (1845–1915), British classicist and rector of the Royal High School, Edinburgh
- John Marshall (died 1928) (1860–1928), British antiquities art collector
- John Marshall (architect) (1864–1949), American architect
- John Marshall (Scottish sculptor) (1888–1952)
- John Marshall (American sculptor) (1932–2009), American sculptor
- John Marshall (railway historian) (1922–2008), English railway historian
- John Marshall (historian), British historian at Johns Hopkins University
- John Marshall (entrepreneur), American entrepreneur and inventor
- John P. Marshall (born 1978), British businessman
- John Sedberry Marshall (1898–1979), American scholar
- John T. Marshall, collector of vintage toys

== See also ==
- Chief Justice John Marshall, an 1883 sculpture in Washington, D.C.
- John Marshall Park, a park in Washington, D.C.
- John Marshall Law School (disambiguation)
- Jack Marshall (disambiguation)
- Jonathan Marshall (disambiguation)
