= Sir John Marshall =

Sir John Marshall may refer to:

- Jack Marshall (1912–1988), New Zealand politician
- John Marshall (archaeologist) (1876–1958), British archaeologist

== See also ==
- Sir John Marshal (1170?–1235), English baron and justice
- Jack Marshall (disambiguation)
- John Marshall (disambiguation)
