= C. I. Lewis =

American philosopher (1883–1964)

- Born: Clarence Irving Lewis; April 12, 1883; Stoneham, Massachusetts, U.S.
- Died: February 3, 1964 (aged 80); Menlo Park, California, U.S.

Education
- Education: Harvard University (BA, PhD)
- Thesis: The Place of Intuition in Knowledge (1910)
- Doctoral advisor: Josiah Royce
- Other advisor: William James

Philosophical work
- Era: 20th-century philosophy
- Region: Western philosophy
- School: Pragmatism; Analytic philosophy Epistemic coherentism
- Institutions: University of California, Berkeley; Harvard University; Stanford University
- Doctoral students: Brand Blanshard; Roderick Chisholm; Roderick Firth; Nelson Goodman; Norman Malcolm
- Notable students: Marjorie Grene; Charles Hartshorne; Thelma Z. Lavine; W. V. O. Quine; Wilfrid Sellars; Robert Paul Wolff
- Main interests: Epistemology; Logic; Ethics; Aesthetics
- Notable ideas: Conceptual pragmatism Symbolic modal logic Lewis algebra Qualia; Strict conditional

Clarence Irving Lewis (April 12, 1883 – February 3, 1964) was an American academic philosopher. He is considered the progenitor of modern modal logic and the founder of conceptual pragmatism. First a noted logician, he later branched into epistemology, and during the last 20 years of his life, he wrote much on ethics. The New York Times memorialized him as "a leading authority on symbolic logic and on the philosophic concepts of knowledge and value." He coined the term "Qualia" as used in philosophy, linguistics, and cognitive sciences.

== Biography ==
Lewis was born in Stoneham, Massachusetts. His father was a skilled worker in a shoe factory, and Lewis grew up in relatively humble circumstances. He discovered philosophy at age 13, when reading about the Greek pre-Socratics, Anaxagoras and Heraclitus in particular. The first work of philosophy Lewis recalled studying was A Short History of Greek Philosophy by John Marshall (1891). Immanuel Kant proved a major lifelong influence on Lewis's thinking. In his article "Logic and Pragmatism", Lewis wrote: "Nothing comparable in importance happened [in my life] until I became acquainted with Kant... Kant compelled me. He had, so I felt, followed scepticism to its inevitable last stage, and laid the foundations where they could not be disturbed."

In 1902, he entered Harvard University. Since his parents were not able to help him financially, he had to work as a waiter to earn his tuition. In 1905, Harvard College awarded Lewis the Bachelor of Arts cum laude after a mere three years of study, during which time he supported himself with part-time jobs. He then taught English for one year in a high school in Quincy, Massachusetts, then two years at the University of Colorado. In 1906, he married Mable Maxwell Graves.

In 1908, Lewis returned to Harvard and began a Ph.D. in philosophy, which he completed in a mere two years. He then taught philosophy at the University of California, 1911–20, after which he returned again to Harvard's philosophy department, where he taught until his 1953 retirement, eventually filling the Edgar Pierce Chair of Philosophy. His Harvard course on Kant's first Critique was among the most famous in undergraduate philosophy in the U.S. until he retired.

Lewis's life was not free of trials. His daughter died in October 1932 and he had a heart attack in 1933. Nevertheless, the publications of Lewis (1929) and Lewis and Langford (1932) attest to these years having been a highly productive period of his life. During this same period, he was elected to the American Academy of Arts and Sciences in 1929, and in 1933, he presided over the American Philosophical Association. He was elected to the American Philosophical Society in 1942.

Lewis accepted a visiting professorship at Stanford during 1957–58, where he presented his lectures for the last time. For the academic year 1959–60, he was a Fellow at the Center for Advanced Studies at Wesleyan University.

== Philosophical work ==
=== Logic ===
Lewis studied logic under his eventual Ph.D. thesis supervisor, Josiah Royce, and is a principal architect of modern philosophical logic. In 1912, two years after the publication of the first volume of Principia Mathematica, Lewis began publishing articles taking exception to Principia's pervasive use of material implication, more specifically, to Bertrand Russell's reading of a→b as "a implies b." Lewis restated this criticism in his reviews of both editions of Principia Mathematica. Lewis's reputation as a promising young logician was soon assured.

Material implication (the rule of inference which claims that stating "P implies Q" is equivalent to stating "Q OR not P") allows a true consequent to follow from a false antecedent (so if P is not true still Q may be true since you only stated what a true P implies, but did not state what is implied if P is untrue). Lewis proposed to replace the usage of material implication during discussions involving logic with the term strict implication, by which a (contingently) false antecedent, which is false but could have been true, does not always strictly imply a (contingently) true consequent, which is true but could have been false. The same logical result is implied, but in a clearer and more explicit way. Stating strictly that P implies Q is explicitly not stating what the untrue P implies. And therefore if P is not true, Q may be true, but may be false as well.

As opposed to material implication, in strict implication the statement is not primitive –it is not defined in positive terms, but rather in the combined terms of negation, conjunction, and a prefixed unary intensional modal operator: $\Diamond$. The following is its formal definition:

If X is a formula with a classical bivalent truth value
(which must be either true or false),
then $\Diamond$X can be read as "X is possibly true".

Lewis then defined "A strictly implies B" as "$\neg \Diamond$(A$\land \neg$B)". Lewis's strict implication is now a historical curiosity, but the formal modal logic in which he grounded that notion is the ancestor of all modern work on the subject. Lewis' $\Diamond$ notation is still standard, but current practice usually takes its dual, the square notation $\square$, meaning "necessity", which is stating a primitive notion, while the diamond notation, $\Diamond$, is left as a defined (derived) meaning. With square notation "A strictly implies B" is simply written as $\square$(A→B), which states explicitly that we are only implying the truth of B when A is true, and we are not implying anything about when B can be false, nor what A implies if it is false, in which case B can be false or B can just as well be true.

His first published monograph about advances in logic since the time of Leibniz, A Survey of Symbolic Logic (1918), culminating a series of articles written since 1900, went out of print after selling several hundred copies. At the time of its publication, it included the only discussion in English of the logical writings of Charles Sanders Peirce. This book followed Russell's 1900 monograph on Leibnitz, and in later editions he removed a section that seemed similar to it.

Lewis went on to devise modal logic which he described in his next book Symbolic Logic (1932) as possible formal analyses of the alethic modalities, modes of logical truth such as necessity, possibility and impossibility.

Several amended versions of his first book "A Survey of Symbolic Logic" have been written over the years, designated as S1 to S5, the last two, S4 and S5, generated much mathematical and philosophical interest, sustained to the present day and are the beginnings of what became the field of normal modal logic.

=== Pragmatist but no positivist ===
Around 1930, with the introduction of logical empiricism to America by German and Austrian philosophers fleeing Europe under Nazi Germany, American philosophy went through a turning point.

This new doctrine, with its emphasis on scientific models of knowledge and on the logical analysis of meaning, soon became dominant, challenging American philosophers such as Lewis who held a naturalistic or pragmatic approach.

Lewis was perceived as a logical empiricist, but actually differed with it on some major points, rejecting logical positivism, which is the notion that all genuine knowledge is derived solely from sensory experience as interpreted through reason and logic, and rejecting physicalism with its notion that the mind along with its experience is actually equivalent to physical entities such as the brain and the body. He held that experience should be analyzed separately, and that semiotic value does have cognitive significance.

Reflecting on the differences between pragmatism and positivism, Lewis devised the notion of cognitive structure, concluding that any significant knowledge must come from experience. Semiotic value, accordingly, is the way of representing this knowledge, which is stored for deciding future conduct.

Charles Sanders Peirce, the founder of pragmaticism, saw the world as a system of signs. Therefore, scientific research was a branch of semiotics, primarily needing to be analyzed and justified in semiotic terms before actually conducting any kind of experiment, and the meaning of meaning must be understood before anything else could be "explained." This included analyzing and studying what experience itself is. In Mind and the World Order (1929) Lewis explained that Peirce's "pragmatic test" of significance should be understood with Peirce's own limitation which prescribed meaning only to what makes a verfiable difference in experience although experience is subjective.

A year later, in Pragmatism and Current Thought (1930) he repeated this but emphasized the subjectiveness of experience. Concepts, according to Lewis' explanation of Peirce, are abstractions in which the experience is to be considered, rather than any "factual" or "immediate" truth.

The validation of the perceived experiences are achieved by doing comparison tests. For example, if one person perceives time or weight as double that of the other's perception, the two perceptions are never truly comparable. Thus a concept is a relational pattern.

Still, by checking the physical attributes which each of the two people assign to their experiences, in this case the weight and time in physical units, it is possible to analyze some part of the experience and one should not discard that very important aspect of the world as it is experienced.

In one sense, that of connotation, a concept strictly comprises nothing but an abstract configuration of relations. In another sense, its denotation or empirical application, this meaning is vested in a process which characteristically begins with something given and ends with something done in the operation which translates a presented datum into an instrument of prediction and control.

Thus knowledge begins and ends in experience, keeping in mind that the beginning and ending experiences differ.

Furthermore, according to Lewis' interpretation of Peirce, knowledge of something requires that the verifying experience itself be actually experienced as well.

Thus, for the pragmatist, verifiability as an operational definition (or test) of the empirical meaning of a statement requires that the speaker know how to apply that statement, when not to apply it, and that the speaker will be able to trace the consequences of the statement in situations both real and hypothetical.

Lewis firmly objected to the positivist interpretation of value statements as being merely "expressive," devoid of any cognitive content.

In his 1946 essay Logical Positivism and Pragmatism Lewis set out both his concept of sense meaning and his thesis that valuation is a form of empirical cognition. He disagreed with verificationism and preferred the term empirical meaning, claiming that pragmatism and logical positivism are forms of empiricism.

Lewis argued that there is a deep difference between the seemingly similar concepts of pragmatic meaning and the logical-positivist requirement of verification.

According to Lewis, pragmatism ultimately bases its understanding of meaning on conceivable experience, while positivism reduces the relation between meaning and experience to a matter of logical form. Thus, according to Lewis, the positivist view precisely omits the necessary empirical meaning as it would be called by the pragmatist.

Specifying which observational statements follow from a given sentence helps us determine the empirical meaning of the given sentence only if the observation statements themselves have an already understood meaning in terms of the experience to which the observation statements refer.

According to Lewis, the logical positivists failed to distinguish between "linguistic" meaning - the logical relations among terms, and "empirical" meaning - the relation that expressions must experience. (In Carnap and Charles W. Morris' terminology, empirical meaning falls under pragmatics, while linguistic meaning falls under semantics.) Lewis argues against the logical positivist who shuts their eyes to precisely that which properly confirms a sentence, namely the content of experience.

=== Epistemology ===
Lewis (1929), Mind and the World Order, is now seen as one of the most important 20th century works in epistemology. Since 2005, following Murray Murphey's book about Lewis and pragmatism, Lewis has been included among the American pragmatists. Lewis was an early exponent of coherentism, particularly as supported by probability observations such as those advocated by Thomas Bayes.

He was the first to employ the term "qualia", popularized by his doctoral student Nelson Goodman, in its generally agreed modern sense.

For Lewis, the mind's grasp of different possible worlds is mediated by facts. Lewis defines a fact as “that which a proposition (some actual or possible proposition) denotes or asserts.” For Lewis, facts, as opposed to objects, are the units of our knowledge, and facts are able to enter into inferential relationships with other facts such that one fact may imply or exclude another. Facts relate to each other such that they can form systems that describe possible worlds, but the facts themselves have the same logical relationships whether a world is actual or not. He says, “... the logical relations of facts are unaltered by their actuality or non-actuality, just as the logical relations of propositions are unaffected by their truth or falsity.”

=== Ethics and aesthetics ===
Lewis's late writings on ethics include the monographs Lewis (1955, 1957) and the posthumous collection Lewis (1969). From 1946 until his death, he wrote many drafts of chapters of a proposed treatise on ethics, which he did not live to complete. Instead, he published a few articles and gave a series of lectures: the Woodbridge Lectures at Columbia University, named "The Ground and Nature of the Right" (1955), the Powell Lectures at the Indiana University, named "Our Social Inheritance" (1957), and various lectures at Wesleyan University, posthumously named "Foundations of Ethics" (1959).

Scholars have varying hypotheses for why Lewis likely never published his treatise on ethics. For example, American philosopher Murray Murphey attributes this failure to Lewis's declining health. However, some academics have pushed back on this claim. In response to Murphey, Eric Dayton, a professor of philosophy at the University of Saskatchewan, posits that Lewis had ample time to finish the manuscript before his health began to deteriorate, arguing that there must have been other factors that ultimately prevented Lewis from formalizing his work.

Lewis's drafts on ethics are included in the Lewis papers held at Stanford University.

Lewis (1947) contains two chapters on aesthetics and the philosophy of art.

=== Legacy ===
Lewis's work has been relatively neglected in recent years, even though he set out his ideas at length. He can be understood as both a late pragmatist and an early analytic philosopher, and had students of the calibre of Brand Blanshard, Nelson Goodman, and Roderick Chisholm. Joel Isaac believes this neglect is justified. However, some scholars believe Lewis is best read as a foundationalist. For example, Griffin Klemick, a professor of philosophy at Hope College, believes that Lewis consistently endorses tenets of foundationalism throughout two of his major publications: Mind and the World-Order and An Analysis of Knowledge and Valuation. Klemick explains that Lewis argues for the existence of completely justified and unquestionable beliefs about our sensory experiences. According to Lewis, these beliefs stand independently, requiring no validation from objective empirical observations or external evidence, which aligns him with foundationalist thought.

Ten lectures and short articles that Lewis produced in the 1950s were collected and edited by John Lange in 1969. The collection, Values and Imperatives: Studies in Ethics, was published by Stanford University Press.

Lewis's reputation benefits from interest in his contributions to logic (particularly symbolic logic, binary relations, and modal logic) epistemology, and value theory, as well as his role in developing pragmatism within American philosophy.

There are 11.5 feet (3.51 m) linear feet of Lewis's papers at Stanford University Libraries.

== Works ==
- 1912: “Implication and the Algebra of Logic.” Mind, vol. 21, no. 84, 1912, pp. 522–31. via Internet Archive
- 1918: A Survey of Symbolic Logic. via Internet Archive. Republished in part by Dover in 1960.
- 1926: The Pragmatic Element in Knowledge, Howison Lecture, link via Internet Archive
- 1929. Mind and the World Order: Outline of a Theory of Knowledge. Dover reprint, 1956, link via Internet Archive
- 1932: —; Langford, Cooper Harold (1959) [1932]. Symbolic Logic (2 ed.). Dover Publications.
- 1946: An Analysis of Knowledge and Valuation, Open Court, link via Internet Archive
- 1955: The Ground and Nature of the Right. Columbia Univ. Press.
- 1957: Our Social Inheritance. Indiana Univ. Press.
- 1970: Collected Papers, editors J. D. Goheen and J. L. Mothershead Jr., Stanford University Press

== See also ==
- List of American philosophers
