= William Marshall =

William Marshall, William Marshal, or Bill Marshall may refer to:

== Politicians, noblemen and military leaders ==
- William Marshal, 1st Earl of Pembroke (1147–1219), Anglo Norman nobleman and crusader
- William Marshal, 2nd Earl of Pembroke (1190–1231), English nobleman, son of the above
- William Marshal, 1st Baron Marshal (1277–1314), slain at the Battle of Bannockburn
- William Marshall (1796–1872), British politician
- William Marshall (Australian politician) (1885–1952), Western Australia MLA
- William Marshall (British Army officer, born 1865), (1865–1939), British general
- William Marshall (British Army officer, born 1889), (1889–1918), British captain
- William Louis Marshall (1846–1920), scion of the family of Chief Justice John Marshall
- William Rainey Marshall (1825–1896), American politician; Republican governor of Minnesota, 1866–1870
- William Thomas Marshall (1854–1920), English recipient of the Victoria Cross
- William Marshall (Canadian politician) (1935–2023), lawyer, judge and politician in Newfoundland
- Bill Marshall (lawyer), Solicitor General of Ohio
- Billy Marshall (1672–1792), King of the Gypsies
- Will Marshall, one of the founders of the New Democrat movement
- Willy Marshall, American Libertarian politician

== Arts and entertainment ==
- William Marshall (actor) (1924–2003), African American actor in Blacula
- William Marshall (bandleader) (1917–1994), American singer and bandleader
- William Marshall (cinematographer) (1885–1943), American film technician
- William Marshall (illustrator) (fl. 1617–1649), English engraver and illustrator
- William Marshall (potter) (1923–2007), English studio potter
- William Marshall (Scottish composer) (1748–1833), Scottish composer
- Billy Marshall Stoneking (William Randolph Marshall, 1947–2016), American-Australian poet, playwright, filmmaker, and teacher
- William Calder Marshall (1813–1894), Scottish sculptor
- William Leonard Marshall (1944–2003), Australian author of mystery novels
- Bill Marshall (producer) (1939–2017), Scottish-born Canadian filmmaker, film and theater producer
- William Forbes Marshall (1888–1959), Ulster poet and Presbyterian minister

== Sports ==
- William Marshall (tennis) (1849–1921), English tennis player and architect
- William Marshall (rugby), Scottish rugby player
- William Marshall (field hockey), Scottish field hockey player
- William C. Marshall (1918–2005), Barbadian champion racehorse trainer
- William Marshall (Australian footballer) (1884–1971), Australian rules footballer in the VFL
- Doc Marshall (catcher) (William Riddle Marshall, 1875–1959), American baseball player
- Bill Marshall (American football) (1887–1926), founder and long-time head coach of the Detroit Heralds of the early National Football League
- Bill Marshall (baseball) (1911–1977), American Major League Baseball player
- Billy Marshall (1936–2007), Northern Irish footballer
- Harry Marshall (English footballer) (born William Harry Marshall, 1905–1959), English footballer
- Billy Marshall (footballer, born 1898) (1898–1966), English professional footballer
- Bill Marshall (Australian footballer) (1892–1945), Australian rules footballer
- Willie Marshall (ice hockey) (1930–2023), Canadian ice hockey player
- Willie Marshall (Scottish footballer) (1933–2021), Scottish footballer

== Others ==
- William Marshall (agricultural writer) (1745–1818), English writer and critic on agricultural and horticultural topics
- William Marshall (translator) (died 1540), client of Thomas Cromwell, translator of Marsiglio of Padua's Defensor Pacis
- William Marshall (teacher) (1817–1906), New Zealand teacher and clergyman
- William Crosby Marshall (1870–1934), American mechanical engineer and author
- William Marshall (entrepreneur), British physicist and entrepreneur
- William Marshall Jr. (1925–1997), American architect
- Bill Okyere Marshall (1933–2021), Ghanaian writer

== See also ==
- Marshall (name)
