= The Dictionary of Modern American Philosophers =

Biographical reference work

The Dictionary of Modern American Philosophers is a 2005 four-volume biographical reference work edited by John R. Shook, then of Oklahoma State University, published by Thoemmes Continuum. Its consulting editors were Richard T. Hull, Bruce Kuklick, Murray G. Murphey and John G. Slater. It was published online by Oxford Reference Online in 2010.

The Dictionary was reviewed in Library Journal by Edin Hadzic. The review notes that it "covers philosophical thought in the United States and Canada from 1860 to 1960", and "the term philosopher is employed somewhat loosely", while the editor's introduction states that "the label of 'philosopher' has been broadly applied ... to intellectuals who have made philosophical contributions regardless of academic career or professional title". Hadzik states that a "lack of sustained focus on philosophy in a narrower sense is an essential drawback". The Dictionary "seeks to countervail deep-seated prejudices by heavily representing women and minorities".
