= Alex Marshall =

Alex Marshall may refer to:

- Alex Marshall (Days of Our Lives), a character in Days of Our Lives
- Alex Marshall (actor and director) (born 1945), actress, later a television and theatre director
- Alex M. Loeb (1918–2015), American painter from the state of Mississippi
- Alex Marshall (police officer) (born 1961), Chief Constable of Hampshire Constabulary, England
- Alex T. Marshall (born June 28, 1989), American musician and former pianist and rhythm guitarist for The Cab
- Alex Marshall (bowls) (born 1967), British lawn bowler
- Alex Marshall (journalist) (born 1959), American journalist
- Alex Marshall (footballer) (born 1998), Jamaican footballer
- Alex Marshall, a pen name of Jesse Bullington, American fantasy writer

== See also ==
- Alexander Marshall (disambiguation)
