= Thomas Long (writer) =

English clergyman and writer

Thomas Long (1621–1707) was an English clergyman and writer on Church politics. He spent almost all of his life in Exeter.

== Life ==
He was educated at Exeter College, Oxford, where he graduated B.A. in 1642. He was prebendary of Exeter from 1600 to 1701.

== Writings ==
In 1678 he attacked the late John Hales, incidentally taking a swipe at Andrew Marvell.

After the Glorious Revolution he wrote from the Whig perspective, in A Resolution of Certain Queries (1689), advocating submission to the new government. He replied, however, to John Locke's A Letter Concerning Toleration (1689), by writing like Jonas Proast, a High Church critique of Locke’s advocacy of religious toleration.

After the 1690 republication of Eikonoklastes, he entered the controversy over the authorship of the Eikon Basilike, writing against Anthony Walker and supporting Richard Hollingworth. He also attacked the Unitarian tract The Naked Gospel (1690), the work of Arthur Bury.

== Works ==
- Mr. Hales's Treatise of Schism Examined and Censor'd (1678)
- A Resolution of Certain Queries (1689)
- The letter for toleration decipher’d, and the absurdity and impiety of an absolute toleration demonstrated (1689)
- An Answer to a Socinian Treatise called "The Naked Gospel" (1691)
- Dr. Walker's true, modest, and faithful account of the author of Eikon basilike, strictly examined, and demonstrated to be false, impudent, and deceitful (1693)
- Apostolic communion in the Church of England (1702)
