= A Letter Concerning Toleration =

1689 book by John Locke

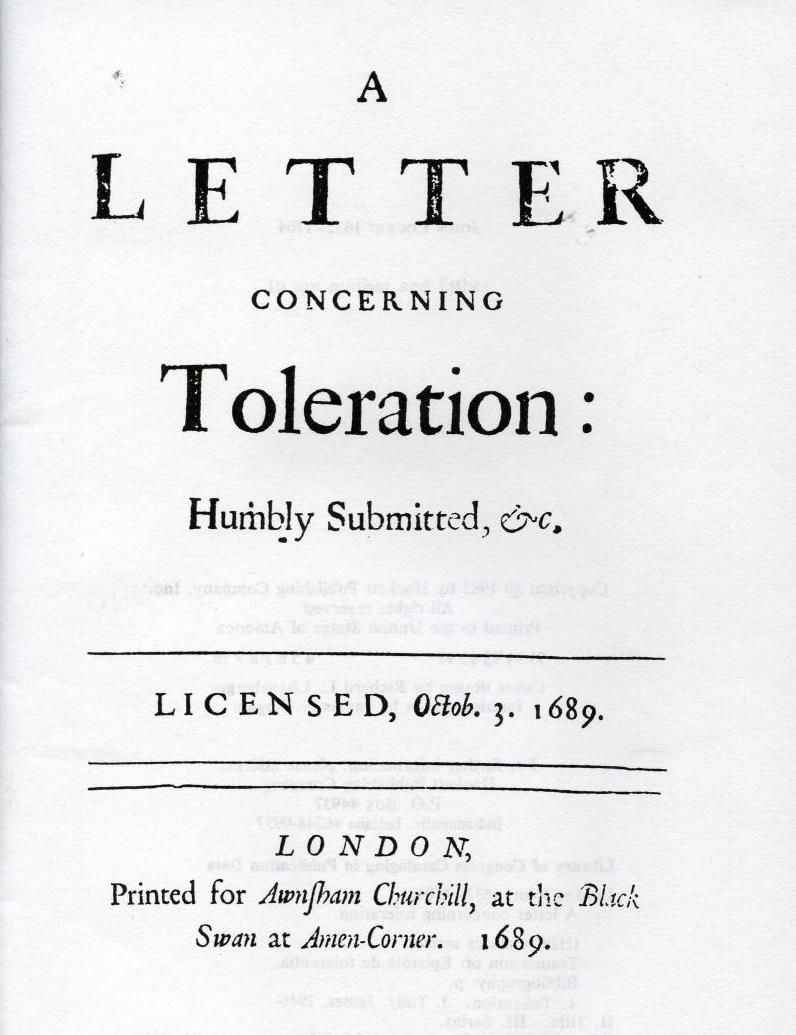
- Title page of the first English translation.
- Author: John Locke
- Original title: Epistola de Tolerantia
- Translator: William Popple
- Language: Latin
- Subject: Religious tolerance
- Published: 3 October 1689
- Text: A Letter Concerning Toleration at Wikisource

A Letter Concerning Toleration (Epistola de Tolerantia) by John Locke was written 1685-1686 when Locke was living in exile in the Netherlands, known for its religious tolerance. It is addressed to an anonymous "Honored Sir", later identified as Dutchman Philipp van Limborch. The Letter was originally composed in Latin and was published in English translation in 1689 by William Popple, without Locke's knowledge. The work was written amidst increasing religious turmoil in England. Locke argues for the separation of church and state, with religious toleration as a way to promote religious peace.

== Background ==
In the wake of the discovery of the Rye House Plot and Charles II's persecution of the Whigs, Locke fled England to Amsterdam in the Dutch Republic in September 1683. Throughout his life, Locke was interested in the debate about religious toleration. The question was much debated in Holland during Locke's stay, and in October 1685, Louis XIV of France revoked the Edict of Nantes, which had guaranteed religious toleration for French Protestants, in order to bring to an end to the French Wars of Religion (1562-1598).

In the Dutch Republic, Locke met Philipp van Limborch, a Professor of Divinity. It was to be a discussion with Limborch that persuaded Locke to temporarily put aside his work on An Essay Concerning Human Understanding and set down his ideas on religious toleration. Locke wrote the Letter during the winter of 1685–86.

== Argument of the Letter ==
One of the founders of Empiricism, Locke developed ideas contrary to those by Thomas Hobbes in Leviathan, in supporting toleration for various Christian denominations. Hobbes thought individuals could maintain their own religious beliefs, so long as they outwardly expressed those of the state. It has been argued that Locke's rejection of Catholicism was the ultimate basis for his rejection of the government's interest in spiritual salvation.

Toleration is central to Locke's political philosophy. Consequently, only churches that teach tolerance are allowed in his society. Locke's view on the difficulty of knowing the one true religion may suggest that religion is not personally important to Locke. Still, it also may point to the deep uncertainties surrounding religious belief in a time of political and intellectual conflict. In contrast, Locke's view on atheism suggests that he was far from considering religion unimportant. As an empiricist, he considered practical considerations, such as how the peace of civil society would be affected by religious toleration. Closely reading the text also reveals that Locke relies on Biblical analysis at several key points in his argument.

"That church can have no right to be tolerated by the magistrate," Locke argued, "which is so constituted that all who enter it ipso facto pass into the allegiance and service of another prince". If this were to be tolerated, "the magistrate would make room for a foreign jurisdiction in his territory and...allow for his people to be enlisted as soldiers against his government". This has been interpreted by historians as a reference to the Catholic Church, with the Pope being the prince to whom Catholics owed allegiance.

=== Catholics ===
More recently, scholars have challenged the idea that Locke opposed tolerating Catholics in all circumstances. Mark Goldie argues that the traditional interpretation of Locke's position on Catholics "needs finessing, since he did not exclude the theoretical possibility of tolerating Catholics...if Catholics could discard their uncivil beliefs, they could then be tolerated". Goldie asserts that Locke was opposed not to Catholicism as such but antinomianism, the belief that ordinary moral laws are superseded by religious truth. Scott Sowerby claims that Locke left open the possibility that Catholics could be tolerated, if they adopted tolerant principles and rejected political allegiance to the Pope.

John Marshall has argued that several passages in the Letter demonstrate that Locke thought that Catholics "in their terms of worship and religious speculative beliefs...deserved their worship to be free". Marshall also notes that "The combination of Locke's comments in the Letter suggests that during [its] composition ... Locke was once again struggling over how to discriminate between the series of associated political principles which for him made Catholics intolerable, and the religious worship and other religious beliefs of Catholics which deserved toleration." A confirmation of these positions seems to come from a 2019 discovery of a previously unknown manuscript, dated 1667–8, titled Reason for tolerating Papists equally with others, in which Locke makes his earliest arguments for religious toleration.

=== Non-Christians ===
Locke's rejection of religious coercion extended beyond England to non-Christian peoples more generally, including the Indigenous populations of the Americas. In the Letter, he argued that pagan subjects under a Christian ruler should not be deprived of life or property on account of their religion and warned against using salvation as a pretext for conquest. He explicitly rejected appeals to the biblical conquest of Canaan as a model for Christian states, insisting that Israel's theocratic history was unique and could not justify violence or dispossession in modern commonwealths.

The Letter is distinctive among Locke's writings on toleration for explicitly addressing Jews as citizens of England rather than merely as illustrative examples. Locke acknowledged the established presence of Jewish communities in late seventeenth-century London and argued that they should not be compelled to conform to Christian worship. He maintained that a Christian magistrate could legitimately govern Jewish subjects without forcing religious conformity. Locke criticized English authorities for restricting Jewish public worship, questioning why Jews were permitted private dwellings but denied synagogues, and arguing that public religious assembly posed no greater danger than private worship.

In one of the last paragraphs, Locke argued against atheists: "Lastly, those are not at all to be tolerated who deny the being of a God. Promises, covenants, and oaths, which are the bonds of human society, can have no hold upon an atheist. The taking away of God, though but even in thought, dissolves all; besides also, those that by their atheism undermine and destroy all religion, can have no pretence of religion whereupon to challenge the privilege of a toleration. As for other practical opinions, though not absolutely free from all error, if they do not tend to establish domination over others or civil impunity to the Church in which they are taught, there can be no reason why they should not be tolerated." This critique excluded all atheistic varieties of philosophy and all attempts to deduce ethics and natural law from purely secular premises. There exists also a passage added in a later edition of the Essay concerning Human Understanding, where Locke perhaps questioned "whether 'atheism' was necessarily inimical to political obedience."

== Reception ==
There were immediate responses from the High Church Anglican clergy, published by Thomas Long and Jonas Proast. Long believed the letter represented an atheistically disguised Jesuit plot for the Roman Catholic Church to gain dominance by bringing chaos and ruin to the English Church and State. Proast defended the view that the government has the right to use force to cause dissenters to reflect on the merits of Anglicanism, the True Religion. He also rejected at the outset the toleration of Jews. Proast's focus on this issue may have reflected contemporary uncertainty following the Toleration Act of 1689, which explicitly excluded Roman Catholics and atheists while remaining silent on Jews, a silence some interpreted as tacit approval. Proast denounced toleration as being motivated by commercial considerations, accusing its proponents of prioritizing trade over religious truth; although Locke himself did not advance an economic argument in the Letter, Proast appears to have assumed that the anonymous author's position was driven by material interests.

In A Second Letter Concerning Toleration (1690), written in response to Proast, Locke shifted from the largely secular defense of toleration in the first letter to an explicitly Christian and evangelical framework, arguing that coercion was ineffective in matters of faith and that toleration should serve as a means to Christian conversion rather than as an end in itself. Whereas the first letter treated Jewish toleration as intrinsically justified and politically harmless, the Second Letter revived Locke's earlier Carolina-era view that toleration was instrumentally valuable, both for its social and economic benefits and for its potential to advance Christianity through persuasion rather than force.

In 1689, an anonymous pamphlet, Liberty of Conscience Asserted and Vindicated, argued that Jews should be permitted freedom of conscience so long as they lived peaceably, a position that may reflect the influence of Locke's arguments on contemporary debates about religious toleration.
