= Leonel Marshall =

Leonel Marshall may refer to:

- Leonel Marshall Sr. (born 1954), Cuban volleyball player during 1970s and 80s; won bronze in 1976 Summer Olympics
- Leonel Marshall Jr. (born 1979), Cuban volleyball player, son of above; competed in 2000 Olympics; defected from Cuba

== See also ==
- Marshall (surname)
