= Bob Marshall =

Bob Marshall may refer to:

== Politicians ==
- Bob Marshall (California politician) (1934–2012), mayor of San Bruno, California
- Bob Marshall (Colorado politician), Democratic member of the Colorado House of Representatives
- Bob Marshall (Kansas politician), Republican member of the Kansas Senate
- Bob Marshall (Virginia politician) (born 1944), Republican member of the Virginia House of Delegates

== Others ==
- Bob Marshall (billiards player) (1910–2004), Australian and world billiards champion
- Bob Marshall (wilderness activist) (1901–1939), American forester, writer and wilderness activist
- Bob Marshall (footballer) (born 1940), former Australian rules footballer who played with South Melbourne in the Victorian Football League
- Bob Marshall (Canadian football) (1923–1992), Canadian football player
- Bob Marshall, bassist with John Miles

== See also ==
- Bob Marshall-Andrews (born 1944), British MP
- Bobby Marshall (disambiguation)
- Robert Marshall (disambiguation)
- Bob Marshall Wilderness, a congressionally designated wilderness area in Western Montana, named for Bob Marshall (wilderness activist)
- Bob Marshall Wilderness Complex, three wilderness areas in the state of Montana
