= St. Mary's Academy (Colorado) =

Catholic school in Colorado, US

Location
- 4545 South University Boulevard; Cherry Hills Village, Colorado 80113-6099; United States; 39°38′2″N 104°57′38″W

Information
- Other name: SMA
- Religious affiliation: Catholic Church (Sisters of Loretto)
- Established: 1864 (162 years ago)
- CEEB code: 060535
- President: Iswari Natarajan
- Principal: Michelle Hayden (High School); Dr. Andy Aldrich (Middle School); Kristina Carothers (Lower School)
- Faculty: 130
- Grades: PreK - Grade 8 (Co-Ed); Grade 9 - Grade 12 (Girls)
- Enrollment: 678 (2022-2023)
- Campus size: 24 Acres
- Campus type: Urban
- Colors: Navy blue and white
- Mascot: Wildcat
- Accreditation: National Association of Independent Schools Association of Colorado Independent Schools; National Coalition of Girls' Schools National Catholic Educational Association
- Website: www.stmarys.academy

St. Mary's Academy (SMA) is a Catholic, independent day school in the Loretto tradition located in Cherry Hills Village, Colorado. Founded by the Sisters of Loretto in 1864, St. Mary's Academy educates boys and girls. St. Mary's Academy is composed of a co-ed Lower School (co-ed Preschool through Grade 5) and Middle School (co-ed Grades 6-8), and continues its tradition as a college preparatory high school for girls (Grades 9-12). The U.S. Department of Education has honored St. Mary's Academy three times as a School of Excellence (a program initially titled Blue Ribbon Schools). St. Mary's Academy High School offers 26 AP courses.

== History ==
St. Mary's Academy is the oldest continuously operating pre-collegiate school in Denver, and has the distinction of awarding the first high school diploma in 1875, a year before Colorado became a state. Originally situated at 14th and California Streets on the edge of the prairie, in 1911 the school moved and built next door to Margaret “Molly” Brown on Pennsylvania Avenue. Needing additional space and recognizing that families were moving to the suburbs, St. Mary's Academy located to its current home in the early 1950s. Begun as a school for girls, boys were welcomed into all Lower and Middle School grades in the mid-1970s.

== Activities ==
- Numerous Destination Imagination teams form every year in Lower School. In 2014 an all-boy team finished in first place in the Scientific Category at the Global Finals.
- Middle School students travel to a buffalo ranch in Northern Colorado, Keystone Science Center, the East Coast, and Cochiti Pueblo in New Mexico for service.
- In its first year, the high school robotics team won awards in the 2013-2014 Denver and regional BEST Robotics Competition. They were the only all-girls team in that competition and are one of a handful of all-girl teams participating in the international FIRST Robotics Competition in 2014-2015.
- St. Mary's Academy offers opportunities to further engage with the Loretto Community: service work at Loretto Motherhouse in Kentucky, a trip to the United Nations and advocacy training at the El Paso/Juarez border.

== Athletics ==
Middle School Boys

- Baseball
- Basketball
- Cross Country
- Golf
- Lacrosse
- Soccer
- Tennis

Middle School Girls

- Basketball
- Cross Country
- Dance
- Field Hockey
- Golf
- Lacrosse
- Soccer
- Tennis
- Volleyball

High School Girls

- Basketball
- Cross Country
- Dance
- Field Hockey
- Golf
- Lacrosse
- Soccer
- Softball
- Swim & Dive
- Tennis
- Track & Field
- Volleyball

== Affiliations ==
Association of Colorado Independent Schools (ACIS)
National Association of Independent Schools (NAIS)
National Catholic Education Association
National Coalition of Girls’ Schools
Colorado High School Activities Association
3A Metropolitan League

== Notable alumnae ==
- Condoleezza Rice, U.S. Secretary of State, 2005-2009
- Jane Lubchenco, Administrator of the NOAA (National Oceanic and Atmospheric Administration), 2009-2013
- Donna J. Haraway, Professor Emerita in the History of Consciousness at the University of California, Santa Cruz; scholar in the field of science and technology studies; and influential feminist philosopher.
- Pam Solo, MacArthur Fellow, Arms Control and Economic Development Analyst

== Notes and references ==
- "St Mary’s Academy: 150 Years of Courage, Tenacity and Vision" (September–October 2014 issue of Colorado Heritage, the magazine of History Colorado).

Specific
