= David Marshall =

Dave Marshall or David Marshall may refer to:

== In politics ==
- David Marshall (Canadian politician) (1846–1920), member of the Canadian Parliament for Elgin East
- David Marshall (Singaporean politician) (1908–1995), Chief Minister of Singapore
- David Marshall (British politician) (born 1941), British Labour Party Member of Parliament, 1979–2008
- David A. Marshall (born 1978), American politician in Portland, Maine
- David Marshall (Arizona politician), Arizona State Representative

== In sports ==
- Dave Marshall (baseball) (1943–2019), American Major League Baseball outfielder
- David Marshall (cricketer, born 1935) (1935–2019), English cricketer
- David Marshall (cricketer, born 1946) (born 1946), former English cricketer
- Dave Marshall (Barbadian cricketer) (born 1972), Barbadian cricketer
- David Marshall (Australian footballer) (born 1960), Adelaide and Glenelg footballer
- David Marshall (Scottish footballer) (born 1985), Scottish international footballer
- David Marshall (ice hockey) (born 1985), American professional ice hockey player
- David Marshall (tennis coach) (born 1966), American tennis coach
- David Marshall (gridiron football) (born 1961), American football player

== Other people ==
- David Marshall (oceanographer) (born 1968), professor of physical oceanography
- Dave Marshall (musician), guitarist with Vince Neil and Slaughter

== See also ==
- David Marshall Grant (born 1955), American actor and playwright
- David Marshall Lang (1924–1991), British professor of Caucasian Studies
- David Marshall Mason (1865–1945), Scottish politician, banker and businessman
- David Marshall Williams (1900–1975), American firearm designer
