= James Parsons (footballer) =

Australian rules footballer

Personal information
- Born: 12 April 1997 (age 29)
- Original team: Norwood Football Club (Victoria) Eastern Ranges (TAC Cup)
- Draft: No. 27, 2016 rookie draft
- Debut: Round 3, 2017, Geelong vs. Melbourne, at Etihad Stadium
- Height: 189 cm (6 ft 2 in)
- Weight: 82 kg (181 lb)
- Position: Forward / midfielder

Club information
- Current club: Geelong
- Number: 34

Playing career^{1}
Years	Club	Games (Goals)
2017–2019	Geelong	35 (26)
- ^{1} Playing statistics correct to the end of 2020.

James Parsons (born 12 April 1997) is a former professional Australian rules footballer who currently plays for Box Hill Hawks team in the VFL. He previously played for the Geelong Football Club in the Australian Football League (AFL).

== AFL career ==
He was drafted by Geelong with their second selection and twenty-seventh overall in the 2016 rookie draft. He made his debut in the twenty-nine point win against Melbourne at Etihad Stadium in round three of the 2017 season.

== Post AFL ==
Parsons was delisted at the end of the 2020 season. He signed for the Carlton reserves in 2021. In 2022 he lined up with the Box Hill Hawks.

== Family history ==
Parsons's grandfather Peter Marshall played for Victorian Football League (VFL) club Collingwood during the 1960s.
