= Peter Marshall =

Peter Marshall may refer to:

== Literature ==
- Peter Marshall (novelist) (1939–1972), British novelist whose works include The Raging Moon and Excluded from the Cemetery
- Peter Marshall (travel writer), (born 1946) British travel writer whose works include Demanding the Impossible: A History of Anarchism and Europe's Lost Civilization
- Peter Marshall (journalist) (born 1952), British journalist and broadcaster BBC Newsnight
- Peter Marshall (historian) (born 1964), history professor at Warwick University
- P. J. Marshall (Peter James Marshall, 1933–2025), history professor at King's College London

== Entertainment ==
- Peter Marshall (entertainer) (1926–2024), American game show host of The Hollywood Squares, 1966–1981
- Peter Marshall (British broadcaster) (born 1945), British game show host of Sale of the Century in the 1980s

== Sports ==
- Peter Marshall (cricketer) (born 1963), New Zealand cricketer
- Peter Marshall (footballer, born 1942), Australian footballer for Collingwood in the 1960s
- Peter Marshall (footballer, born 1954), Australian footballer for Collingwood in the 1970s
- Peter Marshall (squash player) (born 1971), English squash player
- Peter Marshall (swimmer) (born 1982), American swimmer
- Peter Marshall (rugby union) (born 1955), Australian rugby union referee

== Other ==
- Peter Marshall (Presbyterian minister) (1902–1949), Scottish-born American Presbyterian pastor, chaplain of the United States Senate
- Peter Marshall (Anglican priest) (1940–2020), Anglican Dean of Worcester
- Peter Marshall (police officer) (born c. 1953), commissioner of New Zealand and the Solomon Islands police services
- Peter Marshall (diplomat) (1924–2023), British ambassador and Commonwealth Deputy Secretary-General (1983–88)
- Peter Paul Marshall (1830–1900), Scottish civil engineer, painter, and partner in Morris, Marshall, Faulkner & Co.
