= Alexander Marshall =

Alexander Marshall may refer to:

- Alexander Marshall (evangelist) (1846–1928), Plymouth Brethren evangelist
- Alexander Keith Marshall (1808–1884), US Representative from Kentucky
- Alexander Marshall (Australian politician) (1881–1966)
- Alexander Marshall (cricketer) (1820–1871), English cricketer
- Alexander J. Marshall (1803–1882), Virginia lawyer, businessman and politician

== See also ==
- Alex Marshall (disambiguation)
