= Alan Marshal =

Alan Marshal may refer to:

- Alan Marshal (cricketer) (1883–1915), Australian cricketer
- Alan Marshal (actor) (1909–1961), Australian-born actor in Hollywood

== See also ==
- Alan Marshall (disambiguation)
- Marshal (disambiguation)
