= Bobby Marshall (disambiguation) =

Bobby Marshall (1880–1958) was an American sportsman.

Bobby Marshall may also refer to:

- Bobby Marshall (footballer, born 1876) (1876–1931), Scottish footballer for Liverpool and Portsmouth
- Bobby Marshall (footballer, born 1903) (1903–1966), footballer for Sunderland, Manchester City and Stockport County
- Bobby Marshall (Home and Away), a character on Home and Away

== See also ==
- Bob Marshall (disambiguation)
- Robert Marshall (disambiguation)
