= Jonas Proast =

English priest and academic (c. 1640 – 1710)

Jonas Proast (c.1640−1710) was an English High Church Anglican clergyman and academic. He was an opponent of latitudinarianism, associated with Henry Dodwell, George Hickes, Thomas Hearne and John Edwards. He is now known for his controversy with John Locke, over Locke's Letter concerning Toleration.

== Life ==
He was born in Colchester. Proast was educated at The Queen's College, Oxford and ordained in 1669, and became chaplain of All Souls College, Oxford in 1677.

He left his Oxford chaplaincies at Queen's College and All Souls as the result of an extended controversy with Leopold William Finch, the Warden of All Souls. Finch wrote an account of the quarrel in The case of Mr. Jonas Proast (1693). According to Anthony à Wood Proast was first expelled by Finch for "not giving his vote for the warden when he stood to be History Professor and for being meddling and troublesome in the house." This was on the occasion in 1688 of the election, won by Henry Dodwell, for Camden Professor of History. Proast returned, though only in 1692, by the intervention of the Visitor, William Sancroft.

He became Archdeacon of Berkshire in 1698.

Proast reacted to the appearance of the English translation, by William Popple, of the Epistola de Tolerantia (Locke's Letter concerning Translation first appeared in this anonymous Latin version). In the anonymous reply, The argument of the Letter concerning toleration, briefly consider’d and answer’d (1690) he advocated for the possible moderate use of force in matters of religion. He argued that the magistrate had power to restrain false religion.

Proast's main point was that coercion may not lead directly to changed understanding of religion; but indirectly certain uses of force may actually inculcate beliefs or make the mind receptive to them. This argument aimed at undermining the premise of Locke's main argument on the ineffectiveness of intolerant behaviour and penal laws. Other arguments Proast makes include that, while civil societies were formed for primarily civil functions, they were not "the onely Ends for which they are designed." Because Eternal and religious matter impact society's welfare, the magistrate can concern himself with those matters as well.

Locke reacted with A Second Letter concerning Toleration later in 1690, though under a pseudonym Philanthropus. Proast followed up with a reply in February 1691. In this later letter, Proast expanded on his arguments, arguing that good ideas have sometimes needed force, while bad ideas have expanded because of force: "Neither does the true Religion always prevail, without the Assistance of the Powers in being; nor is it always the true Religion which does so spread and prevail" Proast also argues against Locke's suggestion that each national religion sees itself as equally valid for civil protection, since French Catholicism was a false religion, French laws requiring subjects to attend mass "can be no Laws, which require men to go to Mass; unless Man can make Laws against God's Laws" After a pause Locke produced a Third Letter later in 1692. It was eight years before Proast replied with A second letter to the author of the three letters for toleration (1704). In that year Locke died, and his Fourth Letter was a posthumous work.

As a consequence of the exchanges with Proast, Locke had to sharpen his arguments, and moved further onto the ground of religious skepticism.
