= Francis Marshall =

Francis Marshall may refer to:

- Francis Albert Marshall (1840–1889), British playwright
- Francis Marshall (United States Army officer) (1867–1922), U.S. Army general
- Francis Marshall (British Army officer) (1876–1942), British Army general
- Francis Marshall (physiologist) (1878–1949), British human physiologist
- Francis Marshall (cricketer) (1888–1955), English cricketer

== See also ==
- Frank Marshall (disambiguation)
- Frances Marshall (disambiguation)
