= Marshal (surname) =

Marshal is a surname, and may refer to:

- Alan Marshal (actor) (1909–1961), Australian in Hollywood
- Alan Marshal (cricketer) (1883–1915), Australian cricketer
- Aleksandr Marshal (born 1957), Russian singer, songwriter, and musician
- Alexander Marshal (c. 1620–1682), English entomologist
- Anselm Marshal (died 1245), Anglo-Norman nobleman
- Eva Marshal (1203–1246), Cambro-Norman noblewoman
- Isabel Marshal (1200–1240), medieval English countess
- John Marshal (Marshal of England) (c. 1105–1165), Anglo-Norman nobleman
- Lyndsey Marshal (born 1978), English actress
- Maud Marshal, Countess of Norfolk, Countess of Surrey (1192–1248), Anglo-Norman noblewoman
- William Marshal, 1st Earl of Pembroke (c. 1147–1219)

== See also ==
- Marshall (surname)
