= Robert Marshall =

Robert Marshall may refer to:

- Robert Marshall (magician), medieval magician's assistant allegedly involved in a plot to kill Edward II of England
- Robert Marshall (Irish judge) (1695–1774)
- Robert Marshall (New Brunswick politician) (1832–1904), businessman and politician in New Brunswick, Canada
- Robert Marshall (dramatist) (1863–1910), Scots playwright
- Robert Marshall (footballer) (1864–1924), Scottish footballer with Partick Thistle, Rangers, Scotland
- Robert Marshall (cricketer, born 1869) (1869–1937), English cricketer
- Robert Colin Marshall (1883–1962), Calgary mayor and Alberta MLA
- Robert C. Marshall (1888–1972), American football and basketball coach
- Robert George Marshall (1893-1957), American politician and businessman
- Bob Marshall (wilderness activist) (1901–1939), American wilderness activist
- Robert Marshall (cricketer, born 1912) (1912–1956), New Zealand cricketer
- Robert L. Marshall (1913–2008), educationalist
- Robert J. Marshall (1918–2008), American clergyman and religious leader
- Sir Robert Marshall (civil servant) (1920–2000), British civil servant
- Robert O. Marshall (1939–2015), American businessman charged with (and later convicted of) the contract killing of his wife, Maria
- Robert G. Marshall (born 1944), Virginia politician and Member of the Virginia House of Delegates
- Robert I. Marshall (1946–2024), American politician in Delaware
- Robert W. Marshall (born 1959), American priest and bishop
- Robert Neal Marshall (born 1960), American theatre and television actor
- Robert Marshall (writer) (born 1960), American writer, critic and artist
- Robert Marshall (snooker player) (born 1964), English snooker player
- Robert Marshall (bowls) (born 1964), Scottish international lawn bowler
- Róbert Marshall (born 1971), Icelandic politician

== See also ==
- Rob Marshall (born 1960), American film director and choreographer
- Bob Marshall (disambiguation)
- Bobby Marshall (disambiguation)
- Marshall Owen Roberts
- Marshall Roberts Collection
