= Alan Marshall =

Alan Marshall may refer to:

- Alan Marshall (Australian writer) (1902–1984), Australian writer
- Alan Marshall (cricketer) (1895–1973), India-born English cricketer
- Alan Marshall (historian) (born 1949), British historian of printing
- Alan Marshall (New Zealand author), New Zealand writer, scholar, and environmentalist
- Alan Marshall (producer) (born 1938), English film producer
- Alan Marshall, pen name used by American author Donald E. Westlake (1933–2008)
- Alan G. Marshall (1944–2025), American analytical chemist
- Alan Marshal (actor) (1909–1961), stage and film actor
- Jock Marshall (Alan John Marshall, 1911–1967), Australian writer and ornithologist

== See also ==
- Allan Marshall (1851–1915), New Zealand river captain and river engineer
- Allan Marshall (RAF officer), Royal Air Force officer
- Alan Marshal (disambiguation)
- Marshall (name)
