= Helen Marshall =

Helen Marshall may refer to:

- Helen M. Marshall (1929–2017), American politician from New York
- Helen Marshall (historian) (1898–?), American historian of nursing
- Helen Marshall (artist) (born 1971), British visual artist
- Helen Marshall (medical researcher) (born 1961), Australian vaccinologist
- Helen Marshall (writer) (born 1983), Canadian speculative fiction writer and academic
