= Frances Marshall =

Frances Marshall may refer to:

- Frances Partridge (1900–2004), née Marshall, English writer
- Frances L. Marshall (died 1920), British author

== See also ==
- Francis Marshall (disambiguation)
