= Peace Action =

American human rights organization

- Formation: November 1957; 68 years ago (as SANE)
- Founders: Lenore Marshall; Norman Cousins
- Type: Nonprofit
- Location: Silver Spring, Maryland, U.S.
- Executive Director: Jon Rainwater
- President: Kevin Martin
- Website: PeaceAction.org

Peace Action is a nonprofit organization whose focus is on preventing the deployment of nuclear weapons in space, thwarting weapons sales to countries with human rights violations, and promoting a new United States foreign policy based on common security and peaceful resolution to international conflicts.

Peace Action believes that every person has the right to live without the threat of nuclear weapons, that war is not a suitable response to conflict, and that the United States has the resources to both protect and provide for its citizens. Peace Action has over 100,000 members who belong to over 70 autonomous affiliate and chapter organizations.

The name "Peace Action" was adopted in 1993 by SANE / FREEZE, which had been formed in 1987 by the merger of the Committee for a SANE Nuclear Policy and the Nuclear Weapons Freeze Campaign (also known as "The Freeze").

== Campaigns ==
In 2003, Peace Action launched the Campaign for a New Foreign Policy, an initiative to build grassroots support and congressional pressure for a U.S. foreign policy based on human rights and democracy, nuclear disarmament and international cooperation.

Peace Action opposes the U.S. occupation of Iraq as well as any potential future action within that state to impose permanent military bases, any attempt to control Iraqi oil through U.S. government or corporate institutions, or any action on the part of the U.S. government to further influence the domestic policy of elected Iraqi officials. They lobby their activist network to demand a complete withdrawal from Iraq as soon as possible.

To prevent future wars, Peace Action lobbies its grassroots network to demand peaceful diplomacy with Iran. In December 2006 Peace Action began a petition to prevent war with Iran; to date there are over 44,000 names.

On the nuclear front, Peace Action took part in a coalition lobby effort with organizations like the Arms Control Association and the Council for a Livable World to zero out funding for the Reliable Replacement Warhead and Complex 2030. Efforts of the coalition helped stir the Senate Arms Services Committee to zero out the Administration’s $15 million RRW request for Navy research and development.

Peace Action participated in organizing People’s Climate March in September 2014. Peace Action believes war and militarism are interconnected with the climate crisis. The organization states that wars and militarism are the biggest obstacles to funding initiatives to address global warming. Both wars and climate crisis require a political solution which can become a reality only if the climate justice movement links to ending wars and militarism and the peace movement connects to justice: climate, economic and racial justice. Peace Action, as a national endorser, jumped into the organizing from the beginning, launching the Peoples Climate March Peace and Justice Hub. The Hub brought together peace and faith groups to organize a No War, No Warming contingent and rally. George Martin, Peace Action Education Fund board member; Cole Harrison, executive director of Massachusetts Peace Action (MAPA); Jim Anderson, Peace Action of New York State (PANYS) Chair; and Natia Bueno, PANYS Student Outreach Coordinator, led the way.

== Grassroots work ==
Peace Action has 100 chapters nationwide with a network of over 100,000 paying members. They send bi-weekly Action Alerts to almost 100,000 people worldwide, keeping them up to date on legislation regarding the Iraq war, nuclear disarmament, and preventing future wars with countries the former Bush administration deemed "rogue nations," like Iran. They also run a forum blog concerning issues of peace, nuclear abolition, and justice.

Their motto is "Peace Demands Action" and work on issues like Iraq, missile bases in Europe, or cutting the funding of new nuclear warheads . Peace Action’s goal is to organize the nation around issues of peace and justice through protests, congressional action, and lobby days. They recently organized a petition to let our leaders know that any war with Iran, particularly one that involves nuclear weapons, should not be an option.

Peace Action initiated the Student Peace Action Network (SPAN) in 1995 to bring the voices of young activists into the forefront of the peace movement. Youth actively engaged in peace issues lacked a systematic tool to unite and organize with other young people. SPAN addresses this problem by providing advocacy tools, a nationwide network of like-minded youth, information about the issues, and support for affiliate chapters. Through coordinated direct actions, demonstrations, teach-ins, letter-writing campaigns, dissemination of materials, and other tactics, SPAN activists all over the country challenge unjust policies and work for non-violent, constructive alternatives.

== History ==
Peace Action was founded as 'SANE' in 1957 by Lenore Marshall and Norman Cousins and others in response to the nuclear arms race and the Eisenhower administration's policies on the production and testing of nuclear weapons. William Sloane Coffin, former chaplain of Yale University and political activist, retired from Riverside Church to become President of SANE/FREEZE in 1987. The name "SANE" came from the concepts put forth by Erich Fromm in his book The Sane Society. The group's aim was to alert Americans of the threat of nuclear weapons. A full-page advertisement placed in The New York Times in November 1957 provoked a nationwide response, and by 1958 the membership of the organization had grown to 25,000. SANE was formally incorporated in July of that year.

Various influential people and celebrities began to get involved with the organization and show support for their cause. In 1959, Steve Allen hosted a meeting that founded the Hollywood SANE. Members included Marlon Brando, Henry Fonda, Marilyn Monroe, Arthur Miller, Harry Belafonte, and Ossie Davis. In 1960, a SANE rally held at Madison Square Garden attracted 20,000 to hear Eleanor Roosevelt, Norman Cousins, Norman Thomas, A. Philip Randolph, Walter Reuther, and Harry Belafonte call for an end to the arms race. International sponsors of SANE (including Martin Buber, Pablo Casals, Bertrand Russell and Albert Schweitzer) petitioned President John F. Kennedy to maintain a moratorium on testing in the atmosphere. Graphic Artists for SANE was also organized, with members that included Jules Feiffer, Ben Shahn, and Edward Sorel.

The group launched campaigns and rallies to drum up support for its cause and to put pressure on political figures. In 1961, SANE hosted an eight-day, 109-mile march from McGuire Air Force Base to the United Nations Plaza that was attended by more than 25,000 people. They organized a rally of over 10,000 people on "Cuba Sunday" to express concern and outrage over the Cuban Missile Crisis. Dr. Spock became a national sponsor and appeared in an ad stating "Dr. Spock is worried." The ad was printed in 700 papers worldwide.

=== Early political influence ===
As a way of seeing their goals achieved, SANE began working through its political lobbying programs. The organization began by pushing for the election of congressional candidates whose positions reflected those of the organization. In 1966, SANE formed the "Voter's Peace Pledge Campaign" to urge Congressional candidates to work for peace in Vietnam. They became one of the first national organizations to advocate removal of President Lyndon B. Johnson from office. They went on to endorse Eugene McCarthy as the Democratic presidential candidate in 1968.

SANE's Norman Cousins acted as an unofficial liaison between President Kennedy and Soviet Premier Nikita Khrushchev on the Partial Test Ban Treaty negotiations. The organization helped secure the passage of the War Powers Resolution. As the Vietnam War began to escalate, SANE organized a rally at Madison Square Garden that attracted 18,000 people opposing the war, as well as a march on Washington in November 1965 drawing 35,000. Three days after the march, Vice-president Hubert Humphrey met with SANE leaders Dr. Spock, Sanford Gottlieb, and Homer Jack "to openly, responsibly, and frankly discuss their proposals" to end the war. Many more SANE marches on Washington would occur throughout the war.

SANE would go on to criticize the Anti-Ballistic Missile Treaty and SALT agreements for ignoring offensive strategic weapons. Following Richard Nixon's re-election, SANE advocated Congressional cut-off of funds for the Vietnam war. After the end of the Vietnam War, SANE lobbied to have Congress end the bombing of Cambodia, and helped lead a successful effort to pass the War Powers Act. SANE would also take on the military budget, and produced the "America Has a Tapeworm" ad. Despite the end of the war, SANE continued actions throughout the 1970s that promoted its purpose.

=== Nuclear Weapons Freeze Campaign ===
During the 1980s, SANE continued to monitor the political and military actions of the U.S. government and beyond. In 1981, The Nuclear Weapons Freeze Campaign began with the purpose of pressuring the government to stop the nuclear arms build-up. The campaign was initiated by Randall Forsberg's call to "freeze and reverse the nuclear arms race". Many SANE leaders participated in the creation of 'the Freeze', as it was sometimes called, which was a grassroots-based confederation of groups spanning the country. Freeze leaders included Randall Forsberg, Helen Caldicott, Pam Solo, and Randy Kehler. Elected officials such as Rep. Patricia Schroeder and Sen. Ted Kennedy helped to lead the movement in Congress. The Freeze's grassroots network pushed for nuclear reductions through ballot initiatives in towns and cities across the nation.

Specifically, the Freeze's goal was to get the U.S. and the Soviet Union to simultaneously adopt a mutual freeze on the testing, production, and deployment of nuclear weapons and of missiles, as well as new aircraft designed primarily to deliver nuclear weapons. Much emphasis was put on the MX and Pershing II missiles. Randall Forsberg was the organizer who initiated this idea of the "mutual, verifiable" Freeze.

During 1982, the SANE political action committee was formed for the political election year. Aside from working to get selected candidates elected, it became a driving force behind many proposed nuclear freeze referendums. In a victory for both the Freeze campaign and SANE, Ronald Reagan proposed START I, part of a two-phase treaty between the U.S. and the USSR that would reduce overall warhead counts on any missile type.

In roughly the 1983–84 period, when the Nuclear Weapons Freeze Campaign was planning expansively around mass-movement fund raising, lobbying, and Political Action Committees (PACs), SANE was merged into that entity, though local SANE chapters would continue to hold meetings for some time to come. Specific congressional races were targeted, and some of the pro-Freeze candidates credited the movement, and the grass-roots funds it raised, with their success in getting elected, or re-elected, to Congress. From 1984 on, the movement had three actual legal entities, the 'Nuclear Weapons Freeze Campaign', with both public education and lobbying arms (501.C-3 and 501.C-4 corporations), and the Freeze Voter PAC (501.C-5).

During the 1980s, SANE/FREEZE expanded its work to oppose U.S. military intervention in El Salvador and to end U.S. military aid to the Contras in Nicaragua. The organization promoted its agenda in different ways. An ad was placed in Variety magazine signed by over 250 celebrities including Jack Lemmon, Burt Lancaster, James Earl Jones, Sally Field, Shirley MacLaine, and Ed Asner supporting its causes. A weekly radio program by SANE/FREEZE, "Consider the Alternatives", reaches 140 radio stations. Their door canvassing campaign reached 250,000 households.

=== The Gulf War and the War on Terror ===
Following Iraq's invasion of Kuwait, SANE/FREEZE opposed the U.S. military buildup in the Persian Gulf. Throughout the Gulf War, the organization coordinated anti-war marches in Washington, DC, helping to mobilize 500,000 protesters. Soon after, in 1993, SANE/FREEZE renamed itself Peace Action.

Of great concern to Peace Action in 1995 was the conference for review of the Nuclear Non-Proliferation Treaty. The signatories to the treaty decided by consensus to extend the treaty indefinitely and without conditions. The year also marked the 50th anniversary of the atomic bombing of Hiroshima and Nagasaki.

The next year Peace Action launched Peace Voter '96, the organization's largest nationally coordinated campaign since the mid-1980s. Over one million Peace Voter Guides were distributed for the November elections. Also that year, Peace Action joined human-rights groups to stop major weapons sales to Indonesia and Turkey. In 1997, Indonesia withdrew its request for U.S. fighter jets due to "unwarranted criticism" of their human-rights record.

In 1999, Peace Action opposed the NATO bombing of Kosovo, which it described as "cruise missile humanitarianism", and founded the National Coalition for Peace and Justice, a body uniting most of the major peace groups in the country. Also that year, Peace Action commemorated the bombing of Nagasaki by staging a demonstration at Los Alamos National Laboratory in New Mexico. The demonstration was led by actor Martin Sheen.

Following the September 11, 2001 attacks, Peace Action responded to the war on terrorism and the bombing of Afghanistan with a call for justice, not war. The group went on to participate in two national coalitions: Win Without War and United for Peace and Justice.

== See also ==
- Committee for Non-Violent Action
- Department of Peace
- List of anti-war organizations
- List of peace activists
- Nuclear weapons
