= 1974 United States Senate election in Arizona =

- November 5, 1974
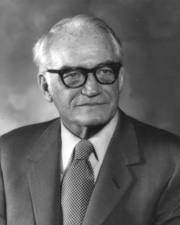

Nominee	Barry Goldwater	Jonathan Marshall
Party	Republican	Democratic
Popular vote	320,396	229,523
Percentage	58.26%	41.74%
- County results Goldwater: 50–60% 60–70% Marshall: 50–60% 60–70%
U.S. senator before election
Barry Goldwater
Republican
Elected U.S. Senator
Barry Goldwater
Republican

The 1974 United States Senate election in Arizona took place on November 5, 1974. Incumbent Republican U.S. Senator Barry Goldwater decided to run for reelection to a second consecutive term, after returning to the U.S. Senate in 1968 following his failed presidential run in 1964 against Lyndon B. Johnson. Goldwater defeated Democratic Party nominee philanthropist Jonathan Marshall in the general election.

== Republican primary ==
=== Candidates ===
- Barry Goldwater, incumbent U.S. senator

== Democratic primary ==
=== Candidates ===
- William Mathews Feighan
- Jonathan Marshall, philanthropist
- George Oglesby, attorney

=== Results ===
Democratic primary results
Party	Candidate	Votes	%
Democratic	Jonathan Marshall	79,225	53.6%
Democratic	George Oglesby	36,262	24.5%
Democratic	William Mathews Feighan	32,449	21.9%
Total votes		147,936	100.0

== General election ==
United States Senate election in Arizona, 1974
Party	Candidate	Votes	%	±%
Republican	Barry Goldwater (incumbent)	320,396	58.26%	+1.04%
Democratic	Jonathan Marshall	229,523	41.74%	−1.04%
Majority		90,873	16.52%	+2.09%
Turnout		549,919		
Republican hold		Swing		

== See also ==
- United States Senate elections, 1974 and 1975
