= Jonathan Marshall =

Jonathan Marshall may refer to:

- Jonathan Marshall (publisher) (1924–2008), American newspaper publisher, philanthropist, political candidate
- Jonathan Marshall (American football) (born 1997), American football defensive tackle
- Jonathan Marshall, American auto racing executive with Race Team Alliance

== See also ==
- John Marshall (disambiguation)
