= John T. Marshall =

John T. "Toyzilla" Marshall is an author, pop culture expert, comic book writer, and film producer. He has written five reference books on vintage toys: (GI Joe And Other Backyard Heroes (1997), Action Figures of the 1980s (1998), Action Figures of the 1960s (1998), Comic Book Hero Toys (1999), and Collecting Monster Toys (1999), all published by Schiffer Publishing).

Also, he has been a columnist for Toy Shop, Collectors' Showcase, and Collecting Toys and a contributor to several notable books on vintage toys, such as The Collectible GI Joe by Derryl DePriest.

In 1993, he formed a comic book publishing company, Marshall Comics, and later wrote for independent comic book publisher Antarctic Press, including seven issues of Ninja High School. In 2007, he wrote and produced an independent film, Slammerella, co-starring Tiffany Pao.
