= Bob Marshall (Canadian football) =

Canadian football player (1923–1992)

Profile
- Position: Halfback

Personal information
- Born: October 29, 1923; Oshawa, Ontario
- Died: June 19, 1992 (aged 68); Brockville, Ontario
- Listed height: 6 ft 3 in (1.91 m)
- Listed weight: 235 lb (107 kg)

Career history
- 1945–1946: Toronto Argonauts

Awards and highlights
- Grey Cup champion (1952)

Robert Whitehead Marshall (October 29, 1923 – June 19, 1992) was a Canadian professional football player who played for the Toronto Argonauts and Ottawa Rough Riders. He won the Grey Cup with Toronto in 1952. He also attended and played football at McGill University. Marshall also played junior hockey briefly in Stratford, Ontario, making it to the Memorial Cup Championship. Marshall later studied law and became a businessman. In 1984 he had a leg amputated, and the following year he was inducted into the North Bay Sports Hall of Fame in February 1985. He died in 1992.
