= William Popple =

English Unitarian merchant

To be distinguished from his grandson William Popple (colonial administrator) (1701–1764), government official and writer.

William Popple (1638–1708) was an English Unitarian merchant, the translator into English of John Locke's A Letter Concerning Toleration.

== Life ==
He was son of Edmund Popple, sheriff of Hull in 1638, who married Mary, daughter of the Rev. Andrew Marvell, and sister of Andrew Marvell the poet; he was therefore the nephew of Marvell, under whose guidance he was educated, and with whom he corresponded. He became a London merchant, and in 1676 was residing at Bordeaux. Ten years later, he dated from there a small expository work, entitled A Rational Catechism (London, 1687).

He was appointed secretary to the board of trade in 1696, and became intimate with John Locke (a commissioner of the board from 1696 to 1700), whose Letter on toleration he was the first to translate from the Latin (London, 1689). Some manuscript translations in his hand are in the British Library (Add MS 8888).

He died in 1708, in the parish of St Clement Danes; his widow Mary was living in Holborn in 1709.
