= Benjamin Marshall =

Ben, Benny or Benjamin Marshall may refer to:

- Benjamin Marshall (painter) (1768–1835), English sporting and animal painter
- Benjamin H. Marshall (1874–1944), American architect with Chicago firm Marshall and Fox
- Benny Marshall (1919–1969), American sportswriter in Alabama
- Ben Marshall (rugby union) (born 1990), Irish loose forward
- Ben Marshall (footballer) (born 1991), English winger and right back
- Ben Marshall (born 1992), American ice hockey player in 2010–11 USHL season
- Ben Marshall (comedian), American comedian and comedy writer; member of Please Don't Destroy

== Characters ==
- Benjamin Marshall (Shortland Street), played by Graham Puddle on New Zealand soap from 1993 to 2005

== See also ==
- Benjamin Marshall House, American 19th-century landmark
