= William Marshall (teacher) =

New Zealand teacher and clergyman

William Marshall (c.1817–25 April 1906) was a New Zealand teacher and clergyman. He was born in London, in c.1817.
