= David Marshall (cricketer, born 1935) =

English cricketer and educator (1935–2019)

Personal information
- Full name: David Alexander Cadman Marshall
- Born: 29 December 1935; Dore, Yorkshire, England
- Died: 6 January 2019 (aged 83); Bourton, Warwickshire, England
- Batting: Right-handed
- Bowling: Leg break
- Relatives: John Marshall (brother)

Domestic team information
- Years: Team
- 1957: Oxford University

Career statistics
Competition	First-class
Matches	1
Runs scored	68
Batting average	–
100s/50s	–/1
Top score	54*
Catches/stumpings	1/–
- Source: Cricinfo, 11 April 2020

David Alexander Cadman Marshall (29 December 1935 – 2 January 2019) was an English first-class cricketer and educator.

Marshall was born in December 1935 at Dore, Yorkshire. He was educated at Rugby School, before going up to Brasenose College, Oxford. While studying at Oxford, he made a single appearance in first-class cricket for Oxford University against the Free Foresters at Oxford in 1957. Batting twice in the match, he ended the Oxford first innings of 347 for 6 declared unbeaten on 54, while in their second innings of 166 for 5 he was unbeaten on 14.

After graduating from Oxford, Marshall became a schoolteacher. He became the headmaster of Musselburgh Grammar School in August 1967. He died in January 2019 at Bourton, Warwickshire. His brother, John, also played first-class cricket.
