= Helen Marshall (artist) =

British visual artist (born 1971)

Helen Marshall (born 1971) is a British visual artist working with photography and new media. She is best known for her socially engaged and participatory approach to creating public art works which are held in public and private collections. These are often situated in the wider public realm rather than in the context of the gallery or museum. Her work is held in public and private collections, many of which commemorate and celebrate historic events, well-known figures and ordinary individuals. Marshall is an honorary member of the Townswomen's Guilds.

Some of the public art works that she is most noted for include a record-breaking photo mosaic measuring 857.3 square metres (9,228 sq ft) and including 112,896 photographs, The Big Picture, (2008), a portrait of 17-year-old Arthur James Bunce training as an amateur boxer which was unveiled outside Thinktank, Birmingham Science Museum at Millennium Point and a diptych photo mosaic depicting the Queen at the time of her coronation in 1953 and her Diamond Jubilee in 2012. This 38 square metre work consisting of 5,000 photos is currently installed at Terminal 2 in Gatwick Airport, south east England.

== Life and career ==
Marshall was born in Oxfordshire, England in 1971 and moved to East London in 1998 where her art and design studio is based. She began studying at a time when traditional and analogue practices in photography were being superseded by digital technologies and the World Wide Web. She studied at Bournemouth and Poole College of Art and Design, now the Arts University Bournemouth in southern England from 1990 through 1992, he studied at Bournemouth and Poole College of Art and Design (now Arts University Bournemouth). She studied at the University of Wales Institute (1997) and gained a Masters in Photography in 2010 from the University of Westminster.

Marshall has worked on numerous (public) art projects with organisations such as the Clod Ensemble, Westminster Arts, a New Direction, Chisenhale Gallery and Tate Britain. She co-curated and produced Miss Mao with the Gao Brothers, who she met in 2006 when she travelled to Beijing China. The group exhibition was held in her home in East London. In 2006, she created a photo mosaic, The Peoples' Poppy, on the concourse of Victoria Station in London for the Royal British Legion and, a year later she was commissioned to produce an interactive, print and web-based montage for The Photographers’ Gallery composed of thousands of images sourced from photographers around the world. These early artworks are precursors to the large-scale photo mosaics for which Marshall is best known.

Yuval Noah Harari wrote about the process by which Marshall created her mosaic of Facebook founder Mark Zuckerberg in the Financial Times, noting that "the process by which collective images become a single image is described by Marshall as a 'scientific experiment' but also an 'intuitive process'. As part of her process, these images, anywhere up to 20,000, are fed into a computer and, using a mathematical algorithm she then arranges the images to depict her base image. For The Face of World War One, she produced a mosaic containing more than 30,000 photographs captured across the nation during the BBC World War One at Home Live Events. This portrait commemorated the sacrifices made by people during World War One and how these have shaped the face of today.Face of World War One

In 2016, she set up an artist-led photography and design studio, The People's Picture, which uses visual storytelling to create digital photo mosaics made up of thousands of public, historic and archival photographs. Many of these works commemorate and celebrate historic events and notable individuals. Marshall invited the Indonesian artist and patron of the Risang Yuwono, for Project Tobong, a project focusing on one of the last remaining theatre troupes in Yogyakarta, Java. In 2019, to mark the 50th anniversary of Apollo 11 and NASA's first Moon landing, The People's Moon, projected an interactive digital photo mosaic of a giant Moon onto the screens in London's Piccadilly Circus at the exact time a human first stepped onto the Moon. Other recent works of note include The Face of Suffrage, a floor-based, 200 metre-square, photo mosaic of Hilda Burkitt who was a leading figure in the early days of the women's suffrage movement in the West Midlands. The artwork was made up more than 3,700 images including historical pictures of women involved in the suffragette movement from the West Midlands in the early 1900s and user-submitted photographs of contemporary females. The work was displayed on the concourse of Birmingham New Street railway station to commemorate 100 years since some women voted for the first time.

Marshall was the lead artist commissioned in 2018 to create The Face of Stoke-on-Trent, a collaborative photography project with local photographers. Over 3550 portraits were merged into a giant photo mosaic representing the Face of Stoke-on-Trent, a 21-year old Stoke citizen, Jozef Clarke. It was commissioned by Stoke City Council to support the city's bid to be UK City of Culture 2021. The same year, she created, the Face of Suffrage artwork, a floor-based, 200 metre-square photo mosaic, made up of more than 3,700 images of females from across the West Midlands and LSE London School of Economics Women's Library. A floor-based, 200 metre-square, photo mosaic of Hilda Burkitt who was a leading figure in the early days of the women's suffrage movement in the West Midlands. The artwork was made up more than 3,700 images including historical pictures of women involved in the suffragette movement from the West Midlands in the early 1900s and user-submitted photographs of contemporary females. The work was displayed on the concourse of Birmingham New Street railway station to commemorate 100 years since some women voted for the first time. Selected Solo Exhibitions, Residencies and Commissions.

To mark the 50th anniversary of Apollo 11 and NASA's first Moon landing, The People's Moon, 2019 projected an interactive digital photo mosaic of a giant Moon onto the screens in London's Piccadilly Circus at the exact time a human first stepped onto the Moon. Working with the Aldrin Family Foundation and Lord Andrew Mawson, the images were sourced from NASA's archives as well as from a public call to submit photos relating to space and the Moon. The work was simultaneously projected onto screens at global locations including Times Square, Kennedy Space Visitor Center, New York City and the ArtsScience Museum Singapore on 20 July 2019.

== Selected solo exhibitions, residences and commissions ==
- "Project Tobong", Horniman Museum & Gardens, (London), 2016
- "Frame It, Big & Small Project", Tate Britain (London) 2010
- "Secret Gardens", Lu Feifei & Helen Marshall, Gao Brothers Art Center (Beijing), 2007
- Red Ladies video, The Clod Ensemble, (London), 2006–8

== Selected public art works ==
- Girl Done Good, Ashcroft Playhouse, (Croydon), 2019
- The Face of Suffrage, Birmingham New Street station, (Birmingham), 2018
- My Snowman, Brighton Museum (Brighton), 2018
- The Face of Stoke-on-Trent, City Centre, (Stoke-on-Trent Council), 2017
- Digital Graffiti Festival, Alys Beach, Florida, 2017
- The Face of WW1, BBC Home Live Events, 2014
- The Peoples' Monarch, Gatwick Airport, Turner Contemporary (Margate), 2012
- The Peoples' Poppy, Royal British Legion, Victoria Station Concourse (London), 2006
