= Humphrey Marshall =

Humphrey Marshall may refer to:

- Humphry Marshall (1722–1801), botanist
- Humphrey Marshall (general) (1812–1872), Confederate general in the American Civil War
- Humphrey Marshall (politician) (1760–1841), United States Senator from Kentucky; grandfather of the Civil War general
