= Stephen Marshall =

Stephen, Steven, or Steve Marshall may refer to:

== Politics ==
- Steve Marshall (born 1964), Attorney General of Alabama
- Steven Marshall (born 1968), 46th Premier of South Australia

== Sports ==
- Steve Marshall (wrestler) (born 1960), Canadian wrestler
- Steven Marshall (volleyball) (born 1989), Canadian volleyball player

== Crime ==
- Stephen Marshall, found guilty of the murder of Jeffrey Howe in England in 2009
- Stephen Marshall (murderer) (1985–2006), American-Canadian who shot two sex offenders in Maine in 2006

== Others ==
- Stephen Marshall (minister) (c.1594–1655), English Nonconformist minister
- Steven Marshall (businessman) (1957–2017), British business executive, chief executive of Railtrack
- Stephen Marshall (writer), Canadian writer, film director, and internet entrepreneur
- Steve Marshall (magician), American magician, clown, writer and artist
- Steven Marshall (whistleblower) (born 1989), Australian watch house officer

== See also ==
- Steven Marshall Crabb (born 1943), former member of the Victorian Legislative Assembly
