= Bob Marshall (footballer) =

Australian rules footballer

Personal information
- Full name: Bob Marshall
- Born: 15 May 1940 (age 86)
- Original team: Frankston
- Height: 179 cm (5 ft 10 in)
- Weight: 77 kg (170 lb)

Playing career^{1}
| Years | Club | Games (Goals) |
| 1959 | South Melbourne | 8 (0) |
- ^{1} Playing statistics correct to the end of 1959.

Bob Marshall (born 15 May 1940) is a former Australian rules footballer who played with South Melbourne in the Victorian Football League (VFL).
