= Roger Marshall (disambiguation) =

Roger Marshall (born 1960) is an U.S. Senator from Kansas.

Roger Marshall may also refer to:

- Roger Marshall (cricketer) (born 1952), English cricketer
- Roger Marshall (screenwriter) (1934–2020), English screenwriter
