= Alexander Marshall (cricketer) =

English cricketer (1820–1871)

Alexander Marshall (31 October 1820 – 28 September 1871) was an English first-class cricketer active 1849–60 who played for Surrey. He was born and died in Godalming. He played in 26 first-class matches.
