= Francis Marshall (cricketer) =

English cricketer

Personal information
- Full name: Francis William Marshall
- Born: 30 January 1888; Rugby, Warwickshire, England
- Died: 24 May 1955 (aged 67); Kensington, London, England
- Batting: Right-handed

Domestic team information
- Years: Team
- 1922: Warwickshire

Career statistics
Competition	First-class
Matches	2
Runs scored	14
Batting average	7.00
100s/50s	–/–
Top score	10
Balls bowled	–
Wickets	–
Bowling average	–
5 wickets in innings	–
10 wickets in match	–
Best bowling	–
Catches/stumpings	–/–
- Source: Cricinfo, 7 May 2012

Francis William Marshall (30 January 1888 – 24 May 1955) was an English cricketer. Marshall was a right-handed batsman. He was born at Rugby, Warwickshire.

Marshall made two first-class appearances for Warwickshire in the 1922 County Championship, with both matches coming against Lancashire. In the first match at Old Trafford, Marshall wasn't required to bat in a rain which was curtailed due to rain. In his second appearance at Edgbaston, Marshall made scores of 10 in Warwickshire's first-innings, before being dismissed by Cec Parkin, and 4 runs in their second-innings, before being dismissed by the same bowler. The match ended in a Lancashire victory by 7 wickets.

He died at Kensington, London, on 24 May 1955.
