= Alex Marshall (journalist) =

American journalist (born 1959)

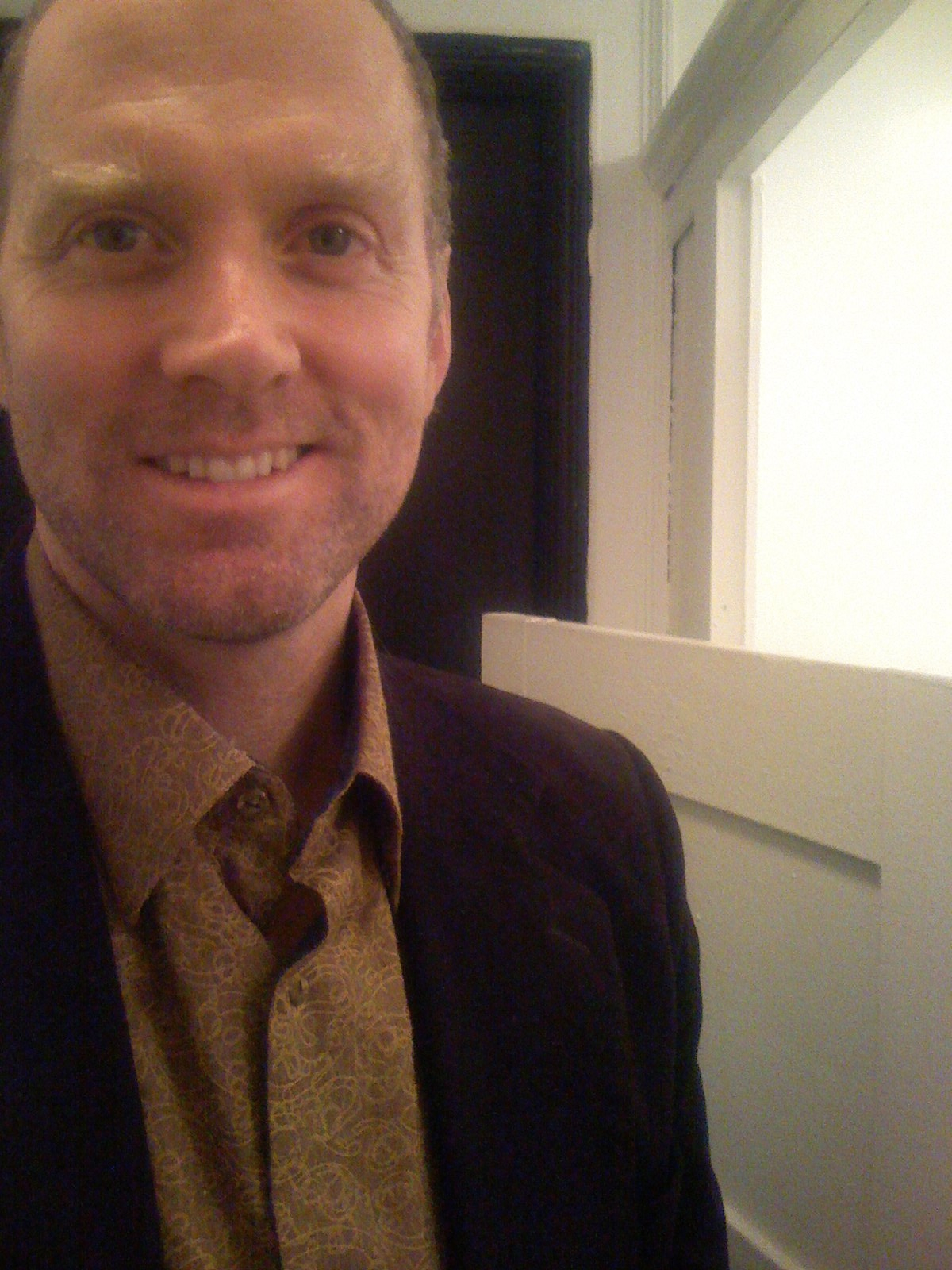
- Born: Alexander Campbell Marshall; May 7, 1959 (age 67); Norfolk, Virginia, U.S.
- Education: B.S., Political Economy & Spanish, Carnegie Mellon University, 1983; M.S., Journalism, Columbia University Graduate School of Journalism, 1988
- Occupation: Journalist
- Writing career
- Genres: Non-fiction, journalism, commentary
- Subjects: Urban design, transportation, economics
- Notable works: How Cities Work: Suburbs, Sprawl and the Roads Not Taken; Beneath the Metropolis: The Secret Lives of Cities; The Surprising Design of Market Economies
- Website: www.alexmarshall.org

Alex Marshall (born May 7, 1959) is an American journalist who writes and speaks about urban planning, transportation, and political economy. He is a former Senior Fellow of the Regional Plan Association and contributes to publications concerned with urban design, municipal government, architecture, and related matters — including Metropolis and Governing. He has also contributed to The New York Times, The Washington Post, The Boston Globe, and other newspapers and magazines.

Marshall has authored the books How Cities Work: Suburbs, Sprawl and the Roads Not Taken, Beneath the Metropolis: The Secret Lives of Cities, and The Surprising Design of Market Economies (Texas 2012).

== Background ==
Marshall was born in Norfolk, Virginia, to John Francis Marshall Jr. and Eleanor Jackson Marshall. Marshall's great-grandfather, Albert H. Grandy, founded The Virginian-Pilot newspaper in Norfolk in 1898, and was its first publisher and editor-in-chief.

After attending Woodberry Forest School in the class year of 1978, Marshall received a dual Bachelor of Science degree in political economy and Spanish from Carnegie Mellon University in 1983 and a master's degree in journalism from Columbia University Graduate School of Journalism in 1988. He studied at the Harvard Graduate School of Design during the 1999–2000 academic year as a Loeb fellow.

Marshall lived from 2003 to 2022 with his wife Kristi Barlow in Brooklyn, New York, where the couple were noted for their attempt between 2008 and 2010 to organize a cohousing community in Brooklyn.

== Career ==
From 1988 to 1997, Marshall worked as a staff writer and columnist for the Virginian-Pilot, where he came to focus on State and local politics and urban development. In 1998 and '99, Marshall wrote a bi-weekly opinion column as a correspondent for the Virginian-Pilot.

Marshall left the paper in 1999 for a Loeb Fellowship at the Harvard Graduate School of Design, in Cambridge, Massachusetts. He moved to New York City shortly thereafter, where he continued his freelance journalism.

== Markets and democracy ==
=== Controversy over New Urbanism ===
In the 1990s, Marshall became involved in controversy over his criticism of New Urbanism, a school of suburban design he called a marketing scheme to repackage conventional suburban sprawl behind nostalgic imagery and aspirational sloganism.

In a 1995 article in Metropolis magazine, Marshall denounced New Urbanism as "a grand fraud". Marshall continued the theme in numerous articles, including an opinion column in the Washington Post in September of the same year, and in Marshall's first book, How Cities Work: Suburbs, Sprawl, and the Roads Not Taken (Austin: University of Texas Press, 2000).

Andrés Duany, the architect whose Duany Plater Zyberk & Company is among the leading promoters of New Urbanism, and some of whose projects had come under Marshall's strongest criticism, dismissed Marshall's criticisms in an interview for the Daily Princetonian, saying that Marshall, ". . . cannot stand the fact that we're working with the middle class. He wants us to spend all our time with the poor."

New Urbanism advocate James Howard Kunstler gave Marshall negative reviews of How Cities Work, in Metropolis Magazine. Kunstler wrote,

As an analysis of the urban condition, the rest of How Cities Work is a patchwork of non sequiturs, platitudes, and tautologies. Its general theory is a one-dimensional preoccupation with transportation. As a discussion of particular places — Portland, Silicon Valley, Jackson Heights — it doesn't get beyond the self-evident. Along the way it takes cheap shots at the few figures on the contemporary scene who have tried to do something to alleviate the fiasco of the human habitat in our time.

He concluded

... I simply cannot find a consistent or coherent point of view in Marshall's long essay on the question, or at the very least an explanation of how cities work. What's missing is a recognition that the way cities have worked in America for the last half of the twentieth century was a gross aberration from the norms of human ecology that any civilization with a desire to endure would do well to avert.

Architectural Record called How Cities Work an "important new work," saying

In many ways, this book is the 21st-century analogue to one of the most important planning books of the past century, Benton MacKaye's 1928 landmark, The New Exploration. Like MacKaye's book, which shaped the thinking of generations of regional planners in the 20th century, How Cities Work could become a touchstone for coming generations interested in comprehending and redirecting metropolitan growth.

== Books ==
- The Surprising Design of Market Economies (University of Texas Press, 2012), ISBN 978-0-292-71777-0
- Beneath The Metropolis: the Secret Lives of Cities (Carroll and Graf, 2006), ISBN 978-0-786-71864-1
- How Cities Work: Suburbs, Sprawl and The Roads Not Taken (University of Texas Press, 2001), ISBN 978-0-292-75240-5
