= Peter Marshall (footballer, born 1942) =

Australian rules footballer

Personal information
- Full name: Peter Marshall
- Born: 31 December 1942
- Original team: Dandenong
- Height: 182 cm (6 ft 0 in)
- Weight: 75 kg (165 lb)

Playing career^{1}
Years	Club	Games (Goals)
1961–65	Collingwood	23 (3)
- ^{1} Playing statistics correct to the end of 1965.

Peter Marshall (born 31 December 1942) is a former Australian rules footballer who played with Collingwood in the Victorian Football League (VFL).

Marshall's disgraced grandson James Parsons formerly played for Australian Football League (AFL) club Geelong.

== Sources ==
- Holmesby, R. & Main, J. (2014) The Encyclopedia of AFL Footballers: every AFL/VFL player since 1897 (10th ed.), BAS Publishing: Seaford, Victoria. ISBN 978-1-921496-32-5.
