= Ru Marshall =

American writer, artist and critic

- Born: Eugene, Oregon
- Education: Wesleyan University
- Occupations: Artist, writer, critic
- Website: www.rmarshallstudio.com

Ru Marshall is an American writer, artist and critic.

As a visual artist, they have exhibited widely in Europe and the United States. Marshall's first novel, A Separate Reality, was published in 2006 by Carrol & Graf and was nominated for a Lambda Literary Award for Debut Fiction. American Trickster, their long awaited biography of Carlos Castaneda, was released by OR Books on June 23, 2026.

Marshall was born in Eugene, Oregon to the journalists Maxine and Jonathan Marshall, and was named after his great-uncle, the wilderness activist Robert Marshall. They grew up in Phoenix, Arizona and now live in New York City.

== Writing ==
Ru Marshall earned a BA in 1982 from Wesleyan University in Middletown, Connecticut. They also attended the Rhode Island School of Design. They were a member of the activist group ACT UP in the 1990s.

Set in Phoenix in the early seventies, Marshall's first novel, A Separate Reality, is at once a gender-non conforming coming of age tale and the story of a New Age crisis of faith.

The novel was well received and reviewed by The Washington Post, The Literary Review, The Orlando Sentinel, The Phoenix New Times, Bay Windows, the Lambda Book Report, and by writers such as Robert Gluck (Jack the Modernist), Lynne Tillman (No Lease on Life), Christopher Bram (Gods and Monsters), and others. Debra Liese, from the Literary Review, wrote:

This quietly intelligent debut novel about one lonely, creative adolescent's search for identity amid the indignities of middle-school life is precisely what most literary novels I've read this year are not: as deeply sincere as it is ironic ... Like Holden Caufield and adolescent narrators everywhere, Mark is painfully aware of falsity, but in Marshall's hands, this awareness is elevated to the level of a philosophical inquiry.

Wayne Koestenbaum, author of The Queen's Throat, wrote:

A beautifully understated and evocative rendering of what it feels like to grow up as a 'misfit' ... Robert Marshall's closeups of youthful sadness and elation, like Truffaut's or Bresson's or Solondz's, have a bitter, alienated clarity.

Their fiction, poetry, and nonfiction have appeared in Salon, N + 1 online, Evergreen Review, Another Chicago Magazine, The Michigan Quarterly Review, Diverse Voices Quarterly, Event, Blue Lake Review, Ducts, Stickman Review, Public Books, Alembic, Crack the Spine, Blithe House Quarterly, Foliate Oak, and numerous other publications including the anthologies Queer 13 and Afterwords. In 2007, their investigative feature, The Dark Legacy of Carlos Castaneda, revealed the story of the secretive cult started by the controversial anthropologist, and told the story of the five women who disappeared following his death in 1998. It was chosen for Best of Salon 2007.

Soon after, Marshall began work on a comprehensive biography of Castaneda. Their pursuit of this story led to a confrontation with law enforcement officials in Death Valley in 2014. In 2016, the Biographers International Organization awarded Marshall the Hazel Rowley Prize for this biography-in- progress. Marshall coproduced the first two season of the podcast Trickster, which is based on their forthcoming biography.

Their criticism has appeared in Artnet, PAJ, the Lambda Literary Review, and Public Books.

In 2017, Marshall organized Writers Resist Trump, a large-scale lobbying effort and demonstration that accompanied the AWP (Association of Writers and Writing Programs) Conference in Washington D.C. Marshall told Publishers Weekly: "I looked and didn't see anything about people going to congress, and I thought that was a little weird." They then began talking to like-minded friends and started a Facebook group to plan and gather participants.

On their review of American Trickster, Marshall's biography on Carlos Castaneda, Publishers Weekly wrote "Anthropologist–turned–New Age celebrity author Carlos Castaneda was a fraud and a cult leader, but also a powerful writer who tilled psychologically fertile material, according to this entrancing biography. Novelist Marshall … paints Castaneda as a charismatic liar—he fibbed about his age, name, upbringing, military service, and marriage—who, as a writer, turned mystical abstractions into arresting stories and imagery, including, Marshall perceptively argues, oblique references to his own tortured longing to erase his personal history….Marshall combines a colorful account of Castaneda’s sly triumphs with shrewd analysis of the toxic psychodramas by which he overawed his followers….In the portrait that emerges, Castaneda appears as captivating as Don Juan himself—a principal architect, for all his chicanery, of modern pop spirituality. This enthralls."

== Art career ==
Marshall began to exhibit in New York City in the early '90s. Since then their work has appeared at such venues as the Baxter Street Gallery, Richard Anderson Fine Arts, The Thread Waxing Space, Art in General, White Columns, Derek Eller Gallery, Triple Candie, Bronwyn Keenan Gallery, Steffany Martz Gallery, The Drawing Center, Dooley Le Cappellaine Gallery, Amy Lipton Gallery, Berland/Hall Gallery, Peter Kilchmann Galerie (Zurich), Centro Cultural Ricardo Rojas (Buenos Aires), 2B Gallery (Budapest), Gallery 32 (London), the New Orleans Contemporary Arts Center, The Other Side Gallery (Memphis), Art and Idea (Mexico City), Wessel O'Connor Gallery, and the John Tevis Project Space. They have also participated in panels at venues such as Dillon and Lee Gallery, Studio 10, and have also been a guest at Yaddo.

They are a recipient of fellowships from the MacDowell Colony, the Corporation of Yaddo, the Virginia Center for the Performing Arts, the Ragdale Foundation, the Banff Centre and the New York Foundation for the Arts. From 2002 to 2005, Marshall served as director of Prose in General, a reading series at Art in General focusing on the intersection of fiction and the visual arts. In 2004, they started teaching at the International Center of Photography in New York City. They are currently the director of the Pretext Reading Series at Studio 10 Gallery in Brooklyn, where their exhibition "Passing Through" opened in November, 2017. In his review for Hyperallergic, Stephen Maine said "Commonplace yet unsettling, Robert Marshall's dreamlike images are derived from fleeting, fragmentary glimpses of the passing land- and cityscape, seen through the window of a moving car or train. The territory is not as familiar as it sounds. Marshall's contribution to on-the-road photography is unique, and transcends both the genre and the medium."

== Prose and poetry on the web ==
- Life stories
- Prussian blue
- Limbo
- The Candy
- Breaking News
- AWP
- A Florida Boy
- My Bad
- Passages and Objectivity in Brooklyn
- Matt
- Topic: Death by Antonio dal Masetto (translation)
- The Dark Legacy of Carlos Castaneda
