= John Marshall (MP for Totnes) =

English politician

John Marshall (fl. 1395) was an English politician.

He was a member (MP) of the parliament of England for Totnes in 1395.
