= John Marshall Law School =

John Marshall Law School may refer to:

- Atlanta's John Marshall Law School in Atlanta, Georgia
- Cleveland-Marshall College of Law in Cleveland, Ohio, now known as Cleveland State University College of Law
- John Marshall Law School in Newark, New Jersey, now known as Seton Hall University School of Law
- Marshall-Wythe School of Law in Williamsburg, Virginia, now known as William & Mary Law School
- UIC John Marshall Law School in Chicago, Illinois, now known as University of Illinois Chicago School of Law
