= Lenore Marshall =

American poet (1899–1971)

- Born: Lenore Guinzburg; September 7, 1899; New York City, U.S.
- Died: September 23, 1971 (aged 72); Doylestown, Pennsylvania, U.S.
- Education: Barnard College
- Occupations: Poet; novelist; activist
- Spouse: James Marshall
- Children: 2, including Jonathan
- Parent(s): Harry Guinzburg; Leonie Kleinert

Lenore Guinzburg Marshall (September 7, 1899, New York City – September 23, 1971, Doylestown, Pennsylvania) was an American poet, novelist, and activist.

== Life ==
She was the daughter of Harry and Leonie (Kleinert) Guinzburg. She graduated from Barnard College in 1919.

She married James Marshall, son of New York lawyer Louis Marshall. Lenore and James had two children, Ellen and Jonathan; they lived in New York City.

From 1929 to 1932, Lenore Marshall worked as an editor at Cape and Smith, where she was instrumental getting them to publish The Sound and the Fury by William Faulkner. She also edited As I Lay Dying.

Her work appeared in Harper's, and The New Yorker.

Her son Jonathan Marshall owned and published the Scottsdale Daily Progress newspaper. Jonathan ran unsuccessfully for United States Senate against Barry Goldwater in 1974.

== Activism ==
In 1933, she became the treasurer of the Writers' League Against Lynching. She corresponded with Theodore Dreiser, who was a member, and who wrote the anti-lynching story "Nigger Jeff".

In 1956, with Norman Cousins, she helped found SANE, the National Committee for a Sane Nuclear Policy. She continued her anti-nuclear work with the Committee for Nuclear Responsibility. She corresponded with Irving Howe.

I am not embattled. I'm battling, and that makes life so much more interesting.

She lived at the Dorset Hotel, and in New Hope, Pennsylvania. In 1971, she was on the board of PEN.

== Lenore Marshall Poetry Prize ==
The Lenore Marshall Poetry Prize is given each year by the Academy of American Poets. The Prize was created in 1975 by the New Hope Foundation of Pennsylvania, which, until 1987, was a philanthropic foundation created by Lenore Marshall and her husband, James Marshall, to "support the arts and the cause of world peace"; Lenore Marshall, a poet, novelist, editor, and peace activist, had died in 1971.

== Awards ==
- MacDowell Colony Fellow

== Works ==
=== Poetry ===
- No Boundary. H. Holt. 1943.
- Other Knowledge: Poems New and Selected. Noonday Press. 1956.
- Marshall, Lenore (2002) [1969]. Latest Will: New and Selected Poems. W. W. Norton & Company. ISBN 978-0-393-32408-2.

=== Fiction ===
- Only the Fear. Macmillan. 1935.
- Hall of Mirrors. Macmillan. 1937.
- The Hill Is Level. Random House. 1959.
- The Confrontation, and Other Stories. Norton. 1972. ISBN 978-0-393-08448-1.

=== Memoir ===
- Janice Farrar Thaddeus, ed. (1979). Invented a Person: The Personal Record of a Life. Horizon Press. ISBN 978-0-8180-0231-1.

=== Non-fiction ===
- "William Faulkner: Man and Writer -- A Special Section". Saturday Review. XLV (29). New York. July 28, 1962.
- Daniela Gioseffi, ed. (2003). "Political Activism and Art". Women on war. Feminist Press. pp. 232–233. ISBN 978-1-55861-409-3.

=== Anthologies ===
- Where is Vietnam? American Poets Respond: an Anthology of Contemporary Poems. Anchor Books. 1967.

== Reviews ==
On The Hill is Level: "It is a novel of philosophical ideas and of literary culture, of moral idealism and social criticism. The central theme is a woman's struggle to emancipate herself and lead a good life."

"Her prose is freshest when it is specific, describing a union organizer with great affection or an advocate of nuclear weapons with unusual cruelty. There are passages about her children written with wide-open eyes and a generous heart. When she deals more generally with Literature or Politics or Life, she sometimes gets fuzzy or even affected."
