= Frank Marshall =

Frank Marshall may refer to:

- Frank Marshall, Baron Marshall of Leeds (1915–1990), British lawyer and politician
- Frank Marshall (chess player) (1877–1944), American chess master
- Frank Marshall (filmmaker) (born 1946), American film producer and director
- Frank Marshall (footballer, born 1904) (1904–1928), Scottish association football player
- Frank Marshall (footballer, born 1929) (1929–2015), English association football player and coach
- Frank Marshall Jiménez (1924–1994), Costa Rican engineer, soldier and politician
- Frank Marshall (photographer) (born 1985), South African photographer
- Frank Marshall (pianist) (1883–1959), Spanish pianist and pedagogue
- Frank Marshall (priest) (1946–2017), Dean of Barbados
- Frank Marshall (puppeteer) (1900–1969), American puppet maker
- Frank Marshall (referee) (1845–1906), British schoolmaster, cleric and rugby administrator
- Frank Marshall (umpire) (1858–?), American professional baseball umpire

== See also ==
- Francis Marshall (disambiguation)
