= Anthony Marshall =

Anthony or Tony Marshall may refer to:

- Anthony Marshall (American football) (born 1970), former American football cornerback
- Anthony Marshall (cricketer) (1932–1988), English cricketer
- Anthony Dryden Marshall (1924–2014), American producer
- Anthony Marshall (basketball) (born 1991), American basketball player
- Anthony W. Marshall (1906–1999), American television producer
- Tony Marshall (singer) (1938–2023), German Schlager singer
- Tony Marshall (actor) (born 1964), English actor

== See also ==
- Anthony Martial (born 1995), French footballer
- Tonie Marshall (1951–2020), French-American actress, screenwriter, and film director
