= Alex M. Loeb =

American painter (1918–2015)

- Born: May 18, 1918; Meridian, Mississippi, U.S.
- Died: May 14, 2015 (aged 96); Meridian, Mississippi, U.S.
- Resting place: Beth Israel Cemetery, Meridian, Mississippi, U.S.
- Known for: Painting

Alex M. Loeb (Mississippi, U.S., May 18, 1918 – May 14, 2015) was an American painter from the state of Mississippi.

== Life ==
Loeb was born on May 18, 1918, in Meridian, Mississippi. His father owned the Loeb's department store. Loeb graduated from Washington and Lee University in 1937, and he served in the United States Navy during World War II.

Loeb initially worked for his family business. He became a painter, and he worked in oils, acrylics, and pastels in a spontaneous, exuberant style. He described his technique: "I put a few bits of structure on chance and a little order on chaos." In 1995 Loeb had a retrospective exhibit at the Lauren Rogers Museum of Art entitled Old Men Shall Dream Dreams. He served on the boards of the Meridian Museum of Art and the Lauren Rogers Museum.

Loeb married Jean Robinson; they had two daughters. He died on May 14, 2015, in Meridian, and he was buried in Beth Israel Cemetery.

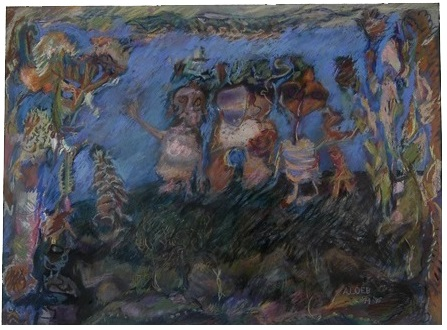
Alex M. Loeb, Reality is relative, 1994–1995
