= John R. Marshall =

John R. Marshall, M.D., helped orchestrate the world's first embryonic transfer.

== Education ==
Marshall attended Pomona College and received his M.D. degree from the University of Pennsylvania. He has completed advanced study in pharmacology at the University of Pennsylvania and in the executive MBA program at the Anderson School at UCLA.

== Career ==
Currently, Marshall is clinical professor of obstetrics and gynecology at the David Geffen School of Medicine at UCLA, adjunct professor at the Mercer University School of Medicine in Savannah, and adjunct professor of Public Health at Georgia Southern University. For 17 years he served as professor of obstetrics and gynecology at UCLA, vice chairman of the Department of Obstetrics and Gynecology at UCLA, and chairman of the Department of Obstetrics and Gynecology and residency program director of the Obstetrics and Gynecology Residency Program at the Harbor/UCLA Medical Center. Marshall, along with John Buster, was one of the developers of the technique that resulted in the first successful transfer of a conceptus from the uterus of a donor to the uterus of a recipient with a resulting live birth. He has been a principal in three start-up medical companies and has been involved in medical and pharmaceutical marketing for over 20 years. He currently serves as a medical advisor to Counsyl. He is the author of over 100 scientific publications and has served as an examiner for the American Board of Obstetrics and Gynecology, as chairman of the Obstetrics and Gynecology Test Committee of the National Board of Medical Examiners, and on the editorial board of Obstetrics and Gynecology.
