= Geoffrey Marshall =

Geoffrey Marshall may refer to:

- Geoffrey Marshall (constitutionalist) (1929–2003), British constitutional theorist
- Sir Geoffrey Marshall (physician) (1887–1982), British president of the Royal Society of Medicine
- Geoffrey Marshall (priest) (born 1948), Anglican priest and former dean of Brecon Cathedral
- Geoff Marshall, video producer, performer and author
