= Pam Solo =

Pam Solo (born 1946) is an arms control analyst, and Founder and President of the Civil Society Institute.

== Life ==
She co-founded the Rocky Flats campaign. In 1978 she was co-director the national Nuclear Weapons Facilities Task Force. She was one of the founders and leaders of the national Nuclear Weapons Freeze Campaign. She signed a letter in support of eight Czechoslovak protestors who were arrested in 1989.

She was the campaign director for Pat Schroeder and managed Schroeder's Presidential exploratory campaign. She worked for the Armed Services Committee staff.

She was active in the Nuclear Weapons Freeze movement, and helped to found Freeze Voter. In 1992, she founded the Civil Society Institute.

== Awards ==
- 1989 MacArthur Fellows Program

== Works ==
- From Protest to Policy: Beyond the Freeze to Common Security, Ballinger, 1988, ISBN 978-0-88730-112-4
- The Promise and Politics of Stem Cell Research, Authors Pam Solo, Gail Pressberg, Greenwood Publishing Group, 2007, ISBN 978-0-275-99038-1
- "A Nation of Learners", Letters to the next president: what we can do about the real crisis in public education, Editor Carl D. Glickman, Teachers College Press, 2004, ISBN 978-0-8077-4427-7
- "Beyond Theory: Civil Society in Action", Community Works: The Revival of Civil Society in America, Editor E. J. Dionne, Brookings Institution Press, 2000, ISBN 978-0-8157-1867-3
