= Walter Marshall =

Walter Marshall or Walter Marshal may refer to:

- Walter Marshal, 5th Earl of Pembroke (1199–1245)
- Walter Marshall, Baron Marshall of Goring (1932–1996), theoretical physicist
- Walter Marshall (Puritan) (1628–1680), English, non-conformist Puritan pastor and author
- Walter Marshall (cricketer) (1853–1943), English cricketer
- Walter V. Marshall (1890–1967), American architect and university administrator
