= David Marshall (tennis coach) =

American tennis coach, player, & business owner (born 1966)

- Born: David Howell Marshall; June 8, 1966 (age 60); Milford, Delaware, U.S.
- Education: Washington College (BS); Wilmington University (MS, EdD)
- Occupation: Tennis coach
- Known for: Coach of the Bryan brothers and the team of Mike Bryan and Jack Sock
- Awards: USPTA Tim Gullikson Touring Coach of the Year (2019)
- Website: DaveMarshallTennis.com

David Howell Marshall (born June 8, 1966) is an American tennis coach and former player. He is the founder of the Dave Marshall Tennis & Fitness Center. Marshall has coached athletes on the ATP and WTA tours, including the Bryan brothers and the doubles team of Mike Bryan and Jack Sock during their 2018 Grand Slam titles.

== Education ==
Marshall graduated from Washington College in 1988 with a Bachelor of Science in History, later earning a masters degree and doctorate from Wilmington University.Lead Washington College to number one NCAA ranking and two final four finishes where Marshall was team captain and MVP 1987 and 1988. He won the Eldridge Ellison Award given to the senior graduating who has done the most for athletics at Washington College. He was a Beneficial Hodson Merit Scholar, a Gray Pickney Leadership Scholar, a member of Omicron Delta Kappa and Fraternity officer of Lambda Pi.

He received his Masters degree from Wilmington University where he received the Campbell Posnell Award given to the highest GPA graduating from the Masters' program. His GPA was 4.0. He followed his Masters with a Doctorate in Education from Wilmington University where he graduated with honors and a GPA of 3.85.

== Playing career ==
Marshall competed in collegiate tennis for Washington College, where he was a two times conference champion and became the first nationally ranked player in Washington College history. In post-collegiate competition, he won 12 Delaware Open titles. He has won 25 national doubles titles and held a No. 1 national ranking in several USTA age divisions. His record included 129 single wins against 19 losses, 125 doubles wins against 10 losses. He was a Middle Atlantic Conference All Century Team Selection.

In 2005, he was inducted into the Washington College Athletic Hall of Fame. In 2006, he was inducted into the Delaware Tennis Hall of Fame.

== Coaching career ==
=== Professional ===
Marshall coached Bob Bryan and Mike Bryan from 2011 until their retirement in 2020. During their 2025 induction into the International Tennis Hall of Fame, the brothers identified Marshall as a factor in their late career performance.

In 2018, Marshall was the traveling coach for Mike Bryan and Jack Sock when the duo won doubles titles at Wimbledon and the US Open.

On the WTA tour, Marshall coached Madison Brengle in 2021. Brengle's ranking rose from No. 92 to No. 58 during that season. Other ATP and WTA professionals Marshall currently coaches include Brengle, Édouard Roger-Vasselin, Giuliana Olmos, Gabriela Dabrowski, Benoît Paire, and Kaia Kanepi. Marshall has coached four doubles teams to World No. 1 on the ATP/WTA tours.

=== Collegiate ===
Marshall joined the coaching staff at Delaware State University (DSU) in 2010. In 2012, the DSU women's team won the MEAC North Conference regular season title. Marshall was named the DSU Coach of the Year for the 2011–2012 season.

== Business ventures ==
Marshall served as the tennis director at Sea Colony in Bethany Beach, Delaware, for 25 years. In 2009, he established and currently owns the Dave Marshall Tennis & Pickleball in Lewes, Delaware.

== Awards and recognition ==
- Washington College Athletic Hall of Fame (2005)
- Delaware Tennis Hall of Fame (2006)
- USPTA Tim Gullikson Touring Coach of the Year (2019)
