= John Marshall (rugby union) =

Scotland international rugby union and cricketer

- Born: John Campbell Marshall; 30 January 1929 Sheffield, England
- Died: 26 April 2012 (aged 83)
- School: Rugby School
- University: Oxford University

Rugby union career
- Position: Fullback
Amateur team(s)
| Years | Team | Apps | (Points) |
- London Scottish
International career
| Years | Team | Apps | (Points) |
| 1954 | Scotland | 5 | (0) |

John Marshall (30 January 1929 – 26 April 2012) was a Scotland international rugby union player. In his rugby career he played as a fullback. He was also a first-class cricketer.

== Rugby union career ==
=== Amateur career ===
Marshall played for London Scottish.

=== International career ===
He was capped for Scotland 5 times in 1954.

== First-class cricket ==
While studying at Brasenose College, Oxford he played first-class cricket for Oxford University, making his debut against Worcestershire at Oxford in 1951. He played first-class cricket for Oxford until 1953, making sixteen appearances. Marshall scored a total of 710 runs in his sixteen matches, at an average of 26.29 and a high score of 111. This score, which was his only first-class century, came against the Free Foresters in 1953. His brother, David, also played first-class cricket.

== Teaching career ==
A pupil at Rugby School, Marshall later became a Housemaster at the school, then Acting Head Master, then Head of the Junior Department.
