= Howard Marshall =

Howard Marshallmay refer to:

- Howard Marshall (broadcaster) (1900–1973), English sports broadcaster
- Howard Marshall (rugby union) (1870–1929), English rugby union player
- I. Howard Marshall (1934–2015), biblical scholar
- J. Howard Marshall (1905–1995), American oil business executive
- J. Howard Marshall III (born 1936), American businessman
- Howard Wight Marshall (born 1944), American academic, folklorist, historian, and fiddler
