= Jonathan Marshall (publisher) =

American editor (1924–2008)

Jonathan Marshall (January 20, 1924 – December 13, 2008) was an American newspaper publisher and philanthropist.

== Life ==
Jonathan was the son of New York City attorney James Marshall and poet Lenore Guinzberg Marshall. His grandfather Louis Marshall was a prominent lawyer and Jewish leader. Jonathan had one sister, Ellen Marshall Scholl.

Marshall was dyslexic, but earned a Bachelor of Science degree in economics and political science from the University of Colorado in 1946.

Marshall married Maxine Sue Besser of St Louis in April 1955. He earned a master's degree in journalism from the University of Oregon in 1962.

Jonathan and Maxine Marshall had four children: sons Jonathan H. and Robert, and daughters Lucinda and Laura.

Maxine Marshall died in 2015. She was 89.

== Publishing and writing ==
Marshall bought a bankrupt fine art magazine called Art Digest in 1953 in partnership with James N. Rosenberg. After changing the format and changing the name to ARTS, Marshall sold the magazine in 1958 to join the Ford Foundation's Humanities and Arts program. ARTS would later become Arts Magazine.

In 1963, Marshall purchased the Scottsdale Daily Progress newspaper, and published it for 24 years. He took a brief hiatus in 1974 to run unsuccessfully for the U.S. Senate against Barry Goldwater.

In 2003, Ruder-Finn Press published Marshall's novel Reunion in Norway. The novel was inspired by Marshall's visit to a museum in Bergen which documented the Norwegian resistance movement against the German occupation of Norway during World War II.

According to the University of Oregon School of Journalism and Communication, Marshall,

"...was twice nominated for a Pulitzer Prize; and was granted the Arizona Press Club's Distinguished Service Award, the Arizona Newspaper Association's Master Editor Publisher Award, and the Society of Professional Journalists National First Amendment Award. He served as president of the Arizona Newspaper Association and chairman of the National Newspaper Association's Freedom of Information Committee."

Marshall was inducted into the Arizona Newspapers Association Hall of Fame in 1996, the same year as Don Bolles and Charles E. Thornton. Induction was previously a posthumous honor; Marshall was among the first journalists to be inducted during his lifetime.

== Civic activities ==
Marshall was one of the founders of Temple Solel reform synagogue in Paradise Valley, Arizona.

After Marshall sold the Progress in 1987, he and Maxine founded The Marshall Fund of Arizona. The fund distributed over $5 million to cultural and charitable concerns.

== Autobiography ==
Marshall penned his autobiography, Dateline History, shortly before his death. it was published in 2009 by Acacia Publishing in Phoenix, Arizona.

== Impact ==
The Progress was one of the first newspapers in the country to oppose the Vietnam War. Marshall spoke out against the KKK, supported gun control, and was a frequent target of threats against his life.

Through the Progress, Marshall supported the creation of a greenbelt instead of concrete flood-control ditch, which the United States Army Corps of Engineers had planned for Scottsdale's Indian Bend Wash. The "Indian Bend Wash Greenbelt" exists today as "...an oasis of parks, lakes, paths and golf courses traversing 11 miles through the heart of Scottsdale."

The East Valley Tribune's Pulitzer Prize-winning Ryan Gabrielson wrote of Marshall,

"With the purchase of the Scottsdale Progress in 1963, Marshall brought a liberal editorial viewpoint that argued for open space, open public meetings and open records."

Inspired by a 1 a.m. vote of the Scottsdale, Arizona city council to approve a $500,000 garbage collection contract, Marshall drafted a new open meeting law for Arizona in 1962. It was revised by the attorney for the Progress, Bruce Babbitt (who would go on to be Arizona attorney general and governor of Arizona, and was appointed United States Secretary of the Interior). The revised version of the open meeting law bill was introduced by then-Arizona state senator and future United States Supreme Court Justice, Sandra Day O'Connor.

The bill was adopted into law. It is found in Arizona Revised Statutes §§ 38-431 through 38-431.09, and summarized on the Arizona Ombudsman's website.

Marshall said of his open meeting law efforts,

"It strengthened the open meetings law and made it effective, although almost every year some government official in Arizona still tried to get around the law."

Party political offices
Preceded by Roy Elson	Democratic nominee for U.S. Senator from Arizona (Class 3); 1974	Succeeded by William R. Schulz
