= John Marshall (classicist) =

British classical scholar (1845–1915)

John Marshall (9 March 1845 – 15 December 1915) was a British classicist and the rector of the Royal High School, Edinburgh, who published very widely used translations of several Greek and Roman classics, and a history of Greek philosophy. He received an M.A. from Oxford University and an honorary LL.D. from the University of Edinburgh.

He is the author of the book A Short History of Greek Philosophy which was published in 1891 in London by Percival and Co. and can be found in epub form According to WorldCat, the book is held in 625 libraries, and has been translated into Hebrew by Samuel Scolnicov as תולדות הפילוסופיה היוונית / Toldot ha-filosofyah ha-Yeṿanit It was reviewed by Wm. A. Hammond.in The Philosophical Review. vol. 1, no. 1: 109-111. (1892)

He translated Horace's Odes, books I-IV, Epodes and Saecular hymn, translated. by Dr. J. Marshall for the Everyman's Library edition of the Complete Works of Horace published in 1911 (this edition in its various version is in 1357 libraries according to WorldCat). He also translated Xenophon's Memorabilia and Anabasis,
