= Jack Marshall (disambiguation) =

Jack Marshall (1912–1988) was prime minister of New Zealand.

Jack Marshall may also refer to:

== Sports ==
- Jack Marshall (ice hockey) (1877–1965), Canadian ice hockey player
- Jack Marshall (pitcher) (1893–1961), American Negro leagues baseball pitcher
- Jack Marshall (second baseman) (1908–1990), American Negro league baseball player
- Jack Marshall (soccer) (1892–1964), American soccer player
- Jack Marshall (cricketer) (1916–2000), English cricketer
- Jack Marshall (footballer, born 1917) (1917–1998), English football manager
- Jack Marshall (footballer, born 1895) (1895–1968), English footballer
- Jack Marshall (rugby union) (1926–2013), represented Australia

== Others ==
- Jack Marshall (Canadian politician) (1919–2004)
- Jack Marshall (composer) (1921–1973), American guitarist, conductor, and composer
- Jack Marshall (author) (born 1936), American poet and author
- Jack Marshall, fictional protagonist of The Hacker Files, a DC Comics mini-series

== See also ==
- John Marshall (disambiguation)
