= Murray Murphey =

American historian and philosopher

Murray Griffin Murphey (February 22, 1928 – December 6, 2018) was an American historian and philosopher.

A native of Colorado Springs, Colorado born to Bradford and Margaret Murphey on February 22, 1928, Murray Murphey graduated from Harvard University and earned a doctorate from Yale University. He began teaching at the University of Pennsylvania as a Rockefeller Fellow shortly after completing his studies in 1954. Murphey joined the faculty as an assistant professor in 1956, and became a full professor in 1966. He retired in 2000. Over the course of his career, Murphy earned awards from the Society for the Advancement of American Philosophy and the American Studies Association. He also edited the journal American Quarterly. Murphey died at the age of 90 on December 6, 2018.
