= John Marshall (historian) =

British historian

- Education: Churchill College, Cambridge, Johns Hopkins University
- Occupation: historian
- Known for: Professor of History, Johns Hopkins University
- Notable work: two books on the English philosopher and political theorist John Locke
- Awards: Fellow, Royal Historical Society

John Marshall is a British historian. He was the Chairman of the Department of History at Johns Hopkins University, and is now Leonard and Helen R. Stulman Professor of History at the same institution.

== Life ==
He was awarded BA (1st Class Hons.) and an MA at Churchill College, Cambridge, as well as an MA and PhD from The Johns Hopkins University. He is a Fellow of the Royal Historical Society.

Marshall has written two books on the English philosopher and political theorist John Locke. Edward G. Andrew of the University of Toronto wrote that Marshall's John Locke: Resistance, Religion and Responsibility was "the most careful and comprehensive treatment of Locke's political theology I have read". Julian H. Franklin of Columbia University said that "the elaborate and extended account of Locke's positions on ecclesiology and theology is essentially the first complete study of Locke's thought in that domain and is unrivaled in the literature". Perez Zagorin claimed that Marshall's John Locke, Toleration and Early Enlightenment Culture "is not only an outstanding contribution to the history of religious toleration, but also offers the most comprehensive treatment of the subject in the late seventeenth and early eighteenth centuries, the early years of the Enlightenment, that now exists...a fine work of scholarship". Tim Harris wrote that the "book is surely destined to become a classic".

== Works ==
- John Locke: Resistance, Religion and Responsibility (Cambridge University Press, 1994).
- John Locke, Toleration and Early Enlightenment Culture (Cambridge University Press, 2006).
