= James Marshall =

James Marshall may refer to:

== Arts and entertainment ==
- James Duard Marshall (1914–2010), American painter
- James Marshall (author) (1942–1992), American author of children's books
- James Marshall (director) (born 1962), American television producer and director
- James Marshall (actor) (born 1967), American actor
- Dalek (artist) (born 1968), real name James Marshall, American artist
- James Marshall (producer) (active since 2013), British television producer

== Business and industry ==
- James W. Marshall (1810–1885), American businessman, discovered gold in California in 1848
- James Waddell Marshall (1845–1925), Scottish businessman in Australia
- James Thompson Marshall (1854–1931), English railway and mechanical engineer
- James G. Marshall (industrialist) (1869–1960), American industrialist and inventor

== Law and politics ==
- James Markham Marshall (1764–1848), United States federal judge
- James Garth Marshall (1802–1873), English politician, MP for Leeds
- James Keith Marshall (1817–1862), American planter and politician in Virginia
- James S. Marshall (1819–1892), American politician, mayor of Green Bay, Wisconsin
- Sir James Marshall (judge) (1829–1889), British colonial judge
- James Marshall (politician) (1843–1912), member of the New Zealand Legislative Council
- James William Marshall (politician) (1844–1911), US congressman from Virginia
- James G. Marshall (politician) (c. 1852–1891), American politician in Mississippi
- James Alexander Marshall (1888–1977), Canadian federal politician
- James Marshall (political adviser) (born 1980), British political advisor

== Military ==
- James K. Marshall (1839–1863), Confederate Army officer during the American Civil War
- James Marshall (VC) (1887–1918), British Army officer, Victoria Cross recipient
- James C. Marshall (1897–1977), American military engineer, first head of the Manhattan Engineer District

== Sports ==
- James Marshall (footballer, born 1890) (1890–1958), Scottish footballer (Bradford City)
- James Marshall (footballer, born 1908) (1908–1977), Scottish footballer (Rangers, Arsenal, national team)
- James Marshall (cricketer) (born 1979), New Zealand cricketer
- James Marshall (rugby union) (born 1988), New Zealand rugby player

== Others ==
- James Marshall (minister) (1796–1855), Scottish minister
- James William Marshall (1822–1910), US Postmaster General
- James H. Marshall (1931–2007), American administrator, president of Hofstra University

== See also ==
- James Marshall & Co., a department store in Adelaide, South Australia
- Jim Marshall (disambiguation)
