= Jim Marshall =

Jim Marshall may refer to:

== Politics ==
- Jim Marshall (Georgia politician) (born 1948), a member of the United States House of Representatives
- Jim E. Marshall (born 1960), a former member of the Pennsylvania House of Representatives
- Jim Marshall (British politician) (1941–2004), British politician
- Jim Marshall (New Hampshire politician), member of the New Hampshire House of Representatives

== Sports ==
- Jim Marshall (defensive end) (1937–2025), American football defensive lineman in the U.S. and Canada
- Jim Marshall (defensive back) (born 1952), American football defensive back in the U.S. and Canada
- Jim Marshall (coach), head college football coach for the University of Richmond Spiders (1989–1994)
- Jim Marshall (Australian footballer) (1882–1950), Australian rules footballer
- Jim Marshall (baseball) (1931–2025), American baseball player and manager

== Others ==
- Jim Marshall (businessman) (1923–2012), owner and founder of Marshall Amplification
- Jim Marshall (photographer) (1936–2010), music photographer
- Jim Marshall (academic) (1937–2021), New Zealand philosopher of education

== See also ==
- James Marshall (disambiguation)
