= Kalmia (disambiguation) =

Kalmia is a genus of evergreen shrubs.

It may also refer to some locations in the United States:

- Kalmia, Maryland
- Kalmia, South Carolina, now named Langley
- Kalmia Gardens, in Hartsville, South Carolina
- The Kalmia Hills, a mountain range in California
- The Kalmia Club, in Lambertville, New Jersey, listed on the NRHP
