= Lambertville House =

Historic house in New Jersey, United States

- U.S. National Register of Historic Places
- U.S. Historic district – Contributing property
- New Jersey Register of Historic Places
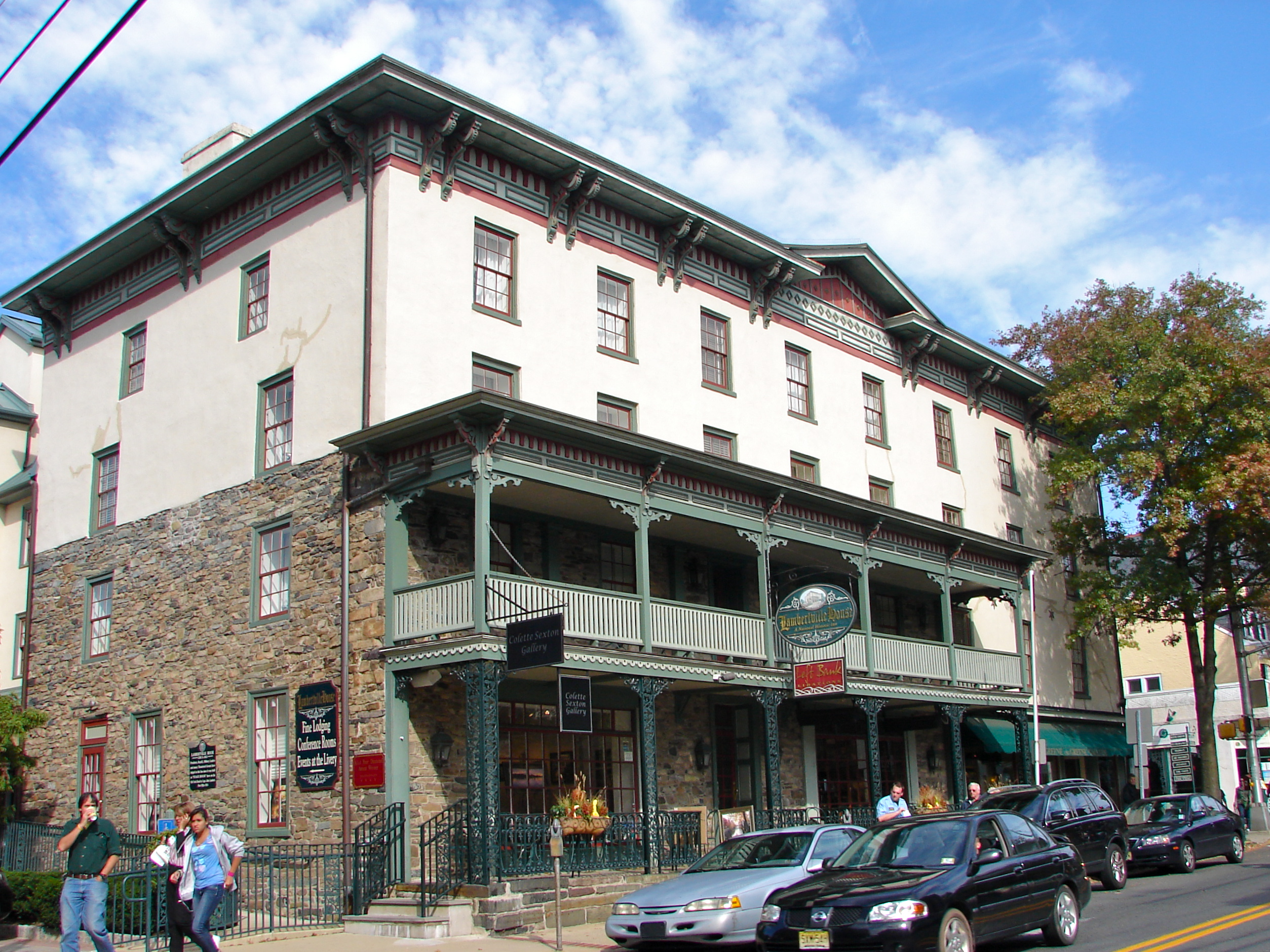

- Location within Hunterdon County, New Jersey Location within New Jersey Location within the United States
- Location: 32 Bridge Street, Lambertville, New Jersey
- Coordinates: 40°21′57″N 74°56′44″W
- Built: 1812
- Architectural style: Federal, Italianate
- Part of: Lambertville Historic District (ID83001602)
- NRHP reference No.: 78001768
- NJRHP No.: 1602

Significant dates
- Added to NRHP: September 6, 1978
- Designated CP: June 30, 1983
- Designated NJRHP: April 27, 1978

The Lambertville House is a historic building located at 32 Bridge Street in the city of Lambertville in Hunterdon County, New Jersey, United States. The stone section was built in 1812 by Captain John Lambert. It was added to the National Register of Historic Places on September 6, 1978, for its significance in architecture, commerce, and communications. It was listed as a contributing property of the Lambertville Historic District on June 30, 1983. Today, it is a hotel with restaurant and business meeting rooms.

== History and description ==
In 1812, Captain John Lambert (1777–1828), nephew of politician John Lambert (1746–1823), built the original three and one-half story fieldstone building for use as a tavern and inn. It featured vernacular Federal architecture. In 1814, his uncle, then a U. S. Senator, had a post office established in the building, had him appointed postmaster, and named the community Lambert's Ville. During the third quarter of the 19th century, it was expanded by the addition of a four-story masonry wing featuring Victorian Italianate architecture.

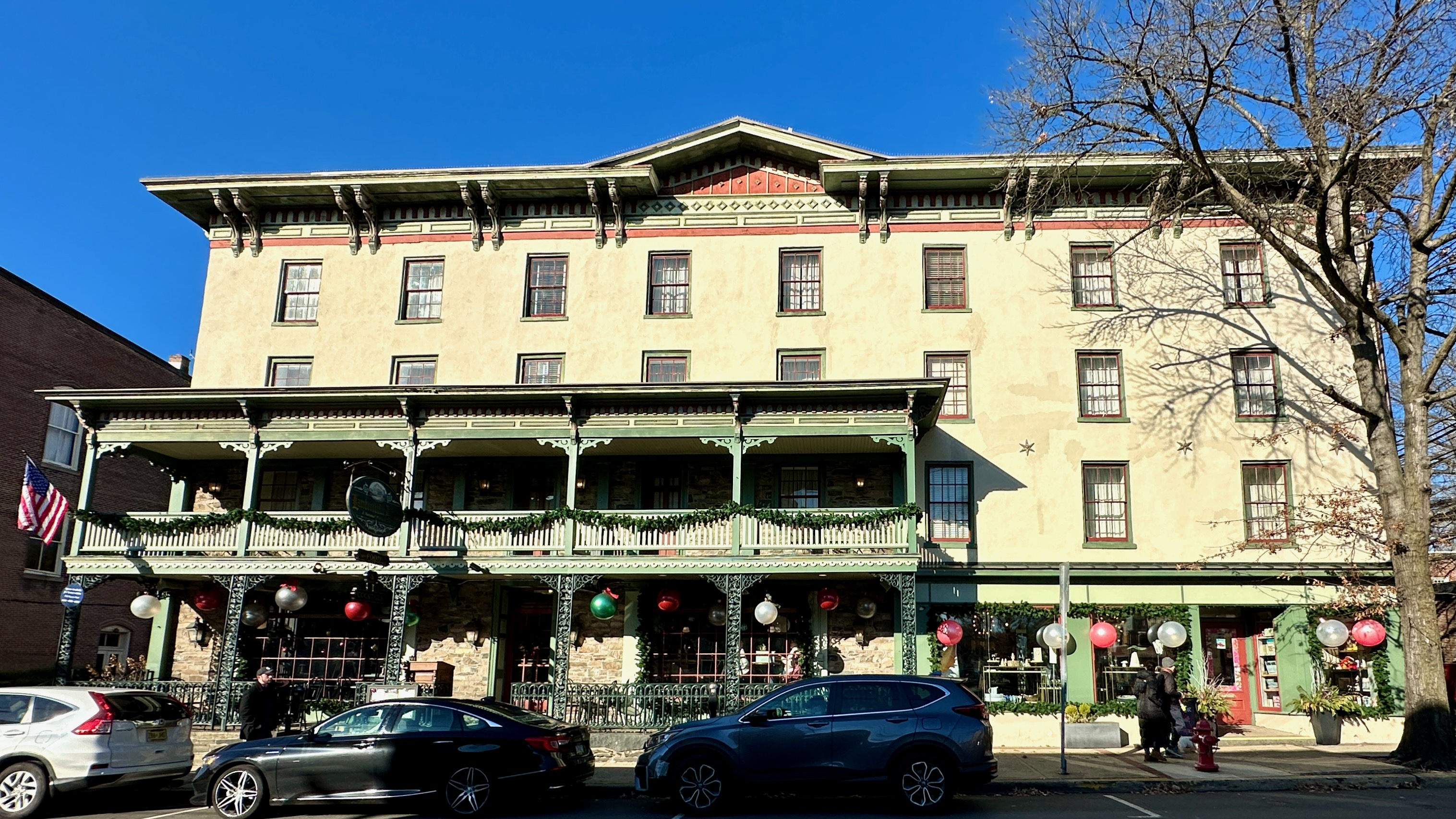
Lambertville House in 2024

== See also ==
- National Register of Historic Places listings in Hunterdon County, New Jersey
