= Kalmia Club =

United States women's club and historic place

- U.S. National Register of Historic Places
- U.S. Historic district – Contributing property
- New Jersey Register of Historic Places
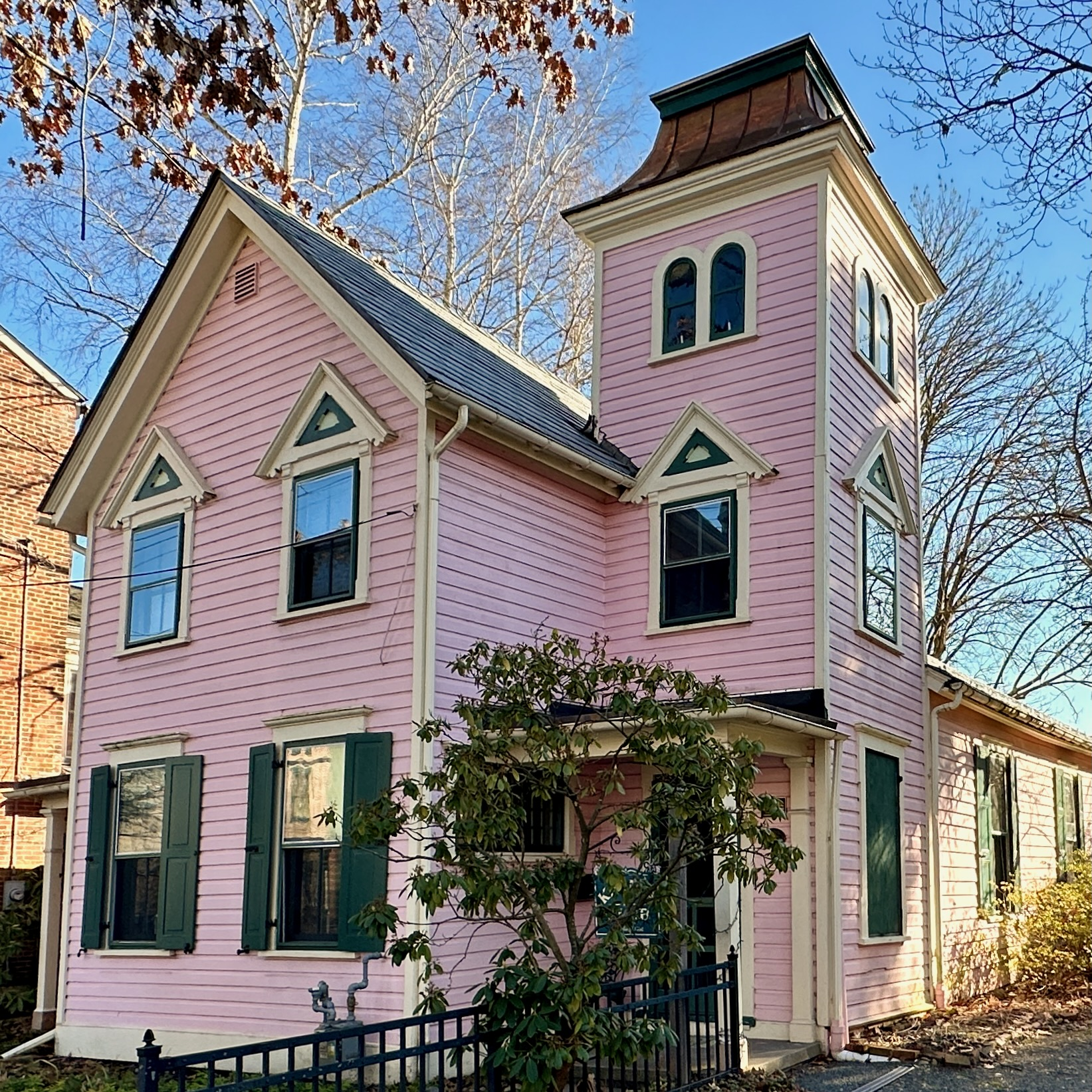
- Clubhouse of the Kalmia Club in 2024

- Location within Hunterdon County, New Jersey Location within New Jersey Location within the United States
- Location: 39 York Street, Lambertville, New Jersey
- Coordinates: 40°22′06″N 74°56′40″W
- Built: c. 1870
- Built by: Joseph Smith
- Architectural style: Vernacular Italianate
- Part of: Lambertville Historic District (ID83001602)
- MPS: Clubhouses of New Jersey Women's Clubs
- NRHP reference No.: 12000208
- NJRHP No.: 5134

Significant dates
- Added to NRHP: April 16, 2012
- Designated CP: June 30, 1983
- Designated NJRHP: January 4, 2012

The Kalmia Club is a women's club established in 1892 in the city of Lambertville in Hunterdon County, New Jersey, United States. It has used the house at 39 York Street as its clubhouse since 1893. The Italianate wood-frame house was built around 1870 and expanded in 1882. It was listed as a contributing property of the Lambertville Historic District on June 30, 1983. It was later added individually to the National Register of Historic Places on April 16, 2012, for its significance in education, entertainment, and social history. The Kalmia Club was listed as part of the Clubhouses of New Jersey Women's Clubs Multiple Property Submission (MPS).

== History ==
The club was established in 1892 by a group of local women and was first known as the Reading Circle. They discussed literature and cultural topics, led by their first president, Elie Erismann. In 1893, they started holding their meetings at 39 York Street and changed their name to the Kalmia Club, after the botanical name, Kalmia latifolia, of the mountain laurel. The club became a member of the New Jersey State Federation of Women's Clubs in 1897, and is also a member of the General Federation of Women's Clubs. In 1995, they published the Lambertville Community Cookbook to raise funds for their community service projects, including scholarships for local young women. In 1996, they started the annual Hidden Gardens of Lambertville tour to raise funds for community projects.

== Clubhouse ==
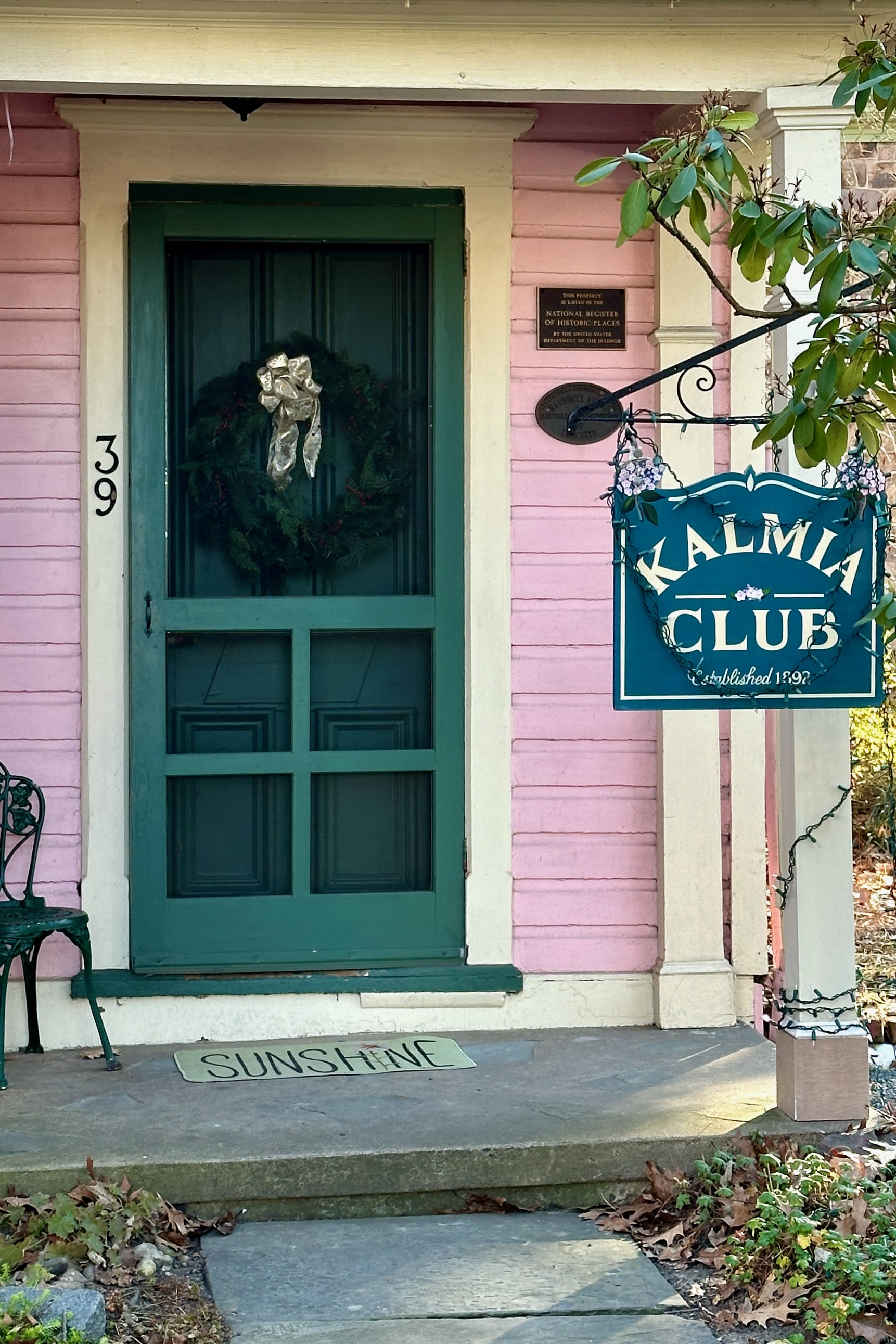
Kalmia Club entrance

The house was built by Joseph Smith and others around 1870 as a one-story frame schoolhouse, which became known as the Lambertville Seminary. It was enlarged in 1882 into a two-story Italianate house with a gable-fronted roof. There is a two-story tower with a hip roof on the east side and a three-story tower with a mansard roof on the west side. It then became a Society of Friends Meeting House, with the entrance on two-story tower used by the Quaker women, and the entrance on the three-story tower by the Quaker men. The Kalmia Club has used it for their meetings since 1893. According to the nomination form, this may be the first local women's clubhouse in the state. The Society of Friends deeded the building to the club in 1910. It is now painted in the club colors, pink and green. There is a large public meeting room on the first floor and a meeting room on the second floor.

== See also ==
- List of women's clubs
- National Register of Historic Places listings in Hunterdon County, New Jersey
