= Lambertville Historic District =

Historic district in New Jersey, United States

- U.S. National Register of Historic Places
- U.S. Historic district
- New Jersey Register of Historic Places
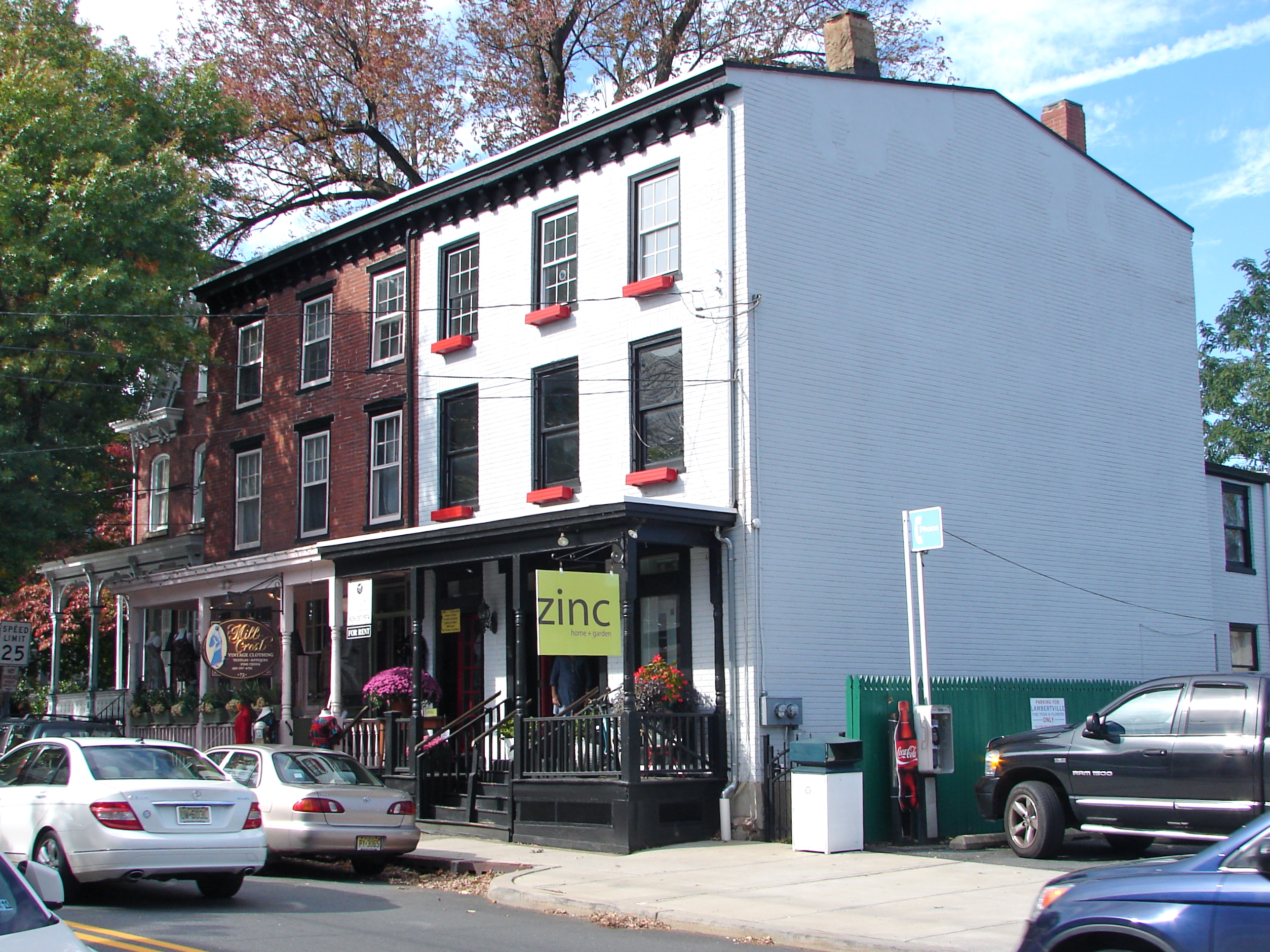

- Location within Hunterdon County, New Jersey Location within New Jersey Location within the United States
- Location: NJ 29 and NJ 179, Lambertville, New Jersey
- Coordinates: 40°21′58″N 74°56′34″W
- Area: 198 acres (80 ha)
- Built: 1812
- Architect: Multiple
- Architectural style: Late Victorian, Federal
- NRHP reference No.: 83001602
- NJRHP No.: 1601

Significant dates
- Added to NRHP: June 30, 1983
- Designated NJRHP: May 18, 1983

The Lambertville Historic District is a 198-acre (80 ha) historic district encompassing the community centered around the intersection of Route 29 and Route 179 in the city of Lambertville in Hunterdon County, New Jersey, United States. The district was added to the National Register of Historic Places on June 30, 1983, for its significance in architecture, commerce, industry, and settlement. It includes 680 contributing buildings, and two contributing structures.

== History ==
A wooden bridge was constructed across the Delaware River in 1812 to connect Lambertville with New Hope, Pennsylvania. Bridge street was laid out to meet with the bridge. Many of Lambertville's oldest structures are located along Bridge street. A tavern on Bridge street called the Lambertville House was built by Captain John Lambert in 1812. The James W. Marshall House also on Bridge street was built in 1816. The Delaware and Raritan Canal was constructed in 1830. The Belvidere Delaware Railroad was built along the canal in 1851. The Holcombe House was documented by the Historic American Buildings Survey (HABS) in 1937. General George Washington used it as his headquarters during the American Revolutionary War in July 1777 and later in June 1778. The stone house was built around 1756 by Richard Holcombe (1726–1783), the son of early settler John Holcombe (1682–1743). The Lambertville City Hall was built in 1870 by A. H. Holcombe and purchased by the city in 1950. The three-story stone house features Second Empire architecture with a concave mansard roof.

== Gallery of contributing properties ==
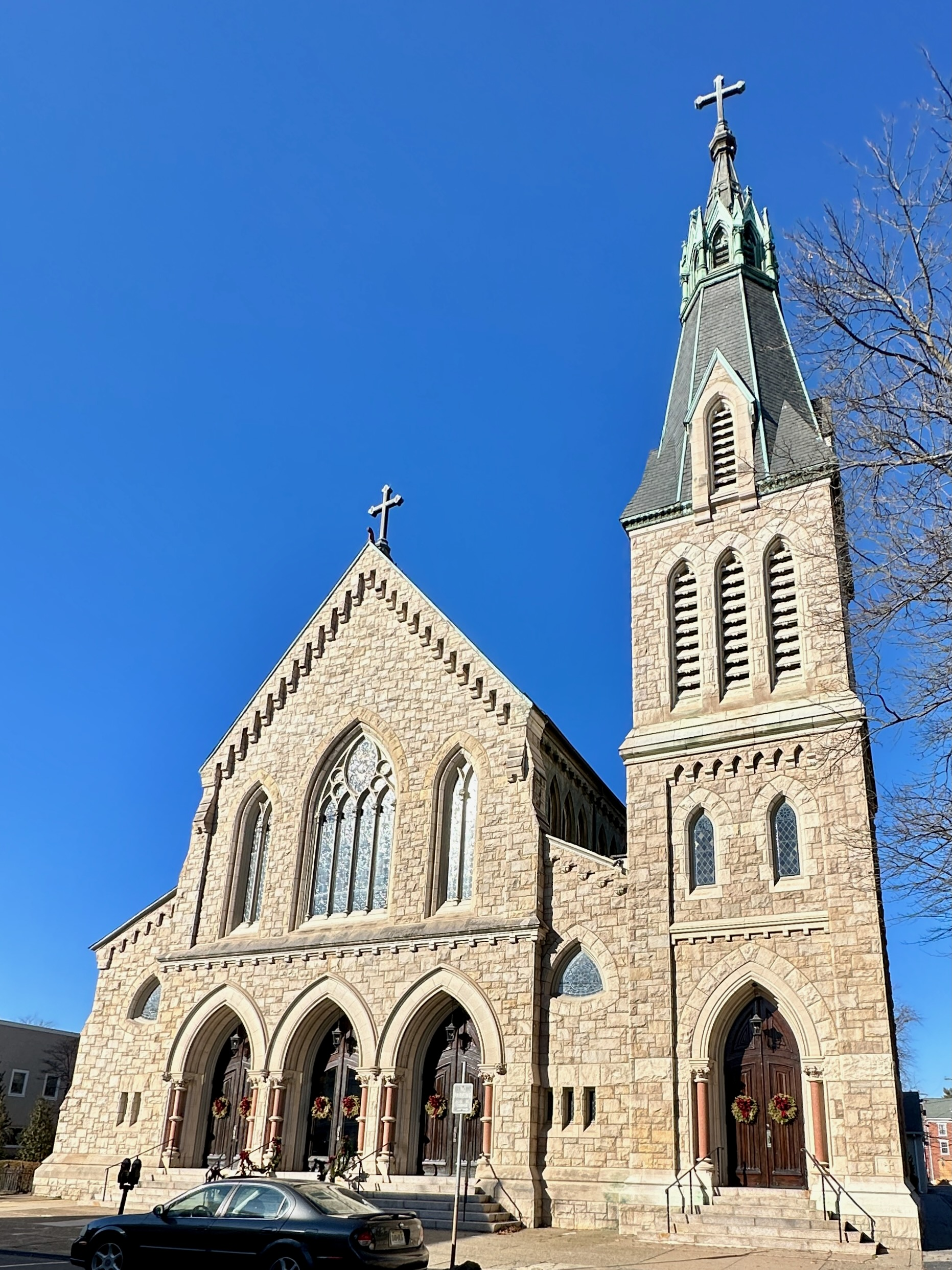
St. John the Evangelist Roman Catholic Church

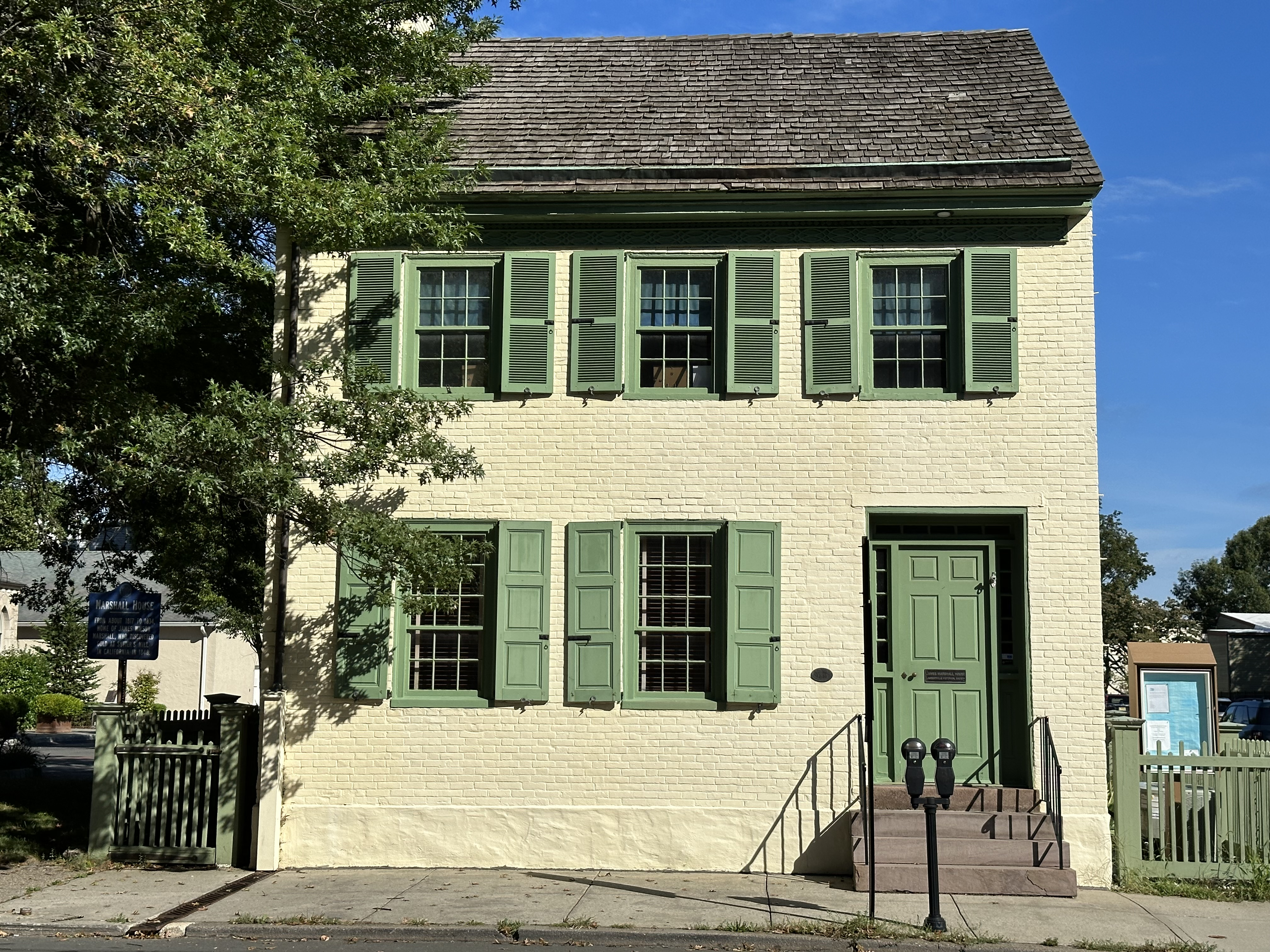
James W. Marshall House

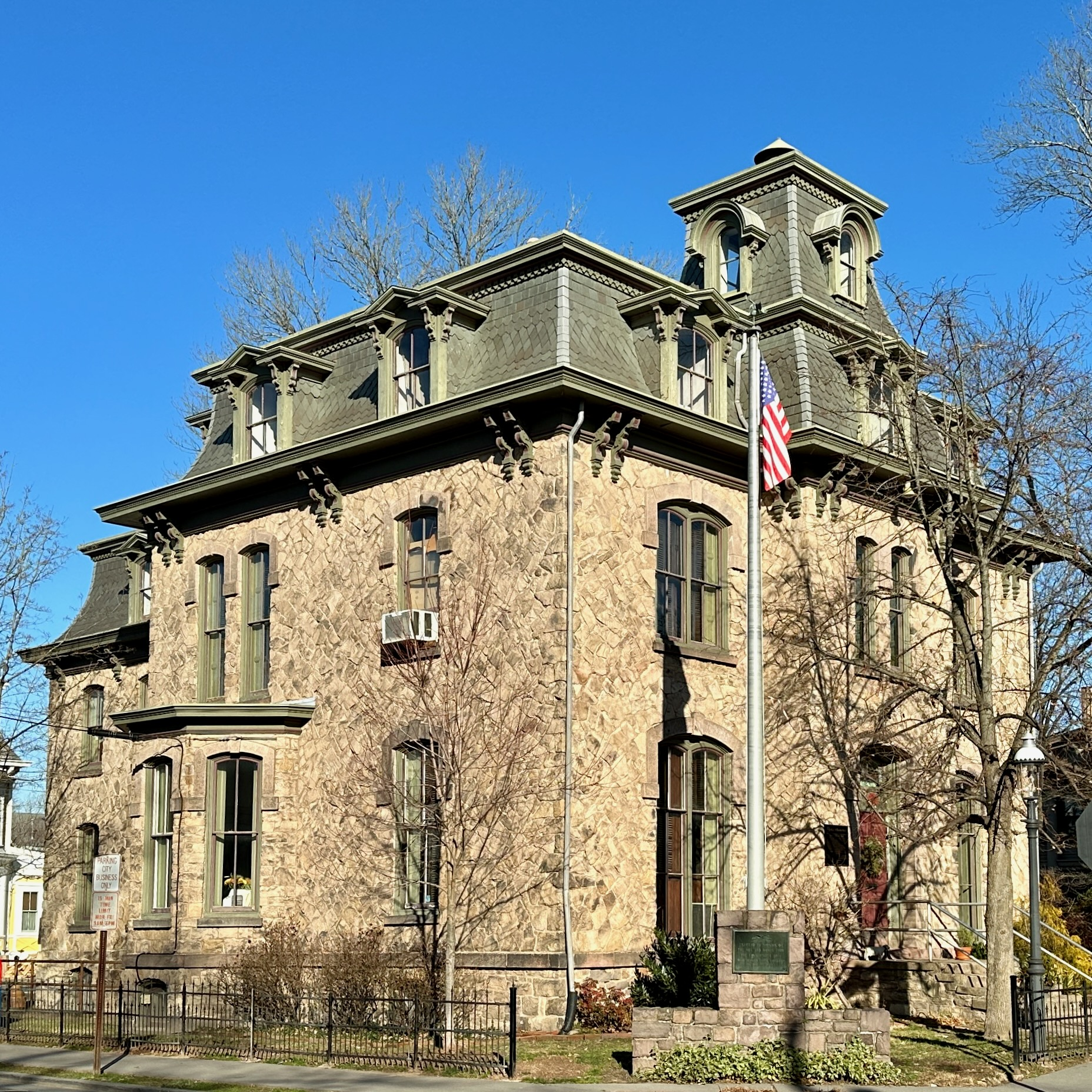
A. H. Holcombe House, Lambertville City Hall

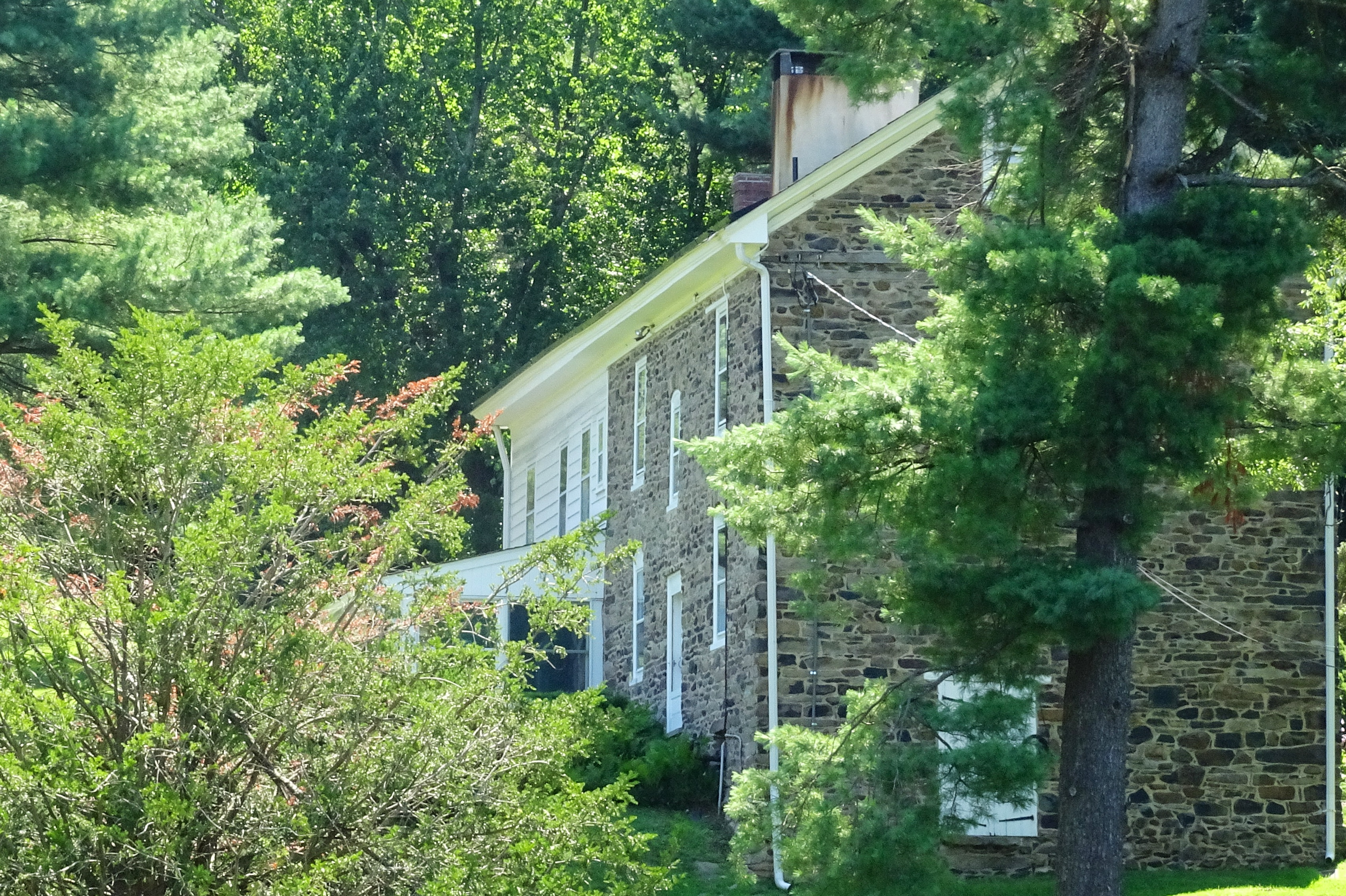
Holcombe House, Washington's headquarters

== See also ==
- List of Washington's Headquarters during the Revolutionary War
- National Register of Historic Places listings in Hunterdon County, New Jersey
