= Lambertville, New Jersey =

City in Hunterdon County, New Jersey, USA

- City
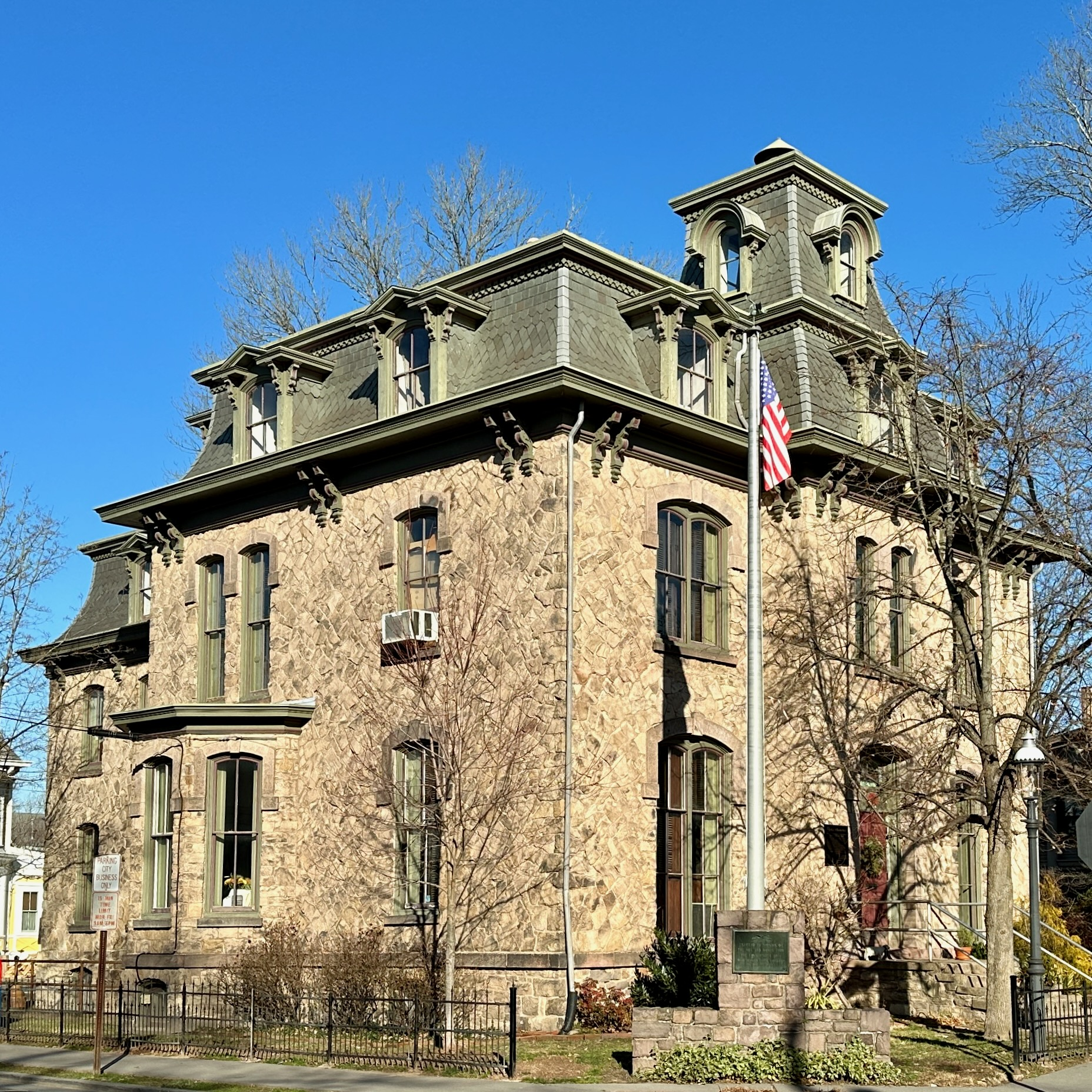
- Lambertville City Hall

- Seal

- Location of Lambertville in Hunterdon County highlighted in red (left). Inset map: Location of Hunterdon County in New Jersey highlighted in orange (right).

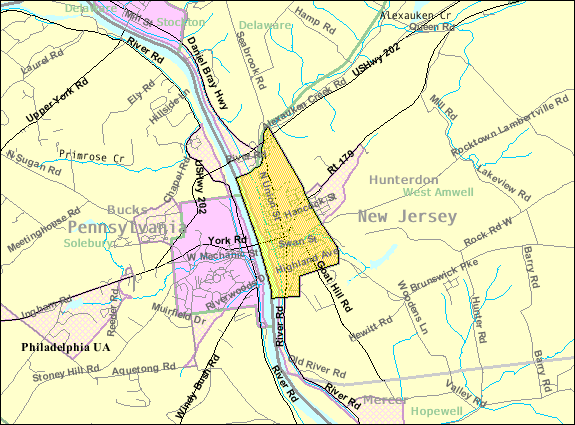
- Census Bureau map of Lambertville, New Jersey
- Interactive map of Lambertville, New Jersey
- Location in Hunterdon County Location in New Jersey Location in the United States
- Coordinates: 40.368563°N 74.943049°W
- Country: United States
- State: New Jersey
- County: Hunterdon
- Incorporated: March 1, 1849
- Named for: John Lambert

Government
  - Type: Faulkner Act (small municipality)
  - Body: City Council
  - Mayor: Andrew J. Nowick (D, term ends December 31, 2024)
  - Administrator: Vacant
  - Municipal clerk: Cynthia L. Ege

Area
  - Total: 1.22 sq mi (3.17 km^{2})
  - Land: 1.08 sq mi (2.81 km^{2})
  - Water: 0.14 sq mi (0.36 km^{2}) 11.46%
  - Rank: 482nd of 565 in state 21st of 26 in county
- Elevation: 82 ft (25 m)

Population (2020)
  - Total: 4,139
  - Estimate (2023): 4,157
  - Rank: 410th of 565 in state 11th of 26 in county
  - Density: 3,817.3/sq mi (1,473.9/km^{2})
  - Rank: 170th of 565 in state 2nd of 26 in county
- Time zone: UTC−05:00 (Eastern (EST))
  - Summer (DST): UTC−04:00 (Eastern (EDT))
- ZIP Code: 08530
- Area code: 609 exchanges: 397, 773
- FIPS code: 3401938610
- GNIS feature ID: 0885271
- Website: www.lambertvillenj.org

Lambertville is a city within Hunterdon County in the U.S. state of New Jersey. It is situated on the banks of the Delaware River in southwestern Hunterdon County, directly across the river from New Hope, Pennsylvania.

In the 18th century, the area was named after various operators of ferries across the river to Pennsylvania, ultimately becoming known as Coryell's Ferry, after its owner, Emanuel Coryell. Coryell's Ferry was the western terminus of the New Jersey portion of York Road, which became U.S. Route 202, connecting New York City and Philadelphia. The community was named Lambertville in 1810, when the post office was established, in honor of John Lambert, a resident who had served as United States senator and acting governor of New Jersey, and who was responsible for the opening of the post office. In June 2022, The New York Times described Lambertville as a gay-friendly travel destination with a quieter vibe than New York's Fire Island.

As of the 2020 United States census, the city's population was 4,139, an increase of 233 (+6.0%) from the 3,906 recorded at the 2010 census, which in turn reflected an increase of 38 (1.0%) from the 3,868 counted in the 2000 census.

== History ==
Originally settled by the Lenape (Delaware) Native Americans, a 150,000-acre (230 sq mi; 610 km^{2}) area around Lambertville was acquired for 700 Pounds by the Council of West Jersey and divided into smaller plots. The earliest European settler in present-day Lambertville was John Holcombe, who purchased a lot and built a stone home in 1744.

Emanuel Coryell bought a property in the area in 1732, which was used for commercial purposes. He received a charter to operate a ferry connecting what is now Lambertville and New Hope, and opened a tavern and inn to host travelers stopping halfway along the route between New York City and Philadelphia. The settlements on either side of the Delaware River were each called Coryell's Ferry. During the American Revolutionary War, George Washington and his colonial forces twice camped at the home John Holcombe built in 1744.

The Delaware River and the Delaware and Raritan Canal were instrumental in the early prosperity of Lambertville. In June 1834, the opening of the canal was celebrated with a barge ride from Trenton to Lambertville. The canal's completion was not without hardship. 4,000 Irish immigrants were hired to dig the canal with pick and shovel. During the construction, an epidemic of cholera broke out in 1832 and dozens of men were buried along the banks of the canal and the Delaware.

Lambertville was originally incorporated as a town by an act of the New Jersey Legislature on March 1, 1849, from portions of West Amwell Township. It was reincorporated as a city on March 26, 1872.

In the 19th century, due to its proximity to the canal and the Belvidere Delaware Railroad, Lambertville became a factory town. The range of products extended from underwear to rubber bands. After the introduction of motorized vehicles made the canal obsolete, the factories began shutting down. Some lasted into the 1970s. The railroad continued to serve as a vital freight carrier until the mid-1970s. Later, the Black River and Western Railroad acquired the line into town and operated short-distance local freight trains and scenic tourist passenger excursion trains into the late 1990s.

Starting in the early 1980s, with pioneers including the Jonsdottir art gallery, Hamilton Grill and the Lambertville Station eatery (a hotel soon followed), the city began to attract artists and other creative types. These days, much of the town's 18th- and 19th-century flavor remains, including many restored houses. The town has become a tourist destination, with many shops, galleries, restaurants, and B&Bs. The canal path offers cyclists, joggers and walkers a level place to exercise and enjoy views of the canal and Delaware River in all seasons. Lambertville is also largely noted for its socially progressive culture, similar to the neighboring city of New Hope, Pennsylvania.

== Geography ==
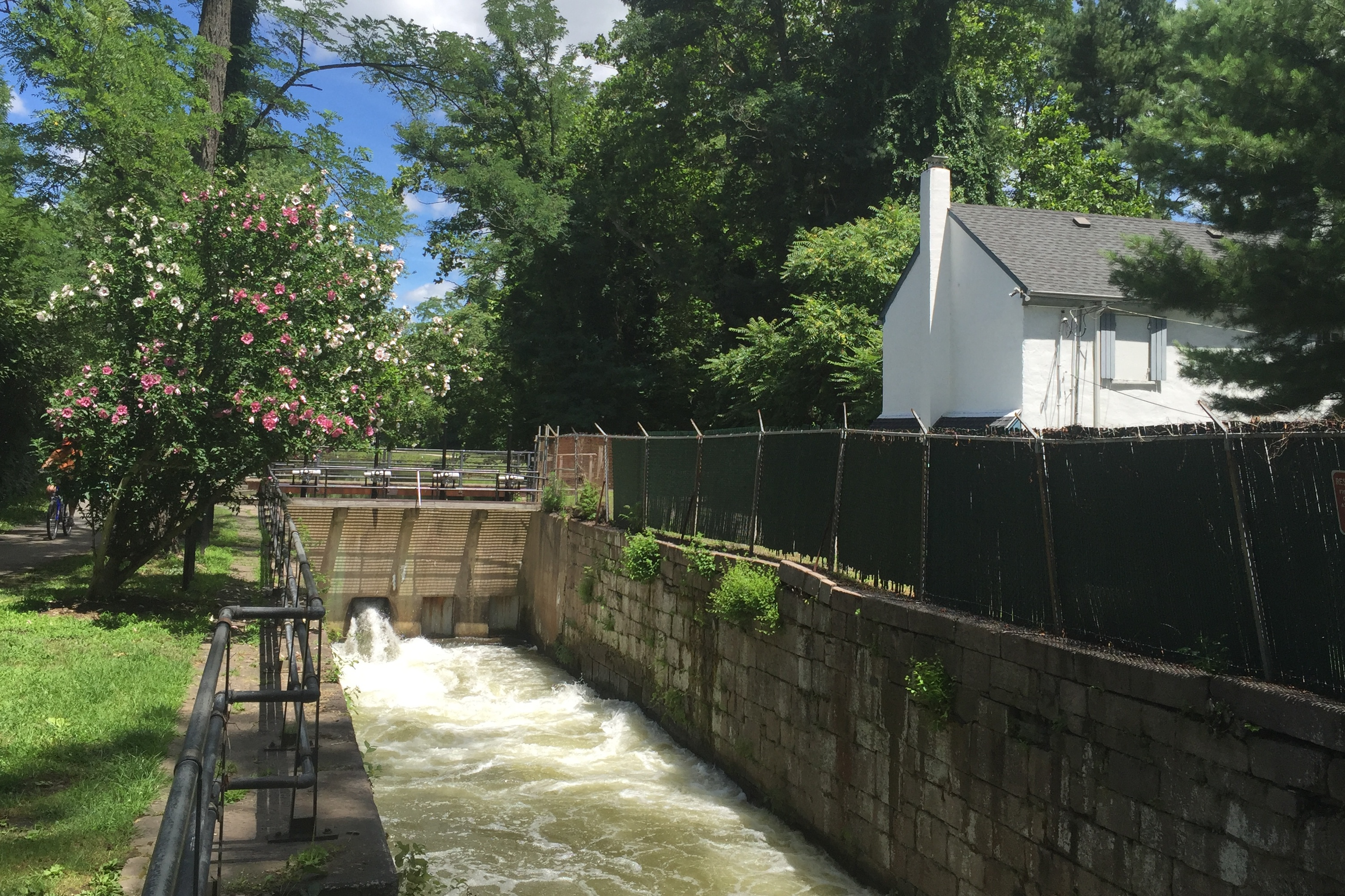
Lock on the feeder canal for the Delaware and Raritan Canal in Lambertville

According to the U.S. Census Bureau, the city had an area of 1.23 square miles (3.17 km^{2}), including 1.08 square miles (2.81 km^{2}) of land and 0.14 square miles (0.36 km^{2}) of water (11.46%). The city borders Delaware Township and West Amwell Township in Hunterdon County and New Hope and Solebury Township across the Delaware River in Bucks County, Pennsylvania.

The Delaware and Raritan Canal flows through the western half of Lambertville, parallel to the Delaware River. Sections of the Delaware and Raritan Canal State Park are in the city, including trails and bridges.

=== Climate ===
Lambertville's climate is characterized by hot, humid summers and generally cold winters. According to the Köppen Climate Classification system, Lambertville has a humid continental climate, abbreviated "Dfa" on climate maps.

Climate data for Lambertville, New Jersey (1991–2020 normals, extremes 1931–2002)
Month	Jan	Feb	Mar	Apr	May	Jun	Jul	Aug	Sep	Oct	Nov	Dec	Year
Record high °F (°C)	74 (23)	75 (24)	88 (31)	95 (35)	97 (36)	100 (38)	104 (40)	101 (38)	104 (40)	95 (35)	84 (29)	75 (24)	104 (40)
Mean daily maximum °F (°C)	41.5 (5.3)	44.2 (6.8)	52.3 (11.3)	63.8 (17.7)	74.3 (23.5)	83.4 (28.6)	87.9 (31.1)	86.6 (30.3)	79.8 (26.6)	68.1 (20.1)	56.2 (13.4)	46.3 (7.9)	65.4 (18.6)
Daily mean °F (°C)	30.2 (−1.0)	33.0 (0.6)	40.7 (4.8)	51.6 (10.9)	61.9 (16.6)	70.5 (21.4)	75.9 (24.4)	73.6 (23.1)	66.7 (19.3)	54.2 (12.3)	44.0 (6.7)	35.4 (1.9)	53.1 (11.7)
Mean daily minimum °F (°C)	19.0 (−7.2)	21.7 (−5.7)	29.2 (−1.6)	39.3 (4.1)	49.4 (9.7)	57.7 (14.3)	63.8 (17.7)	60.6 (15.9)	53.7 (12.1)	40.4 (4.7)	31.9 (−0.1)	24.5 (−4.2)	40.9 (4.9)
Record low °F (°C)	−13 (−25)	−18 (−28)	0 (−18)	13 (−11)	25 (−4)	38 (3)	38 (3)	34 (1)	29 (−2)	22 (−6)	10 (−12)	−5 (−21)	−18 (−28)
Average precipitation inches (mm)	3.65 (93)	2.86 (73)	4.33 (110)	3.81 (97)	4.32 (110)	4.78 (121)	5.11 (130)	4.69 (119)	4.44 (113)	4.26 (108)	3.50 (89)	4.61 (117)	50.36 (1,279)
Average snowfall inches (cm)	5.8 (15)	2.4 (6.1)	2.6 (6.6)	0.2 (0.51)	0.0 (0.0)	0.0 (0.0)	0.0 (0.0)	0.0 (0.0)	0.0 (0.0)	0.0 (0.0)	0.2 (0.51)	2.2 (5.6)	13.4 (34)
Average precipitation days (≥ 0.01 in)	10.4	8.8	10.9	11.3	11.9	10.6	10.0	9.4	8.3	9.5	8.7	10.7	120.5
Average snowy days (≥ 0.1 in)	1.8	1.2	0.9	0.0	0.0	0.0	0.0	0.0	0.0	0.0	0.1	0.8	4.8
Source: NOAA

== Demographics ==
Historical population
Census	Pop.	Note	%±
1850	1,417		—
1860	2,699		90.5%
1870	3,842		42.3%
1880	4,183		8.9%
1890	4,142		−1.0%
1900	4,637		12.0%
1910	4,657		0.4%
1920	4,660		0.1%
1930	4,518		−3.0%
1940	4,447		−1.6%
1950	4,477		0.7%
1960	4,269		−4.6%
1970	4,359		2.1%
1980	4,044		−7.2%
1990	3,927		−2.9%
2000	3,868		−1.5%
2010	3,906		1.0%
2020	4,139		6.0%
2023 (est.)	4,157		0.4%
Population sources: 1850–1920; 1850–1870 1850 1870; 1880–1890 1890–1910; 1910–1930 1940–2000; 2000 2010 2020

=== 2020 census ===
As of the 2020 census, Lambertville had a population of 4,139. The median age was 51.3 years. 13.9% of residents were under the age of 18 and 24.9% of residents were 65 years of age or older. For every 100 females there were 92.8 males, and for every 100 females age 18 and over there were 90.3 males age 18 and over.

99.5% of residents lived in urban areas, while 0.5% lived in rural areas.

There were 2,093 households in Lambertville, of which 17.6% had children under the age of 18 living in them. Of all households, 38.6% were married-couple households, 21.2% were households with a male householder and no spouse or partner present, and 32.0% were households with a female householder and no spouse or partner present. About 40.4% of all households were made up of individuals and 17.4% had someone living alone who was 65 years of age or older.

There were 2,265 housing units, of which 7.6% were vacant. The homeowner vacancy rate was 1.4% and the rental vacancy rate was 4.0%.

Racial composition as of the 2020 census
Race	Number	Percent
White	3,403	82.2%
Black or African American	77	1.9%
American Indian and Alaska Native	18	0.4%
Asian	64	1.5%
Native Hawaiian and Other Pacific Islander	1	0.0%
Some other race	309	7.5%
Two or more races	267	6.5%
Hispanic or Latino (of any race)	525	12.7%

=== 2010 census ===
The 2010 United States census counted 3,906 people, 1,958 households, and 897 families in the city. The population density was 3,386.1 per square mile (1,307.4/km^{2}). There were 2,075 housing units at an average density of 1,798.8 per square mile (694.5/km^{2}). The racial makeup was 91.30% (3,566) White, 1.95% (76) Black or African American, 0.20% (8) Native American, 1.31% (51) Asian, 0.00% (0) Pacific Islander, 4.12% (161) from other races, and 1.13% (44) from two or more races. Hispanic or Latino of any race were 9.75% (381) of the population.

Of the 1,958 households, 15.3% had children under the age of 18; 36.0% were married couples living together; 6.8% had a female householder with no husband present and 54.2% were non-families. Of all households, 41.4% were made up of individuals and 14.5% had someone living alone who was 65 years of age or older. The average household size was 1.98 and the average family size was 2.72.

13.7% of the population were under the age of 18, 5.9% from 18 to 24, 26.9% from 25 to 44, 36.1% from 45 to 64, and 17.4% who were 65 years of age or older. The median age was 47.3 years. For every 100 females, the population had 95.8 males. For every 100 females ages 18 and older there were 93.6 males.

The Census Bureau's 2006–2010 American Community Survey showed that (in 2010 inflation-adjusted dollars) median household income was $71,532 (with a margin of error of +/− $7,040) and the median family income was $100,952 (+/− $14,554). Males had a median income of $57,596 (+/− $17,671) versus $53,869 (+/− $30,408) for females. The per capita income for the borough was $47,684 (+/− $6,399). About 2.3% of families and 6.4% of the population were below the poverty line, including 7.8% of those under age 18 and 5.1% of those age 65 or over.

=== 2000 census ===
As of the 2000 United States census there were 3,868 people, 1,860 households, and 939 families residing in the city. The population density was 3,408.6 inhabitants per square mile (1,316.1/km^{2}). There were 1,961 housing units at an average density of 1,728.1 per square mile (667.2/km^{2}). The racial makeup of the city was 94.65% White, 1.94% African American, 0.34% Native American, 1.06% Asian, 0.05% Pacific Islander, 0.90% from other races, and 1.06% from two or more races. Hispanic or Latino of any race were 3.10% of the population.

There were 1,860 households, out of which 18.3% had children under the age of 18 living with them, 40.3% were married couples living together, 7.8% had a female householder with no husband present, and 49.5% were non-families. 38.8% of all households were made up of individuals, and 10.8% had someone living alone who was 65 years of age or older. 3.7% have unmarried partners. The average household size was 2.06 and the average family size was 2.82.

In the city the population was spread out, with 15.4% under the age of 18, 6.1% from 18 to 24, 32.4% from 25 to 44, 30.9% from 45 to 64, and 15.2% who were 65 years of age or older. The median age was 43 years. For every 100 females, there were 94.8 males. For every 100 females age 18 and over, there were 93.2 males.

The median income for a household in the city was $52,647, and the median income for a family was $80,669. Males had a median income of $47,313 versus $40,369 for females. The per capita income for the city was $36,267. About 4.5% of families and 5.9% of the population were below the poverty line, including 2.5% of those under age 18 and 12.3% of those age 65 or over.

== Government ==
=== Local government ===
Lambertville is the only city in Hunterdon County, and describes itself as one of the smallest cities in the United States. It is governed within the Faulkner Act (formally known as the Optional Municipal charter Law) under the Small Municipality form of government (Plan C), which is available only for municipalities with a population of under 12,000, and was implemented in Lambertville by direct petition as of January 1, 1983. This form of government is used by 18 municipalities (of the 564) statewide and is available to municipalities with fewer than 12,000 residents at the time of adoption. The government comprises the mayor and the four-member city council, with all positions elected at-large on a partisan basis in the November general elections. The mayor is elected directly by the voters to a three-year term of office. Council members serve a term of three years, which are staggered so that two seats come up for election in two years in a three-year cycle, with the mayoral election in the third year.

The mayor exercises executive power; presides over the council with voice and vote, but has no veto power; appoints council committees; appoints the municipal clerk, attorney, tax assessor, tax collector and treasurer, all with council confirmation. The council exercises legislative power and approves the mayor's appointees.

As of 2023, Lambertville's mayor is Democrat Andrew J. Nowick, whose term of office ends December 31, 2024. Members of the city council are Bendetta Lambert (D, 2023), Karen Kominsky (D, 2025), Evan Lide (D, 2025) and Steven Stegman (D, 2023).

In December 2019, the council selected Madeline Urbish to fill the seat expiring in December 2020 that Elaine Warner had held until she resigned earlier that month.

In November 2018, the city council appointed Julia Taylor to fill the seat expiring in December 2019 that became vacant following the resignation the previous month of Steven M. Stegman, who left office to focus on family issues.

In the 2020 City Council primary elections, incumbents Asaro and Urbish lost to Democratic challengers Stegman and Benedetta Lambert, who went on to win in the general election on November 3.

On January 19, 2021, the Borough of Flemington canceled the service agreement to share Business Administrators with Lambertville.

=== Federal, state and county representation ===
Lambertville is in the 7th Congressional District and the 15th state legislative district.

For the 119th United States Congress, New Jersey's 7th congressional district is represented by Thomas Kean Jr. (R, Westfield). New Jersey is represented in the United States Senate by Democrats Cory Booker (Newark, term ends 2027) and Andy Kim (Moorestown, term ends 2031).

For the 2026–2027 session, the 15th legislative district of the New Jersey Legislature is represented in the State Senate by Shirley Turner (D, Lawrence Township) and in the General Assembly by Verlina Reynolds-Jackson (D, Trenton) and Anthony Verrelli (D, Hopewell Township).

Hunterdon County is governed by a Board of County Commissioners comprised of five members who are elected at-large on a partisan basis to serve three-year terms of office on a staggered basis, with either one or two seats up for election each year as part of the November general election. At an annual reorganization meeting held each January, the commissioners select one member to serve as the board's Director and another to serve as Deputy Director, each for a one-year term. As of 2025, Hunterdon County's Commissioners are Director John E. Lanza (R; Raritan Township, 2025), Deputy Director Shaun C. Van Doren (R; Tewksbury Township, 2026), Jeff Kuhl (R; Raritan Township, 2027), Zachary T. Rich (R; West Amwell Township, 2025) and Susan Soloway (R; Franklin Township, 2027).

Constitutional officers elected on a countywide basis are Clerk Mary H. Melfi (R; Flemington, 2026), Sheriff Fredrick W. Brown (R; Alexandria Township, 2025) and Surrogate Heidi Rohrbach (R; Lebanon Township, 2028).

=== Politics ===
As of March 2011, there were 3,053 registered voters in Lambertville, of whom 1,395 (45.7%) were registered Democrats, 569 (18.6%) were registered Republicans and 1,087 (35.6%) were unaffiliated. Two voters were registered as either Libertarians or Greens.

Gubernatorial election results for Lambertville
Year	Republican		Democratic		Third party(ies)	
Year	No.	%	No.	%	No.	%
2025	435	18.58%	1,896	80.99%	10	0.43%
2021	496	23.69%	1,573	75.12%	25	1.19%
2017	375	20.89%	1,372	76.43%	48	2.67%
2013	633	43.36%	798	54.66%	29	1.99%
2009	560	31.85%	1,068	60.75%	130	7.39%
2005	498	30.65%	1,068	65.72%	59	3.63%

In the 2012 presidential election, Democrat Barack Obama received 71.8% of the vote (1,684), ahead of Republican Mitt Romney's 26.7% (627), and other candidates' 1.5% (35), among the 2,361 ballots cast by the city's 3,296 registered voters (15 ballots were spoiled), for a turnout of 71.6%. In the 2008 presidential election, Obama received 71.1% of the vote (1,744), ahead of Republican John McCain's 26.8% (658) and other candidates' 1.4% (35), among the 2,453 ballots cast by the city's 3,099 registered voters, for a turnout of 79.2%. In the 2004 presidential election, Democrat John Kerry received 68.1% of the vote (1,495), outpolling Republican George W. Bush's 30.8% (677) and other candidates' 0.5% (15), among the 2,195 ballots cast by the city's 2,738 registered voters, for a turnout of 80.2%.

United States presidential election results for Lambertville
Year	Republican		Democratic		Third party(ies)	
Year	No.	%	No.	%	No.	%
2024	522	19.42%	2,117	78.76%	49	1.82%
2020	610	21.65%	2,176	77.25%	31	1.10%
2016	579	23.02%	1,826	72.60%	110	4.37%
2012	627	26.73%	1,684	71.78%	35	1.49%
2008	658	27.00%	1,744	71.56%	35	1.44%
2004	677	30.96%	1,495	68.36%	15	0.69%

In the 2013 gubernatorial election, Democrat Barbara Buono received 54.7% of the vote (798), ahead of Republican Chris Christie's 43.4% (633), and other candidates' 2.0% (29), among the 1,501 ballots cast by the city's 3,231 registered voters (41 ballots were spoiled), for a turnout of 46.5%. In the 2009 gubernatorial election, Democrat Jon Corzine received 59.5% of the vote (1,068), ahead of Christie's 31.2% (560), Independent Chris Daggett's 6.6% (118) and other candidates' 0.7% (12), among the 1,795 ballots cast by the city's 3,036 registered voters, yielding a 59.1% turnout.

United States Senate election results for Lambertville1
Year	Republican		Democratic		Third party(ies)	
Year	No.	%	No.	%	No.	%
2024	489	18.69%	2,085	79.67%	43	1.64%
2018	556	23.75%	1,710	73.05%	75	3.20%
2012	547	24.56%	1,605	72.07%	75	3.37%
2006	444	27.54%	1,127	69.91%	41	2.54%

United States Senate election results for Lambertville2
Year	Republican		Democratic		Third party(ies)	
Year	No.	%	No.	%	No.	%
2020	609	21.91%	2,105	75.75%	65	2.34%
2014	320	23.29%	1,032	75.11%	22	1.60%
2013	259	23.17%	845	75.58%	14	1.25%
2008	711	31.42%	1,490	65.84%	62	2.74%

== Transportation ==
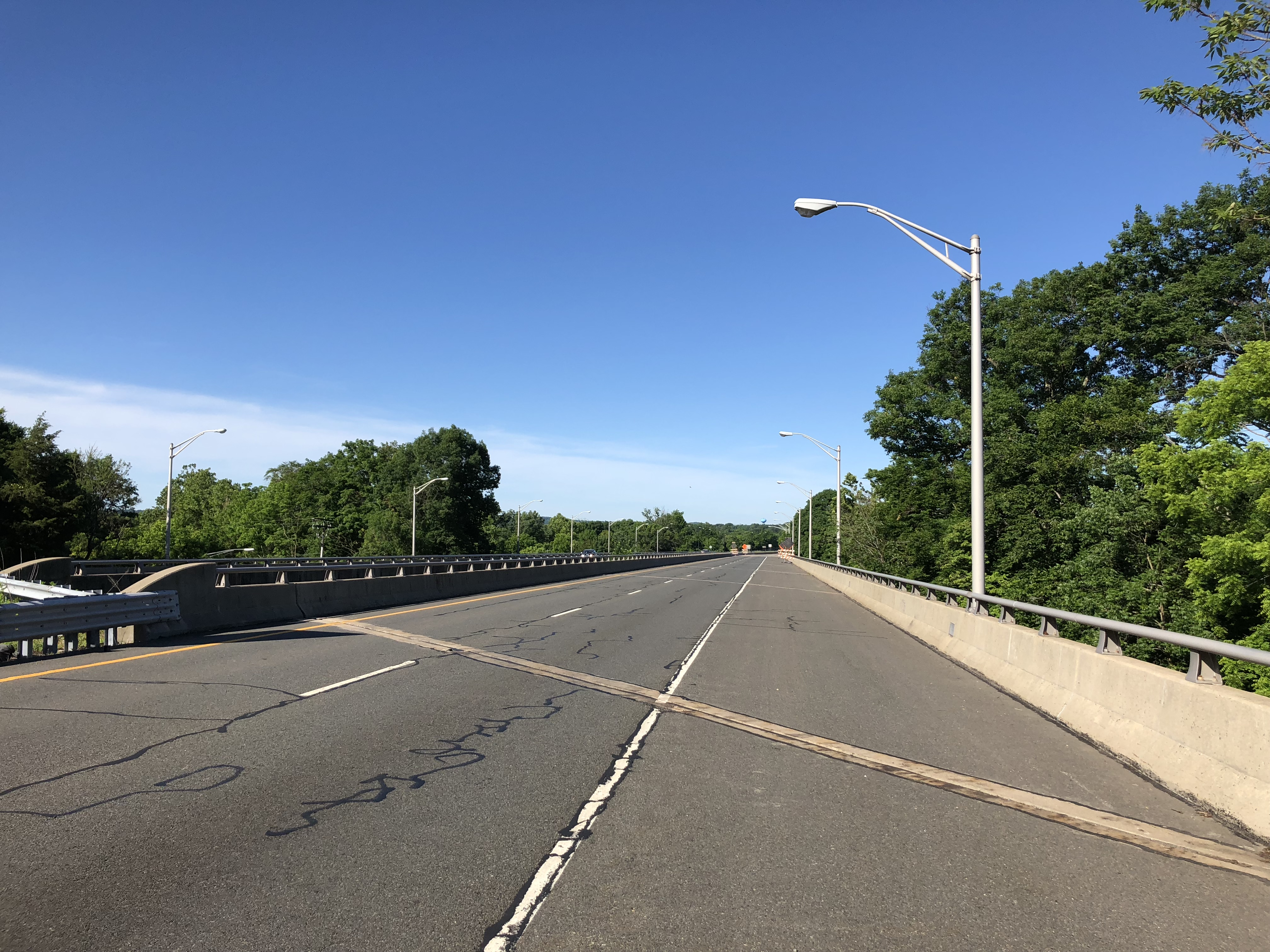
U.S. Route 202 in Lambertville

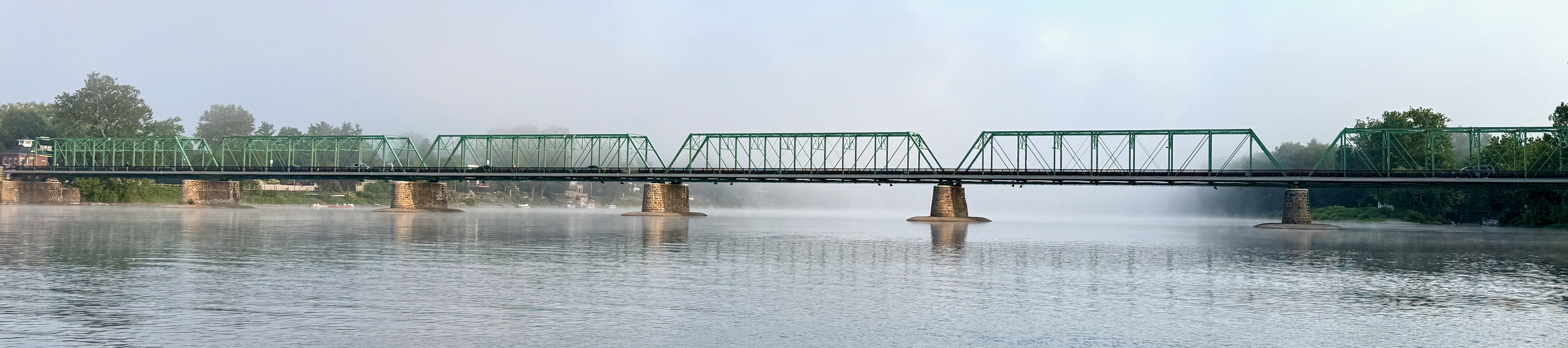
New Hope–Lambertville Bridge crossing the Delaware River

As of May 2010, Lambertville had 16.67 miles (26.83 km) of roadways, of which 12.77 miles (20.55 km) were maintained by the municipality, 0.70 miles (1.13 km) by Hunterdon County, 3.09 miles (4.97 km) by the New Jersey Department of Transportation and 0.11 miles (0.18 km) by the Delaware River Joint Toll Bridge Commission.

U.S. Route 202 is the most prominent highway to pass through Lambertville. Other major roads that pass through include Route 29, Route 165 and County Route 518.

No interstate highways pass through, but there are several nearby, such as Interstate 78 in Franklin Township and Interstate 295 in Hopewell Township.

The Delaware River Joint Toll Bridge Commission operates the toll-free New Hope–Lambertville Bridge, which stretches 1,053 feet (321 m) across the Delaware River, connecting PA 179 in New Hope, Pennsylvania, with NJ 179. Constructed in 1904 as the third bridge on the site, the bridge stretches 1,053 feet (321 m) across the Delaware River. The original bridge, designed by Lewis Wernwag, was constructed in 1814 and destroyed in 1841. A second bridge completed in 1842 was destroyed by flooding in 1903.

== Education ==
The South Hunterdon Regional School District serves students in pre-kindergarten through 12th grade from Lambertville, Stockton and West Amwell Township. Each of the three municipalities had its own school through sixth grade until the Stockton school was closed after the 2017–18 school year; public school students in 7th through 12th grades attend a shared high school in Lambertville. As of the 2022–23 school year, the district, comprised of three schools, had an enrollment of 827 students and 108.1 classroom teachers (on an FTE basis), for a student–teacher ratio of 7.7:1. Schools in the district (with 2022–23 enrollment data from the National Center for Education Statistics) are South Hunterdon Regional Elementary School for grades PreK–4 (was Lambertville Public School, which had 221 students in grades PreK–6), South Hunterdon Regional Middle School for grades 5–8 (was West Amwell School, with 170 students in grades K–6) and South Hunterdon Regional High School for grades 9–12 (which had 417 students in grades 7–12). Lambertville is assigned five of the nine seats on the regional district's board of education.

In a September 2013 special election, voters from Lambertville, Stockton and West Amwell Township passed referendums to dissolve the South Hunterdon Regional High School District and combine the three existing school districts from each municipality (Lambertville City School District, Stockton Borough School District and West Amwell Township School District), with majorities in each community passing both ballot items. A single combined regional Pre-K–12 district was created, with property taxes levied under a formula in which 57% is based on property values and 43% on the number of students. The executive county superintendent appointed an interim board of education for the new regional district, which was responsible for implementing the merger.

Before the creation of the South Hunterdon district, students had attended Lambertville High School, which was constructed in 1854 and closed in September 1960, and has since been the subject of various legends described in Weird NJ.

Eighth-grade students from Hunterdon County are eligible to apply to attend the high school programs offered by the Hunterdon County Vocational School District, a county-wide vocational school district that offers career and technical education at its campuses in Raritan Township and at programs sited at local high schools, with no tuition charged.

== Community ==
Annually, in April, the City of Lambertville celebrates the return of the shad, a fish that supplied the Lewis Island Fishery in Lambertville as of 1888. The festival launched in 1981 and is organized by the Greater Lambertville Chamber of Commerce. Featuring vendors' booths focusing on the area arts community, the ShadFest supports local nonprofits that support Lambertville-area residents and businesses. Lambertville is well-known as having a gay friendly vibe, along with its neighboring community of New Hope, Pennsylvania, situated across the Delaware River.

== Dining ==
Lambertville is known for an array of dining opportunities, ranging from casual family-owned to eclectic and upscale options.

== Historic sites ==
Lambertville has several properties listed on the National Register of Historic Places. The James W. Marshall House was added in 1970. The Delaware and Raritan Canal, which flows through the city, was added as a historic district in 1973. The Lambertville House was added in 1978. Nearly the entire city was listed as the Lambertville Historic District in 1983. The Kalmia Club was added in 2012. The Lambertville City Hall, originally known as the A. H. Holcombe House, is part of the historic district.

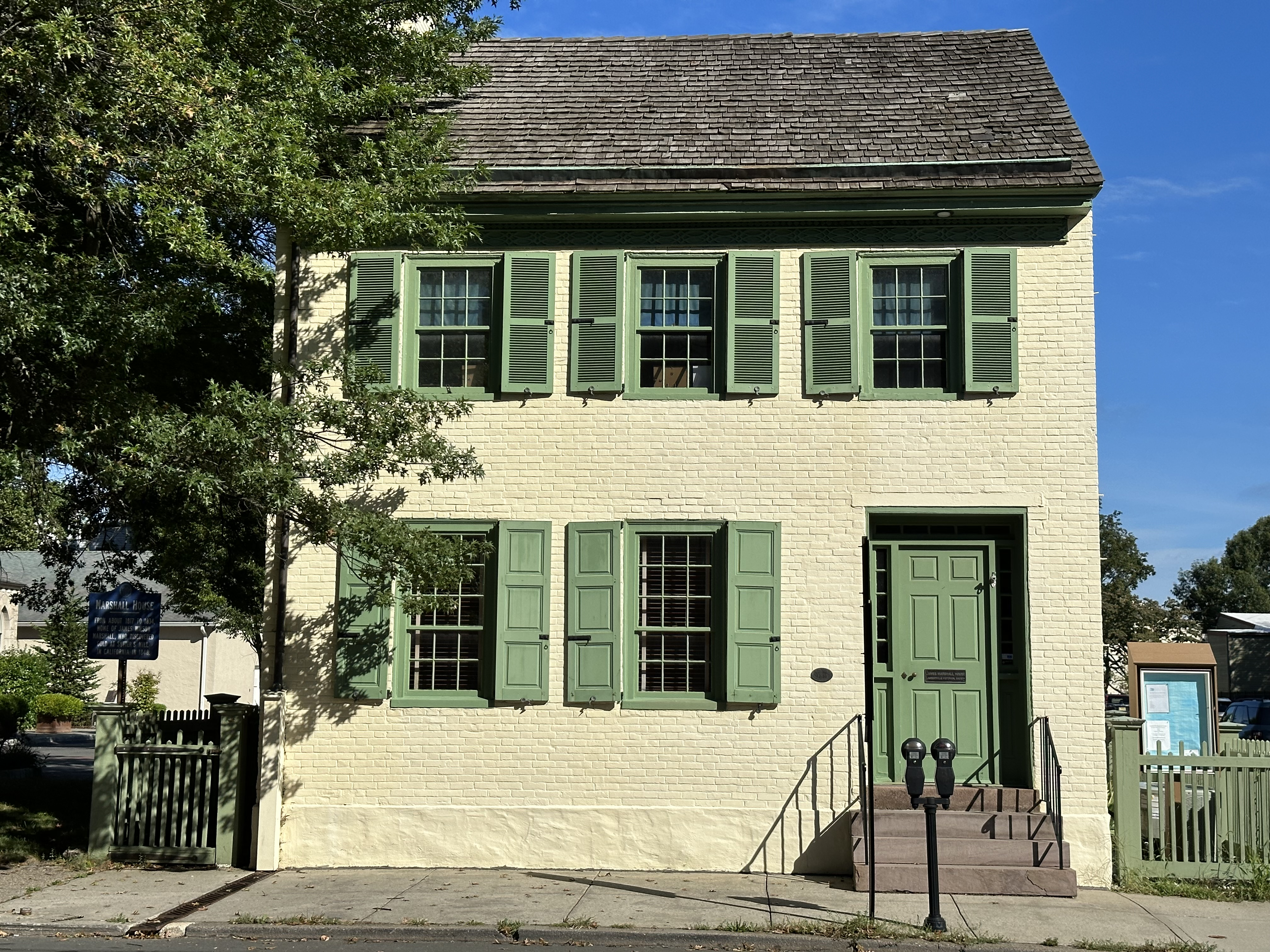
James W. Marshall House

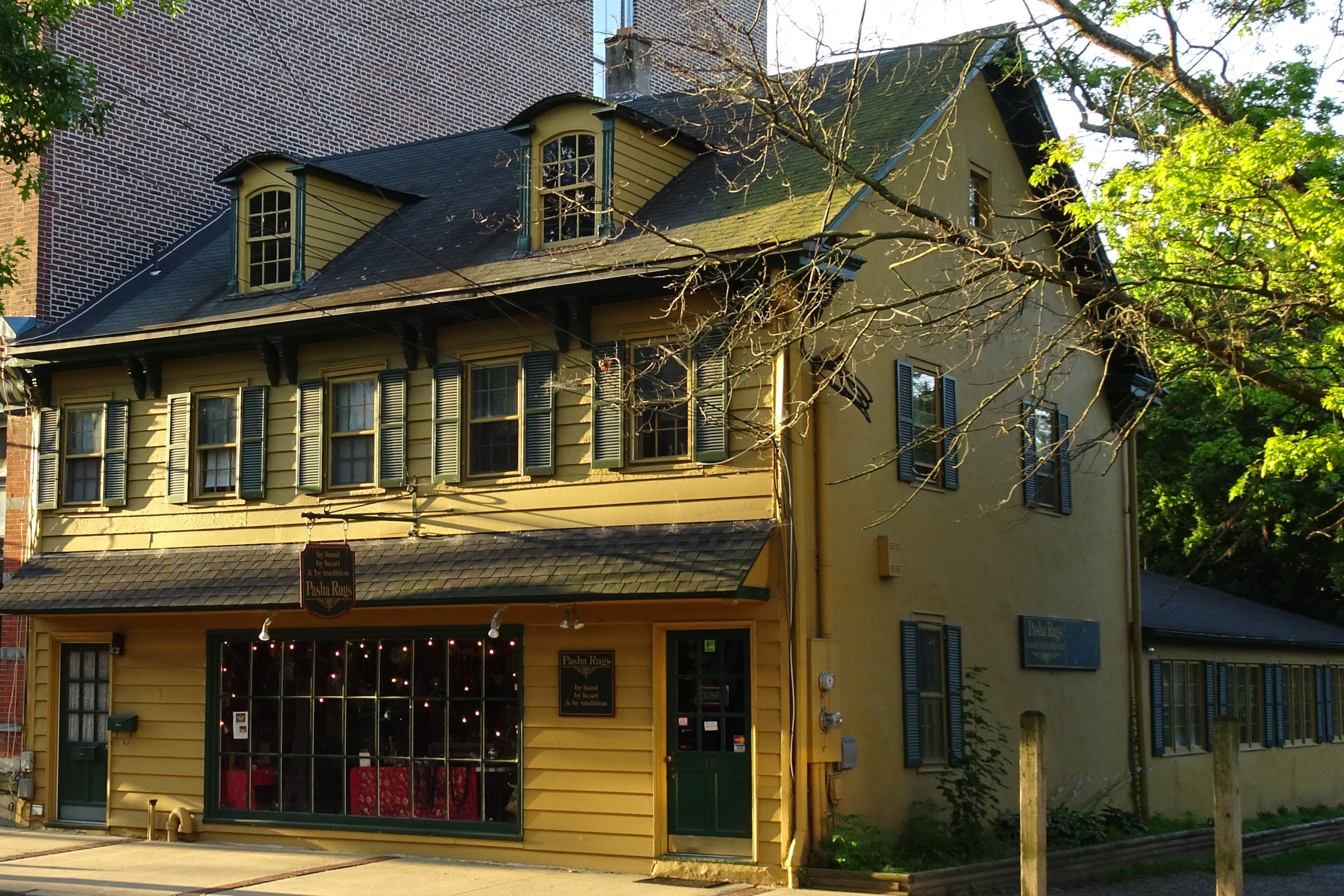
Bridge Tender's House for the Delaware and Raritan Canal

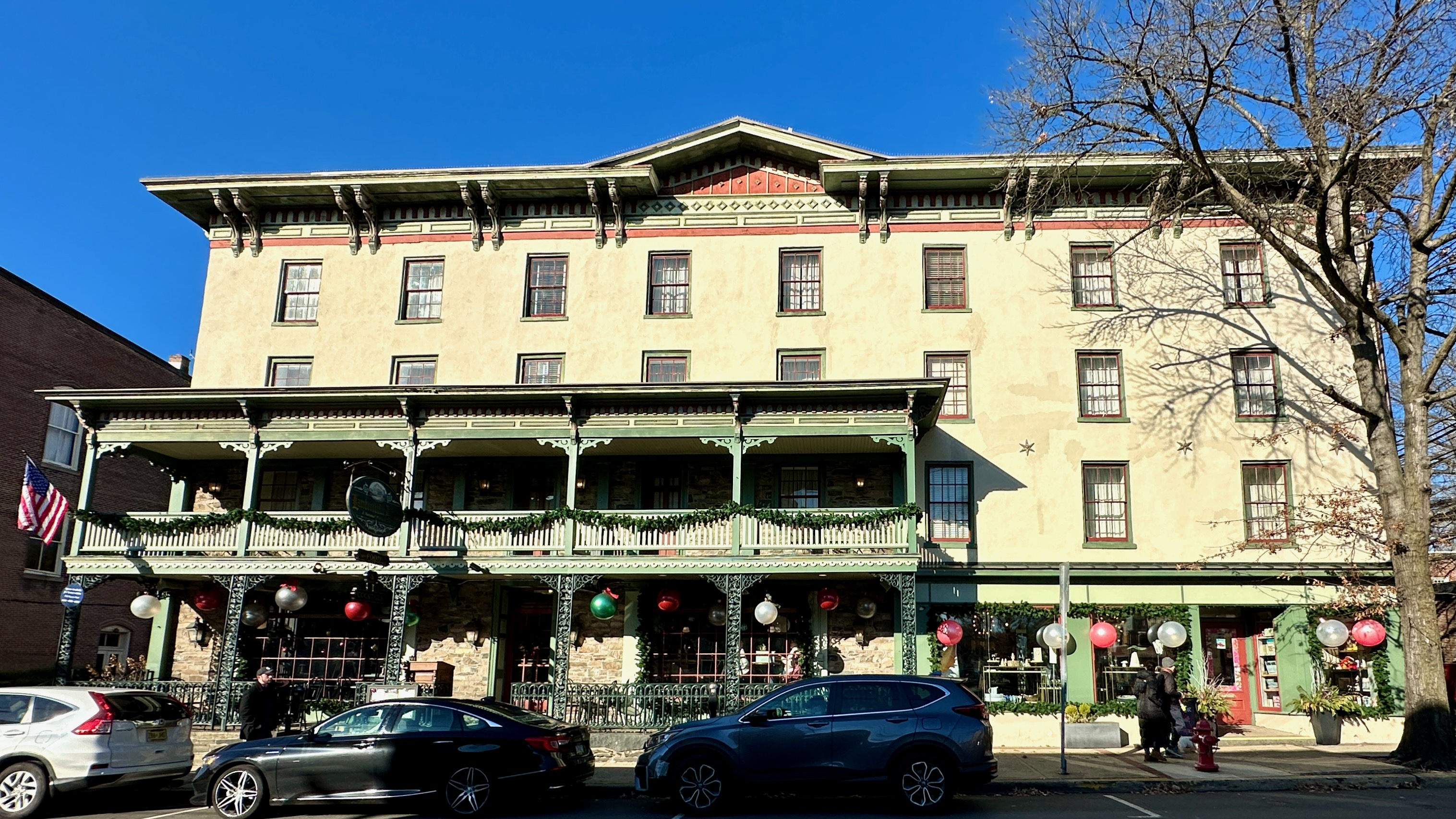
Lambertville House

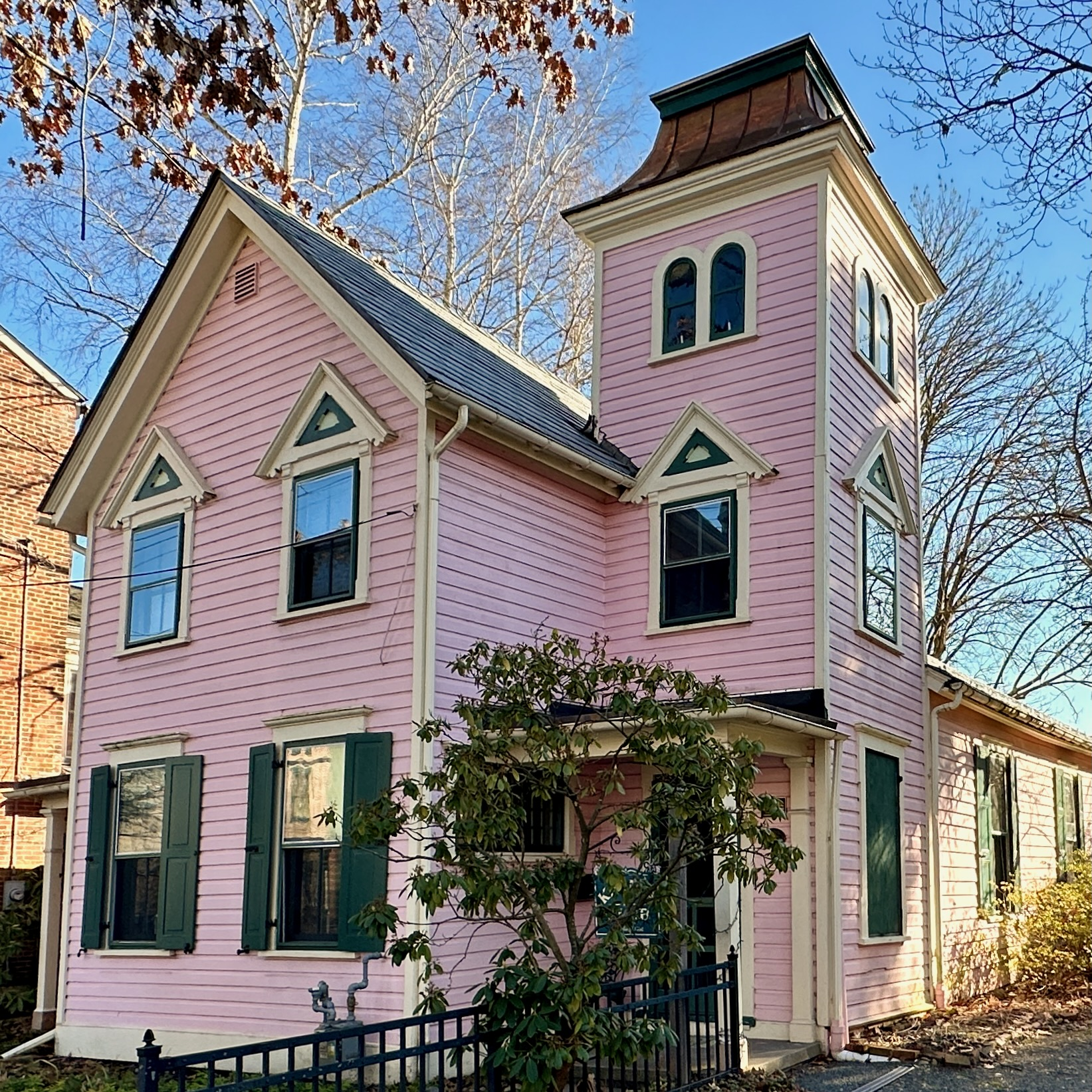
Kalmia Club

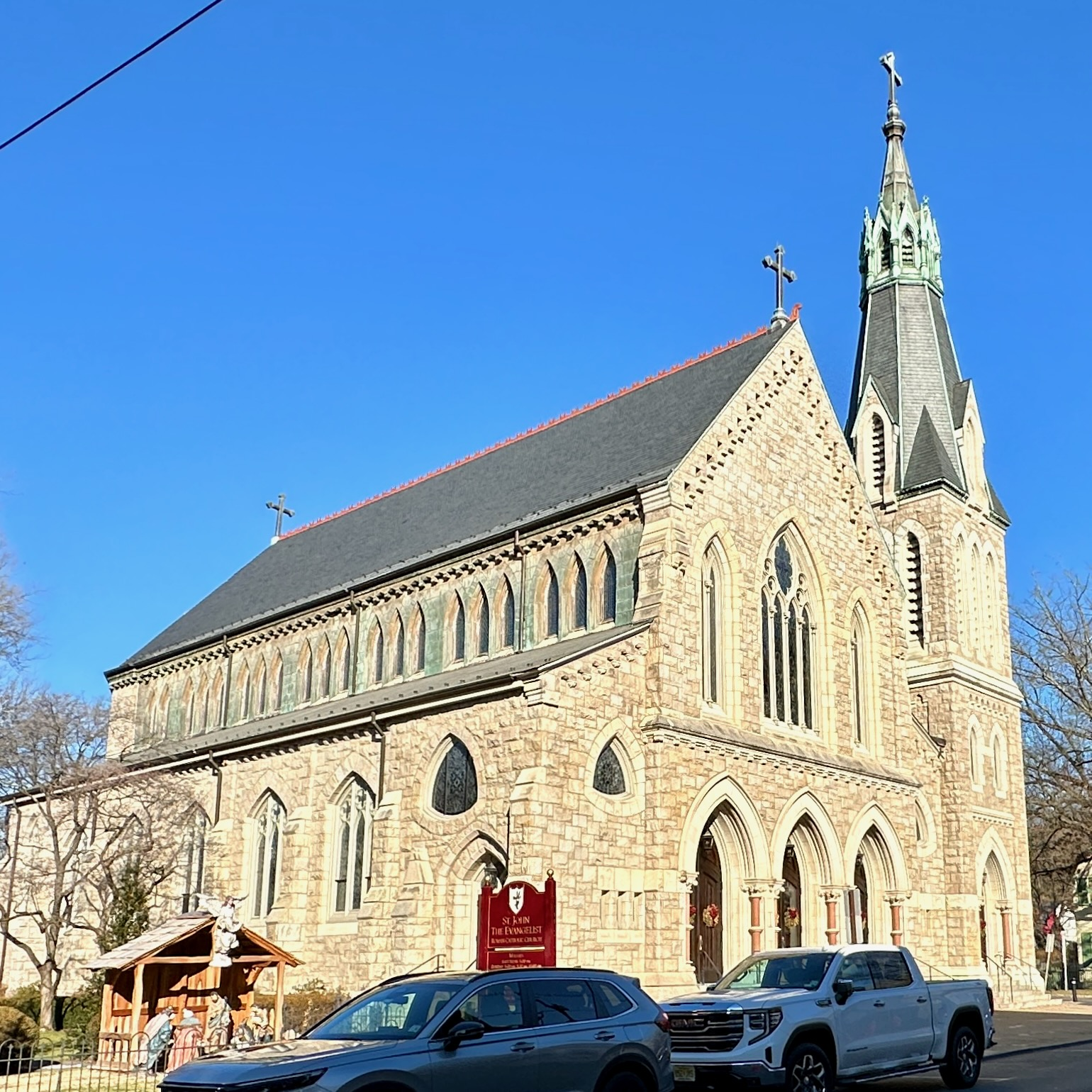
St. John the Evangelist Roman Catholic Church

== Notable people ==
People who were born in, residents of, or otherwise closely associated with Lambertville include:

- Jani Allan (1952-2023), South African journalist, columnist, and media personality lived and worked as a waitress in Lambertville from 2001 to 2012.
- Bradley M. Campbell (born 1961), former head of the New Jersey Department of Environmental Protection
- Lucilla Green Cheney (1853–1878), physician and medical missionary
- James Gould Cozzens (1903–1978), novelist and Pulitzer Prize winner
- Elsie Driggs (1898–1992), painter mostly known for her contributions to the Precisionist movement of the 1920s
- Anne Elstner (1899–1981), actress who played the title role in the radio soap opera Stella Dallas from 1937–1955 and operated the River's Edge restaurant in Lambertville until 1973
- Jamie Fox (1954-2017), political strategist
- Anne Garefino (born 1959), co-producer of Comedy Central's South Park and the Broadway musical The Book of Mormon
- William Crane Gray (1835–1919), elected in 1892 as the first Bishop of the Episcopal Missionary Jurisdiction of Southern Florida
- Harry Haenigsen (1900–1990), cartoonist best known for his comic strip Penny
- George Holcombe (1786–1828), member of the United States House of Representatives from New Jersey's at-large congressional district
- William Holcombe (1804–1870), first Lieutenant Governor of Minnesota
- John E. Hunt (1908–1989), represented New Jersey's 1st congressional district in the United States House of Representatives from 1967 to 1975
- John Lambert (1746–1823), U.S. Senator and namesake of Lambertville
- Samuel Lilly (1816–1880), represented New Jersey's 3rd congressional district from 1853 to 1855. Lilly served as the first mayor of Lambertville, serving in office from 1849–1852
- Anne Marie Macari (born 1955), poet
- James W. Marshall (1810–1885), discoverer of gold at Sutter's Mill in California in 1848
- James McBride (born 1957), author and musician
- Scott Metzger (born 1977), guitarist who has performed with Joe Russo's Almost Dead and Phil and Friends
- Bror Julius Olsson Nordfeldt (1878–1955), Swedish-born, American artist best known for his seascapes and depictions of New Mexico's indigenous culture
- Erik Peterson (born 1966), member of the New Jersey General Assembly
- Horace Griggs Prall (1881–1951), attorney and politician who served in both houses of the New Jersey Legislature
- John Runk (1791–1872), represented New Jersey's 3rd congressional district in the United States House of Representatives from 1845–1847
- Charles Bradford Smith (1916–2004), United States Army Brigadier general who received the Silver Star medal for his service in South Korea
- Gerald Stern (1925-2022), poet who was Poet Laureate of New Jersey from 2000 to 2002
- Kyle Tress (born 1981), Olympic athlete in the sport of skeleton
- Gene Ween (born 1970), founding member of the band Ween
- Gary Woodward, author and retired professor who was an early contributor to the field of political communication
