= James W. Marshall =

American pioneer who discovered gold in California (1810–1885)

- Marshall c. 1880–1885
- Born: James Wilson Marshall; October 8, 1810; Hopewell Township, New Jersey, U.S.
- Died: August 10, 1885 (aged 74); Kelsey, California, U.S.
- Known for: Discovery of gold at Sutter's Mill

James Wilson Marshall (October 8, 1810 – August 10, 1885) was an American carpenter and sawmill operator, who on January 24, 1848, reported the finding of gold at Coloma, California, a small settlement on the American River about 36 miles northeast of Sacramento. His discovery was the impetus for the California gold rush. The mill property was owned by Johann (John) Sutter who employed Marshall to build his mill. The wave of gold seekers turned everyone's attention away from the mill which eventually fell into disrepair and was never used as intended. Neither Marshall nor Sutter ever profited from the gold find.

== Biography ==
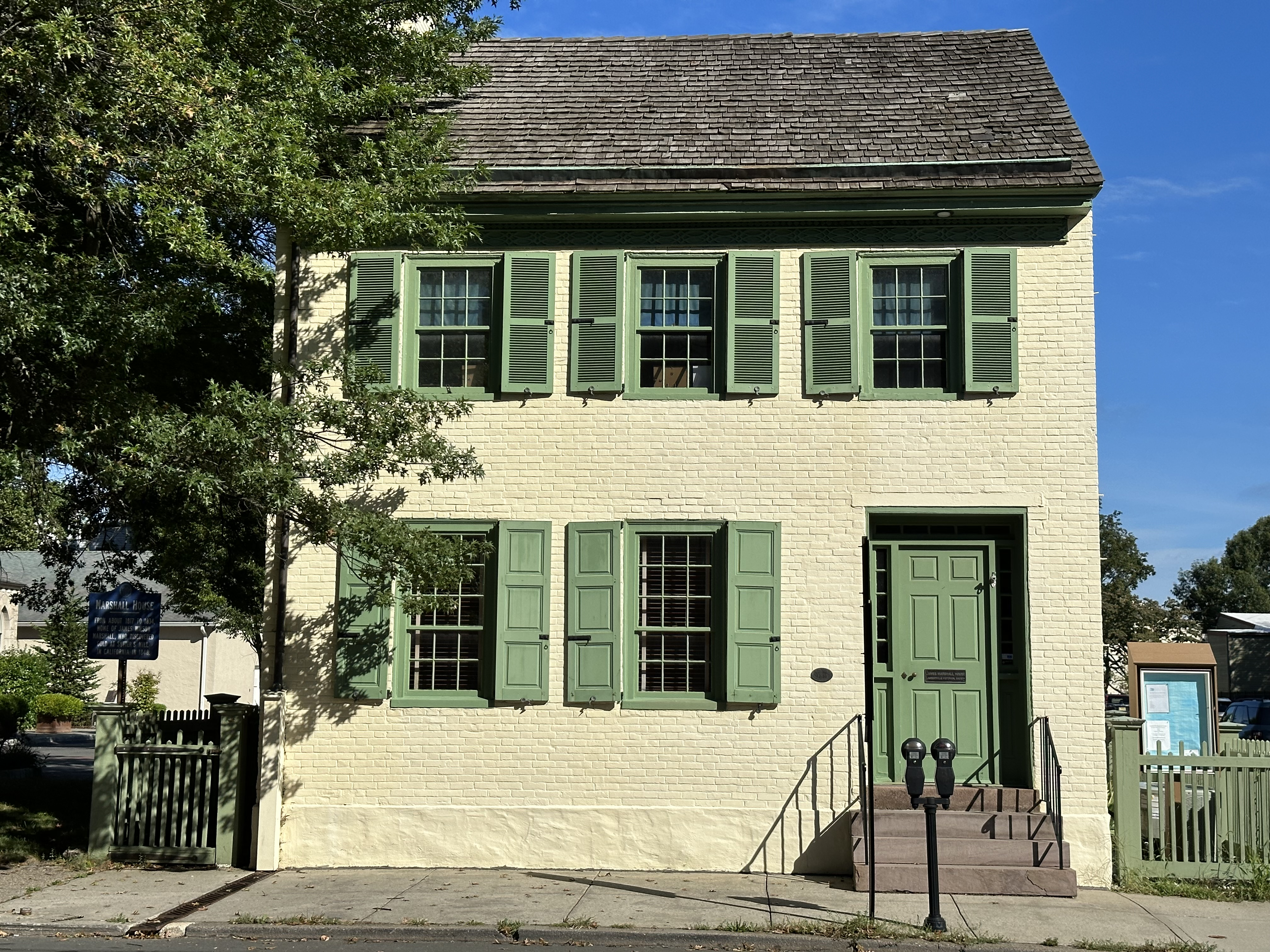
The James W. Marshall House, former residence of Marshall family in Lambertville, New Jersey

James Wilson Marshall, of English descent, was born to Philip Marshall and Sarah Wilson (married 1808) at the family homestead in Hopewell Township, New Jersey (then part of Hunterdon County, New Jersey, currently part of Mercer County) on October 8, 1810. The family homestead was known as the Round Mountain Farm and is still known as Marshalls Corner. He was the oldest of four children, and the only male. In 1816, the Marshall family relocated to nearby Lambertville, where Philip constructed a still-surviving house on approximately five acres of land.

James left New Jersey in 1834 and headed west. After spending time in Indiana and Illinois, he settled in Missouri (in an area created by the Platte Purchase) in 1844, and began farming along the Missouri River. It was there that he contracted malaria, a common affliction in the area. On the advice of his doctor, Marshall left Missouri in the hopes of improving his health. He joined an emigrant train heading west and arrived in Oregon's Willamette Valley in the spring of 1845. He left Oregon in June 1845 and headed south along the Siskiyou Trail into California, eventually reaching Sutter's Fort, California, an agricultural settlement, in mid-July. John Sutter, the founder of Sutter's Fort, was also the alcalde of the area, as California was still a Mexican possession in 1845. Sutter hired Marshall to assist with work at the sawmill, and around the fort (carpentry, primarily). He also helped Marshall to buy two leagues of land on the north side of Butte Creek (a tributary of the Sacramento River) and provided him with cattle. It was here that Marshall began his second stint as a farmer.

Soon after this, the Mexican–American War began in May 1846. Marshall volunteered and served under Captain John C. Frémont's California Battalion during the Bear Flag Revolt. When he left the battalion and returned to his ranch in early 1847, he found that all his cattle had either strayed or been stolen. With his sole source of income gone, Marshall lost his land.

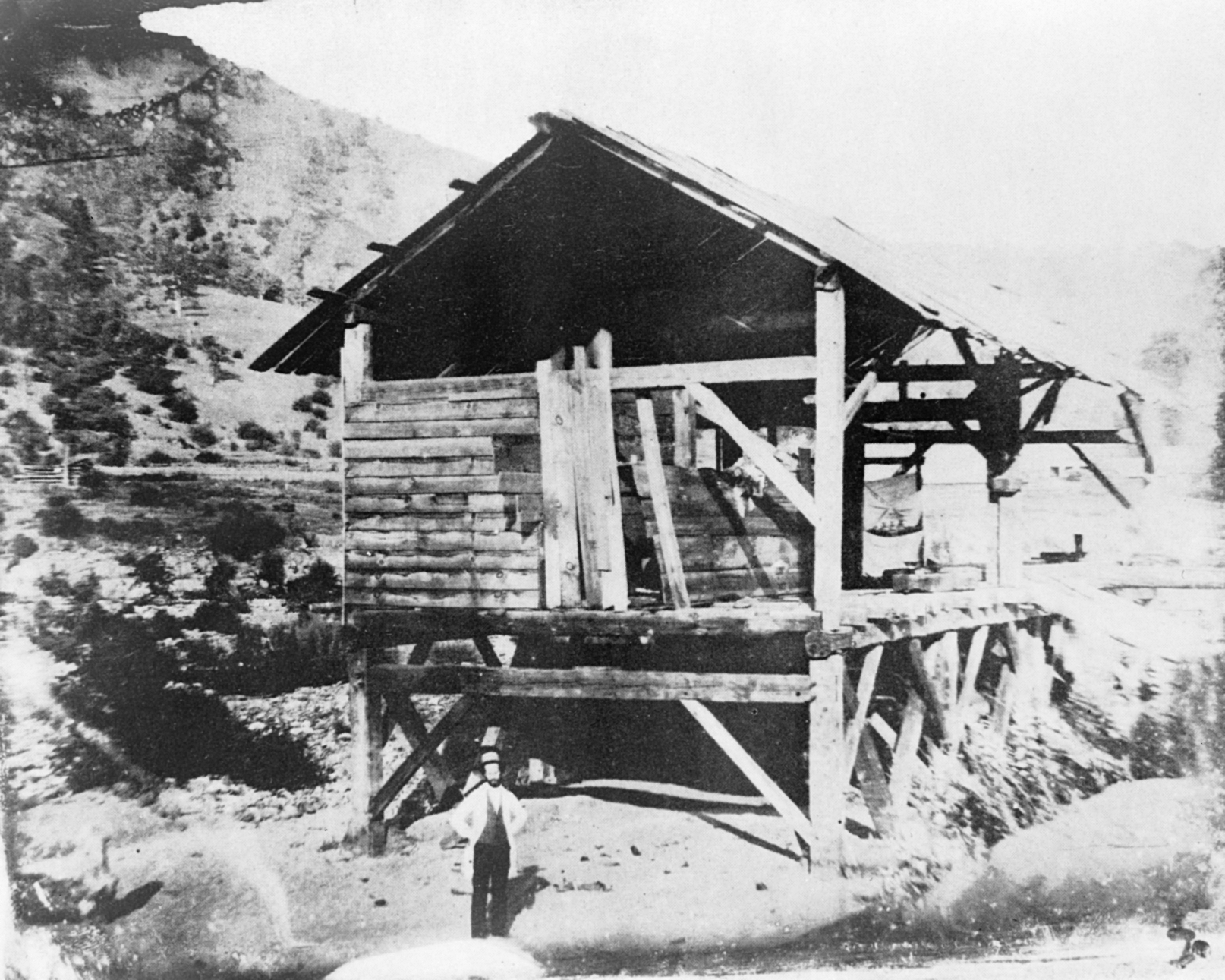
The caption with this photo at the Library of Congress claims that this was Marshall in front of the mill in 1850. However, historians at Marshall Gold State Historic Park have concluded that it is not Marshall and believe it to be the photographer's assistant put in the photo to show scale.

Marshall soon entered into a partnership with Sutter for the construction of a sawmill. Marshall was to oversee the construction and operation of the mill, and would in return receive a portion of the lumber. After scouting nearby areas for a suitable location, he eventually decided upon Coloma, located roughly 40 miles (64 km) upstream of Sutter's Fort on the American River. He proposed his plan to Sutter, and construction began in late August. His crew consisted mainly of local Native Americans and veterans of the Mormon Battalion on their way to Salt Lake City, Utah.

Construction continued into January 1848, when it was discovered that the tailrace portion of the mill (the ditch that drained water away from the waterwheel) was too narrow and shallow for the volume of water needed to operate the saw. Marshall decided to use the natural force of the river to excavate and enlarge the tailrace. This could only be done at night, so as not to endanger the lives of the men working on the mill during the day. Every morning Marshall examined the results of the previous night's excavation.

== Gold discovery ==
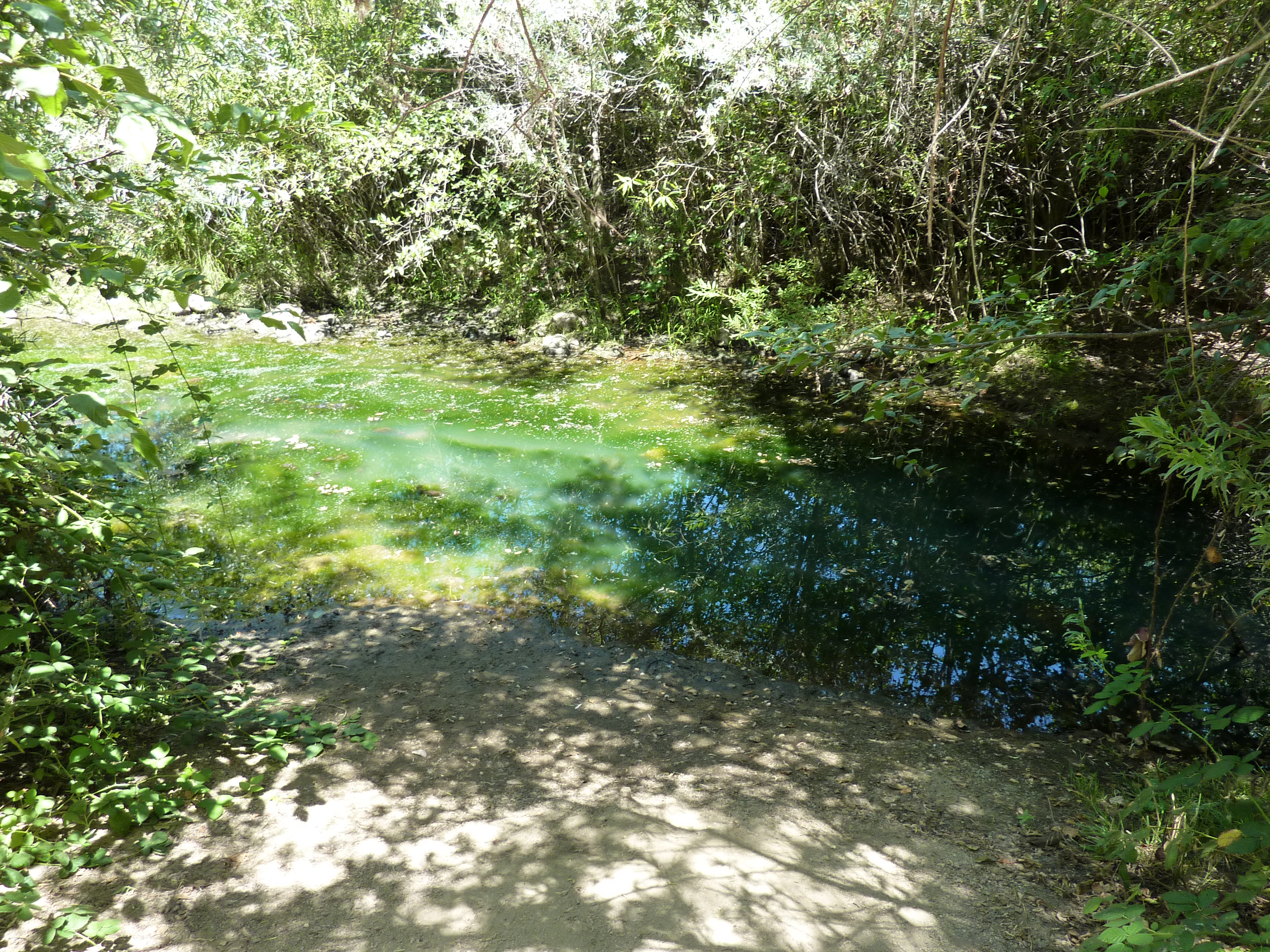
The spot where Marshall first discovered the gold that started the California Gold Rush

On the morning of January 24, 1848, Marshall was examining the channel below the mill when he noticed some shiny flecks in the channel bed. As later recounted by Marshall:

I picked up one or two pieces and examined them attentively; and having some general knowledge of minerals, I could not call to mind more than two which in any way resembled this, iron, very bright and brittle; and gold, bright, yet malleable. I then tried it between two rocks, and found that it could be beaten into a different shape, but not broken. I then collected four or five pieces and went up to Mr. Scott (who was working at the carpenter's bench making the mill wheel) with the pieces in my hand and said, "I have found it."

"What is it?" inquired Scott.
"Gold," I answered.
"Oh! no," replied Scott, "That can't be."
I said,--"I know it to be nothing else."

— James W. Marshall

The metal was confirmed to be gold after members of Marshall's crew performed tests on the metal—boiling it in lye soap and hammering it to test its malleability. Marshall, still concerned with the completion of the sawmill, permitted his crew to search for gold during their free time.

By the time Marshall returned to Sutter's Fort, four days later, the war had ended and California was about to fall under American possession subsequent to the signing of the Treaty Of Guadalupe Hidalgo on February 2, 1848. Marshall shared his discovery with Sutter, who performed further tests on the gold and told Marshall that it was "of the finest quality, of at least 23 karat [96% pure]".

Lithograph of Marshall by Britton & Rey, 1854

News of the discovery soon reached around the world. The immediate impact on Marshall was negative. His sawmill failed when all the able-bodied men in the area abandoned everything to search for gold. Before long, arriving hordes of prospectors forced him off his land. Marshall soon left the area.

Marshall returned to Coloma in 1857 and found some success in the 1860s with a vineyard that he started. That venture ended in failure towards the end of the decade, due mostly to higher taxes and increased competition. He returned to prospecting in the hopes of finding success.

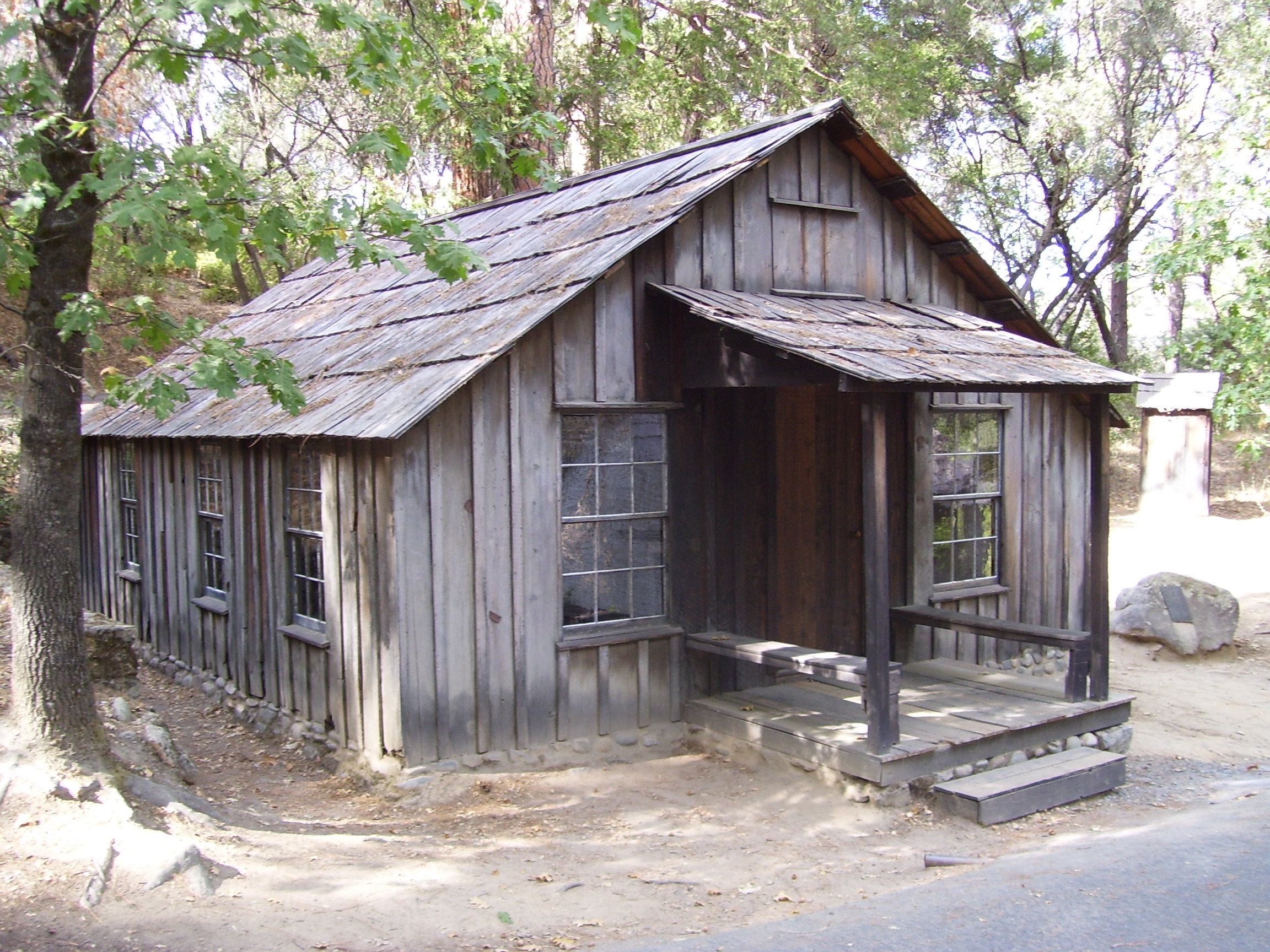
Marshall's cabin in Coloma, California

He became a partner in a gold mine near Kelsey, California but the mine yielded nothing and left Marshall practically bankrupt. The California State Legislature awarded him a two-year pension in 1872 in recognition of his role in an important era in California history. It was renewed in 1874 and 1876 but lapsed in 1878. Marshall, penniless, eventually ended up in a small cabin.

Marshall died in Kelsey on August 10, 1885. In 1886, the members of the Native Sons of the Golden West, Placerville Parlor #9 felt that the "Discoverer of Gold" deserved a monument to mark his final resting place. In May 1890, five years after Marshall's death, Placerville Parlor #9 of the Native Sons of the Golden West successfully advocated the idea of a monument to the State Legislature, which appropriated a total of $9,000 (~$285,904 in 2024) for the construction of a monument and tomb which can be seen today, the first such monument erected in California. A statue of Marshall stands on top of the monument, pointing to the spot where he made his discovery in 1848. The monument was rededicated October 8, 2010, by the Native Sons of the Golden West, Georgetown Parlor #91 in honor of the 200th Anniversary of James W. Marshall's birth.
