= James Marshall (producer) =

British television producer and creator

James Marshall is a British television producer and creator known for his work on The American Dream Project, which was nominated for a 44th Daytime Creative Arts Emmy, and American Doers, which is hosted on People Entertainment Weekly Network as of April 2017. Both shows were produced through his company, Happy Marshall Productions.

== Early life ==
Marshall was born in London, England and raised in Royal Windsor by his single mother, Linda Anne Edwards. Marshall is the middle child of three with an older sister Julia Elizabeth Porter, and a young brother, Peter George Edwards.

== Career ==
In 2007, Marshall moved to New York to pursue his career in corporate America.

In 2012, Marshall created his current company, Happy Marshall Productions, which produces web based content that has been hosted on sites including Netflix, Amazon Prime, People.com, Hulu, and iTunes.

== Shows ==
Title	Role	Year released	Partners	Awards	Notable Guests
Jogging with James	Creator, Host, Executive Producer	2013	GQ Magazine, Conde Nast		Lee Pace, Melissa George, Nigel Barker, Brendon Ayanbadejo
The American Dream Project	Creator, Host, Executive Producer	2015	Cole Haan	44th Daytime Creative Arts Emmy (nominated)	
American Doers	Creator, Host, Executive Producer	2016	People, Time Inc., Pfizer		
