= James W. Marshall House =

Historic house in New Jersey, United States

- U.S. National Register of Historic Places
- New Jersey Register of Historic Places
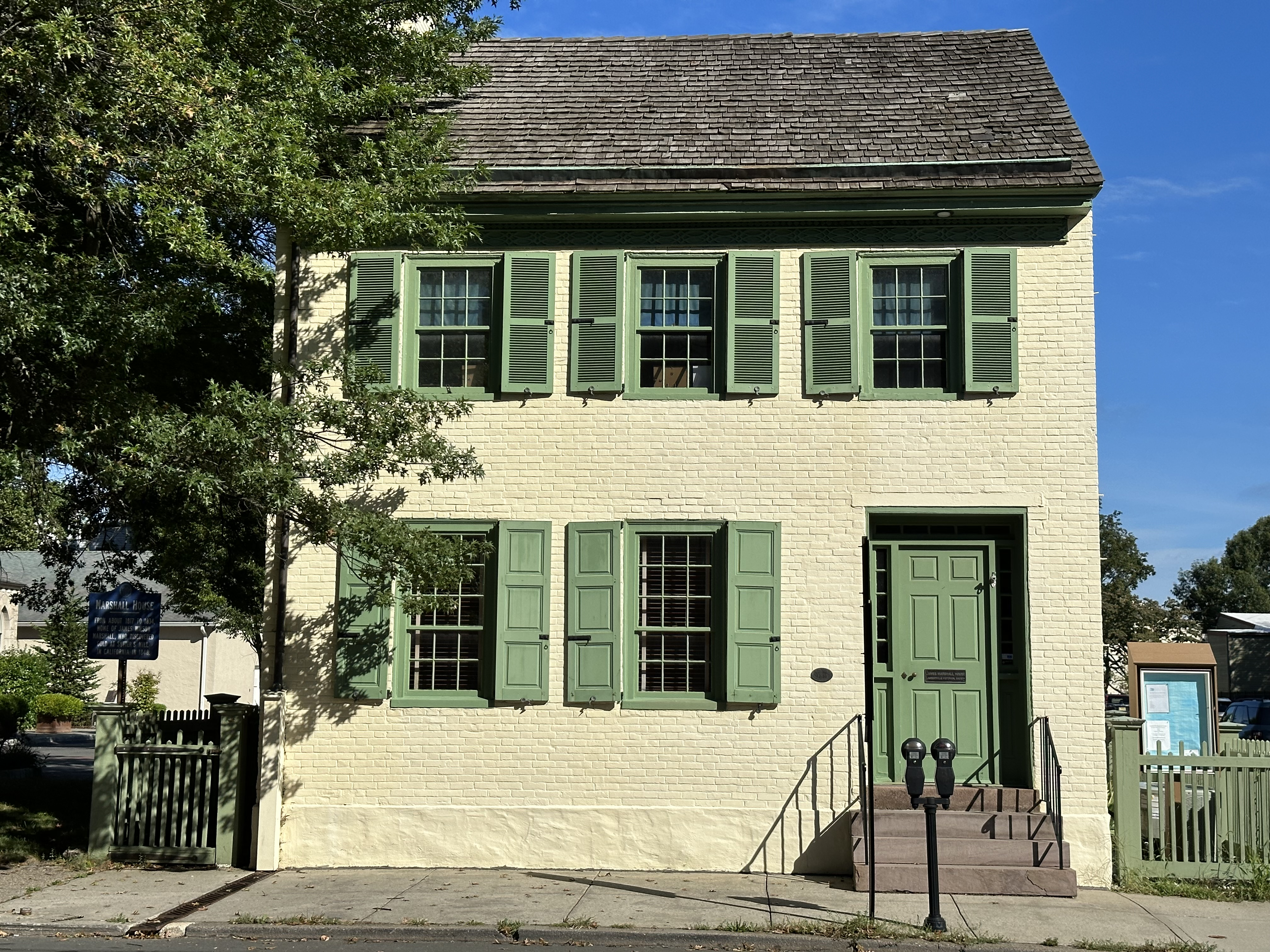
- Exterior of the James W. Marshall House in 2023

- Location within Hunterdon County, New Jersey Location within New Jersey Location within the United States
- Location: 60 Bridge Street, Lambertville, New Jersey
- Coordinates: 40°21′58″N 74°56′39″W
- Built: 1816
- NRHP reference No.: 70000386
- NJRHP No.: 1604

Significant dates
- Added to NRHP: December 18, 1970
- Designated NJRHP: September 11, 1970

The James W. Marshall House, located at 60 Bridge Street in the city of Lambertville in Hunterdon County, United States, was the boyhood home of James W. Marshall. Marshall's discovery of gold in the American River in California in January 1848 set the stage for the California Gold Rush. The house was added to the National Register of Historic Places on December 18, 1970, for its significance in architecture and history. It now serves as the headquarters for the Lambertville Historical Society, and is open to the public as an historic house museum.

== History ==
In 1816, Philip Marshall (James's father) moved his family from Hopewell, New Jersey to nearby Lambertville. He purchased 44 perches (approximately five acres) of land from Joseph Lambert for $300 and built a Federal-style brick home. The Marshall family resided in the house until 1834, when Philip died and his wife could no longer afford to live in it.

In 1882, the property was sold to nearby St. John's Roman Catholic Church for use as a convent for the Sisters of Mercy. The Sisters lived in the house and taught in a school that had been built as an addition. In 1964, the congregation of St. John's decided to build a new convent and school, and plans were made to demolish the house.

In an effort to save the house, Lambertville resident Alice Narducci reached an agreement with St. John's to deed the building to the New Jersey Department of Conservation and Economic Development. The state, in turn, leased the property to the Lambertville Historical Society. The kitchen and schoolhouse addition were removed, and a major restoration followed. The entire back wall of the house was rebuilt using material that matched the original as closely as possible. A similar restoration occurred within the house's interior. The house is decorated in the same time period as when the Marshalls resided in it.

== See also ==
- List of historical societies in New Jersey
- National Register of Historic Places listings in Hunterdon County, New Jersey
