= Jim Marshall (academic) =

New Zealand educational theorist (1937–2021)

- Born: James Derek Marshall; 20 January 1937
- Died: 2 June 2021 (aged 84); Takapuna, New Zealand

Academic background
- Education: University of Bristol

Academic work
- Discipline: Philosophy of education
- Institutions: University of Auckland

James Derek Marshall (20 January 1937 – 2 June 2021) was a New Zealand philosopher of education. He was known for his work on critical educational theory, including studies of punishment, neoliberalism, and the role of power in education.

== Biography ==
Marshall was educated at Waitaki Boys' High School. He served as an officer in the Royal New Zealand Navy and spent a period on exchange with the Royal Navy. After leaving the navy in 1963, he earned his Bachelor of Arts and PhD degrees at the University of Bristol. He was appointed to the staff of the University of Auckland in 1973, where he taught philosophy of education, rising to full professor. Upon his retirement he was accorded the title of emeritus professor. He co-founded and served as editor of ACCESS: Contemporary Issues in Education.

== Work ==
Marshall's research addressed topics such as the philosophy of punishment, the relationship between positivism and pragmatism, neoliberal education policy, and issues concerning Māori education. His scholarship engaged with the philosophy of Michel Foucault and helped establish Foucauldian approaches in New Zealand educational studies.

== Death and legacy ==
Marshall died in Takapuna on 2 June 2021, at the age of 84.

Marshall's writings remain cited in educational philosophy and theory. An obituary in Educational Philosophy and Theory described him as a leading figure in New Zealand philosophy of education and noted his support for broadening participation in the field.

== Selected works ==
- Marshall, J. D. (1990). Foucault and Education. Routledge.
- Marshall, J. D. (1996). Michel Foucault: Personal Autonomy and Education. Springer.
- Marshall, J. D. (2004). Philosophy of Education. Routledge.

== See also ==
- Philosophy of education
- Critical pedagogy
