= James Marshall (footballer, born 1890) =

Scottish footballer

Personal information
- Full name: James Hynd Marshall
- Date of birth: 1890
- Place of birth: Peterhead, Scotland
- Date of death: 1958 (aged 67–68)
- Place of death: Glasgow, Scotland
- Height: 5 ft 11 in (1.80 m)
- Position: Inside left

Youth career
- Vale of Grange

Senior career*
Years	Team	Apps	(Gls)
1911–1914	Partick Thistle	46	(22)
1914–1920	Bradford City	33	(12)
1916–1917	→ Ayr United (guest)	28	(20)
1917–1919	→ Partick Thistle (guest)	39	(22)
1920–1923	Oldham Athletic		
1923	Bangor City		
1924	Southport		
1924	Rotherham County		
1925	Lincoln City		
1925–1926	Queen of the South	26	(8)
- * Club domestic league appearances and goals

James Hynd Marshall (9 June 1890 – 1958) was a Scottish professional footballer who played as an inside left.

== Career ==
Born in Peterhead and raised in West Lothian, Marshall began his senior career with Partick Thistle, signing for Bradford City in June 1914. He made 33 Football League appearances for the West Yorkshire club either side of World War I, scoring 12 goals; he also played in four FA Cup matches, without scoring. After turning out for Partick and Ayr United as a guest player (the Scottish Football League continued during the conflict), Marshall returned to Bradford but departed Valley Parade in September 1920 to join Oldham Athletic. Following three seasons at Boundary Park he had short spells at Bangor City in Wales, at Southport, Rotherham County and Lincoln City in England and at Queen of the South back in Scotland.

== Sources ==
- Frost, Terry (1988). Bradford City A Complete Record 1903-1988. Breedon Books Sport. ISBN 0-907969-38-0.
