= James G. Marshall (politician) =

American legislator

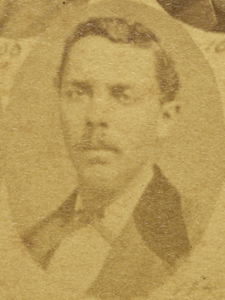

James G. Marshall (c. 1852–1891) was a farmer, teacher, court clerk, and state legislator in Mississippi. He represented Holmes County, Mississippi in the Mississippi House of Representatives in 1878 and 1879. In 1885 he was recommended for the position of minister to Liberia in Monrovia. He was described as "well educated, intelligent, good looking and well behaved."

== See also ==
- African American officeholders from the end of the Civil War until before 1900
