= Jim Marshall (Australian footballer) =

Australian rules footballer

Personal information
- Full name: James Charles Marshall
- Born: 16 January 1882; Fitzroy, Victoria
- Died: 21 August 1950 (aged 68); Caulfield, Victoria

Playing career^{1}
Years	Club	Games (Goals)
1904	St Kilda (VFL)	1 (0)
1904	North Melbourne (VFA)	5 (7)
- ^{1} Playing statistics correct to the end of 1904.

James Charles Marshall (16 January 1882 – 21 August 1950) was an Australian rules footballer who played with St Kilda in the Victorian Football League (VFL).

== Family ==
The son of George Grasby Marshall (1844–1883), and Maria Anne Marshall (-1915), née Cooper, James Charles Marshall was born in Fitzroy, Victoria on 16 January 1882.

He married Janet Eliza Tonkin (-1948) in 1916; they had three children.

== Football ==
=== St Kilda (VFL) ===
Recruited from South Melbourne Juniors, he played one match for the St Kilda First XVIII, against Melbourne, at the Junction Oval on 7 May 1904.

=== North Melbourne (VFA) ===
Cleared from St Kilda in June 1904, he played five matches for North Melbourne in the VFA.

== Death ==
He died at the Caulfield Convalescent Hospital on 21 August 1950.
