= Red Mill (Clinton, New Jersey) =

- David McKinney Mill
- U.S. National Register of Historic Places
- U.S. Historic district – Contributing property
- New Jersey Register of Historic Places
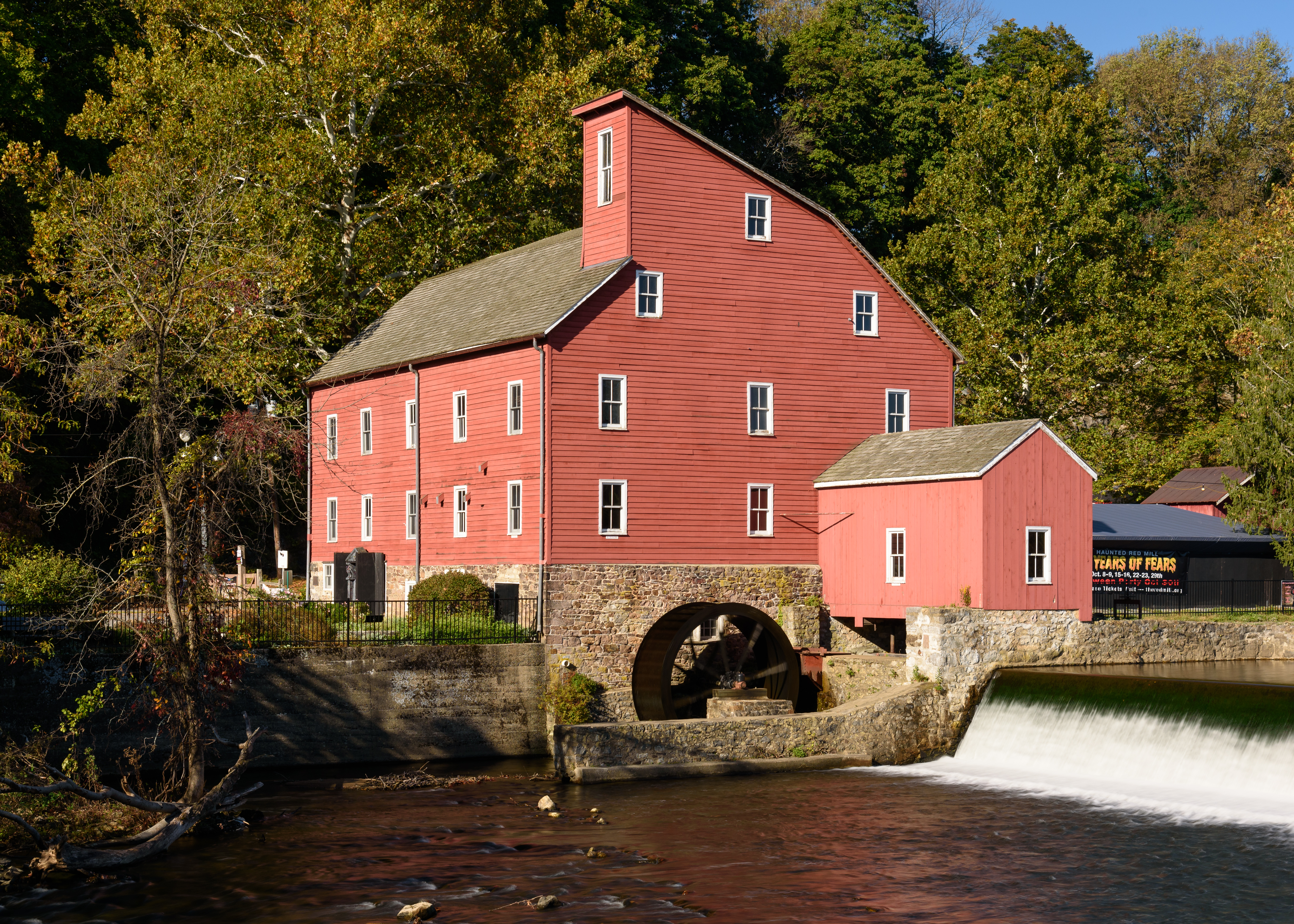
- The Red Mill in 2021

- Location within Hunterdon County, New Jersey Location within New Jersey Location within the United States
- Location: 56 Main Street; Clinton, New Jersey
- Coordinates: 40°38′10″N 74°54′46″W
- Area: 5.9 acres (2.4 ha)
- Built: c. 1810
- Part of: Clinton Historic District (ID95001101)
- NRHP reference No.: 74001162
- NJRHP No.: 1566

Significant dates
- Added to NRHP: January 8, 1974
- Designated CP: September 28, 1995
- Designated NJRHP: September 18, 1973

The Red Mill is a 4-story grist mill located along the South Branch Raritan River at 56 Main Street in Clinton, New Jersey. It was built c. 1810 as an industrial mill. It has served several roles, including a wool processing plant, a peach basket factory, and a textile mill. Historically known as the David McKinney Mill, it was added to the National Register of Historic Places on January 8, 1974 for its significance in agriculture and commerce. In 1995, it was also listed as a contributing property of the Clinton Historic District. It is now part of the Red Mill Museum Village, an open-air museum previously known as the Clinton Historical Museum.

== History ==
The site property was owned by David McKinney in 1761. The Red Mill was built by Ralph Hunt, c. 1810, on land he had inherited from his father, Daniel, who had been an early landowner in Clinton and built the Stone Mill across the river in 1763 (now known as the Hunterdon Art Museum). It was in use as a wool processing plant for the first few years, although by 1820, the wool business had failed in the downturn for cloth. Eventually, Hunt's business failed, and he lost hundreds of acres on both sides of the river.

The mill was purchased in 1960 by the Red Mill Five, led by local artist James R. Marsh and Monroe F. DeMott. Marsh also bought the adjoining M. C. Mulligan & Sons Quarry in 1964 and donated it to the Clinton Historical Museum, which fully opened in 1965. The museum is now known as the Red Mill Museum Village.

== Gallery ==
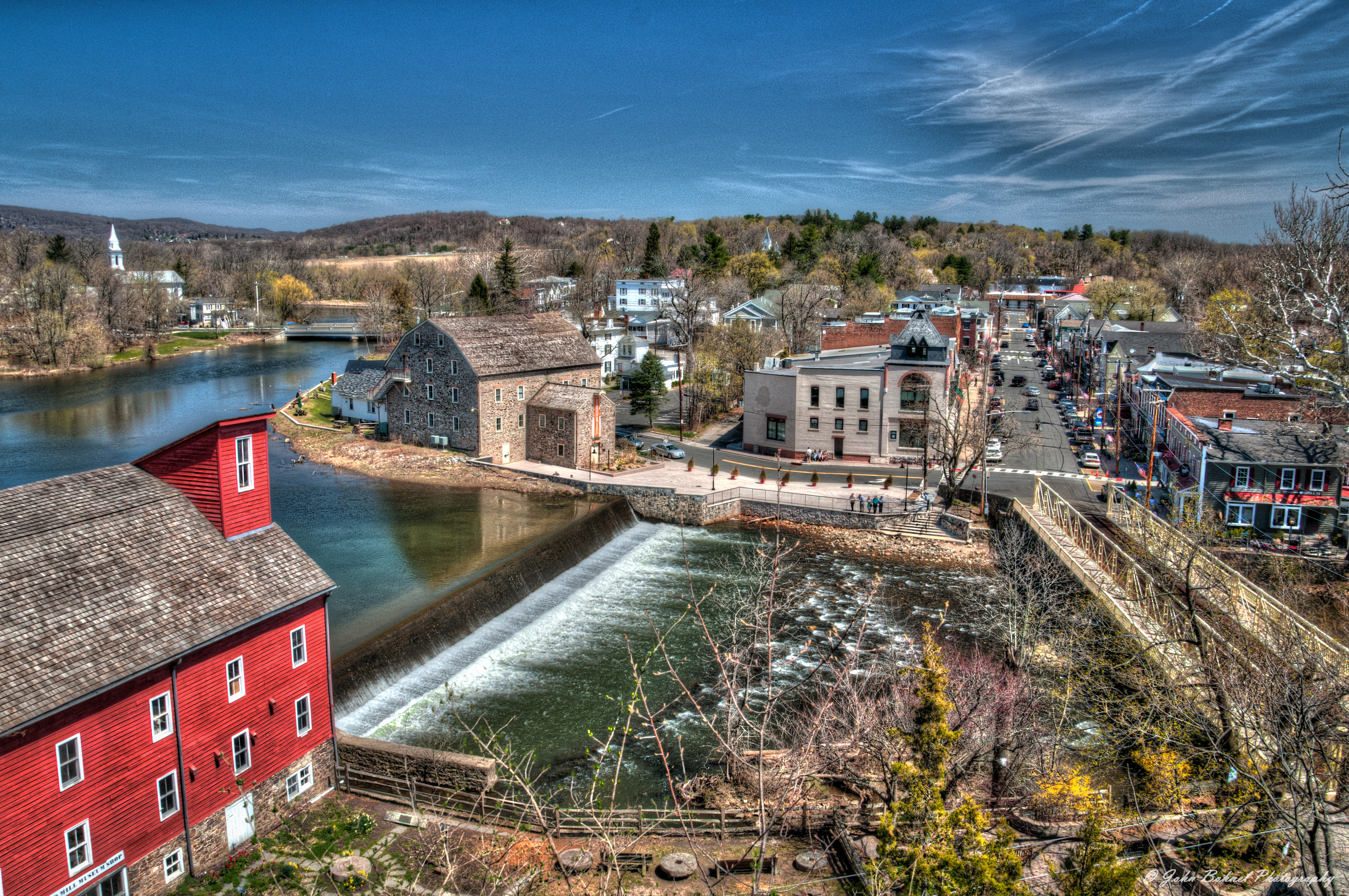
The Red Mill as seen from the top of the cliff

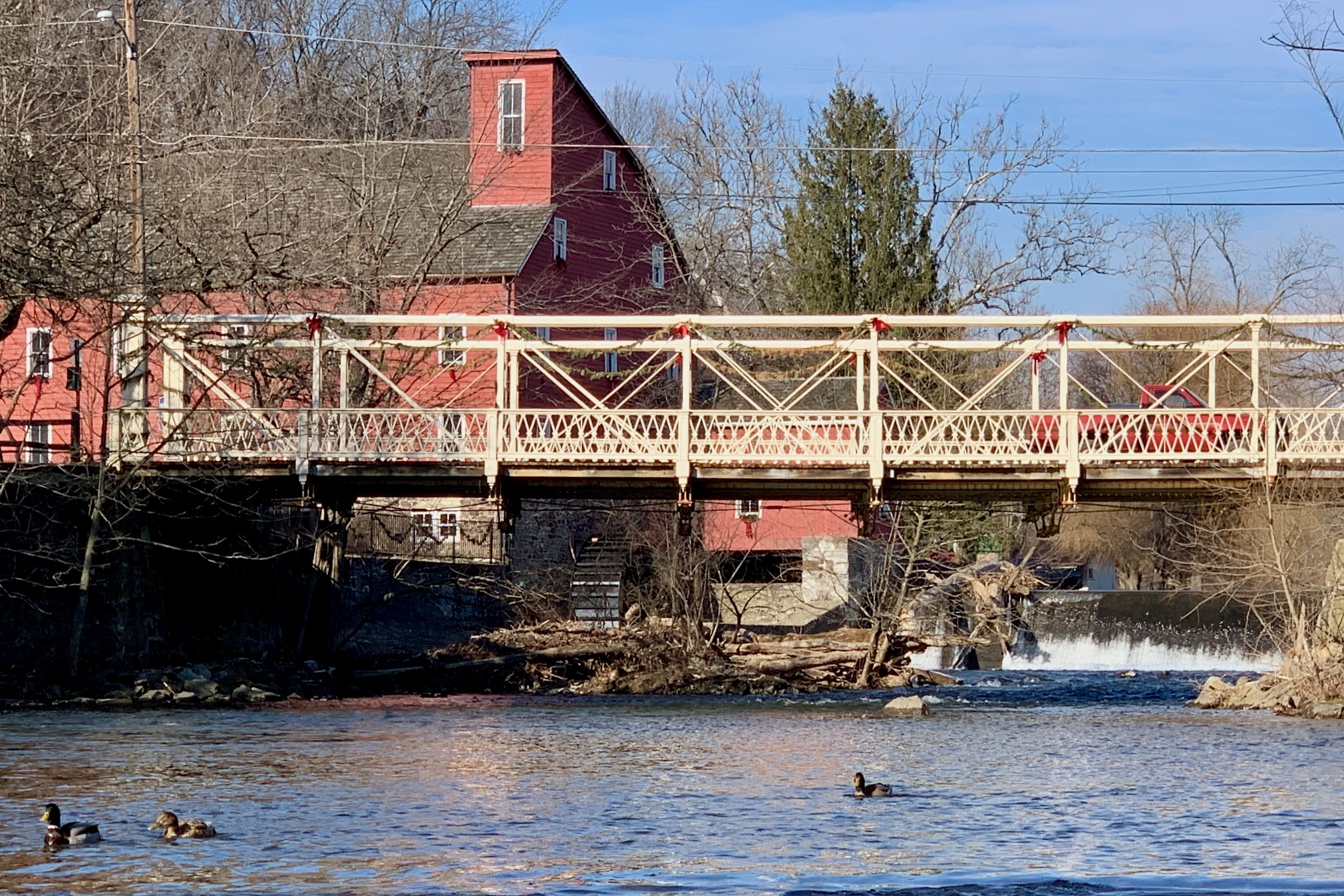
Main Street Bridge crossing the South Branch Raritan River by the Red Mill

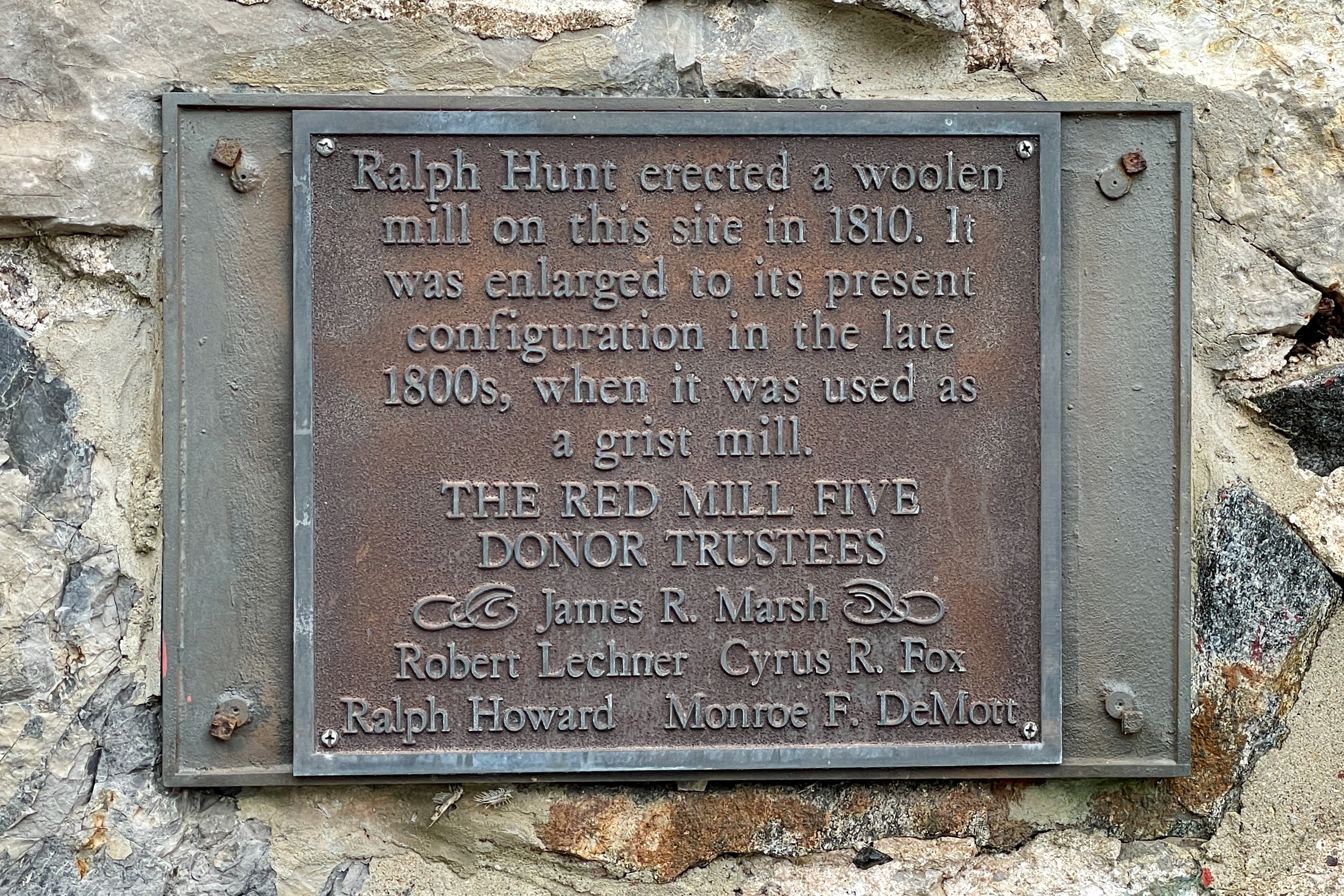
Historical information plaque by the Red Mill Five Donor Trustees
