= Anne Steele Marsh =

American painter (1901–1995)

- Born: Anne Gould Steele; September 7, 1901; Nutley, New Jersey, US
- Died: December 5, 1995 (aged 94); Hunterdon County, New Jersey, US
- Spouse: James Randall Marsh

Anne Steele Marsh (1901–1995) was an American painter and printmaker whose watercolors, oil paintings, and wood engravings were widely exhibited and drew critical praise. She was also a noted educator and arts administrator.

== Early life and training ==
In the rear gallery [at Contemporary Arts] some watercolors by Anne Steele Marsh show appreciation of the character of the medium, not only in their easy fluency of gay color but in their unpretentious simplicity and freedom.

— Margaret Breuning, critic for the New York Post, in a review published April 6, 1935.

Marsh attended private schools as a child. In the years following the end of World War I she studied as a design major in the School of Art at Cooper Union and later studied tapestry, weaving, and occupational therapy at one of the schools run by the YWCA of New York. (Note: Marsh's daughter said she studied at the "YMCA Art School," but there is no record of such a school in the New York metropolitan region. It is more likely that Marsh studied at the Ballard School run by the YWCA of New York. That school was founded by Georgianna Ballard in 1870 to provide vocational training for women. If offered many classes to help prepare its students for occupations in the city.) Having completed those studies she worked for the next four years, until 1925, as an instructor of occupational therapy.

== Career in art ==
From 1935 to 1940 Marsh showed watercolors, oil paintings, and wood engravings in group exhibitions held at commercial galleries, including the Morton Montrose, and Contemporary Arts Galleries; and the Art Mart; (Note: Begun in October 1935 the Art Mart was a Manhattan commercial gallery offering works by contemporary American artists at "budget prices.") as well as in shows staged by the National Association of Women Painters and Sculptors in its Argent Galleries. (Note: There are news accounts of watercolors by Marsh in seven group exhibitions held at the Morton Gallery (1936, 1937, 1938, 1939), two at the Montrose Gallery (1937), four at Contemporary Arts (1935, 1936), one at the Art Mart (1936), and two at Argent Galleries (1935, 1936).) In April 1935 she had a solo exhibition at Contemporary Arts Galleries in Manhattan. (Note: New York's Contemporary Arts Gallery opened in 1929 to provide exhibitions for little-known contemporary artists. It was the first gallery to show work by Mark Tobey, Mark Rothko, Louis Schanker, Stanley Twardowicz, and other notable artists. The gallery was founded and directed by Emily Francis.) She showed at the World's Fair held in New York in 1939 and, during the 1940s, showed watercolors, paintings, and prints in group exhibitions in diverse settings, including the 1940 Venice Biennale, Associated Artists of New Jersey, New York Society of Women Artists, (Note: The New York Society of Women Artists was founded in 1925 as an alternative to the National Association of Women Painters and Sculptors (which was believed to be too traditional and academic). It aimed to show art that was innovative and not overly feminine. Membership was originally limited to thirty but later raised to fifty. Each member was allotted the same amount of space in its exhibitions. Its first president was Marguerite Zorach. The founding members included Adelaide Lawson, Agnes Weinrich, Anne Goldthwaite, Blanche Lazzell, Henrietta Shore, Louise Upton Brumback, Margaret Wendell Huntington, Marjorie Organ, and Sonia Gordon Brown.) Pennsylvania Academy of Fine Arts, and National Academy of Design.

Beginning in the mid-1950s Marsh devoted more time to work as an arts administrator, helping to transform an old grist mill near her home into an arts center and managing its exhibitions. In 1956 she chaired the first of an annual series of print exhibitions at the center, a tradition that would continue for the next 35 years.

Over the course of her thirty-year career Marsh received awards from many art organizations including the New Jersey State Museum, Pen & Brush Club of New York, Philadelphia Print Club, Montclair Art Museum, and the National Association of Women Artists. Her work can be found in the permanent collections of Metropolitan Museum of Art, Philadelphia Art Museum, Brooklyn Museum, New Jersey State Museum and the Museum of Modern Art, Library of Congress, and New York Public Library.

=== Artistic style and critical reception ===
Anne Steele Marsh, Morning at the Circus, watercolor on paper, about 1936, 21 1/2 x 29 1/2 inches

Anne Steele Marsh, Holland Tunnel, wood engraving, 1930, 9 x 12 inches

Anne Steele Marsh, Intermission, wood engraving, 1951, 6 x 9 inches

Anne Steele Marsh, In the Corner, oil on masonite, about 1962, 9 1/2 x 24 inches

Marsh's style was realist. Her Watercolors, oil paintings, and wood engravings all drew critical notice. In 1935, Margaret Breuning, critic for the New York Post said her watercolors showed an "appreciation of the character of the medium, not only in their easy fluency of gay color but in their unpretentious simplicity and freedom." At the same time Howard Devree of The New York Times wrote that her paintings resembled those of Hopper, Burchfield and Sanford Ross, but added that she was "preoccupied with the romantic, exciting, poetic and beautiful values in the commonplace" and said she captured them "sometimes rather dazzlingly—with a joyous brush." Reviewing a group show held in 1936 at the Art Mart, Howard Devree wrote that Marsh's "large and pleasing "Morning at the Circus" (shown at right) in particular deserves to be noticed by the visitor." A Times review published in 1937 noted that she applied "wash smoothly and with clear definition." The author said, "her color is pleasing and her work continues to gain facility." That critic also called attention to a wood engraving called "Holland Tunnel" that Marsh had made in 1930, saying it was one of her more interesting works on paper. This print, shown at left, illustrates her early style. In 1943, reporting on a group show at the Studio Gallery, (Note: The Studio Gallery at Fifth Avenue and Fifteenth Street was opened at the end of 1943. It specialized shows of paintings, watercolors, and monotypes by women artists.) the critic for the Brooklyn Daily Eagle, A. Z. Kreuze, said Marsh had a "sound facility" in wood engraving and praised one of her prints for its well managed distribution of light. In reviewing a group show held by the New York Society of Women Artists ten years later, Devree called attention to a wood engraving called "Intermission" (shown at right). In 1966 the New Jersey State Museum gave Marsh a purchase award for "In the Corner," an oil painting of about 1962 (shown at left). A critic noted at the time that she competed against "far more celebrated names" in winning the award. In 1995, looking back on her artistic career, a critic said "her wood engravings combine powerful design with painstakingly refined execution."

== Career as educator ==
After completing study at the YMCA, Marsh taught occupational therapy four years during the early 1920s. From 1938 to 1945 she was an art instructor at Buxton Country Day School in Short Hills, New Jersey, and at Newark School of Fine and Industrial Arts.

== Career as administrator ==
In 1941 Marsh founded and became first president of Associated Artists of New Jersey Limited to a membership of fifty, the group staged exhibitions in galleries and museums and sponsored public forums.

In 1952 Marsh and her husband helped to create a center for arts and crafts in Clinton, New Jersey. They bought and converted a former a grist mill into exhibition space, studios, and a shop. Marsh organized exhibitions and managed the gallery at the center. In 1956 she began a series of annual print exhibitions and started a program to purchase prints for what would later become known as the Anne Steele Marsh Collection. She also set up and ran a commercial gallery, called the Graphics Room, in the center.

During her career she served as trustee of American Association of Museums and the New Jersey State Museum and was a board member of New York Society of Women Artists, Society of American Graphic Artists, and other arts organizations. For her work she received a commendation from the New Jersey legislature.

== Personal life and family ==
Born on September 7, 1901, Marsh was the daughter of the well-known illustrator Frederic Dorr Steele and his wife Mary Thyng Steele (known as Polly). She had two siblings, Robert G. Steele and Zulma R. Steel. In 1925 she married James Randall Marsh. After the wedding the couple moved to Essex Fells, New Jersey. In 1948 they bought a farm in Pittstown, New Jersey. They converted its barn to a studio, where Anne Steele Marsh would work, and music room, where the family would host Sunday afternoon chamber music concerts.

James R. Marsh was the son of the illustrator and muralist Frederick Dana Marsh and his wife, the miniaturist, Alice Randall Marsh. The artist Reginald Marsh was his brother. He was an artist in his own right but is better known as a designer and manufacturer of decorative wrought iron. Established in 1926, his firm, the James R. Marsh Company, made small products like sconces and table lamps, as well as large ones like the entrance gate at Sarah Lawrence College. He also was Anne Steele Marsh's partner in transforming the Clinton gristmill into the Hunterdon Art Center, now called the Hunterdon Art Museum. Starting in 1960, he helped to establish the Clinton Historical Museum, now known as the Red Mill Museum Village.

Anne Steele Marsh and James R. Marsh had two sons, Reginald Steele Marsh (born 1926) and Peter Marsh (born 1932). They had one daughter Janet B. Marsh (born 1930). Peter Marsh was a professional violinist. Janet Marsh (Janet Marsh Hunt after her marriage) directed the Coryell Art Gallery in Lambertville, New Jersey.

Anne Steele Marsh died on December 5, 1995, at the Hunterdon Care Center in Flemington.
