= Terry R. McGuire =

American geneticist

- Born: Terry Russell McGuire
- Education: Ohio State University; University of Illinois at Urbana–Champaign
- Known for: Science education
- Spouse: Jeannette Haviland-Jones
- Scientific career
- Fields: Behavioral genetics
- Institutions: Rutgers University
- Thesis: Behavior-Genetic Analysis of Phormia Regina: Conditioning, Central Excitatory State, and Selection (1978)
- Doctoral advisor: Jerry Hirsch

Terry Russell McGuire was professor and Vice Chair of the Department of Genetics at Rutgers University. His research has been in the fields of Mendelian, behavioral, and ecological genetics. He has also been involved in science education through the National Center for Science & Civic Engagement (NCSCE), of which he has been a senior fellow since 2008. He has also been a senior associate and core faculty member of Science Education for New Civic Engagements and Responsibilities (SENCER), the NCSCE's primary initiative, since 2004. In 2007, Rutgers appointed him a Presidential Carnegie Academy for the Scholarship of Teaching and Learning Fellow. He has taught at Rutgers since 1979. As of 2012, he lived in Clinton, New Jersey with his wife, Jeannette Haviland-Jones, a Rutgers psychology professor. He retired from teaching at Rutgers at the end of the spring 2014 semester.
