= M. C. Mulligan & Sons Quarry =

- U.S. National Register of Historic Places
- U.S. Historic district
- U.S. Historic district – Contributing property
- New Jersey Register of Historic Places
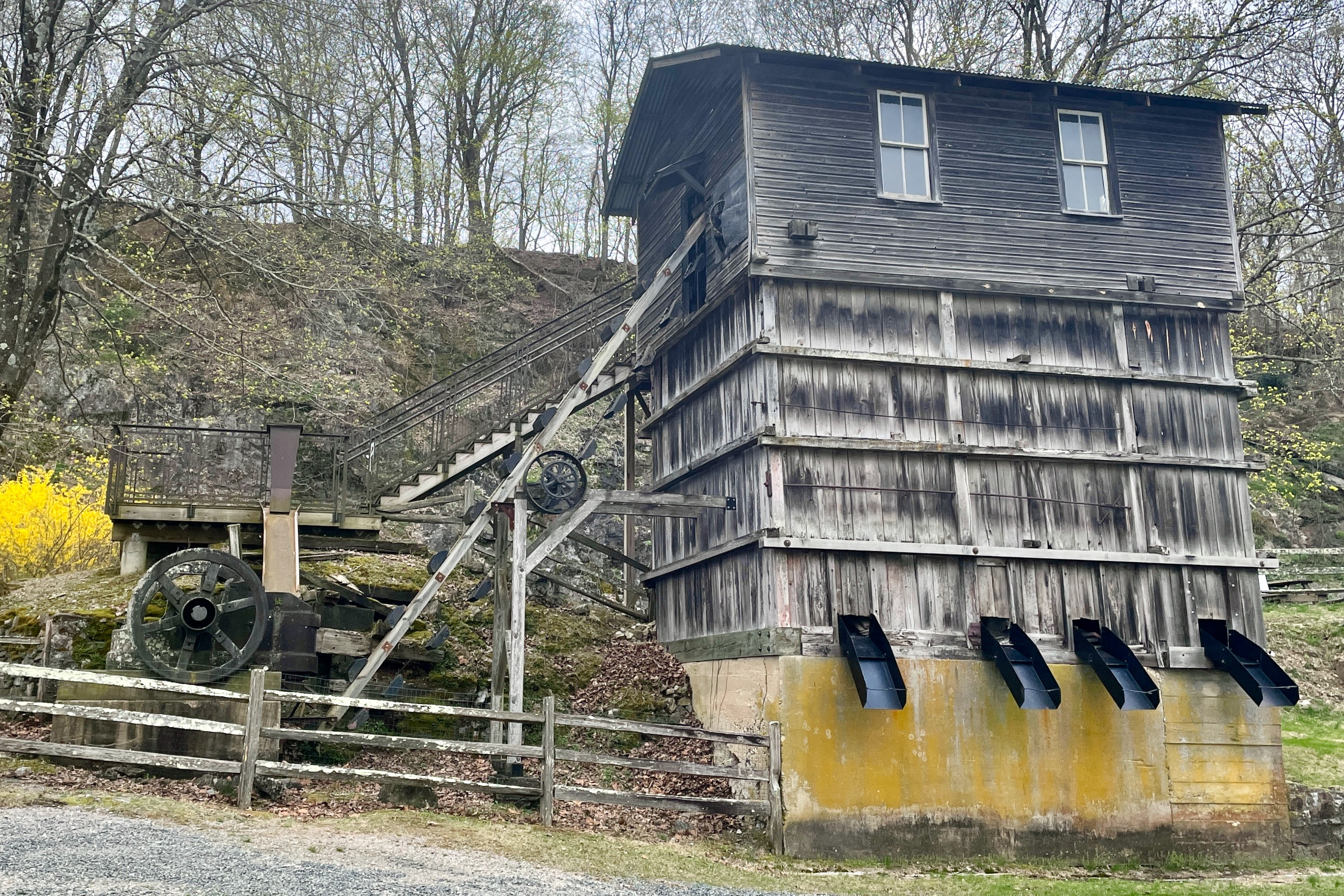
- Crusher and Screen House

- Location within Hunterdon County, New Jersey Location within New Jersey Location within the United States
- Location: 56 Main Street, Clinton, New Jersey
- Coordinates: 40°38′12″N 74°54′49″W
- Area: 8.8 acres (3.6 ha)
- Architectural style: 19th and 20th-c. industrial
- Part of: Clinton Historic District (ID95001101)
- NRHP reference No.: 94001010
- NJRHP No.: 1569

Significant dates
- Added to NRHP: August 30, 1994
- Designated CP: September 28, 1995
- Designated NJRHP: June 28, 1994

The M. C. Mulligan & Sons Quarry is a 8.8-acre (3.6 ha) historic district encompassing a former limestone quarry located at 56 Main Street in the town of Clinton in Hunterdon County, New Jersey. It was added to the National Register of Historic Places on August 30, 1994, for its significance in agriculture, commerce, and industry. The listing includes six contributing buildings, two contributing structures, a contributing object, and a contributing site. In 1995, it was also listed as part of the Clinton Historic District. The quarry is now in the Red Mill Museum Village, an open-air museum.

== History ==
Three Irish immigrant brothers, Francis, Patrick and Terrence Mulligan, started a quarry in 1844 and purchased an adjacent quarry in 1848. They sold it to J. P. Huffman in 1855, who then sold it to George Gulick. In 1858, James Mulligan leased the quarry. After his death in 1862, his son Michael C. Mulligan inherited it. Michael expanded the quarry business, M. C. Mulligan & Sons, by providing building stone. The quarry provided the building materials needed for the reconstruction of downtown Clinton after the Great Fire of 1891. After Michael died in 1916, the property was held in trust by his sons, James S. and Michael J. Mulligan. The quarry continued operation under family ownership until 1964. That year, it was purchased by local artist James Randall Marsh who donated it to the Clinton Historical Museum, now known as the Red Mill Museum Village.

== Description ==
The Quarry Office was built sometime before 1903 and has been moved three times, the last in 1979. The Crusher and Screen House was built c. 1912.

== Geology ==
The quarry is in the southern part of the Jutland klippe and north of the Newark Basin. In the 1950s, uranium was detected in fractured dolomite limestone. In 1986, several nearby houses were found to have high levels of radon.

== Gallery ==
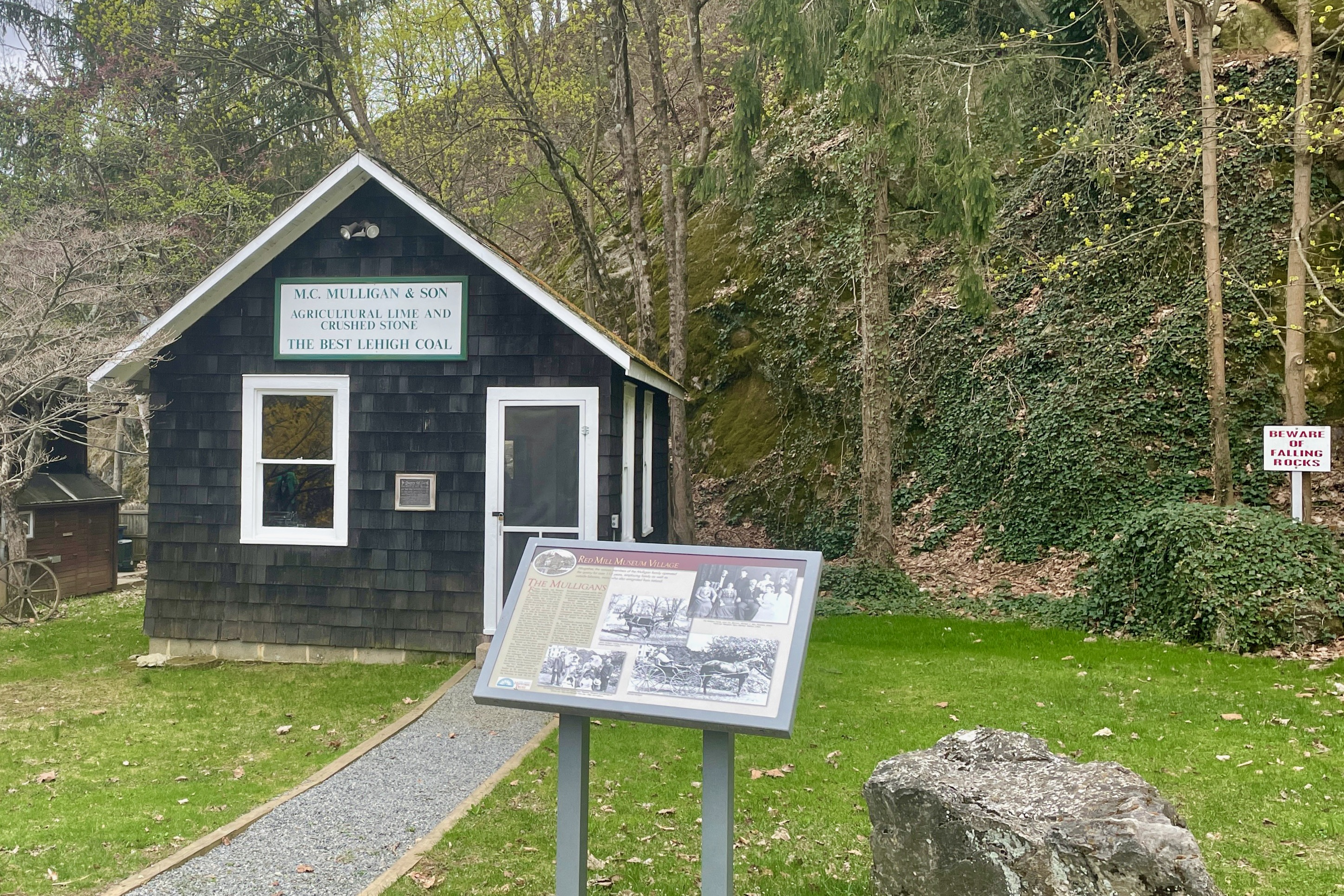
Quarry Office

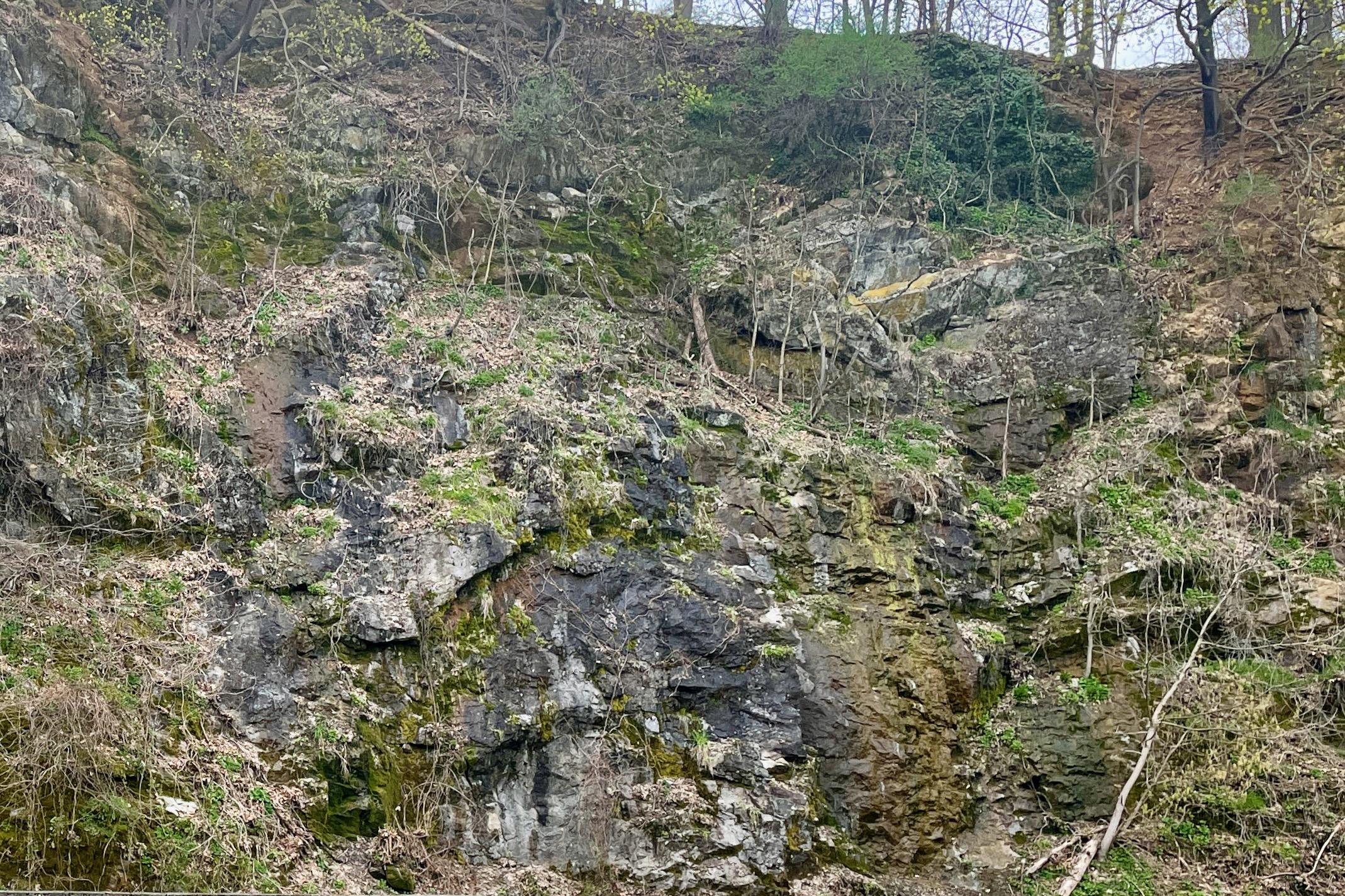
Quarry cliff face with exposed limestone

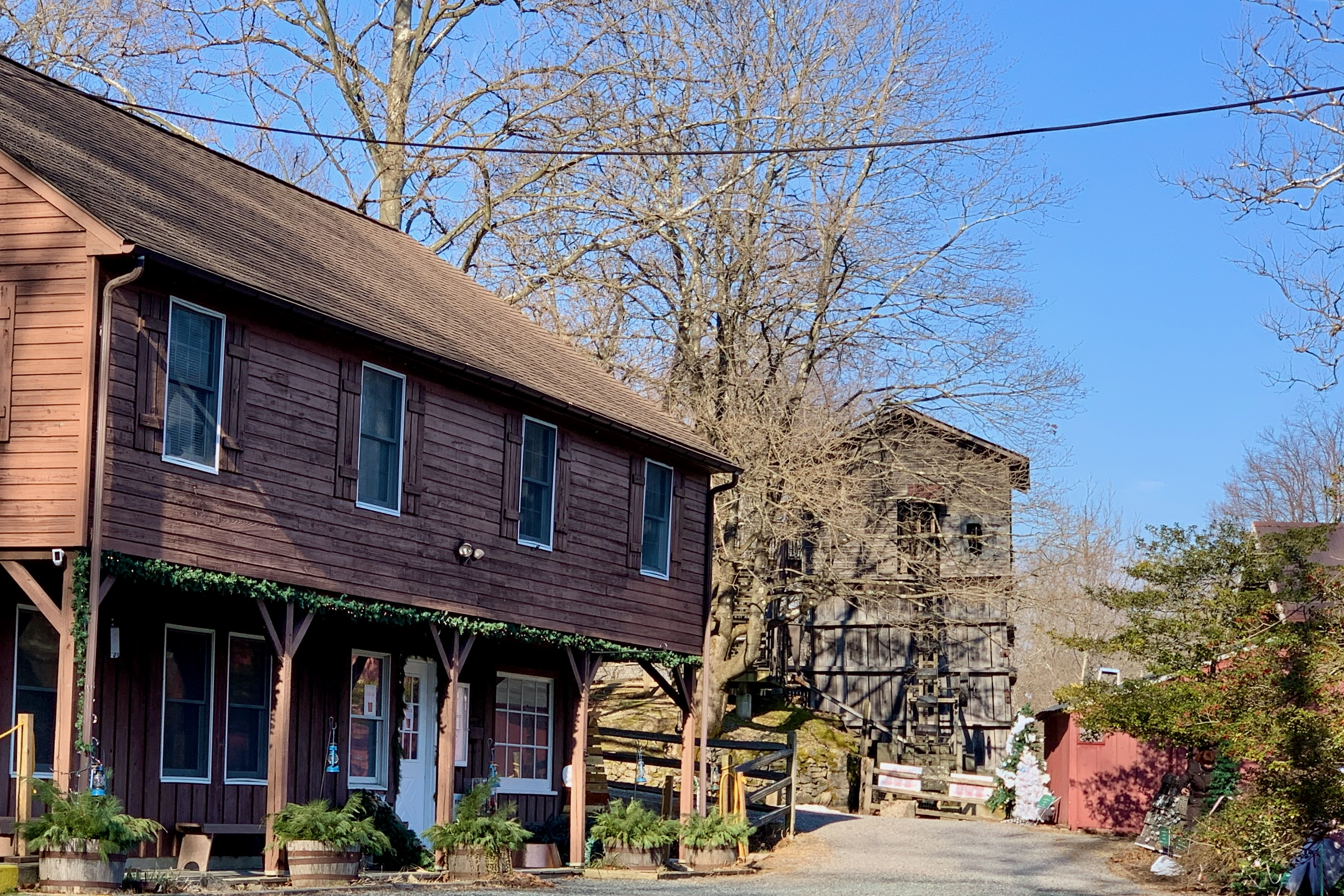
Red Mill Museum Village office and quarry buildings
