= Hunterdon Art Museum =

Museum in Clinton, New Jersey

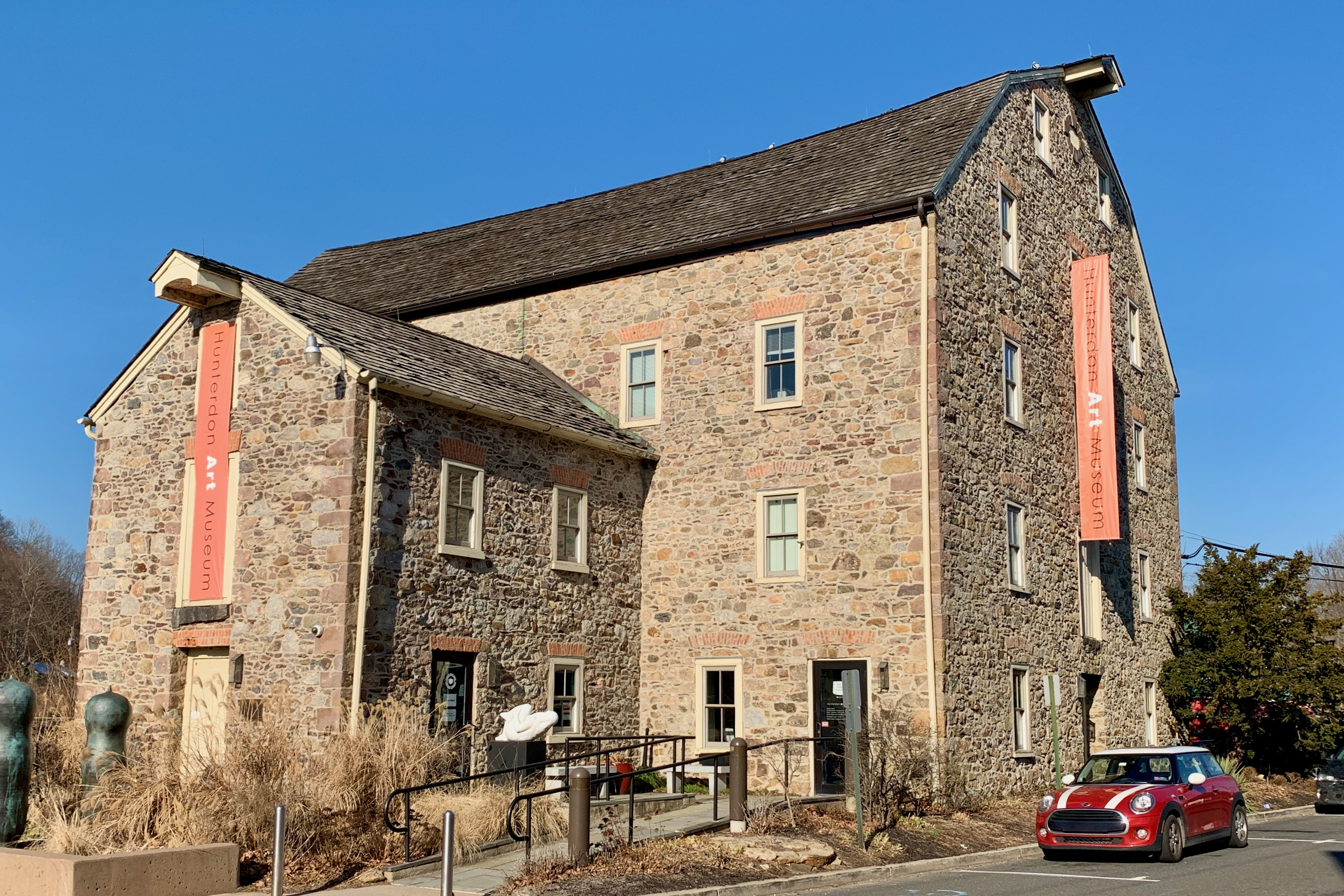
- Hunterdon Art Museum in historic Stone Mill

- Location within Hunterdon County, New Jersey Location within New Jersey Location within the United States
- Established: 1952
- Location: 7 Lower Center Street; Clinton, New Jersey
- Coordinates: 40°38′11″N 74°54′43″W
- Type: Art Museum
- Executive director: Marjorie Frankel Nathanson
- President: Timothy J. Fraser
- Website: hunterdonartmuseum.org

The Hunterdon Art Museum, previously known as the Hunterdon Art Center and the Hunterdon Museum of Art, is located in a historic stone mill at 7 Lower Center Street in Clinton, New Jersey. It was founded in 1952 when it purchased Dunham's Mill, the Stone Mill, for use as an art museum. The museum emphasizes that it is a "center for art, craft & design" and presents exhibitions featuring both local and national artists. The stone mill was added to the National Register of Historic Places in 1982 for its significance in commerce and industry.

== History ==
In 1952, the American artists James Randall Marsh and Anne Steele Marsh of Pittstown, helped raise funds to purchase Dunham's Mill. The historic character of the mill was preserved by the architect, William M. Hunt, as it was converted into a museum. After James Marsh's death in 1966, Otto Siegmund became president of the museum. With funding from the New Jersey State Council on the Arts, Ann Douglass was hired as the first executive director in 1970. The current president of the board of trustees is Timothy J. Fraser and the current executive director is Marjorie Frankel Nathanson.

== Collection ==
Artists represented in the collection of prints include Mark di Suvero, Philip Guston, Alex Katz, and Ad Reinhardt. Sculptors represented at the museum include Tom Otterness and Toshiko Takaezu.

== Exhibitions ==
The exhibition "Outsider Art by Southern Folks" in 1994 focused on folk art and included two works by Herbert Singleton. In early 2002, the works of the sculptor Jim Toia were displayed in an exhibition entitled "Groundwork" and featuring mushrooms as both source and subject. Later in the year, the museum celebrated its anniversary with an exhibition entitled "50 Years: The History of the Hunterdon Museum of Art". In The New York Times, art critic William Zimmer described it as the "most charming and picturesque" museum in the state. The 2003 exhibition "Extreme Landscape" featured paintings of volcanic eruptions by Diane Burko and lithographs of a mountain landscape by James Lavadour. All three floors of the museum were used to display the works of Toshiko Takaezu, who lives in nearby Quakertown, in 2006. The show included over fifty of her painted abstract vessels, in either clay or porcelain.

== See also ==
- List of museums in New Jersey
