= James Randall Marsh =

American artist

- Born: 1896; Paris, France
- Died: January 20, 1966 (aged 69); Flemington, New Jersey
- Known for: Design
- Movement: Arts and Crafts
- Spouse: Anne Steele (m. 1925)

James Randall Marsh (1896–1966) was an American artist and the husband of Anne Steele Marsh.

== Biography ==
Marsh was born in 1896 in Paris, France. He was the son of Frederick Dana Marsh and Alice Randall Marsh. He was the brother of the painter Reginald Marsh.

He married Anne Steele in 1925 and the couple settled in Essex Fells, New Jersey. There Marsh set up a metal forge which he used to create industrial and residential lighting fixtures. In 1948, the Marshes relocated to Pittstown, New Jersey where James continued operating a forge, expanding the operation to include decorative metal work. His work was mainly in the American Arts and Craft style.

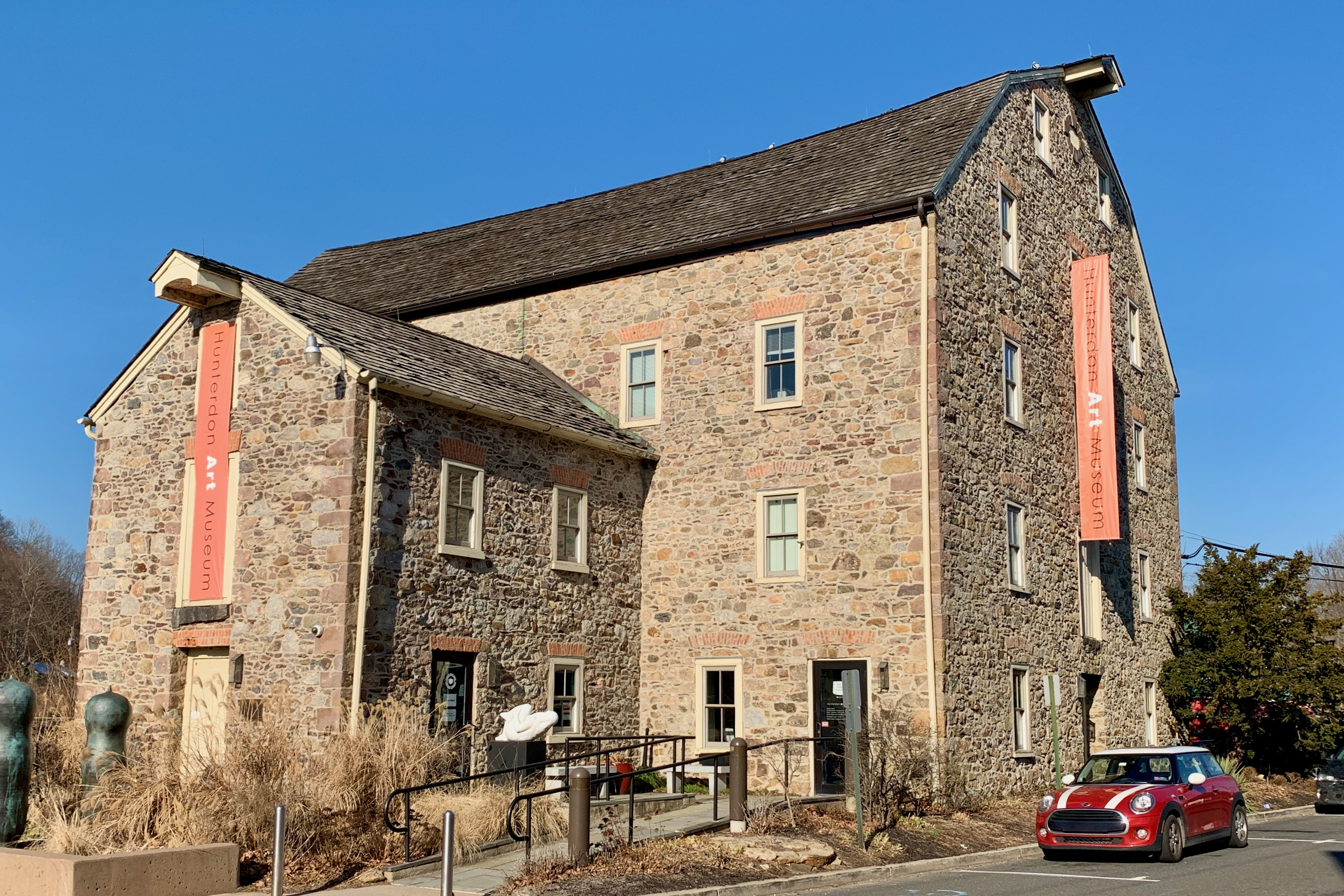
Hunterdon Art Museum in Clinton, New Jersey

In 1952, Marsh was instrumental in establishing the Hunterdon Art Museum. When an 1836 stone mill became available for sale, Marsh and his neighbors decided to turn it into an art center, with Marsh providing most of the purchase price. The museum, with workshops, is still in operation and the building is listed as Dunham's Mill on the National Register of Historic Places listings in Hunterdon County, New Jersey.

In 1964, he purchased the M. C. Mulligan & Sons Quarry, also listed on the NRHP, and donated it to the Clinton Historical Museum, now known as the Red Mill Museum Village. On October 9, 1965, the James Randall Marsh Historical Park was dedicated at the museum.

Marsh died on January 20, 1966, in Flemington.
