= Red Mill Museum Village =

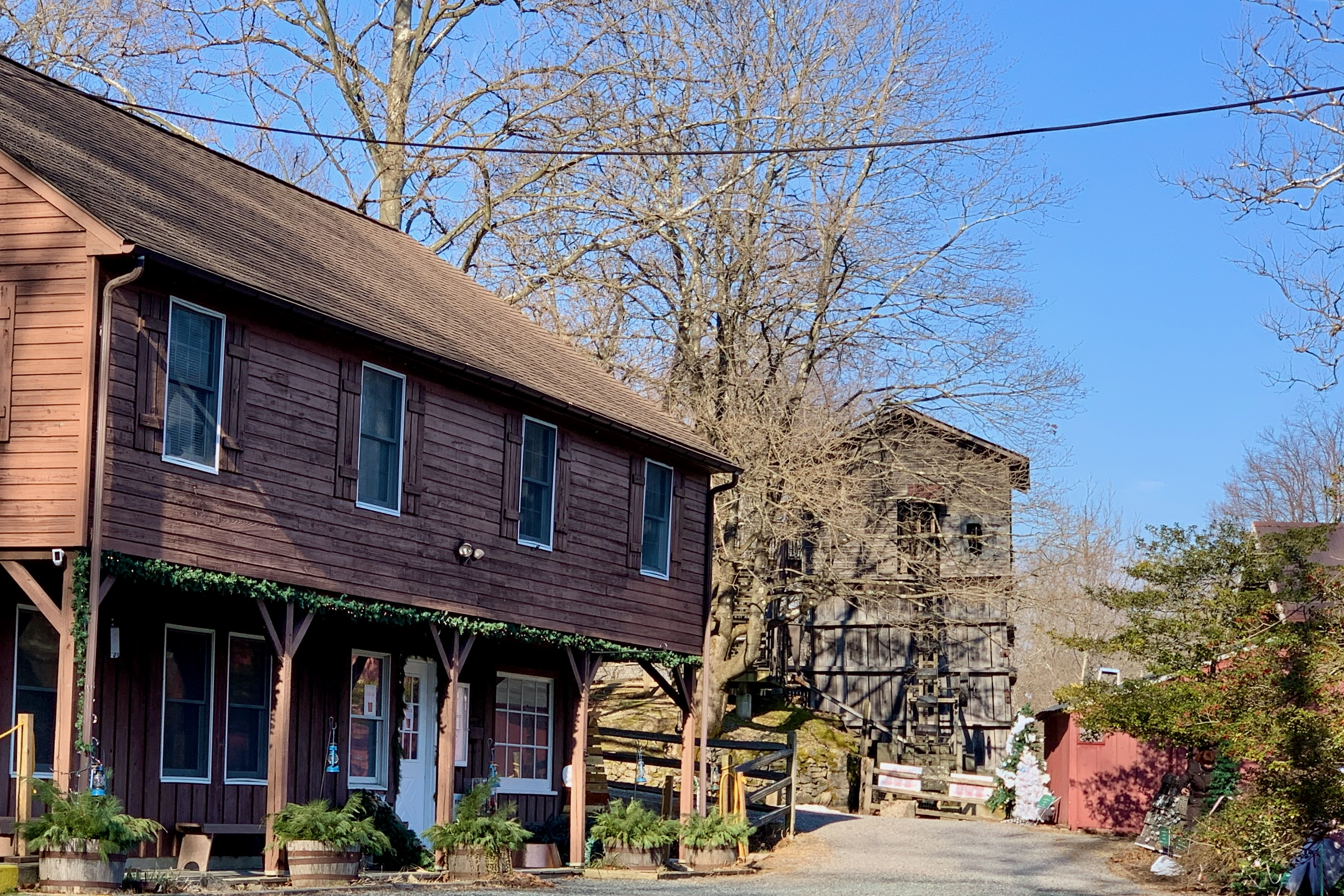
- Red Mill Museum Village office and quarry buildings

- Location within Hunterdon County, New Jersey Location within New Jersey Location within the United States
- Location: 56 Main Street; Clinton, New Jersey
- Coordinates: 40°38′11″N 74°54′48″W
- Website: theredmill.org

The Red Mill Museum Village, historically known as the Clinton Historical Museum, is an open-air museum located along the South Branch Raritan River at 56 Main Street in Clinton, New Jersey. It includes the historic Red Mill and the adjacent M. C. Mulligan & Sons Quarry. The museum is a private, non-profit organization, whose mission is to display the social, agricultural, and industrial heritage of Hunterdon County. The 10 acres (4.0 ha) site has 12 historic buildings. Both the mill and the quarry are listed on the National Register of Historic Places and are part of the Clinton Historic District.

== History ==
Starting in 1960, five local residents, known as the Red Mill Five, began to acquire property to form the museum. They were Monroe F. DeMott, Cyrus R. Fox, Ralph Howard, Robert Lechner, and the artist James R. Marsh. They acquired the Red Mill for $15,000. The museum opened to the public in 1963. Marsh bought the adjoining quarry in 1964 and donated it to the museum. The full museum then opened in 1965. On October 9, 1965, the James Randall Marsh Historical Park was dedicated at the museum. The Bunker Hill School House, built c. 1861, was moved here in 1974 from Alexandria Township.

== Events ==
The largest annual event held at the museum is the Winter Village at the Red Mill Museum, founded by Kim and Kevin Kraemer of Marketspace Vendor Events. This holiday shopping event, which hosts 50 vendors, food trucks, and the Festival of Trees, opens on Black Friday and continues through the following weekend.

The museum also has been the site for the annual Black Potatoe Music Festival, founded by Matt Angus.

== Gallery ==
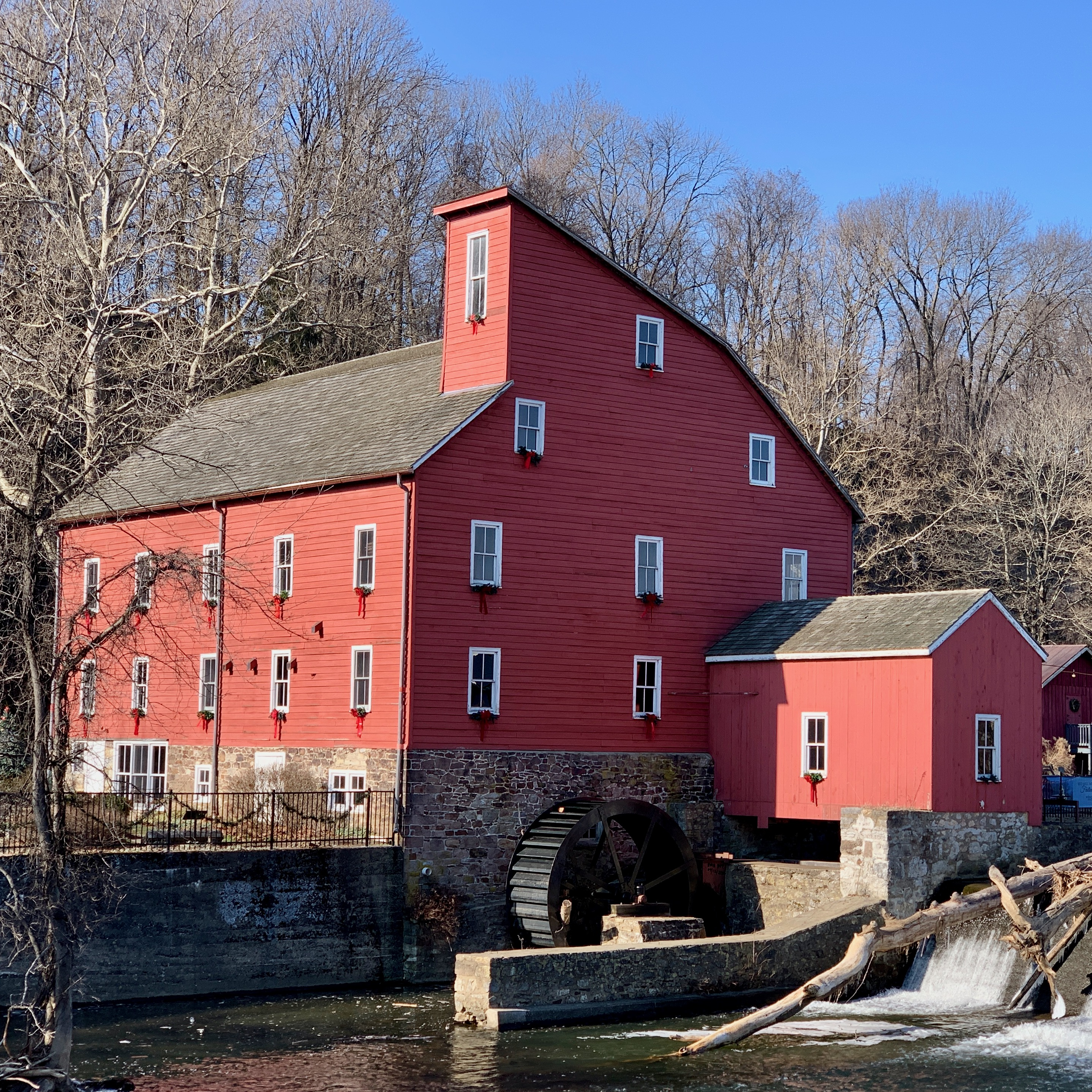
Red Mill

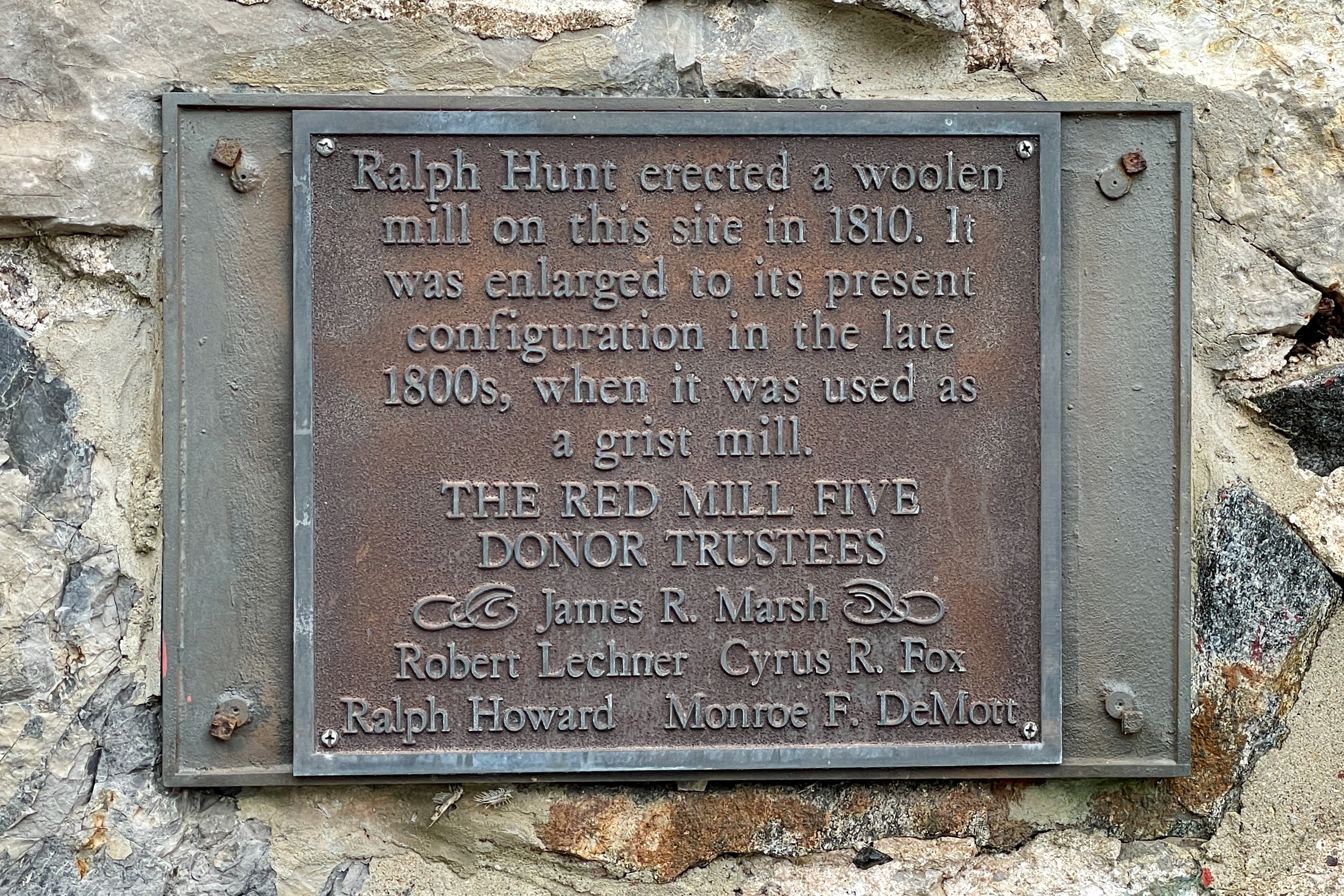
Historical information plaque by the Red Mill Five Donor Trustees

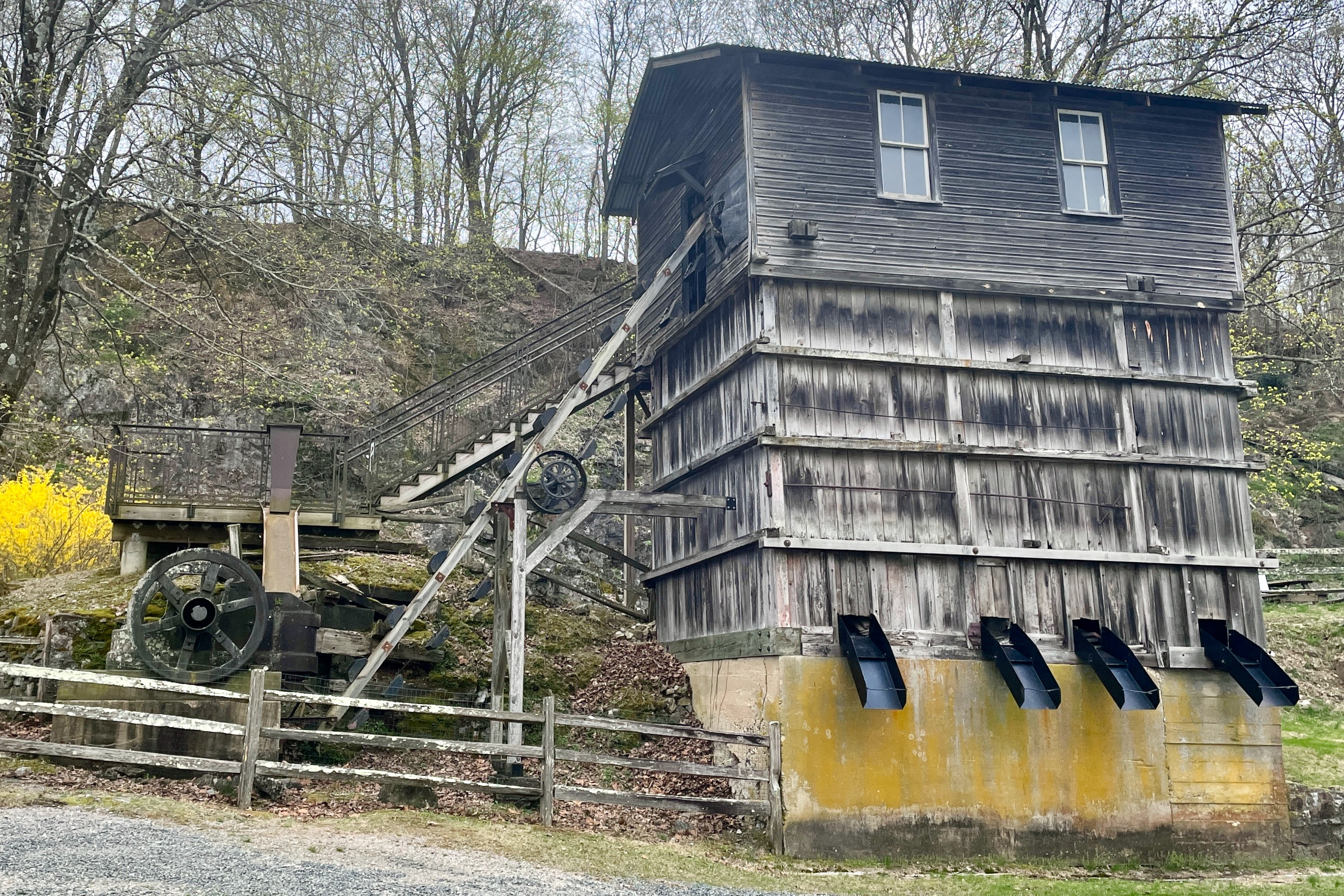
Quarry crusher and screen house

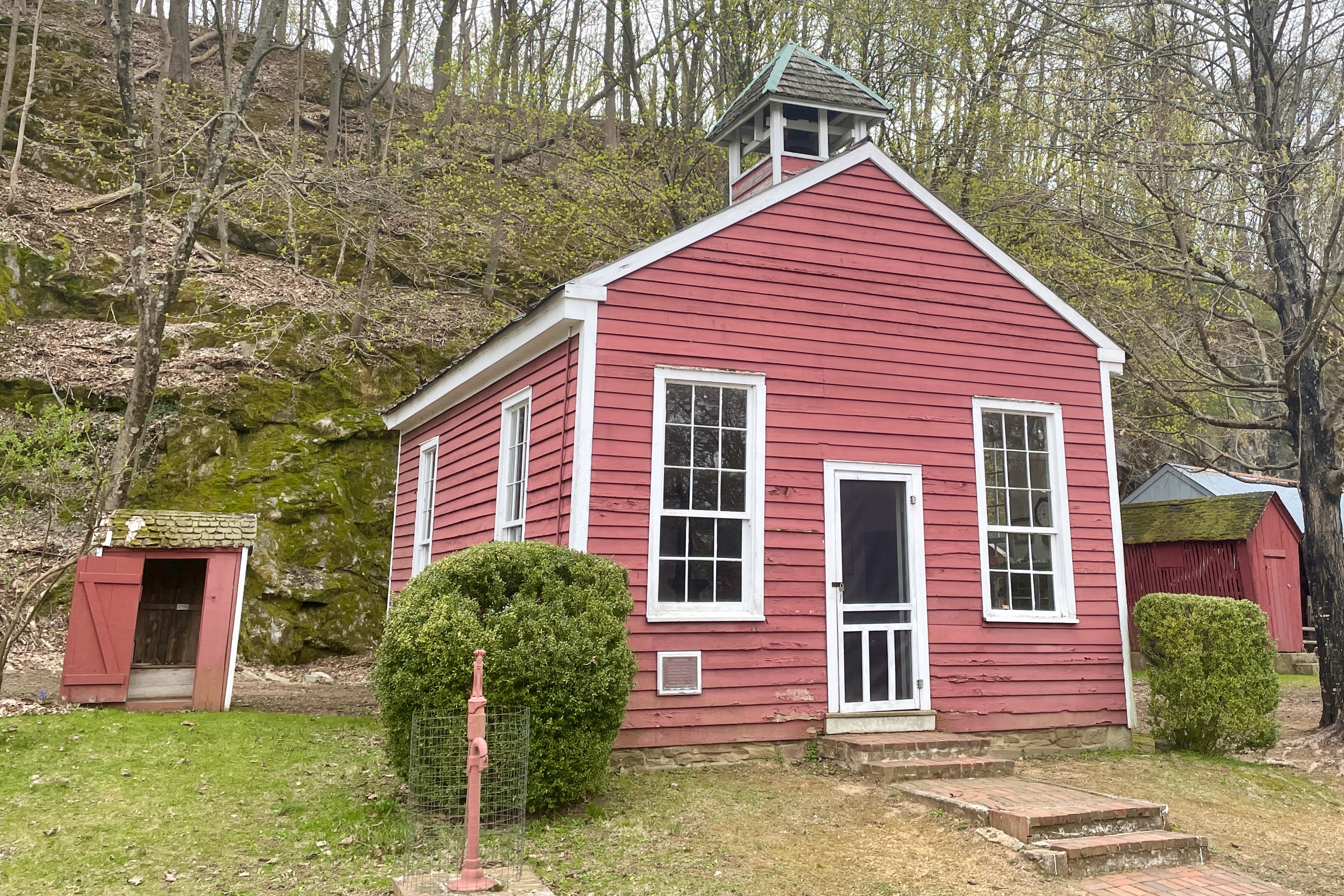
Bunker Hill School House

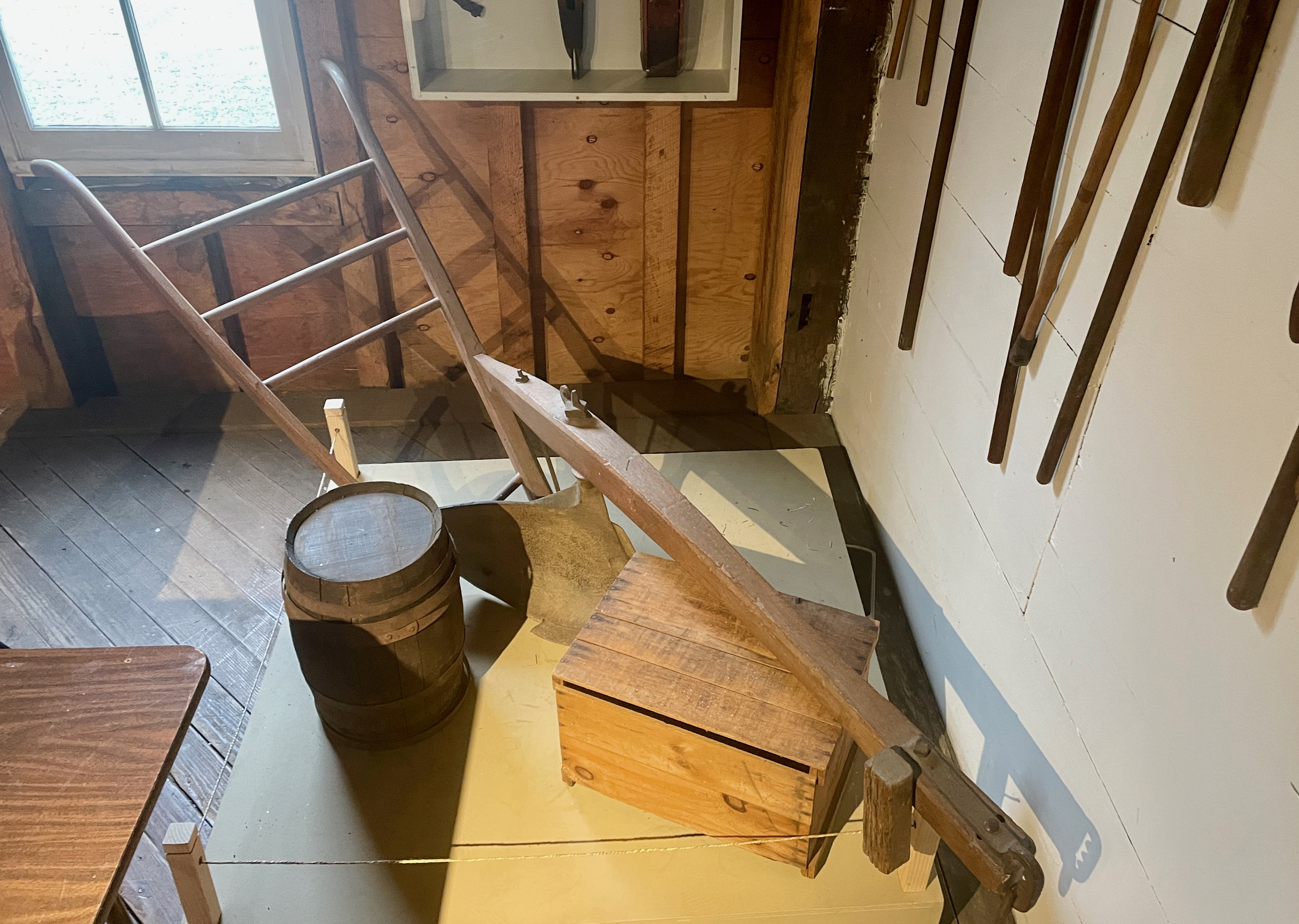
Agricultural equipment on display in the mill

== See also ==
- List of museums in New Jersey
