= Alice Randall Marsh =

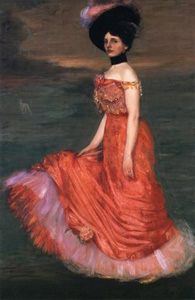
- Portrait of Alice Randall Marsh Lady in Scarlett by Frederick Dana Marsh
- Born: Alice Randall; 1869; Coldwater, Michigan
- Died: October 24, 1929 (aged 59–60); Italy
- Known for: Painting
- Spouse: Frederick Dana Marsh (m. 1895)

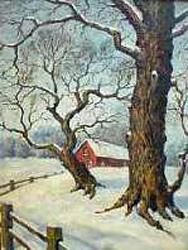
Snow Scene

Alice Randall Marsh (1869-1929) was an American miniature painter and wife of fellow artist Frederick Dana Marsh (1872–1961).

== Biography ==
Alice Marsh, née Randall, was born in 1869 in Coldwater, Michigan. She attended the School of the Art Institute of Chicago. She also traveled to Paris, France, where she studied under Raphaël Collin, Frederick William MacMonnies, Luc-Olivier Merson, and James McNeill Whistler.

In 1895, while in Paris, she married Frederick Dana Marsh, with whom she had three children. The couple had met in Chicago, where they both attended the School of the Art Institute of Chicago and exhibited work at the 1893 World's Columbian Exposition in Chicago, Illinois. Alice also exhibited her work in the Illinois Building.

Marsh exhibited her paintings at the Paris Salon in 1895. The same year she exhibited at the Art Institute of Chicago

After many years abroad, the couple returned to the United States in 1900. They lived at the Enclosure, an art colony in Nutley, New Jersey. The family relocated to New Rochelle, New York, in 1914. Their son Reginald Marsh (1898–1954) became a painter. Their son James Randall Marsh (1896–1965) became a designer and metal worker.

Marsh died on October 24, 1929, while on vacation in Italy.
