= Clinton, New Jersey =

Town in Hunterdon County, New Jersey, US

- Town
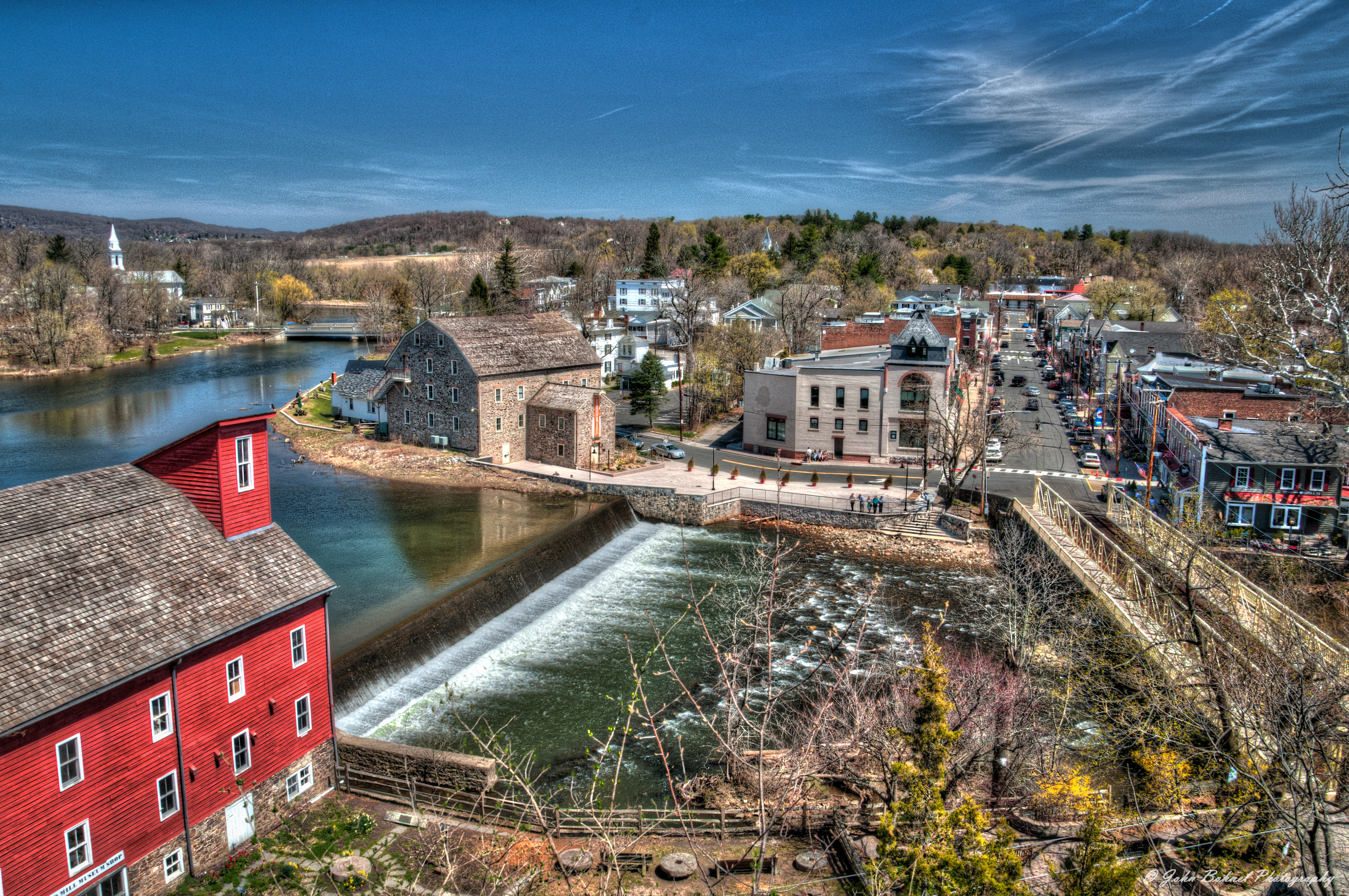
- Red Mill (in foreground) and Clinton (in background) on the other side of the Raritan River

- Seal

- Location of Clinton in Hunterdon County highlighted in red (left). Inset map: Location of Hunterdon County in New Jersey highlighted in orange (right).

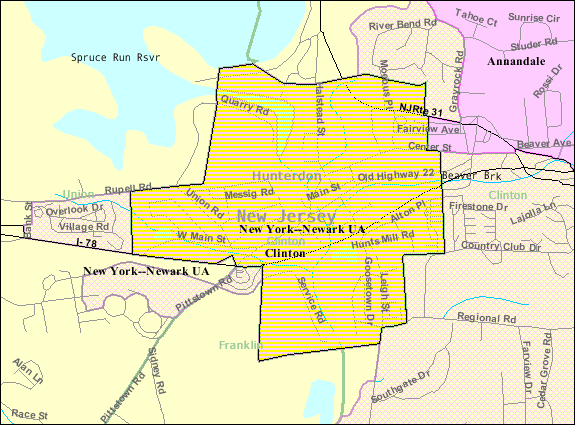
- U.S. Census Bureau map of Clinton with Spruce Run State Park is in the Northwest corner of the map

- Location of Clinton in Hunterdon County Location in New Jersey Location in the United States
- Coordinates: 40.636794°N 74.915205°W
- Country: United States
- State: New Jersey
- County: Hunterdon
- Incorporated: April 5, 1865
- Named after: DeWitt Clinton

Government
  - Type: Town
  - Body: Town Council
  - Mayor: Janice Kovach (D, term ends December 31, 2027)
  - Municipal clerk: Suzannah Givone

Area
  - Total: 1.44 sq mi (3.72 km^{2})
  - Land: 1.35 sq mi (3.49 km^{2})
  - Water: 0.093 sq mi (0.24 km^{2}) 6.39%
  - Rank: 458th of 565 in state 18th of 26 in county
- Elevation: 194 ft (59 m)

Population (2020)
  - Total: 2,773
  - Estimate (2023): 2,781
  - Rank: 456th of 565 in state 18th of 26 in county
  - Density: 2,059.4/sq mi (795.1/km^{2})
  - Rank: 290th of 565 in state 3rd of 26 in county
- Time zone: UTC−05:00 (Eastern (EST))
  - Summer (DST): UTC−04:00 (Eastern (EDT))
- ZIP Code: 08809
- Area code: 908 exchanges: 238, 328, 713, 730, 735
- FIPS code: 3401913720
- GNIS feature ID: 0885189
- Website: www.clintonnj.gov

Clinton is a town in Hunterdon County, in the U.S. state of New Jersey. It is located on the South Branch of the Raritan River in the Raritan Valley region. As of the 2020 United States census, the town's population was 2,773, an increase of 54 (+2.0%) from the 2010 census count of 2,719, which in turn reflected an increase of 87 (+3.3%) from the 2,632 counted in the 2000 census. Despite its relatively small population, Clinton is the predominant control city for Interstate 78 traveling westbound from Newark.

== History ==
When the Clinton post office was established in 1829, it was named for DeWitt Clinton, Governor of New York and the primary impetus behind the then-newly completed Erie Canal.

Clinton was incorporated as a town by an act of the New Jersey Legislature on April 5, 1865, within portions of Clinton, Franklin and Union Townships. Clinton gained full independence from its three parent townships in 1895.

The town is perhaps best known for its two mills which sit on opposite banks of the South Branch Raritan River. The Red Mill, with its historic village, dates back to 1810 with the development of a mill for wool processing. Across the river sits the Stone Mill, home of the Hunterdon Art Museum, located in a former gristmill that had been reconstructed in 1836 and operated continuously until 1952. In 1952, a group of local residents conceived of a plan to convert the historic building into an art museum, which is still in operation today.

On October 30, 1891, a major fire destroyed 23 buildings and 17 businesses on Main Street. This is known here as the Great Fire of 1891.

Described by The New York Times in 1988 as having "conquered the worst residential radon hotspot known in the United States" which resulted from uranium in the limestone under sections of the town, Clinton and mayor-at-the-time Robert A. Nulman received state, national, and international attention for the town's successful efforts to combat the radon using ventilation systems in affected homes.

The Clinton Historic District encompassing much of the town was added to the National Register of Historic Places in 1995 for its significance in architecture, commerce, engineering, industry and exploration/settlement. The district includes 270 contributing buildings.

In 1998, Republican Assemblyman Michael Patrick Carroll proposed to honor former president Ronald Reagan by changing the town's name to Reagan, New Jersey, and renaming Clinton Township to Reagan Township.

== Geography ==
According to the U.S. Census Bureau, the town had a total area of 1.44 square miles (3.72 km^{2}), including 1.35 square miles (3.49 km^{2}) of land and 0.09 square miles (0.24 km^{2}) of water (6.39%).

The town borders the Hunterdon County municipalities of Clinton Township, Franklin Township and Union Township.

Clinton is considered an exurb of New York City, as Hunterdon County lies on the western fringe of the New York City Metropolitan Area, which is mainly rural with scattered housing developments and old farm homes. Clinton is part of the Primary Metropolitan Statistical Area of Middlesex, Somerset and Hunterdon counties in New Jersey. It serves as a bedroom community for many commuters working in and around Northern New Jersey and New York City, often younger residents who have supplanted long-time residents of Clinton.

=== Climate ===
Climate data for Clinton, New Jersey
| Month | Jan | Feb | Mar | Apr | May | Jun | Jul | Aug | Sep | Oct | Nov | Dec | Year |
|---|---|---|---|---|---|---|---|---|---|---|---|---|---|
| Record high °F (°C) | 74.0 (23.3) | 77.0 (25.0) | 88.0 (31.1) | 94.0 (34.4) | 99.0 (37.2) | 102.0 (38.9) | 106.0 (41.1) | 104.0 (40.0) | 105.0 (40.6) | 97.0 (36.1) | 84.0 (28.9) | 75.0 (23.9) | 106.0 (41.1) |
| Mean daily maximum °F (°C) | 36.8 (2.7) | 39.9 (4.4) | 49.8 (9.9) | 61.3 (16.3) | 72.0 (22.2) | 80.2 (26.8) | 85.1 (29.5) | 83.1 (28.4) | 75.6 (24.2) | 64.4 (18.0) | 52.8 (11.6) | 41.6 (5.3) | 61.9 (16.6) |
| Mean daily minimum °F (°C) | 18.4 (−7.6) | 20.0 (−6.7) | 28.1 (−2.2) | 37.0 (2.8) | 46.9 (8.3) | 56.0 (13.3) | 61.7 (16.5) | 59.9 (15.5) | 52.0 (11.1) | 40.0 (4.4) | 32.2 (0.1) | 24.0 (−4.4) | 39.7 (4.3) |
| Record low °F (°C) | −18.0 (−27.8) | −16.0 (−26.7) | −6.0 (−21.1) | 14.0 (−10.0) | 25.0 (−3.9) | 34.0 (1.1) | 41.0 (5.0) | 37.0 (2.8) | 27.0 (−2.8) | 18.0 (−7.8) | 2.0 (−16.7) | −14.0 (−25.6) | −18.0 (−27.8) |
| Average precipitation inches (mm) | 3.78 (96) | 3.16 (80) | 4.27 (108) | 4.30 (109) | 4.62 (117) | 4.64 (118) | 5.16 (131) | 3.67 (93) | 4.31 (109) | 4.48 (114) | 3.82 (97) | 4.29 (109) | 50.5 (1,280) |

Clinton falls under the North Jersey climate zone. According to the Office of the New Jersey State Climatologist at Rutgers University, the Northern climate zone covers about one-quarter of New Jersey and consists mainly of elevated highlands and valleys which are part of the Appalachian Uplands. Surrounded by land, this region can be characterized as having a continental climate with minimal influence from the Atlantic Ocean, except when the winds contain an easterly component. Prevailing winds are from the southwest in summer and from the northwest in winter. Being in the northernmost portion of the state, and with small mountains up to 1,800 feet (550 m) in elevation, the Northern Zone normally exhibits a colder temperature regime than other climate regions of the State of New Jersey. This difference is most dramatic in winter when average temperatures in the Northern Zone can be more than ten degrees Fahrenheit cooler than in the Coastal Zone. Annual snowfall averages 40 to 50 inches (100 to 130 cm) in the northern zone as compared with an average of 10 to 15 inches (25 to 38 cm) in the extreme south.

Clinton falls under the USDA 6b Plant Hardiness zone.

== Demographics ==
Historical population
| Census | Pop. | Note | %± |
|---|---|---|---|
| 1870 | 785 | | — |
| 1880 | 842 | | 7.3% |
| 1890 | 913 | | 8.4% |
| 1900 | 816 | | −10.6% |
| 1910 | 836 | | 2.5% |
| 1920 | 950 | | 13.6% |
| 1930 | 932 | | −1.9% |
| 1940 | 1,066 | | 14.4% |
| 1950 | 1,118 | | 4.9% |
| 1960 | 1,158 | | 3.6% |
| 1970 | 1,742 | | 50.4% |
| 1980 | 1,910 | | 9.6% |
| 1990 | 2,054 | | 7.5% |
| 2000 | 2,632 | | 28.1% |
| 2010 | 2,719 | | 3.3% |
| 2020 | 2,773 | | 2.0% |
| 2023 (est.) | 2,781 | ▲ | 0.3% |
Population sources: 1870–1920; 1870 1880–1890; 1890–1910 1910–1930; 1940–2000 2000; 2010 2020

=== 2020 census ===
As of the 2020 census, Clinton had a population of 2,773. The median age was 42.3 years. 22.0% of residents were under the age of 18 and 14.3% of residents were 65 years of age or older. For every 100 females there were 92.0 males, and for every 100 females age 18 and over there were 89.3 males age 18 and over.

100.0% of residents lived in urban areas, while 0.0% lived in rural areas.

There were 1,114 households in Clinton, of which 33.4% had children under the age of 18 living in them. Of all households, 52.5% were married-couple households, 14.2% were households with a male householder and no spouse or partner present, and 28.4% were households with a female householder and no spouse or partner present. About 27.7% of all households were made up of individuals and 10.2% had someone living alone who was 65 years of age or older.

There were 1,157 housing units, of which 3.7% were vacant. The homeowner vacancy rate was 0.8% and the rental vacancy rate was 3.4%.

Racial composition as of the 2020 census
| Race | Number | Percent |
|---|---|---|
| White | 2,167 | 78.1% |
| Black or African American | 53 | 1.9% |
| American Indian and Alaska Native | 23 | 0.8% |
| Asian | 235 | 8.5% |
| Native Hawaiian and Other Pacific Islander | 1 | 0.0% |
| Some other race | 65 | 2.3% |
| Two or more races | 229 | 8.3% |
| Hispanic or Latino (of any race) | 281 | 10.1% |

=== 2010 census ===
The 2010 United States census counted 2,719 people, 1,057 households, and 727 families in the town. The population density was 2,032.6 per square mile (784.8/km^{2}). There were 1,098 housing units at an average density of 820.8 per square mile (316.9/km^{2}). The racial makeup was 89.52% (2,434) White, 1.32% (36) Black or African American, 0.22% (6) Native American, 6.66% (181) Asian, 0.00% (0) Pacific Islander, 0.63% (17) from other races, and 1.66% (45) from two or more races. Hispanic or Latino of any race were 6.22% (169) of the population.

Of the 1,057 households, 37.0% had children under the age of 18; 55.2% were married couples living together; 9.7% had a female householder with no husband present and 31.2% were non-families. Of all households, 25.4% were made up of individuals and 8.8% had someone living alone who was 65 years of age or older. The average household size was 2.57 and the average family size was 3.14.

26.0% of the population were under the age of 18, 6.1% from 18 to 24, 27.6% from 25 to 44, 28.8% from 45 to 64, and 11.5% who were 65 years of age or older. The median age was 39.6 years. For every 100 females, the population had 94.8 males. For every 100 females ages 18 and older there were 92.8 males.

The Census Bureau's 2006–2010 American Community Survey showed that (in 2010 inflation-adjusted dollars) median household income was $83,850 (with a margin of error of +/− $12,019) and the median family income was $109,375 (+/− $19,698). Males had a median income of $62,697 (+/− $9,258) versus $67,014 (+/− $13,316) for females. The per capita income for the borough was $43,354 (+/− $4,395). About 2.6% of families and 3.2% of the population were below the poverty line, including 2.0% of those under age 18 and 11.9% of those age 65 or over.

=== 2000 census ===
As of the 2000 United States census, there were 2,632 people, 1,068 households, and 724 families residing in the town. The population density was 1,916.0 inhabitants per square mile (739.8/km^{2}). There were 1,095 housing units at an average density of 797.1 per square mile (307.8/km^{2}). The racial makeup of the town was 92.06% White, 1.33% African American, 0.46% Native American, 3.72% Asian, 1.37% from other races, and 1.06% from two or more races. Hispanic or Latino of any race were 4.10% of the population.

There were 1,068 households, out of which 35.4% had children under the age of 18 living with them, 55.3% were married couples living together, 8.9% had a female householder with no husband present, and 32.2% were non-families. 26.3% of all households were made up of individuals, and 7.1% had someone living alone who was 65 years of age or older. The average household size was 2.46 and the average family size was 3.00.

In the town, the population was spread out, with 26.4% under the age of 18, 4.7% from 18 to 24, 35.4% from 25 to 44, 24.2% from 45 to 64, and 9.4% who were 65 years of age or older. The median age was 37 years. For every 100 females, there were 95.3 males. For every 100 females age 18 and over, there were 92.3 males.

The median income for a household in the town was $78,121, and the median income for a family was $88,671. Males had a median income of $61,442 versus $46,397 for females. The per capita income for the town was $37,463. About 0.4% of families and 2.8% of the population were below the poverty line, including 0.6% of those under age 18 and 1.6% of those age 65 or over.

== Arts and culture ==
The Red Mill Museum Village is located on the South Branch of the Raritan River in the town center of Clinton. Built in 1810, the Red Mill originally served as a woolen mill. Over the next 100 years, the Mill was used at different times to process grains, plaster, talc and graphite. The Mill was also used to produce peach baskets, as well as to generate electricity and pump water for the town. Every October, the mill is transformed into a haunted house called the Red Mill Haunted Village. The Haunted Village tends to attract visitors from all over the east coast to the small town. The Red Mill Museum Village was featured on an episode of Ghost Hunters in 2008.

The Hunterdon Art Museum presents changing exhibitions of contemporary art, craft and design in the 19th century Dunham's Mill, the Stone Mill, listed in the National Register of Historic Places. Founded in 1952, the Museum showcases works by internationally recognized and emerging contemporary artists. It also offers a dynamic schedule of over 300 art classes and workshops for children and adults, as well as a summer camp program.

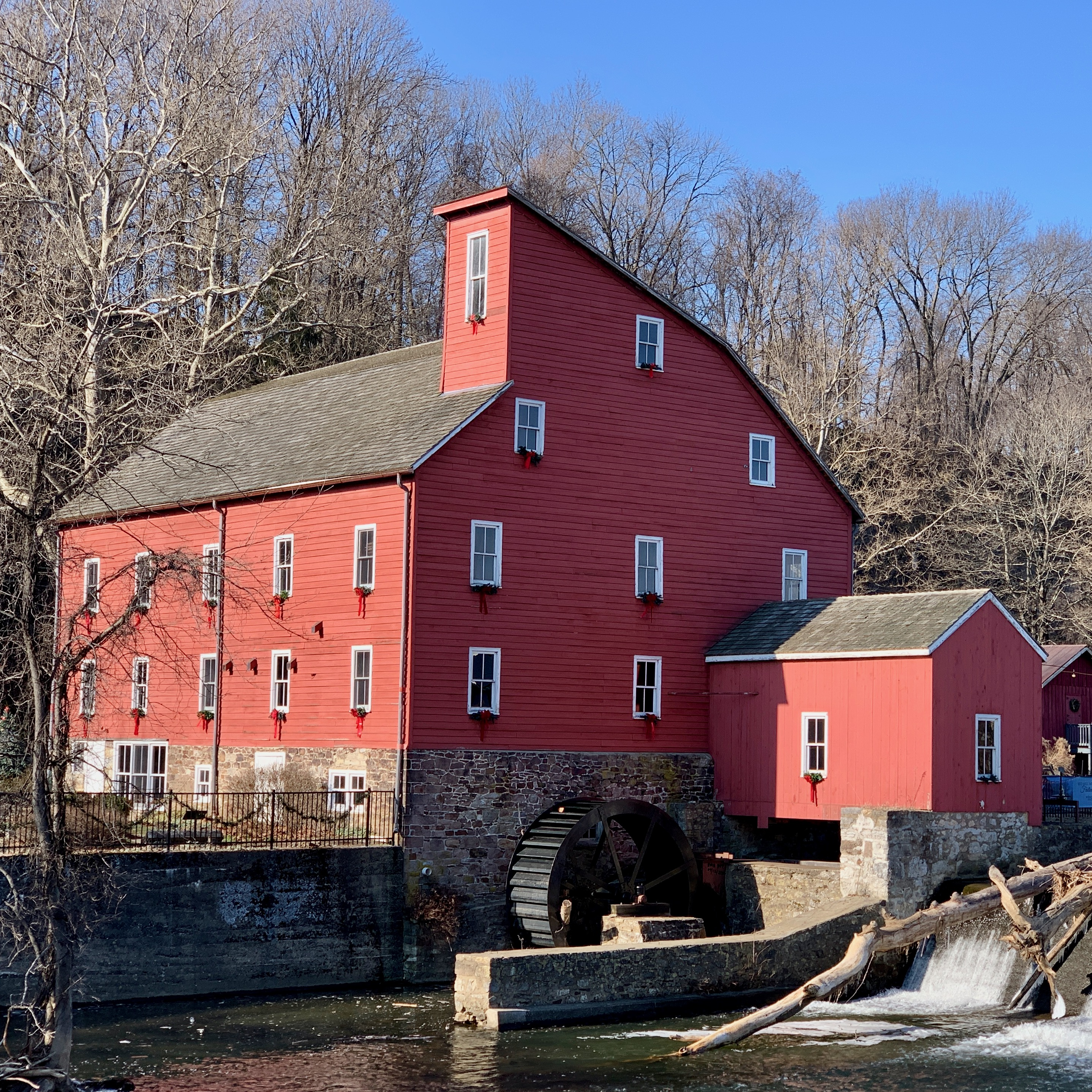
The Red Mill

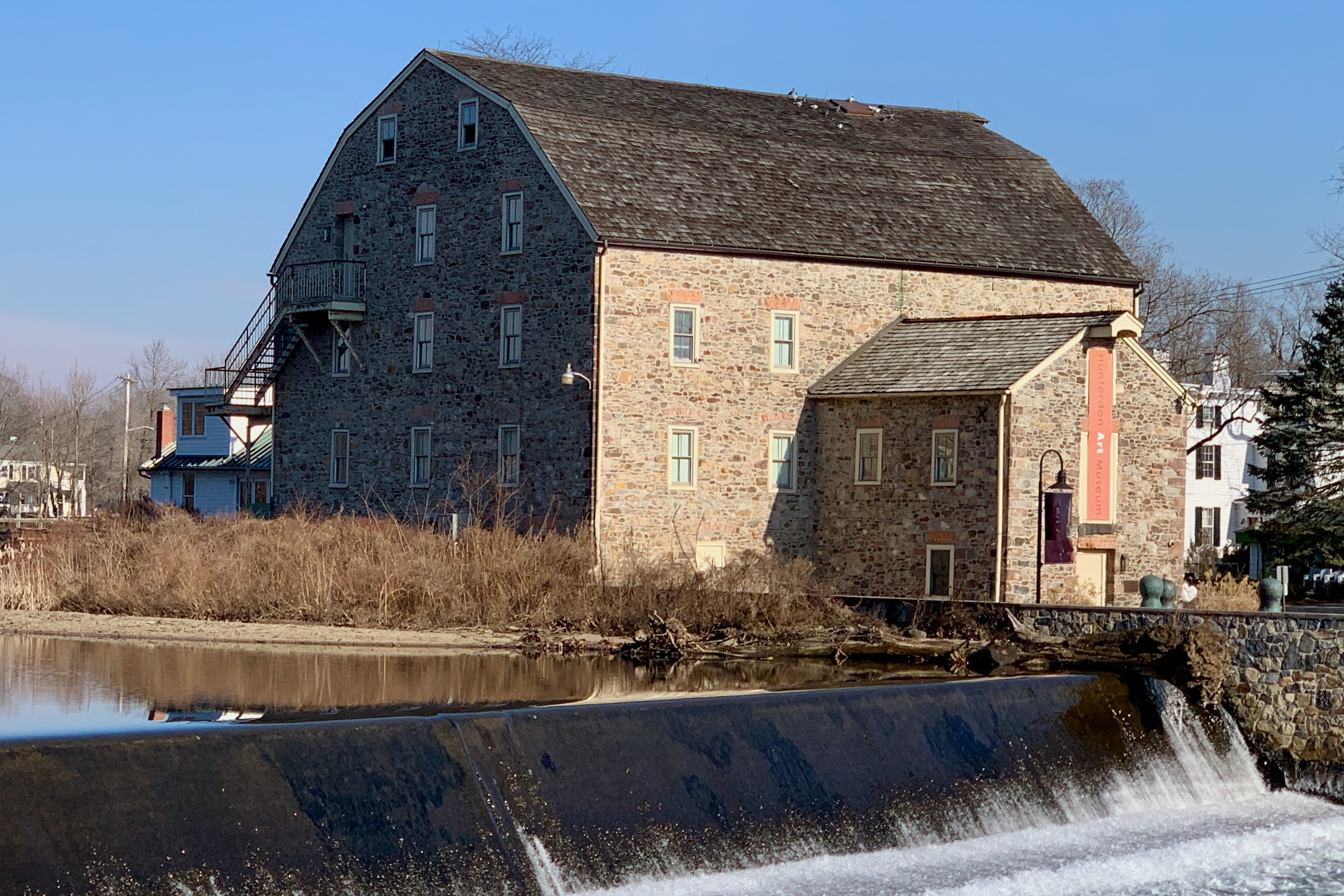
Hunterdon Art Museum in Dunham's Mill

== Parks and recreation ==
- Landsdown Trail, a spur line constructed for the Lehigh Valley Railroad in 1881 that is now a graded rail trail starting about 2 miles (3.2 km) south of Clinton on Landsdown Road that enters Clinton town center near the lumber yard.
- Spruce Run Recreation Area (Van Syckel's Road, Clinton, NJ): 1,961 acres (7.94 km^{2}), picnicking, boating, fishing and seasonal camping. Open year-round.
- Round Valley Recreation Area (Lebanon-Stanton Road, Lebanon, NJ) offers wilderness camping, beaches, trails, fishing and boating.
- The South Branch Raritan River offers opportunities to catch fish including trout and bass.

== Government ==
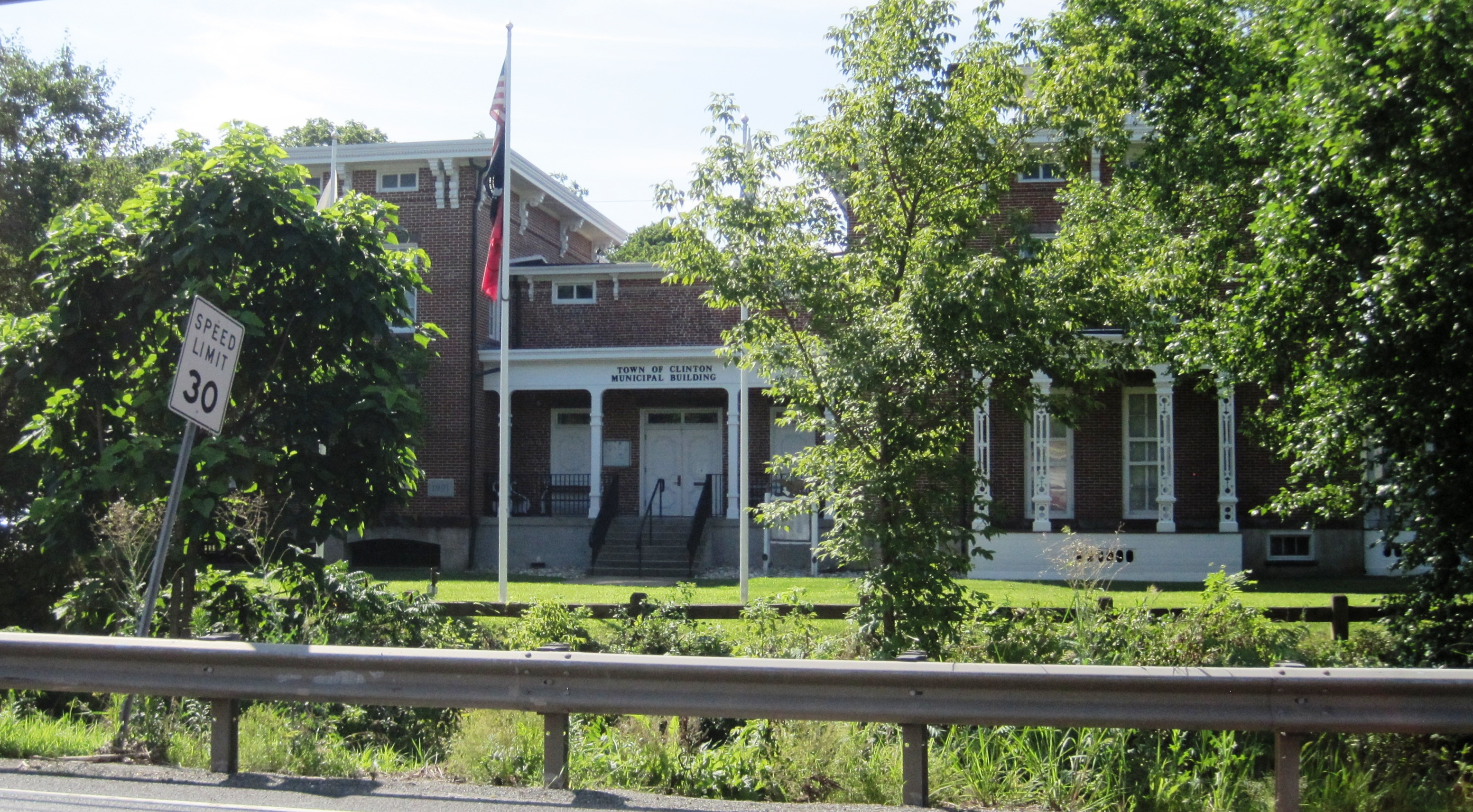
Clinton Municipal Building

=== Local government ===
Clinton is governed under the Town form of municipal government. The town is one of nine municipalities (of the 564) statewide that use this traditional form of government. The governing body is comprised of the Mayor and the six-member Town Council, all of whom are chosen at-large in partisan elections held as part of the November general election. The Mayor is elected directly by the voters to a four-year term of office. Members of the Town Council are elected to three-year terms of office on a staggered basis, with two seats coming up for election each year in a three-year cycle. The primary responsibilities of the council are to serve as the legislative body of the town, approve the annual budget presented by the Mayor, approve payment of bills and serve as Liaisons to several Boards and Committees.

As of 2024, the mayor of Clinton Town is Democrat Janice Kovach, whose fourth term of office ends on December 31, 2027; she first took office as mayor in 2012. Members of the Clinton Town Council are Nick Bruno (R, 2027), John Kashwick (D, 2026), Mary "Molly" Padmos (D, 2025), Kyle Perloff (R, 2027), Kim Stentz (D, 2026) and Ross Traphagen (R, 2025).

==== Fire department ====
Clinton Fire Department (CFD) is located on the corner of New Street / Old Route 22 in Clinton. About 15% of the department's calls annually involve actual fire, while the rest of the CFD's calls are roughly broken down to 15% motor vehicle accidents, 15% hazardous conditions, 5% service calls, 25% good intent calls with no fire found and 25% alarm activations/false alarms, averaging about 190 calls annually. The department offers three types of membership to prospective members: Active firefighter, Junior firefighter and Associate membership. The department runs mutual aid calls with Annandale Hose Company, High Bridge Fire Department, Quakertown Fire Company, Lebanon Fire Company and Pattenburg Fire Company and other fire departments in Hunterdon Country, which work together as part of the North Hunterdon Fire Alliance.

=== Federal, state and county representation ===
Clinton Town is located in the 7th Congressional District and is part of New Jersey's 16th state legislative district.

For the 119th United States Congress, New Jersey's 7th congressional district is represented by Thomas Kean Jr. (R, Westfield). New Jersey is represented in the United States Senate by Democrats Cory Booker (Newark, term ends 2027) and Andy Kim (Moorestown, term ends 2031).

For the 2026–2027 session, the 16th legislative district of the New Jersey Legislature is represented in the New Jersey Senate by Andrew Zwicker (D, South Brunswick) and in the General Assembly by Mitchelle Drulis (D, East Amwell Township) and Roy Freiman (D, Hillsborough Township).

Hunterdon County is governed by a Board of County Commissioners comprised of five members who are elected at-large on a partisan basis to serve three-year terms of office on a staggered basis, with either one or two seats up for election each year as part of the November general election. At an annual reorganization meeting held each January, the commissioners select one member to serve as the board's Director and another to serve as Deputy Director, each for a one-year term. As of 2025, Hunterdon County's Commissioners are Director John E. Lanza (R; Raritan Township, 2025), Deputy Director Shaun C. Van Doren (R; Tewksbury Township, 2026), Jeff Kuhl (R; Raritan Township, 2027), Zachary T. Rich (R; West Amwell Township, 2025) and Susan Soloway (R; Franklin Township, 2027).

Constitutional officers elected on a countywide basis are Clerk Mary H. Melfi (R; Flemington, 2026), Sheriff Fredrick W. Brown (R; Alexandria Township, 2025) and Surrogate Heidi Rohrbach (R; Lebanon Township, 2028).

=== Politics ===
As of June 2023, there were a total of 2,283 registered voters in Clinton, of which 785 (34.4%) were registered as Democrats, 764 (33.5%) registered as Republicans, and 734 (32.2%) as unaffiliated or members of other parties. This compares to March 2011, when there were a total of 1,671 registered voters in Clinton, of which 439 (26.3%) were registered as Democrats, 529 (31.7%) were registered as Republicans and 700 (41.9%) were registered as Unaffiliated. There were 3 voters registered as Libertarians or Greens.

Gubernatorial election results for Clinton
| Year | Republican | | Democratic | | Third party(ies) | |
| Year | No. | % | No. | % | No. | % |
|---|---|---|---|---|---|---|
| 2025 | 681 | 43.88% | 860 | 55.41% | 11 | 0.71% |
| 2021 | 654 | 50.97% | 614 | 47.86% | 15 | 1.17% |
| 2017 | 491 | 51.85% | 433 | 45.72% | 23 | 2.43% |
| 2013 | 557 | 68.43% | 234 | 28.75% | 23 | 2.83% |
| 2009 | 620 | 61.51% | 284 | 28.17% | 104 | 10.32% |
| 2005 | 622 | 57.65% | 407 | 37.72% | 50 | 4.63% |

In the 2020 presidential election, Democrat Joe Biden received 959 votes (54%), Donald Trump received 774 votes (44%), and 41 votes going to others. In the 2012 presidential election, Republican Mitt Romney received 52.0% of the vote (693 cast), ahead of Democrat Barack Obama with 46.7% (623 votes), and other candidates with 1.3% (17 votes), among the 1,351 ballots cast by the town's 1,780 registered voters (18 ballots were spoiled), for a turnout of 75.9%. In the 2008 presidential election, Democrat Barack Obama received 49.4% of the vote (704 cast), ahead of Republican John McCain with 48.7% (694 votes) and other candidates with 1.2% (17 votes), among the 1,426 ballots cast by the town's 1,732 registered voters, for a turnout of 82.3%. In the 2004 presidential election, Republican George W. Bush received 54.8% of the vote (761 ballots cast), outpolling Democrat John Kerry with 44.0% (611 votes) and other candidates with 0.7% (12 votes), among the 1,389 ballots cast by the town's 1,671 registered voters, for a turnout percentage of 83.1.

United States presidential election results for Clinton
| Year | Republican | | Democratic | | Third party(ies) | |
| Year | No. | % | No. | % | No. | % |
|---|---|---|---|---|---|---|
| 2024 | 812 | 44.79% | 948 | 52.29% | 53 | 2.92% |
| 2020 | 774 | 43.63% | 959 | 54.06% | 41 | 2.31% |
| 2016 | 647 | 46.38% | 666 | 47.74% | 82 | 5.88% |
| 2012 | 693 | 51.99% | 623 | 46.74% | 17 | 1.28% |
| 2008 | 694 | 49.05% | 704 | 49.75% | 17 | 1.20% |
| 2004 | 761 | 54.99% | 611 | 44.15% | 12 | 0.87% |

In the 2013 gubernatorial election, Republican Chris Christie received 69.2% of the vote (577 cast), ahead of Democrat Barbara Buono with 28.1% (234 votes), and other candidates with 2.8% (23 votes), among the 840 ballots cast by the town's 1,757 registered voters (6 ballots were spoiled), for a turnout of 47.8%. In the 2009 gubernatorial election, Republican Chris Christie received 60.5% of the vote (620 ballots cast), ahead of Democrat Jon Corzine with 27.7% (284 votes), Independent Chris Daggett with 9.5% (97 votes) and other candidates with 0.7% (7 votes), among the 1,025 ballots cast by the town's 1,711 registered voters, yielding a 59.9% turnout.

United States Senate election results for Clinton1
| Year | Republican | | Democratic | | Third party(ies) | |
| Year | No. | % | No. | % | No. | % |
|---|---|---|---|---|---|---|
| 2024 | 795 | 45.25% | 908 | 51.68% | 54 | 3.07% |
| 2018 | 664 | 50.80% | 599 | 45.83% | 44 | 3.37% |
| 2012 | 669 | 52.43% | 564 | 44.20% | 43 | 3.37% |
| 2006 | 535 | 57.28% | 352 | 37.69% | 47 | 5.03% |

United States Senate election results for Clinton2
| Year | Republican | | Democratic | | Third party(ies) | |
| Year | No. | % | No. | % | No. | % |
|---|---|---|---|---|---|---|
| 2020 | 790 | 45.19% | 910 | 52.06% | 48 | 2.75% |
| 2014 | 386 | 51.95% | 336 | 45.22% | 21 | 2.83% |
| 2013 | 334 | 56.90% | 249 | 42.42% | 4 | 0.68% |
| 2008 | 751 | 56.21% | 528 | 39.52% | 57 | 4.27% |

== Education ==
Clinton-Glen Gardner School District is school district based in the Town of Clinton, that serves students from Clinton Town and Glen Gardner Borough in pre-kindergarten through eighth grade at Clinton Public School. Before Glen Gardner, a non-operating district, was consolidated into the district, students from the borough had attended the district's school as part of a sending/receiving relationship. Other students attend the school on a tuition basis. Formerly known as the Town of Clinton School District, the district's board of education voted in November 2009 to revise the name to Clinton-Glen Gardner School District to reflect the merger. As of the 2021–22 school year, the district, comprised of one school, had an enrollment of 427 students and 38.3 classroom teachers (on an FTE basis), for a student–teacher ratio of 11.1:1.

Public school students in ninth through twelfth grades have two choices: North Hunterdon High School or Voorhees High School, both of the North Hunterdon-Voorhees Regional High School District. Clinton residents began to select which high school they wished to attend in 2014. Pre-2014, Clinton Town students were zoned to North Hunterdon High.

Eighth grade students from all of Hunterdon County are eligible to apply to attend the high school programs offered by the Hunterdon County Vocational School District, a county-wide vocational school district that offers career and technical education at its campuses in Raritan Township and at programs sited at local high schools, with no tuition charged to students for attendance.

== Transportation ==
=== Roads and highways ===
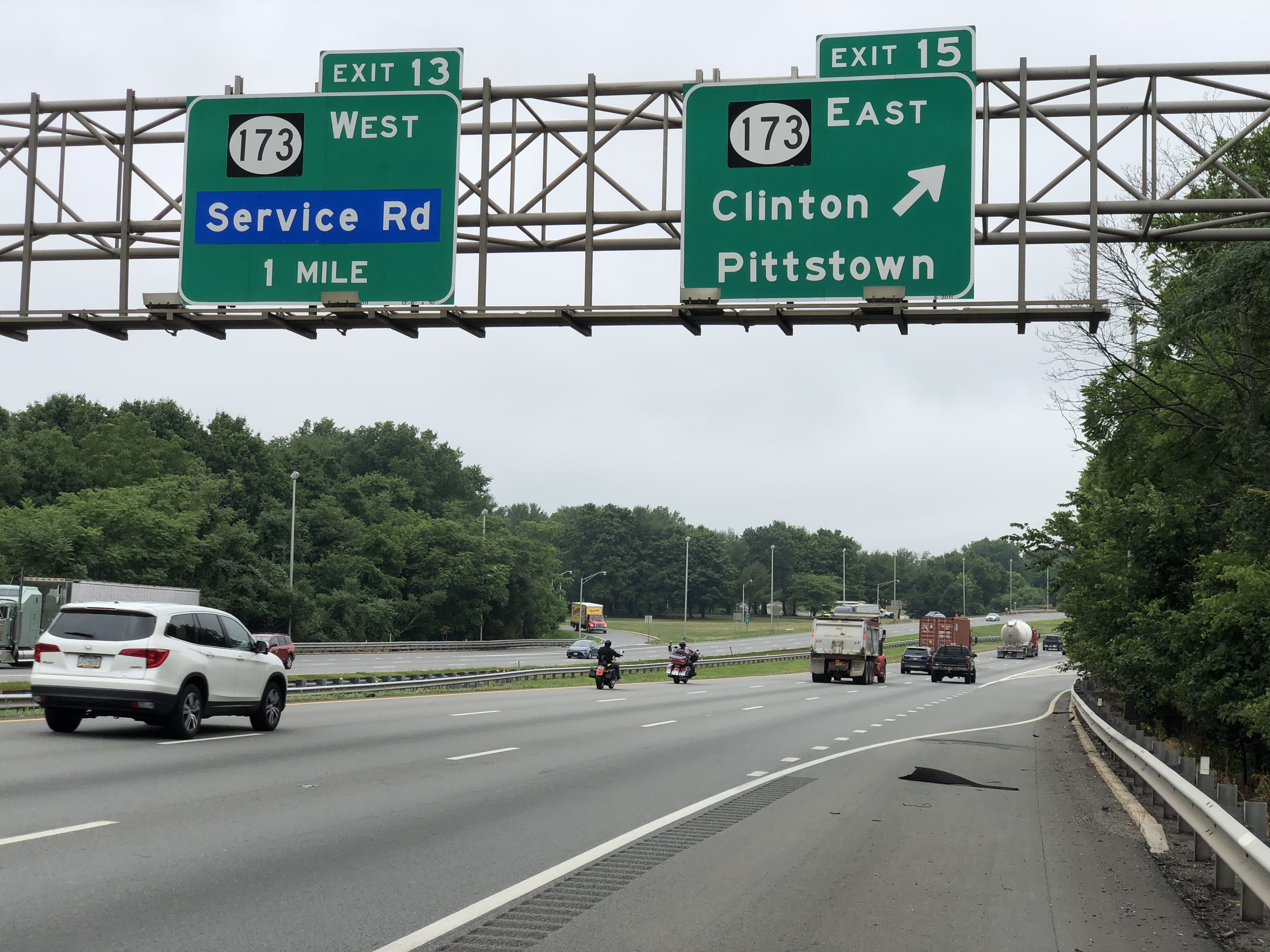
Interstate 78/U.S. Route 22 westbound at the Route 173 exit in Clinton

As of July 2015, the town had a total of 12.21 miles (19.65 km) of roadways, of which 8.72 miles (14.03 km) were maintained by the municipality and 3.49 miles (5.62 km) by the New Jersey Department of Transportation.

Several roadways pass through the town. The most major road passing through Clinton is Interstate 78/U.S. Route 22, which run concurrently through the area. Direct access is provided by New Jersey Route 31 at Exit 17 and at Exit 15 for Route 173 and County Road 513. Route 173 and CR 513 run through the center of town, while Route 31 skims the northeast edge. Access to Interstate 78 provides Clinton with a route to and from New York City and the Lehigh Valley in Pennsylvania. Philadelphia can also be accessed from Clinton via New Jersey Route 31 to Interstate 295 south.

=== Public transportation ===
Trans-Bridge Lines offers buses on a route that provides service from Allentown and Bethlehem, Pennsylvania to the Port Authority Bus Terminal in Midtown Manhattan and New York City-area airports at a stop at the park-and-ride on Route 31 in Clinton. Limited NJ Transit Rail is also accessible at the Annandale station on the Raritan Valley Line.

The LINK, which serves Hunterdon County is the primary traditional publicly funded mode of transportation. Fares range from about $2.00 to $10.00. Funding for operation of the Hunterdon County LINK System is provided by Hunterdon County, NJ Transit and the Federal Transit Administration. Additionally, Warren County operates a shuttle along Route 31 Monday–Friday to Oxford Township.

== References in popular culture ==
=== In film ===
- Several movies have used the town as a backdrop, including In and Out with Kevin Kline, One True Thing with Renée Zellweger and Meryl Streep, My Giant with Billy Crystal, and Turbulence with Ray Liotta. A music video for Sharon Van Etten's single "Seventeen" was partially filmed in the town, as well as at nearby Round Valley Reservoir.

=== In television ===
- The CBS-TV daytime drama As the World Turns taped scenes at businesses along Main Street in 2008 and 2009.

== Notable people ==
People who were born in, residents of, or otherwise closely associated with Clinton include:

- John T. Bird (1829–1911), represented New Jersey's 3rd congressional district from 1869 to 1873
- William Bonnell (1804–1865), portrait painter whose works are generally placed in the folk art category
- Gregg Cagno (born 1969), songwriter and touring performer in the singer-songwriter and folk genres
- Anna Case (1888–1984), soprano who recorded with Thomas Edison
- William J. Connell (born 1958), historian
- Kyp Malone (born 1973), multi-instrumentalist and member of the band TV on the Radio
- Barbara McClintock (born 1955), children's book illustrator and author
- Terry R. McGuire, former professor and Vice Chair of the Department of Genetics at Rutgers University
- Kyle Merber (born 1990), middle-distance runner specializing in the mile and the 1500 meters
- James Valenti (born 1977), operatic tenor
- Sharon Van Etten (born 1981), singer-songwriter
- Foster McGowan Voorhees (1856–1927), Governor of New Jersey from 1899 to 1902
- Jessica Vosk (born 1983), Broadway actress who starred as Elphaba in the Broadway production of Wicked

== Gallery ==
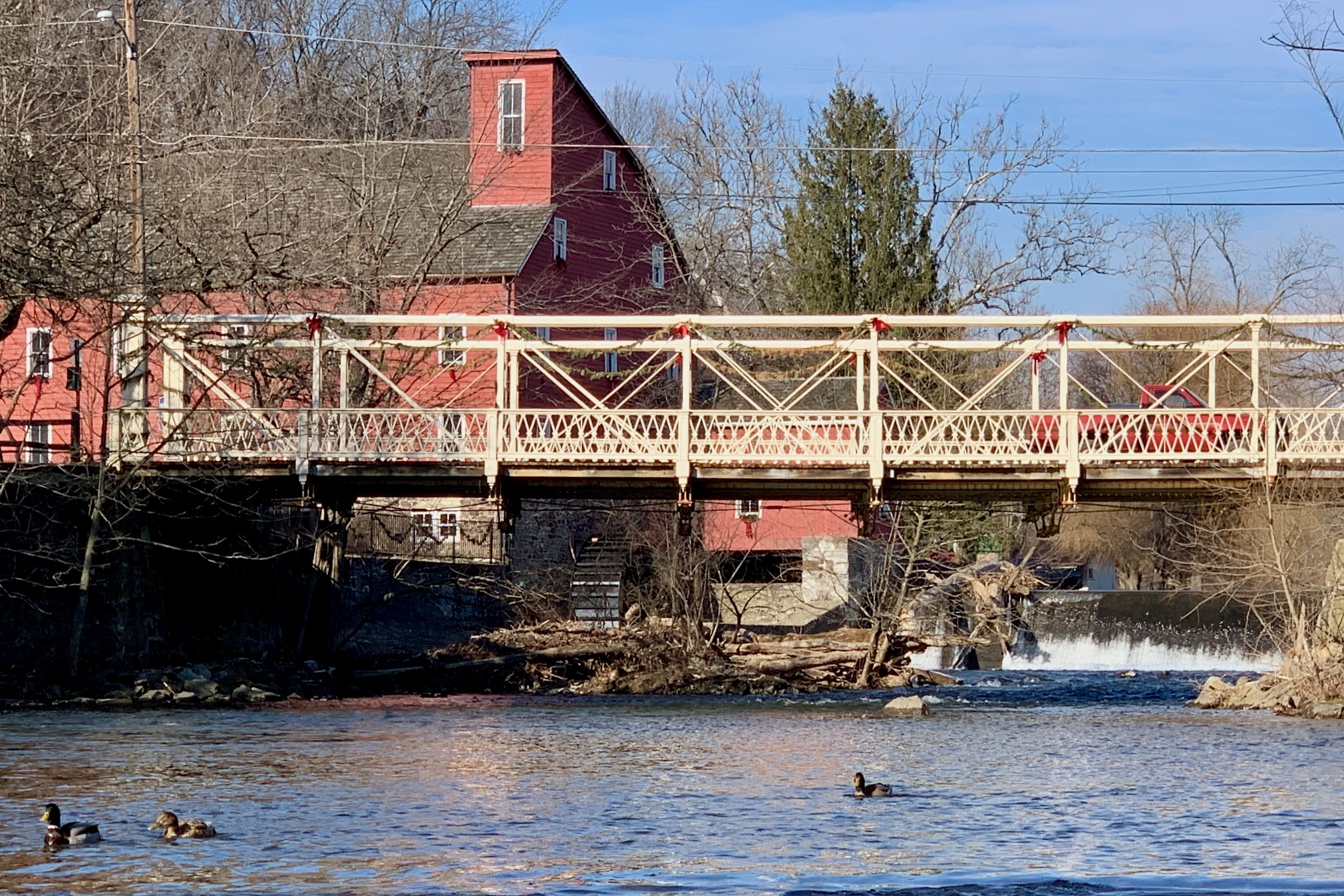
Main Street Bridge crossing the South Branch Raritan River

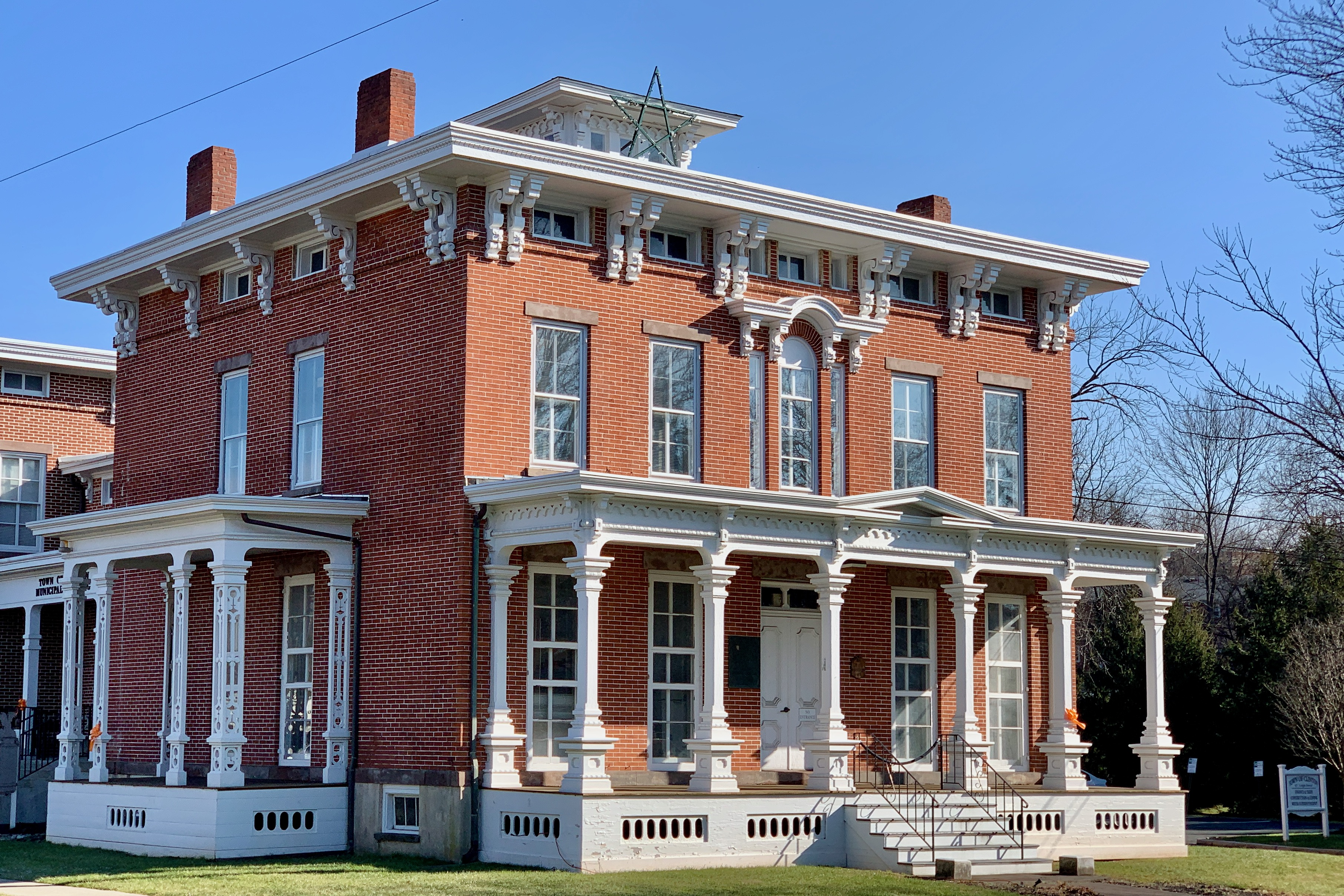
John Taylor Leigh Mansion, now the Municipal Building

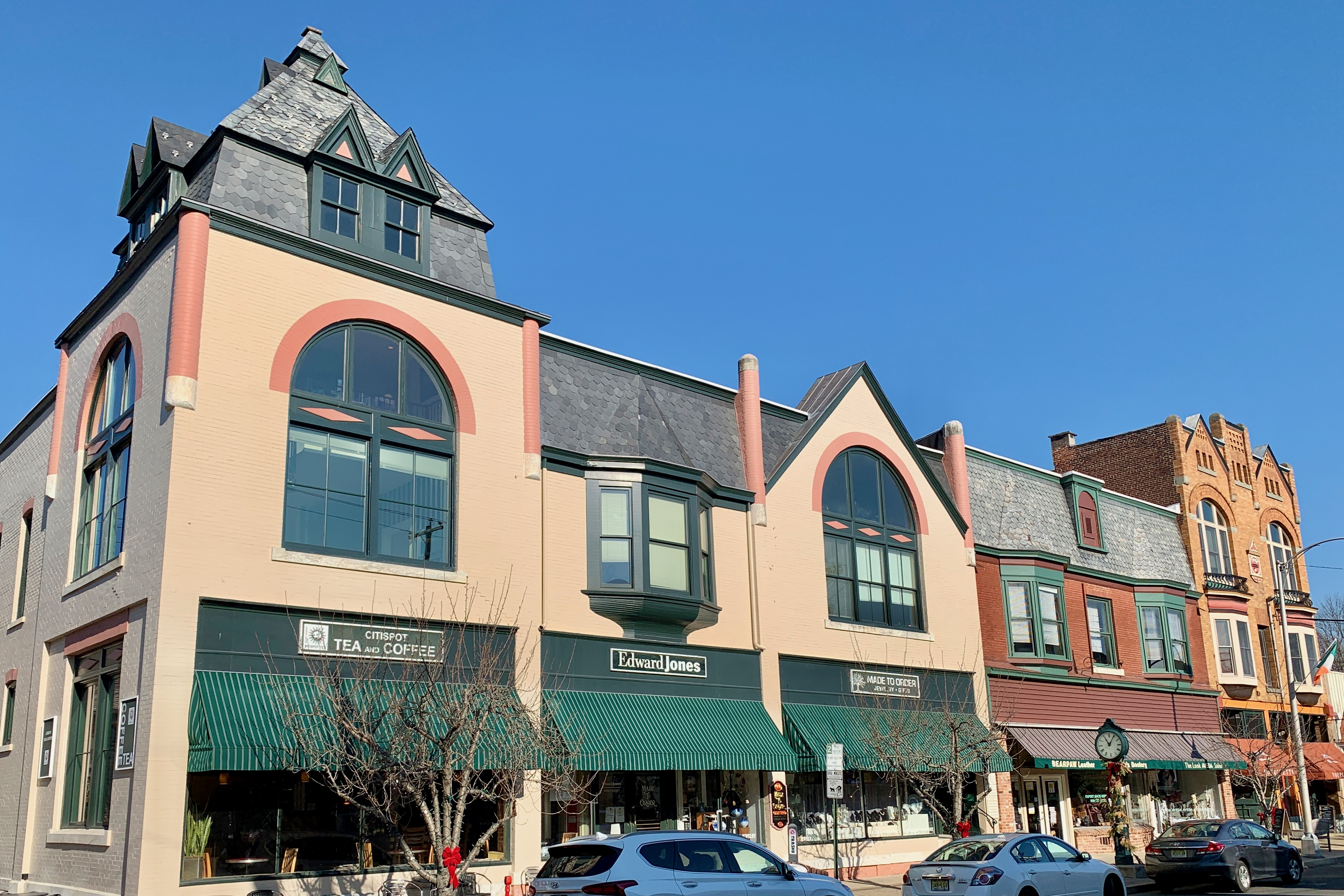
Duckworth Building and Odd Fellows Hall on Main Street, redeveloped after the Great Fire of 1891.

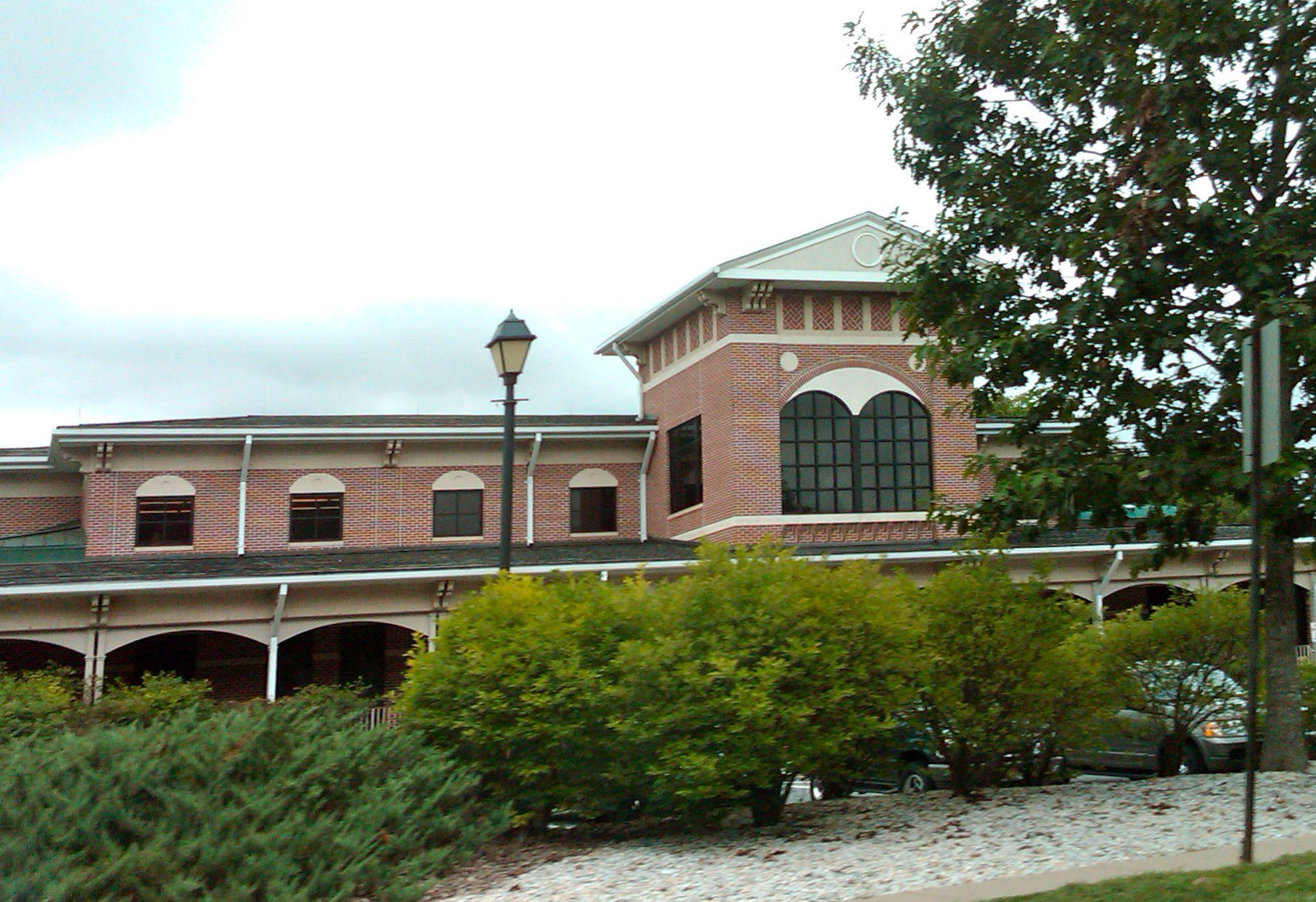
North Branch County Library at 65 Halstead Street. It was built in 1999.

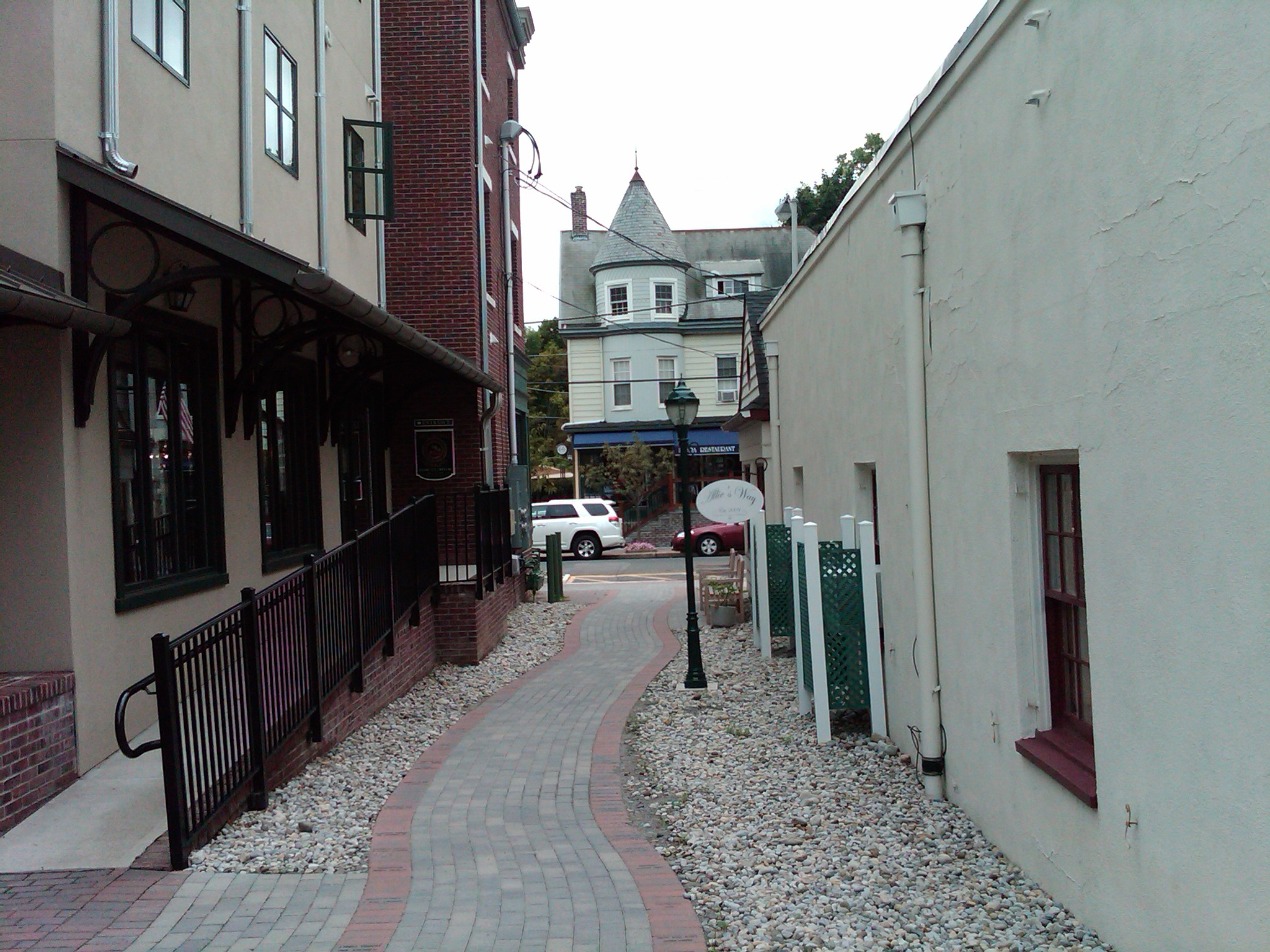
Alley named Allie's Way after a local teacher at Clinton Public School.
