= Dunham (surname) =

Dunham is a toponymic surname of English origin, deriving from several places named Dunham (from Old English: dun- hill, -ham home).

== Variations ==
Variations in spelling of surname Dunham are found across England, including: in Kent, Denham; in Devonshire and Nottingham, Douham; in Norfolk, Downham; and in Dorsetshire, Dynham.

== List of people ==
Individuals with the surname Dunham include:

- Ann Dunham (1942–1995), American anthropologist and pioneer in the field of microfinance
- Anne Dunham (1948–2025), British Para-equestrian
- Archie W. Dunham, former president and chief executive officer of Conoco Inc.
- Cyrus L. Dunham, American Civil War Colonel, U.S. Representative from Indiana
- Emma Bedelia Dunham (1826–1910), American poet, teacher
- Grace Dunham, American poet
- Jack Dunham, American animator and producer
- Jack Dunham (psychologist)
- Jason L. Dunham, United States Marine Corps Corporal and Medal of Honor awardee
- Jeff Dunham, American ventriloquist and prop-comedian
- Jeremiah Dunham Botkin, U.S. Representative from Kansas
- Joanna Dunham (1936–2014), British actor
- Jonathan Singletary Dunham, Member of the New Jersey Provincial Congress
- Katherine Dunham, American choreographer
- Sir Kingsley Charles Dunham, British geologist
- Kurt Dunham, Australian professional snooker player
- Lena Dunham, New York-based filmmaker
- Madelyn Lee Payne Dunham, grandparent of U.S. President Barack Obama
- Mark Wentworth Dunham, horse breeder
- Mike Dunham, American ice hockey player
- Mikel Dunham, American author
- Ransom W. Dunham, U.S. Representative from Illinois
- Rodney Dunham (born 2008), American football player
- Stanley Armour Dunham, grandparent of U.S. President Barack Obama
- Stephen Dunham (1964–2012), American actor
- William Dunham (mathematician)
- William D. Dunham, American Technology Professional
- William D. Dunham (1920–1990), American military flying ace
- William Riley Dunham (1856–1921), American politician, member of the Indiana General Assembly

=== In fiction ===
- Olivia Dunham, FBI agent on TV series Fringe

== See also ==
- Dunham (disambiguation)
