= Denham =

Denham may refer to:

== People ==
- Denham (surname)
- Denham Madena, Sri Lankan cricketer
- Denham Price (1940–2013), South African cricketer

== Places ==
In the United Kingdom

- Denham, Buckinghamshire
  - Denham Aerodrome
  - Denham Country Park
  - Denham Film Studios
  - Denham railway station
  - Denham Roundabout
- Denham, Mid Suffolk, Suffolk
- Denham, St Edmundsbury, Suffolk
- Denham Street, Suffolk
- Corton Denham, Somerset
- Great Denham, Bedfordshire

Elsewhere

- Denham, Western Australia, within Shark Bay
- Denham Town, Kingston, Jamaica
- Denham, Indiana, United States
- Denham, Minnesota, United States
- Den Ham, Twenterand, Netherlands

== Other ==
- Denham baronets, a baronetcy created in 1693
- Denham (brand), a premium jean brand

== See also ==
- Dinham (disambiguation)
- Denholm
- Dunham (disambiguation)
