= Dunham =

Dunham may refer to:

== Surname ==
- Dunham (surname), includes a list of people with the surname

== Places ==
- Dunham, Kentucky, United States
- Dunham, Michigan, United States
- Dunham, Ohio, United States
- Dunham, Nottinghamshire, England
- Dunham, Quebec, Canada
- Dunham Castle, Greater Manchester, England
- Great Dunham, Norfolk, England
- Little Dunham, Norfolk, England
- Dunham Massey, Greater Manchester, England
  - Dunham Massey Hall, an English country house
- Dunham on the Hill, Cheshire, England
- Dunham Town, Greater Manchester, England

== Buildings ==
- Dunham Castle at Oaklawn Farm, Dunham Woods Riding Club, Wayne, Illinois
- Dunham House, near Kempton, Indiana
- Dunham's Mill, listed on the NRHP in Hunterdon County, New Jersey
- Jonathan Singletary Dunham House, Woodbridge Township, Middlesex County, New Jersey
- Dunham Tavern, the oldest building in Cleveland, Ohio
- Dunham Laboratory, Collegiate Gothic building on the campus of Yale University, gift of Austin C. Dunham

== Other ==
- Dunham classification, a classification system for carbonate sedimentary rocks created by Robert J. Dunham
- Dunham expansion, an expression for rotational-vibrational energy level of diatomic molecules
- Dunham's Sports, chain of sporting goods stores
- USS Jason Dunham (DDG-109), an Arleigh Burke destroyer in the United States Navy
- Dunham Jackson, an American mathematician

== See also ==
- Dunham Township (disambiguation)
