= Duniam =

Duniam is a surname. Notable people with the surname include:

- Jonathon Duniam (born 1982), Australian politician
- Sophie Duniam (born 1987), British musician
- Urban Duniam (born 1931), Australian rules footballer

== See also ==
- Dunham (surname)
