= William Dunham =

William Dunham may refer to:

- "By" Dunham (William D. Dunham), American songwriter and film producer
- William Dunham (mathematician) (born 1947), American writer
- William D. Dunham (1920–1990), United States Air Force general
- William Riley Dunham (1856–1921), member of the Indiana General Assembly
