= Music Hall (Clinton, New Jersey) =

- U.S. National Register of Historic Places
- U.S. Historic district – Contributing property
- New Jersey Register of Historic Places
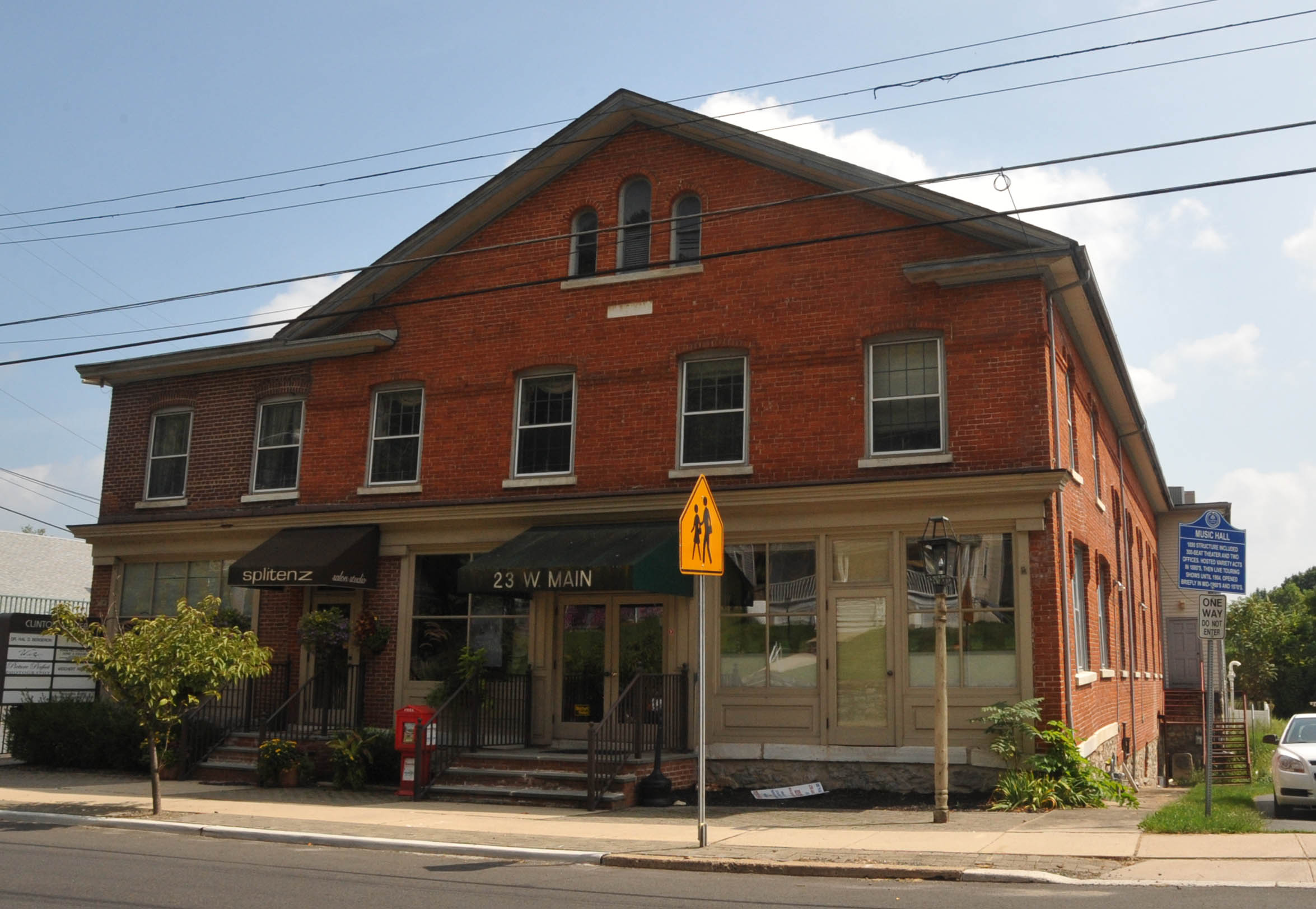

- Location within Hunterdon County, New Jersey Location within New Jersey Location within the United States
- Location: 23 West Main Street, Clinton, New Jersey
- Coordinates: 40°38′01″N 74°54′50″W
- Area: 0.3 acres (0.12 ha)
- Built: 1890
- Part of: Clinton Historic District (ID95001101)
- NRHP reference No.: 82003278
- NJRHP No.: 1571

Significant dates
- Added to NRHP: May 7, 1982
- Designated CP: September 28, 1995
- Designated NJRHP: January 14, 1982

The Music Hall was a historic theatre located at 23 West Main Street in Clinton, Hunterdon County, New Jersey. It was added to the National Register of Historic Places on May 7, 1982, for its significance in commerce, education, music, theatre and film. In 1995, it was also listed as a contributing property of the Clinton Historic District.

== History ==
The Music Hall was built in 1890 and presented performances of many forms of American popular entertainment.

On May 15, 2016, a fire destroyed the interior of the building, then known as Clinton Center. It was demolished later that year.
