= Trinity Episcopal Church (Woodbridge, New Jersey) =

Historic church in New Jersey, United States

- U.S. National Register of Historic Places
- New Jersey Register of Historic Places
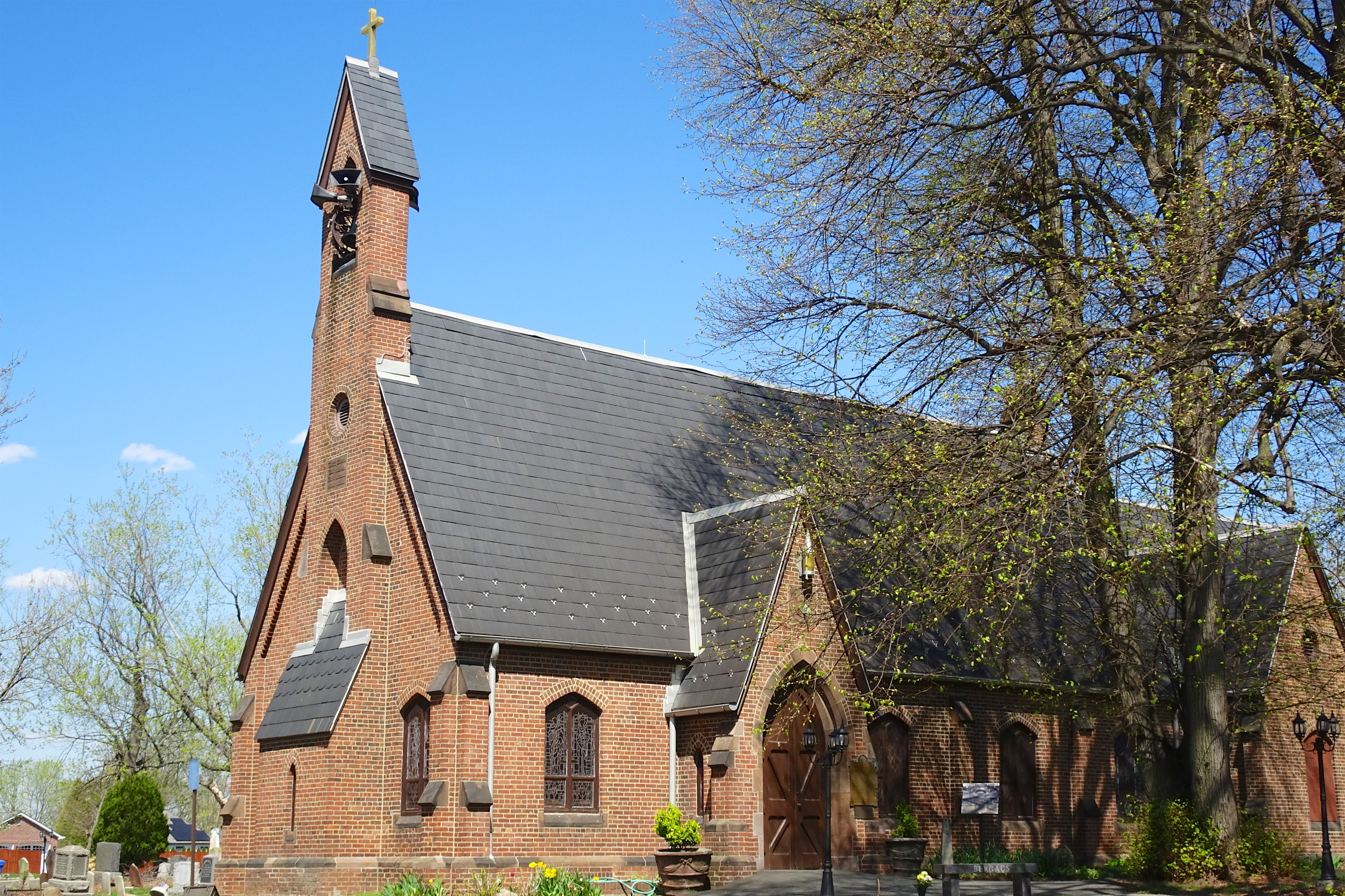
- Trinity Episcopal Church in 2017

- Location within Middlesex County, New Jersey Location within New Jersey Location within the United States
- Location: 650 Rahway Avenue, Woodbridge Township, New Jersey
- Coordinates: 40°33′43″N 74°16′23″W
- Area: 4.6 acres (1.9 ha)
- Built: 1717
- Architect: C. Harrison Condit, Richard Upjohn
- Architectural style: Gothic Revival, Colonial Revival
- NRHP reference No.: 04000431
- NJRHP No.: 4248

Significant dates
- Added to NRHP: May 12, 2004
- Designated NJRHP: March 8, 2004

Trinity Episcopal Church is a historic church located at 650 Rahway Avenue in Woodbridge Township of Middlesex County, New Jersey. The third church at this location, it was added to the National Register of Historic Places on May 12, 2004, for its significance in architecture and religion.

== History ==
The congregation became active on December 29, 1703, and the first church was erected about 1717. The second church, erected on the same site in 1754, was granted a charter by King George III on December 6, 1769. It was destroyed by fire in 1858. The cornerstone of the present church was laid on July 7, 1860. The building was consecrated May 20, 1861.

The church remains active today, with regular services, as well as community involvement, including hosting Alcoholics Anonymous meetings and running a food pantry.

== Description ==
The church was designed by Newark architect C. Harrison Condit in the Gothic Revival style often used by architect Richard Upjohn. It is a one-story brick building laid out in a cruciform plan with a slender bell-cot and features a steeply pitched, gable, slate roof.

St. Martha's House, formerly known as the Sexton House, and the rectory, known as the Jonathan Singletary Dunham House, also contribute to this NRHP listing. The Dunham House features elaborate Flemish checker brickwork.

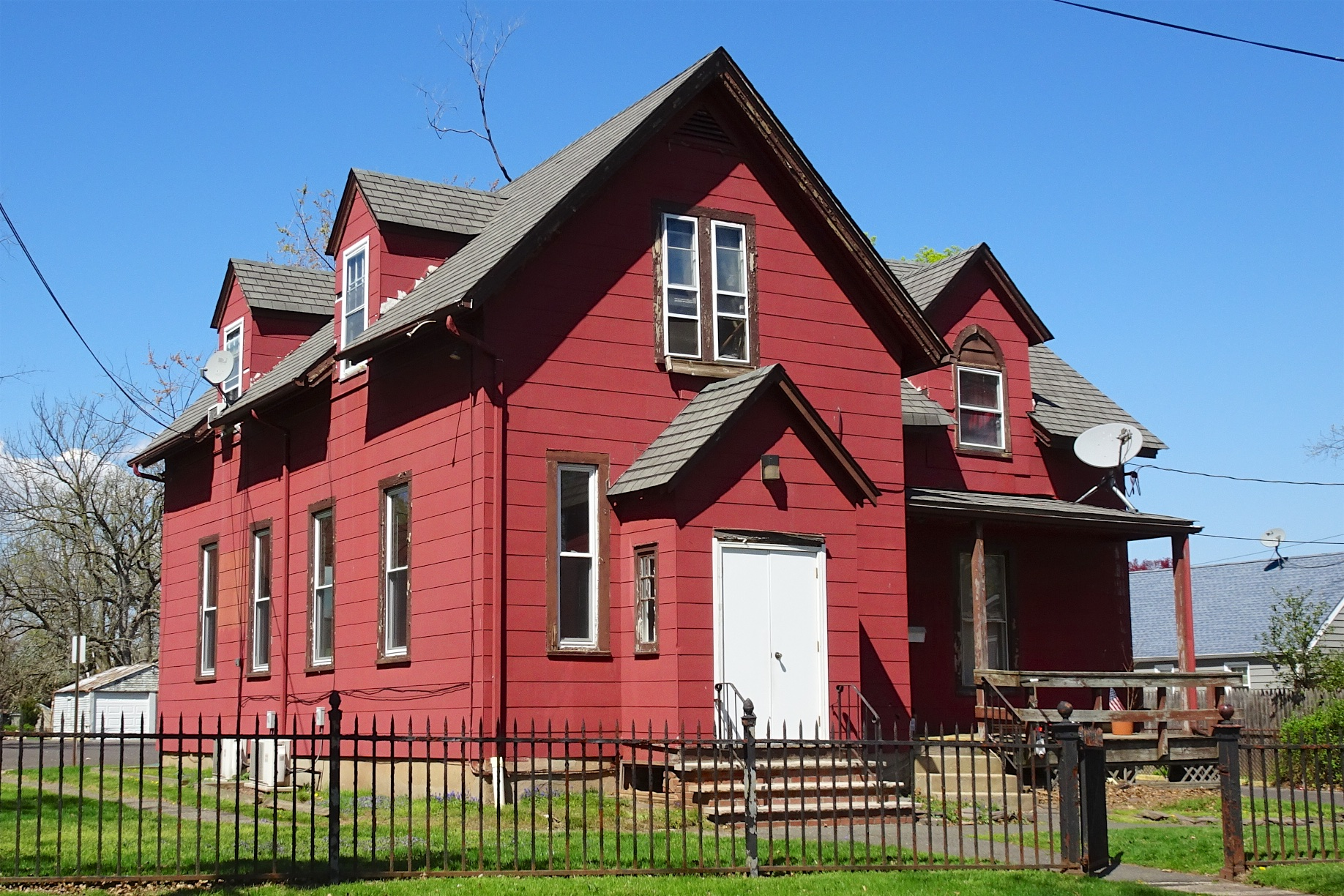
St. Martha's House

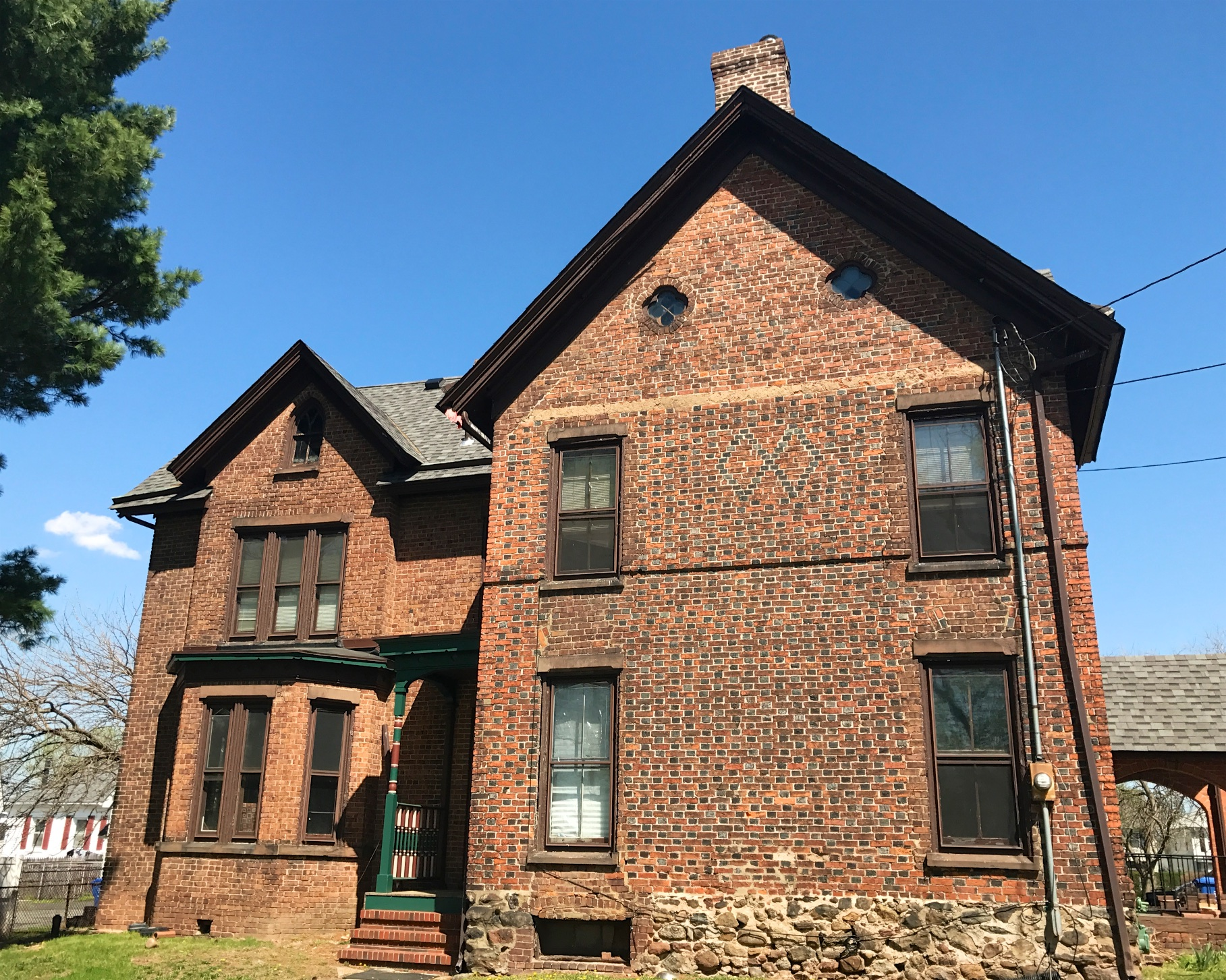
Rectory brickwork

== Cemetery ==
The churchyard contains a cemetery with graves and tombstones dating back to 1715.

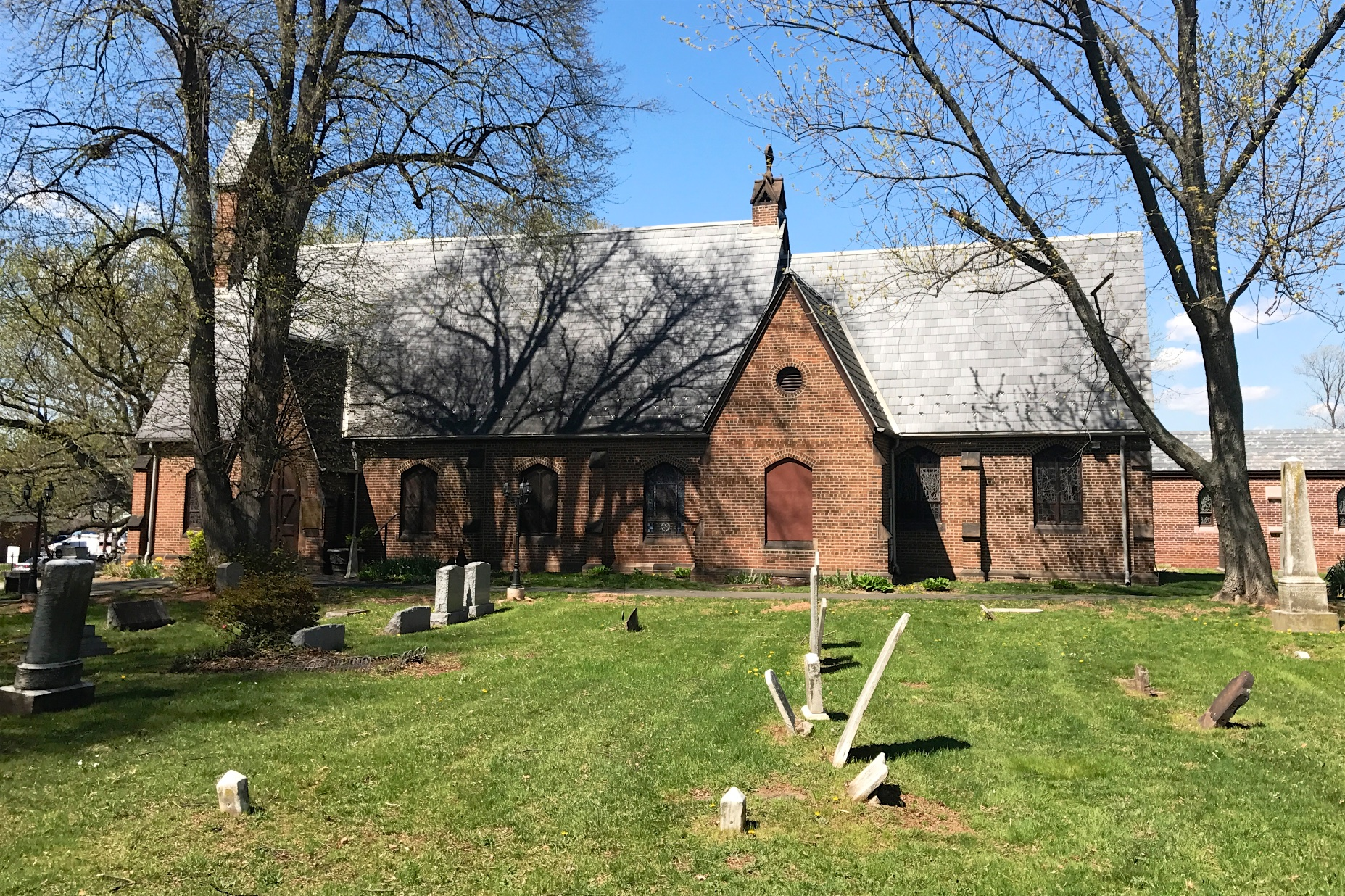
Churchyard

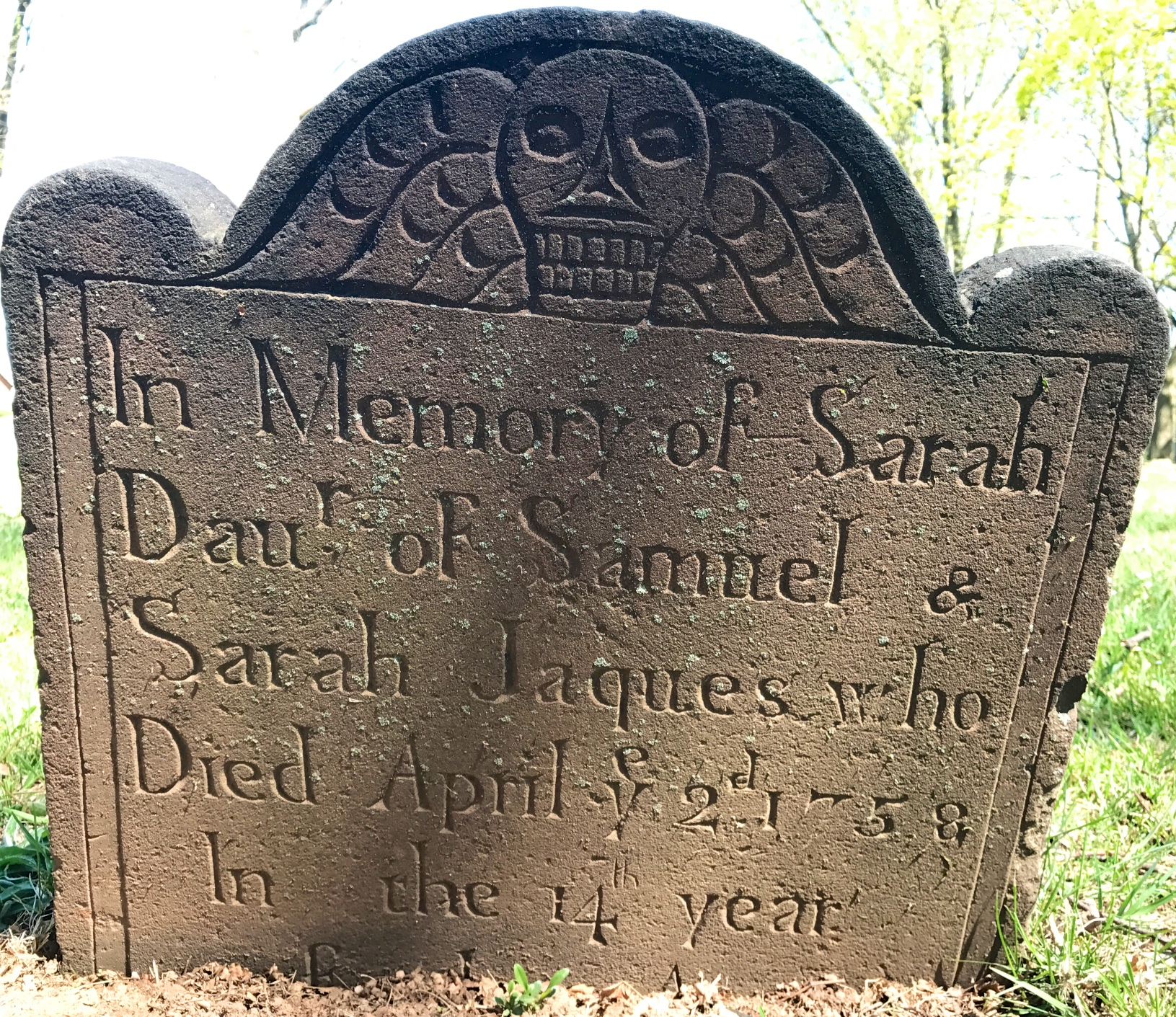
1758 tombstone

== See also ==
- National Register of Historic Places listings in Middlesex County, New Jersey
- Jonathan Singletary Dunham House – Rectory
- First Presbyterian Church and Cemetery – adjacent church, at 600 Rahway Avenue
