= Jonathan Singletary Dunham House =

Historic house in New Jersey, United States

- U.S. Historic district – Contributing property
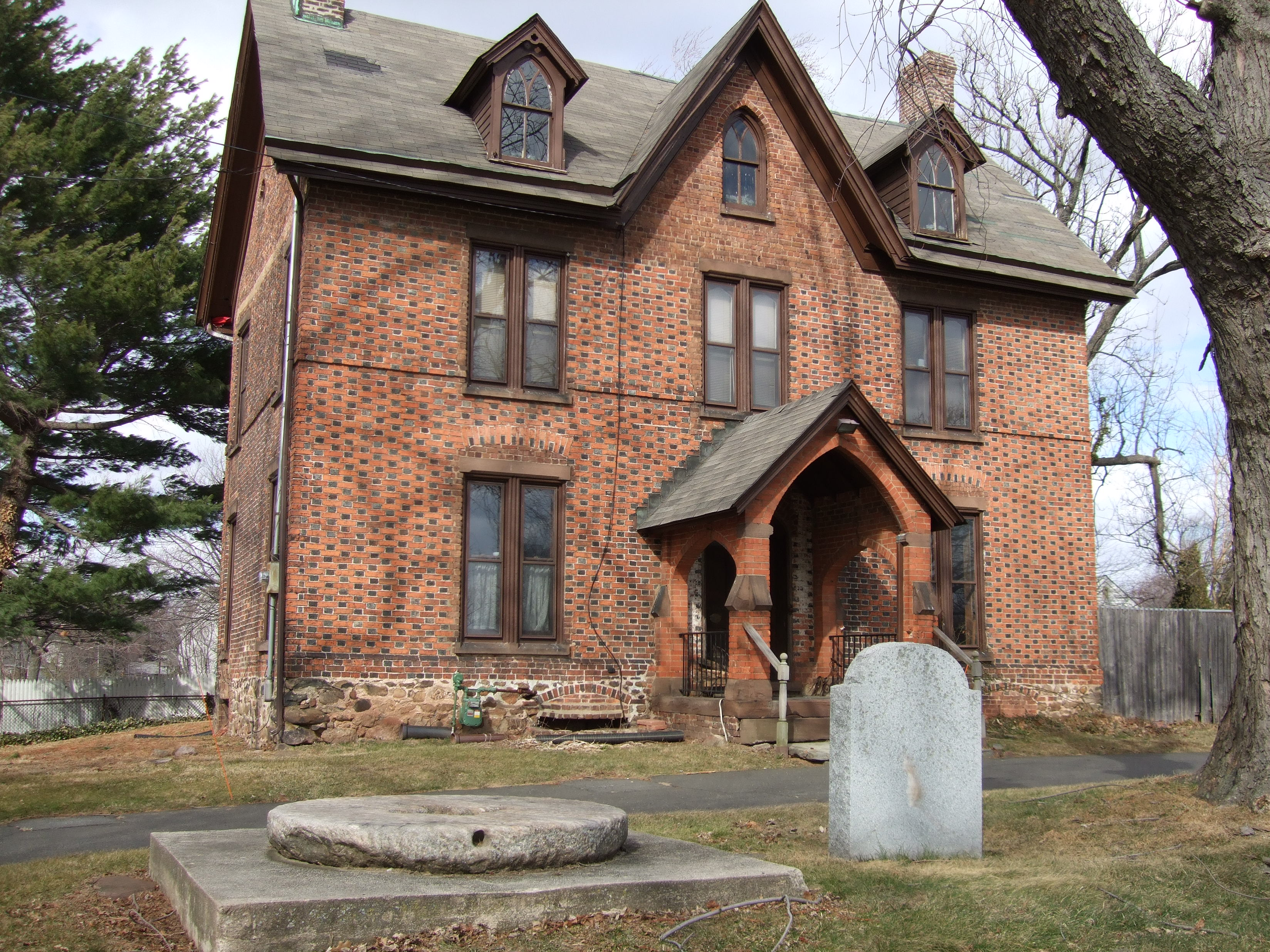
- Jonathan Dunham House and mill site in Woodbridge Township, New Jersey

- Location within Middlesex County, New Jersey Location within New Jersey Location within the United States
- Location: 650 Rahway Avenue, Woodbridge Township, New Jersey, U.S.
- Coordinates: 40°33′51″N 74°16′21″W
- Built: ca. 1709
- Architectural style: Gothic Revival, Colonial Revival
- Part of: Trinity Episcopal Church (ID04000431)
- Added to NRHP: May 12, 2004

Jonathan Singletary Dunham House, located in Woodbridge Township in Middlesex County, New Jersey, the state's first township, chartered on June 1, 1669, by King Charles II, is a house that was built around 1709 by Jonathan Singletary Dunham (January 17, 1640 – September 6, 1724), an early American settler and freeholder who built the first gristmill in New Jersey nearby the house.

Jonathan Dunham was born in Newbury, Massachusetts and married Mary Bloomfield with whom he later moved to present day New Jersey. Bloomfield is a relative of Joseph Bloomfield, Governor of New Jersey, for whom the township of Bloomfield, New Jersey is named. After building the first gristmill in New Jersey, he went on to serve the community in a variety of ways and was elected to the New Jersey Provincial Congress in 1673. Jonathan Singletary Dunham is the 8th great-grandfather of President Barack Obama though the direct paternal line of his mother Ann Dunham.

== History ==
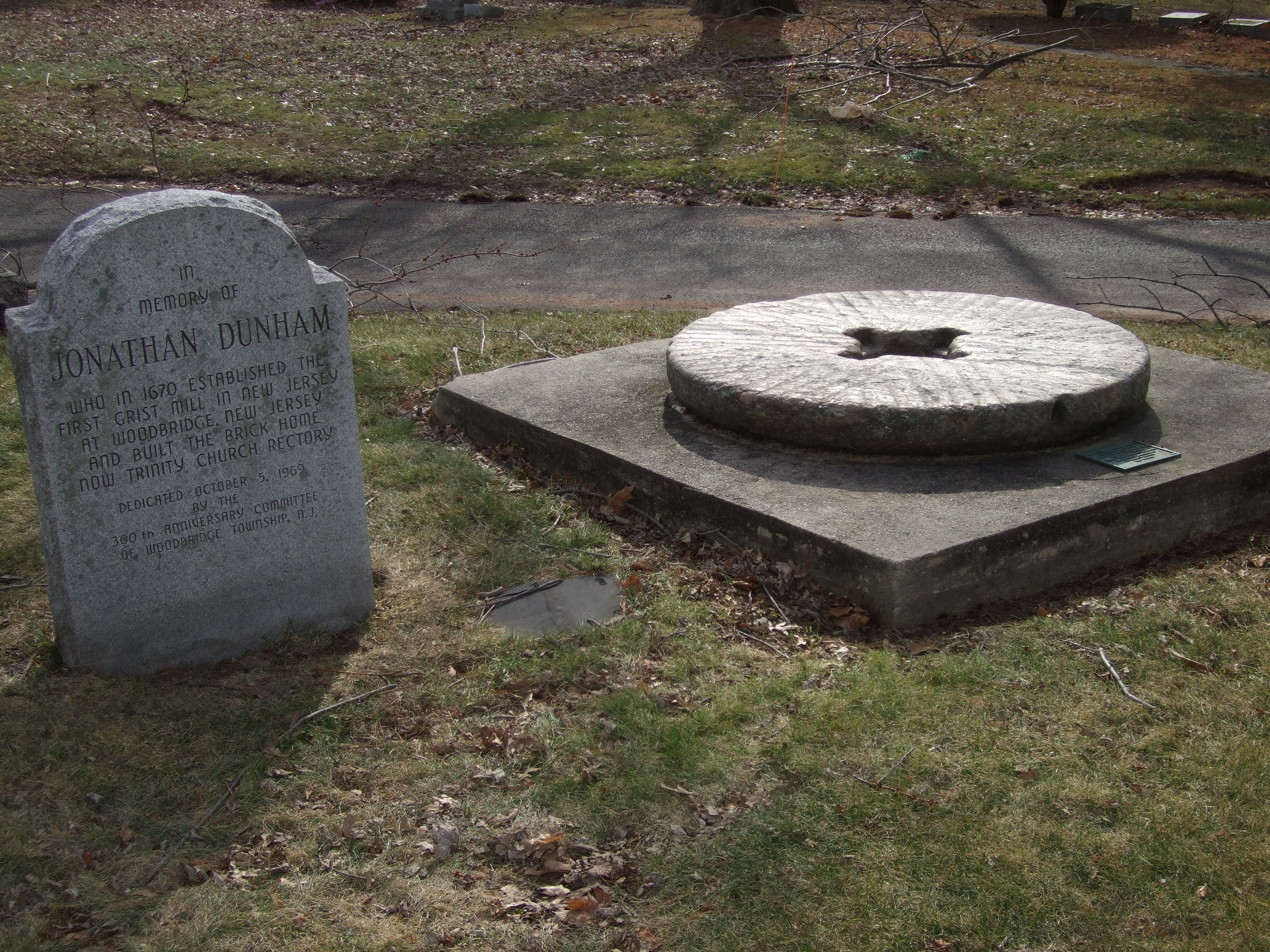
Memorial to Jonathan Dunham in Woodbridge, NJ and an original mill stone used in the first gristmill in New Jersey

The 213 acres (0.86 km^{2}) of land upon which the house and gristmill were built was granted to Jonathan Dunham by the newly appointed Governor of New Jersey. The Dunham house is the oldest building in Woodbridge Township, and among the oldest buildings in Middlesex County. Originally a two-story, four room home, the house was built with brick from Holland which had been used as ballast in ships. The Flemish bond brickwork, also known as Dutch bond, makes a distinctive checkerboard pattern that is visible on the first and second floors of the façade. The house was used as a garrison by American soldiers during the American Revolution. The mill, a tidal mill, was located just south of the home, along the Woodbridge River, which was then known as Papiack Creek, at the intersection of the Port Reading Avenue.

== Today ==
Since 1873, the home has been part of the grounds of Trinity Episcopal Church, listed on the New Jersey and national registers of historic places. Jonathan's youngest son, Benjamin Dunham, is recognized as a founder of the church, and the house his father built now serves as the Rectory. One of the original circular millstones used by Dunham in his grist mill operations still exists and is displayed on the property.

== See also ==
- First Presbyterian Church and Cemetery
