= Clinton Historic District (Clinton, New Jersey) =

Historic district in New Jersey, United States

- U.S. National Register of Historic Places
- U.S. Historic district
- New Jersey Register of Historic Places
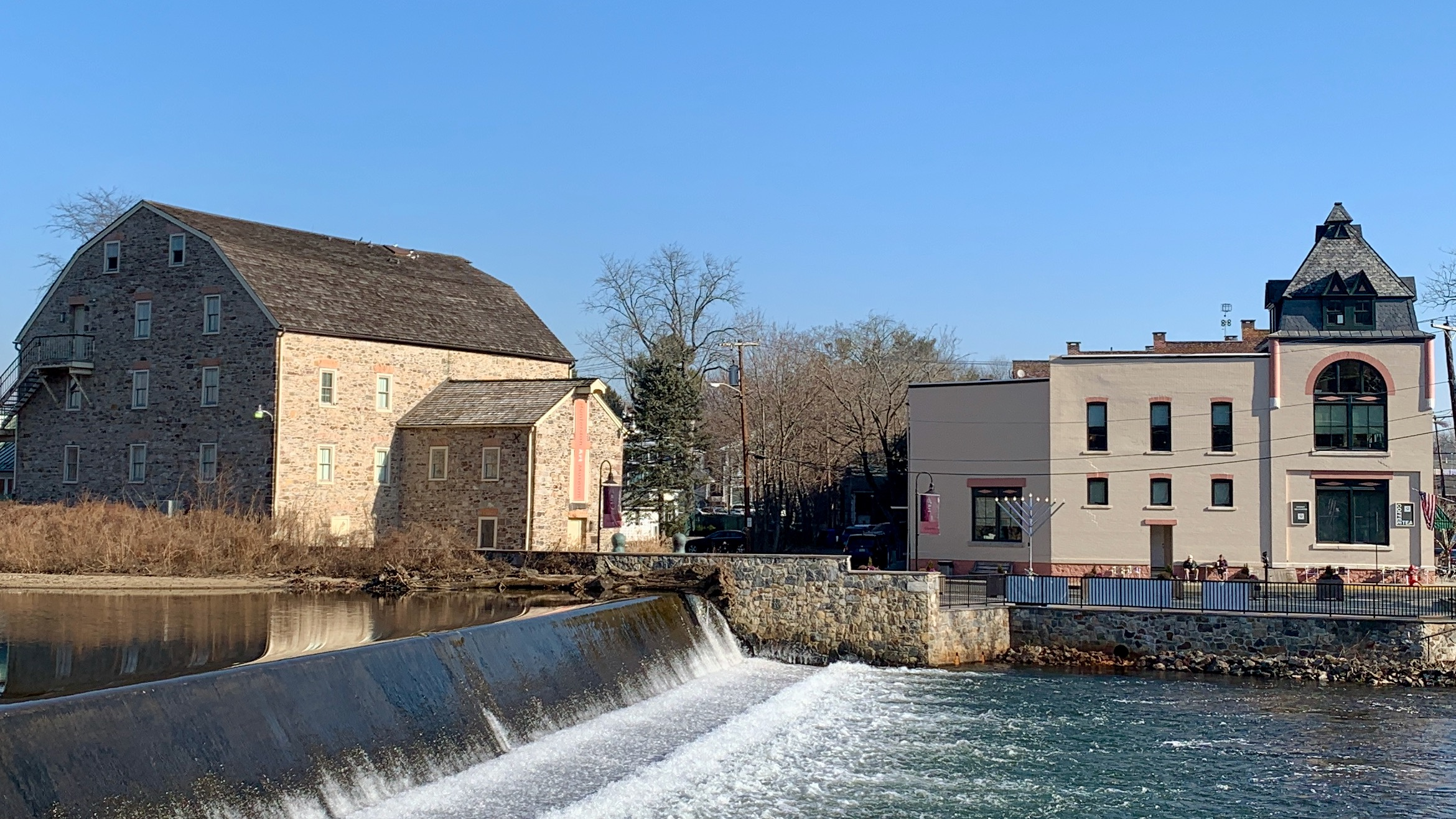
- Hunterdon Art Museum and the Duckworth Building

- Location within Hunterdon County, New Jersey Location within New Jersey Location within the United States
- Location: Center, West Main, Main, East Main, Halstead, Water, and Leigh streets, Clinton, New Jersey
- Coordinates: 40°38′17″N 74°54′37″W
- Area: 175 acres (71 ha)
- Architectural style: Federal, Greek Revival, Italianate, Late 19th And 20th Century Revivals
- NRHP reference No.: 95001101
- NJRHP No.: 2816

Significant dates
- Added to NRHP: September 28, 1995
- Designated NJRHP: March 3, 1995

The Clinton Historic District is a 175-acre (71 ha) historic district encompassing much of the town of Clinton in Hunterdon County, New Jersey. It was added to the National Register of Historic Places on September 28, 1995, for its significance in architecture, commerce, engineering, industry and exploration/settlement. The district includes 270 contributing buildings, one contributing structure, and three contributing sites. Five were previously listed on the NRHP individually: Dunham's Mill, M. C. Mulligan & Sons Quarry, Music Hall, Old Grandin Library, and Red Mill.

== History ==
The oldest buildings in the district are the two mills on opposite sides of the Clinton Dam on the South Branch Raritan River. The Red Mill, on the west, was built c. 1810 and Dunham's Mill, on the east, was built in 1837. The Clinton House is likely located at the site of an earlier 18th-century tavern. The district has three churches. The Presbyterian congregation formed in 1829 and built the current church in 1864. The Methodist congregation formed in 1832 and built the current church in 1863. Baptists built a church in 1872, but it was sold after membership declined and is now owned by Evangel Chapel. The Main Street Bridge, a Pratt truss bridge crossing the South Branch Raritan River, was designed by Francis C. Lowthorp and built in 1870 by William Cowin of Lambertville replacing an earlier bridge. On October 30, 1891, a major fire destroyed 23 buildings and 17 businesses on Main Street. This is known in Clinton as the Great Fire of 1891. The Duckworth Building and the Odd Fellows Hall on Main Street were built using brick after this fire.

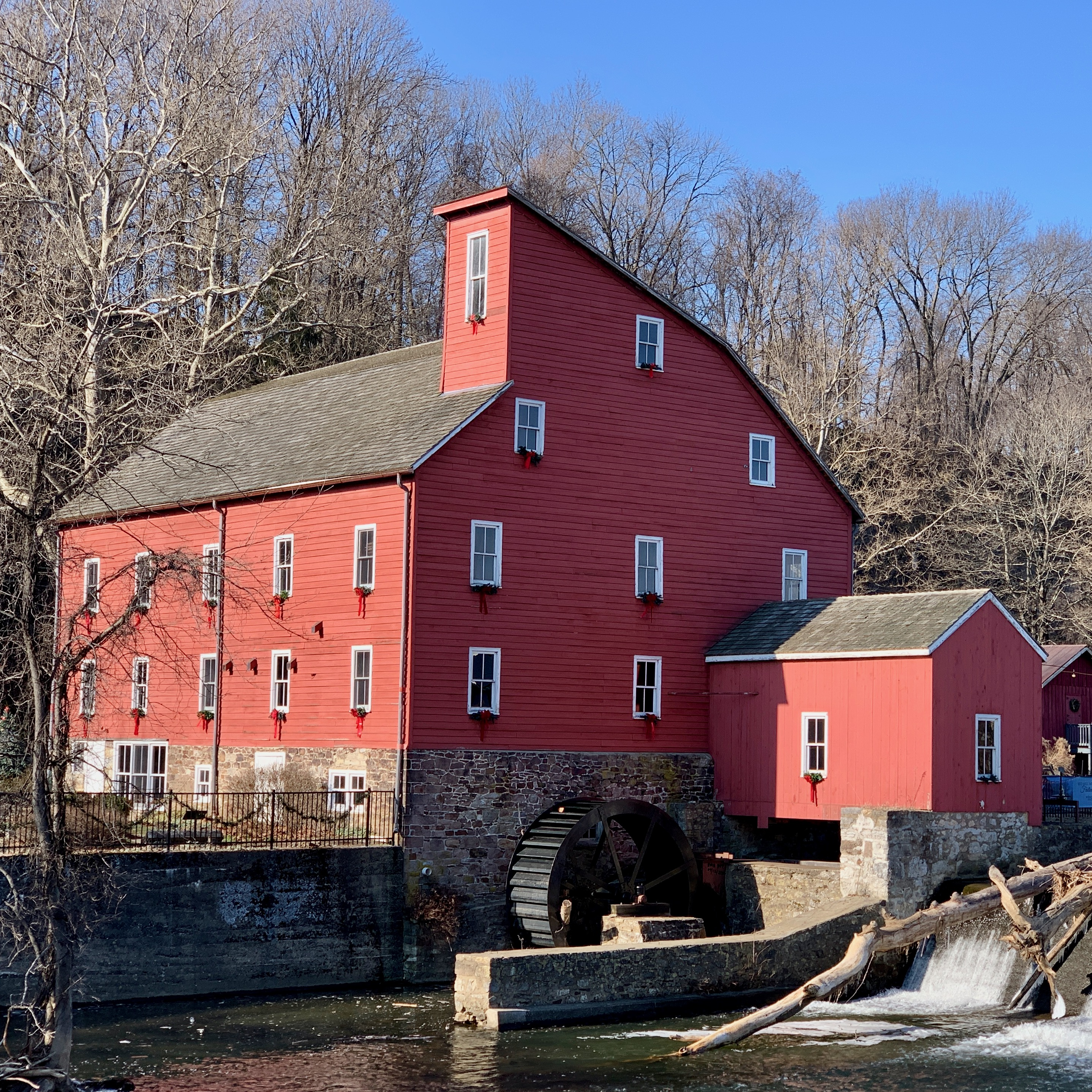
Red Mill

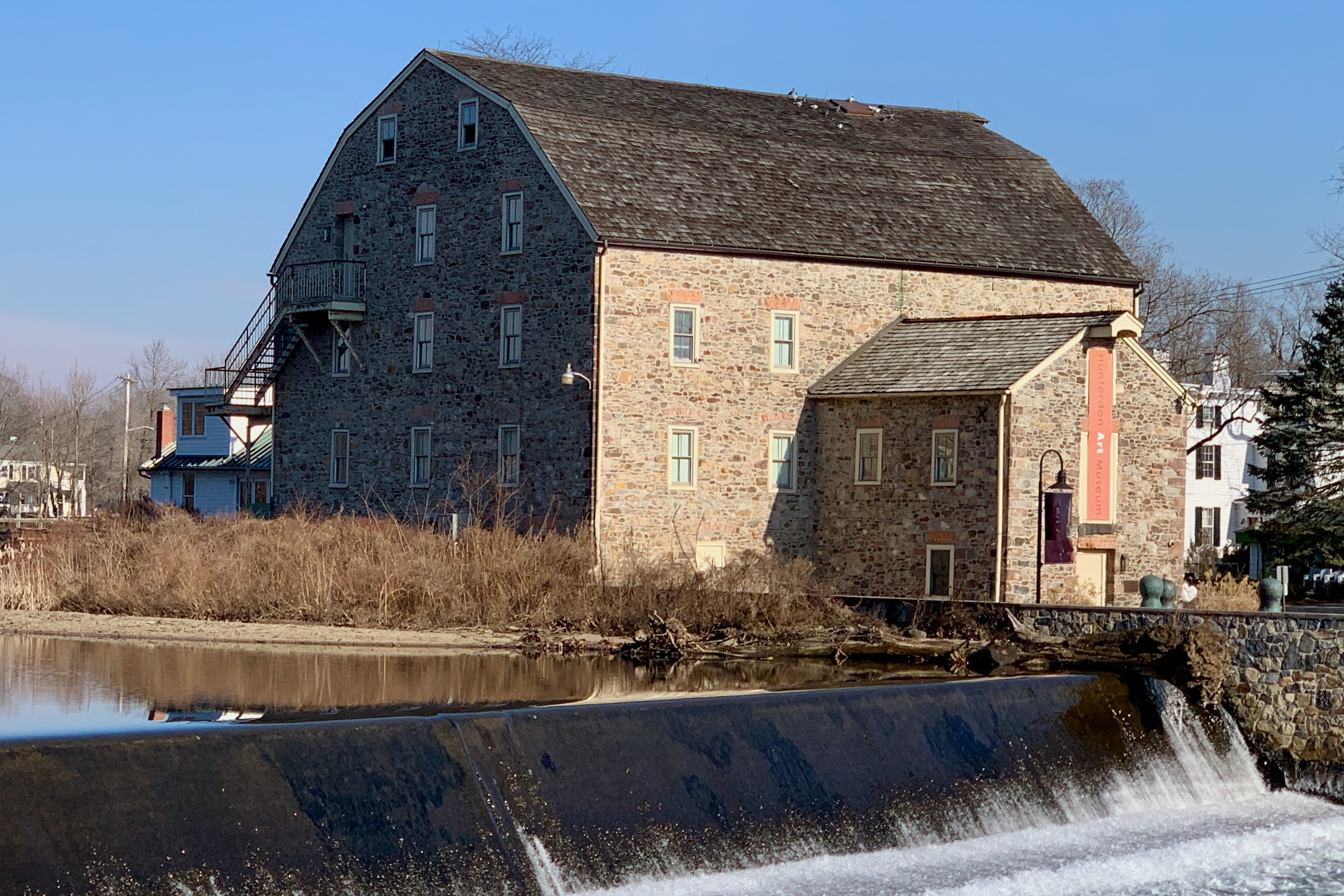
Dunham's Mill

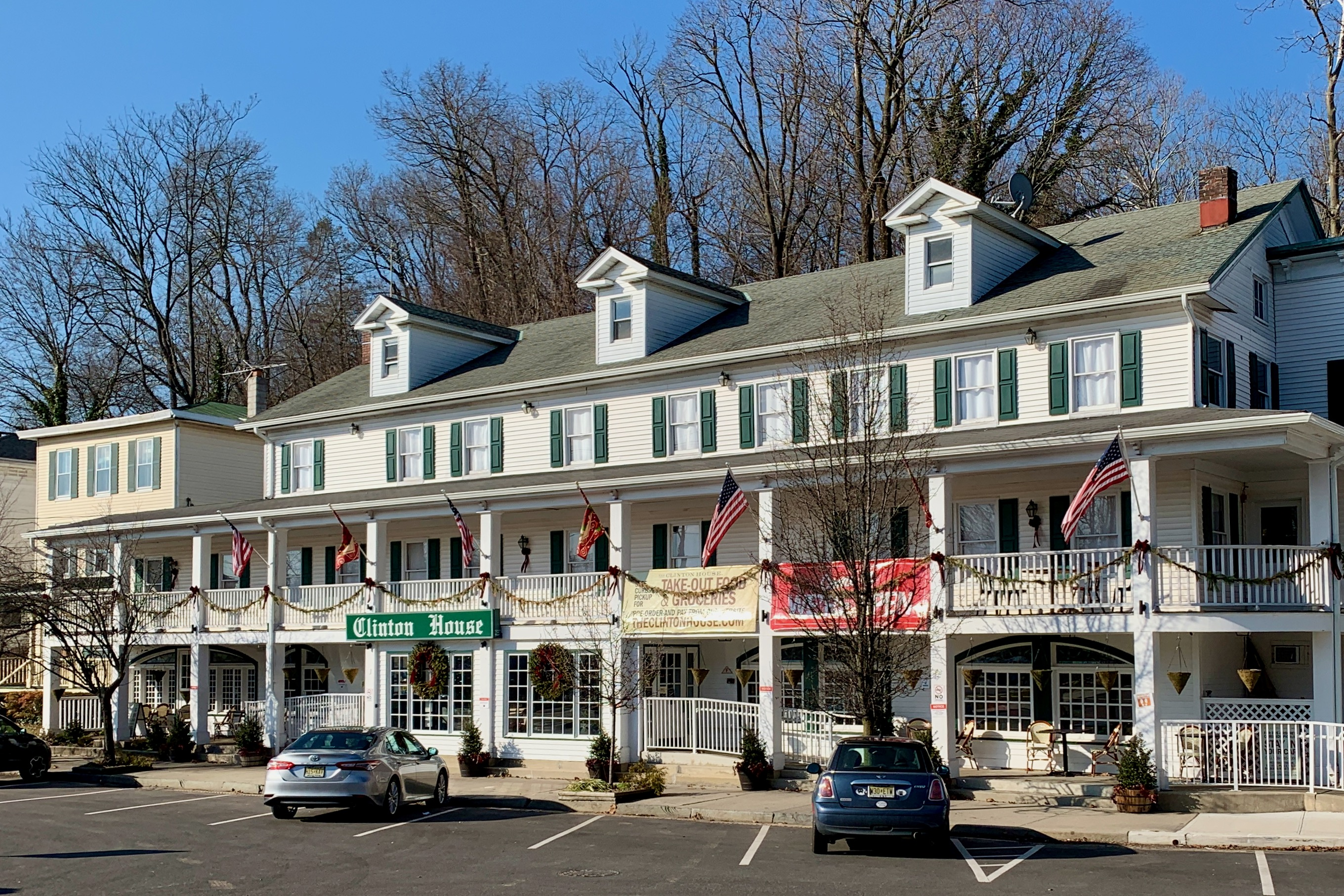
Clinton House

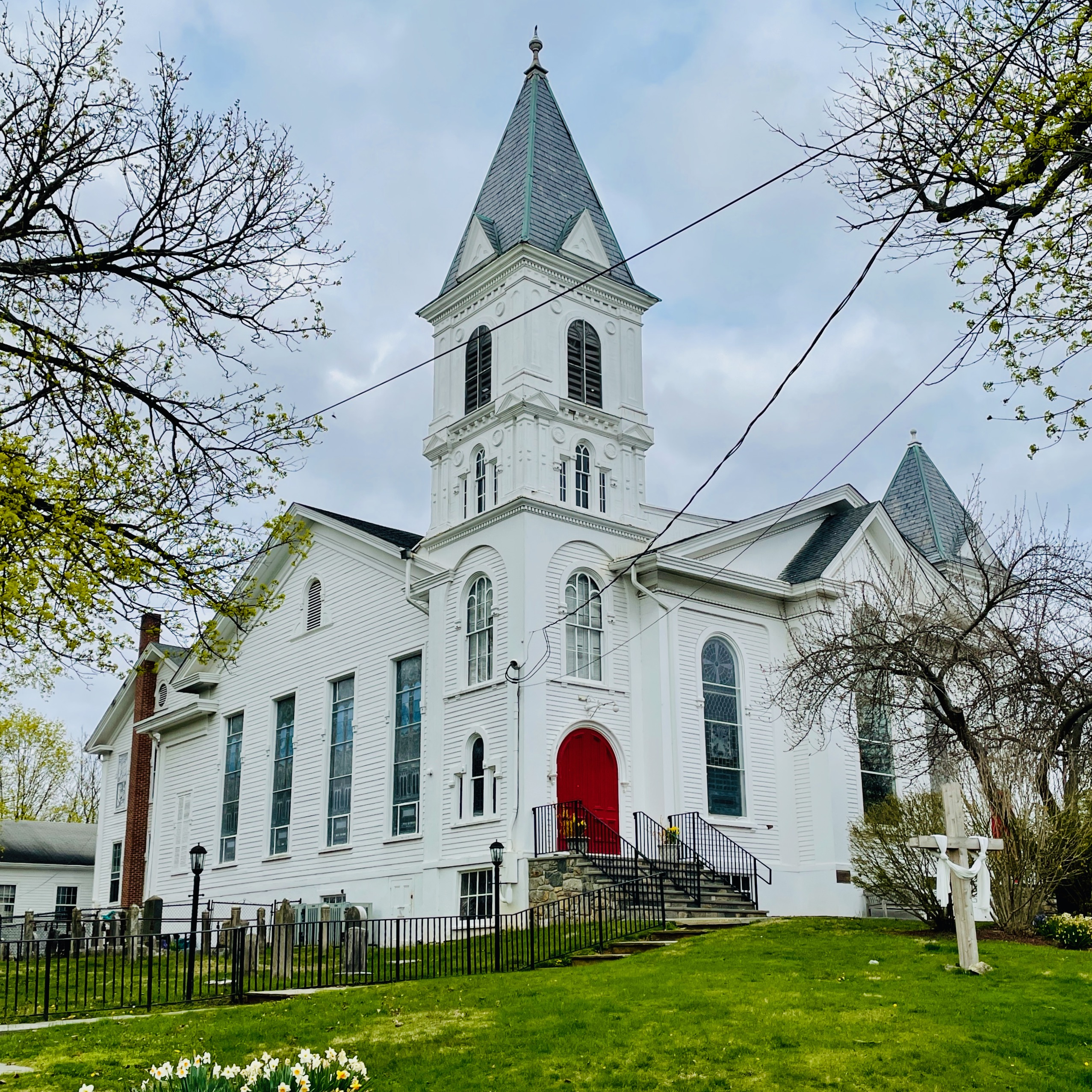
Presbyterian Church

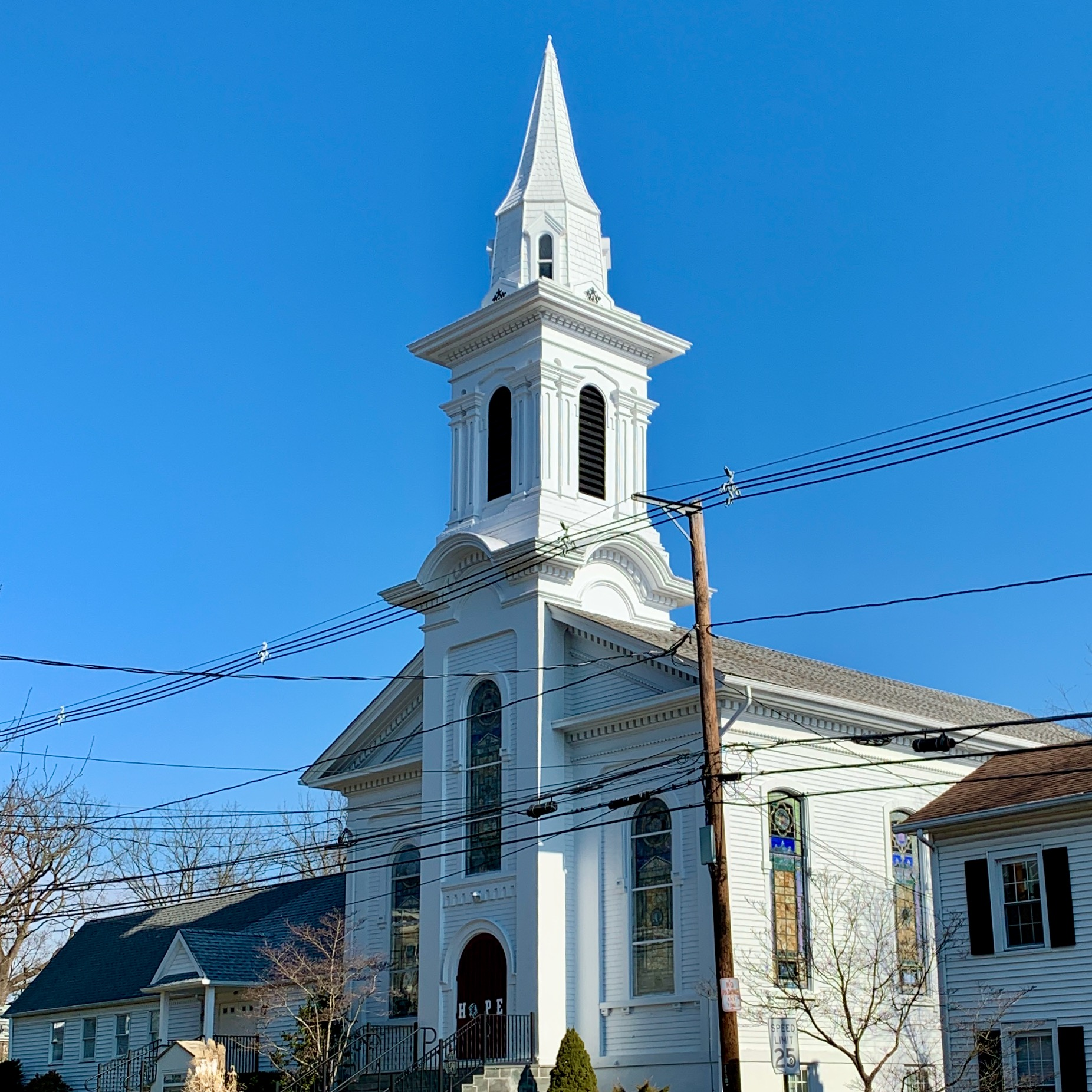
United Methodist Church

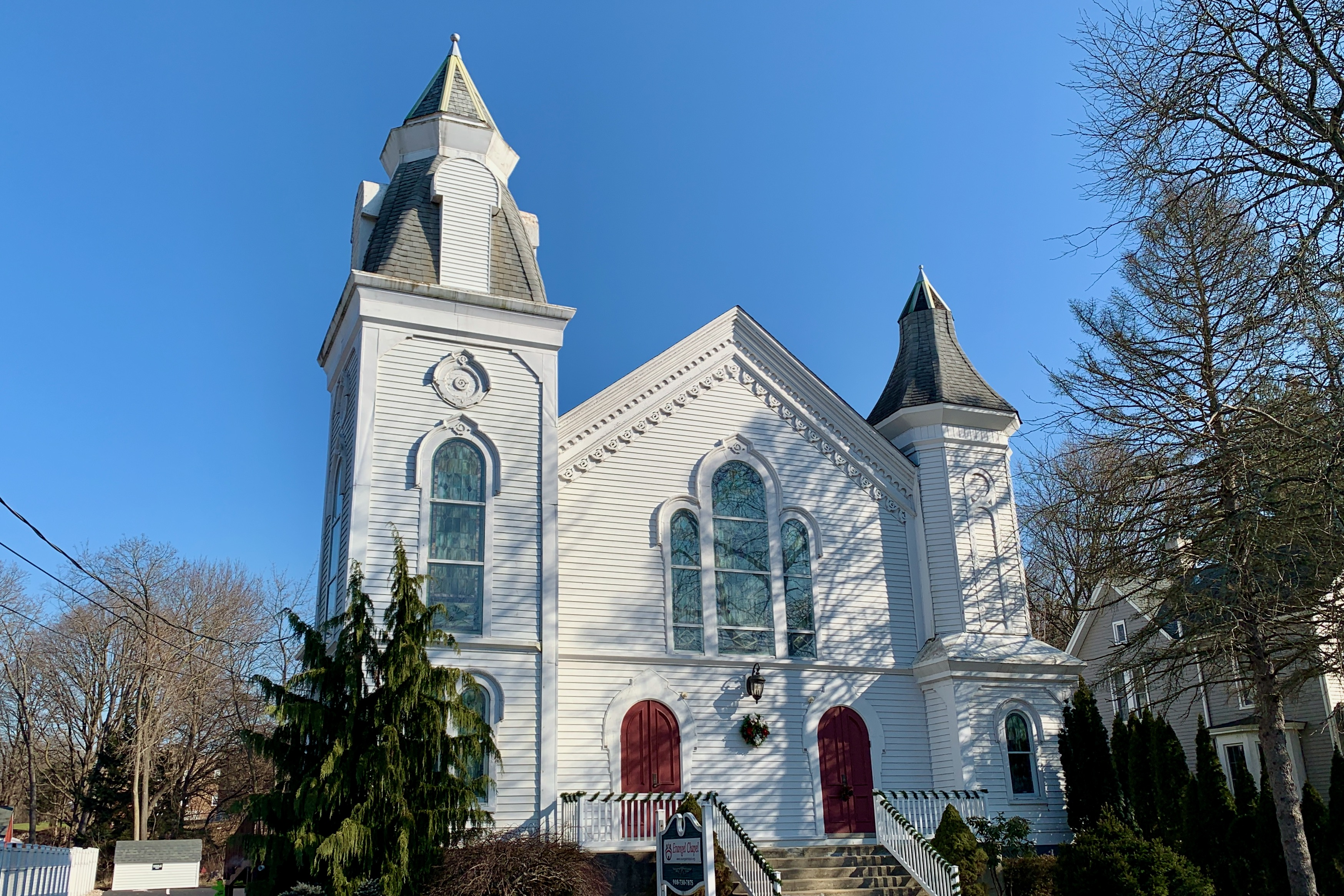
Former Baptist Church

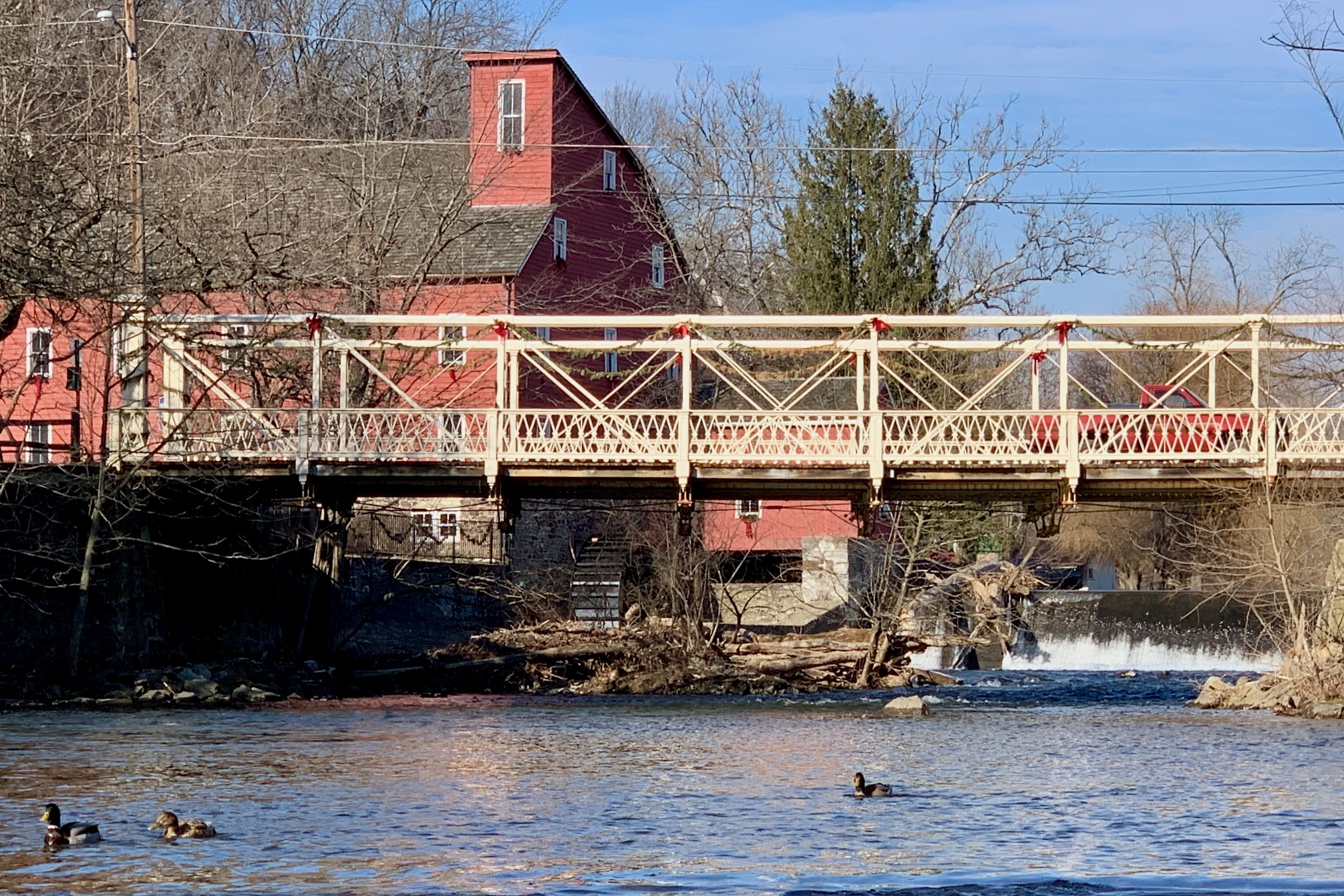
Main Street Bridge crossing the South Branch Raritan River

== Description ==
The house at 42-46 West Main Street features ornate gables. The house at 68 West Main Street shows Italianate style and features a spoke-filled circular window in the attic. The John Taylor Leigh Mansion, now the town municipal building, was built in 1861 with bricks made on the property. It features a full porch with Italianate columns. The Duckworth Building and the Odd Fellows Hall show Romanesque architecture features.

== Gallery ==
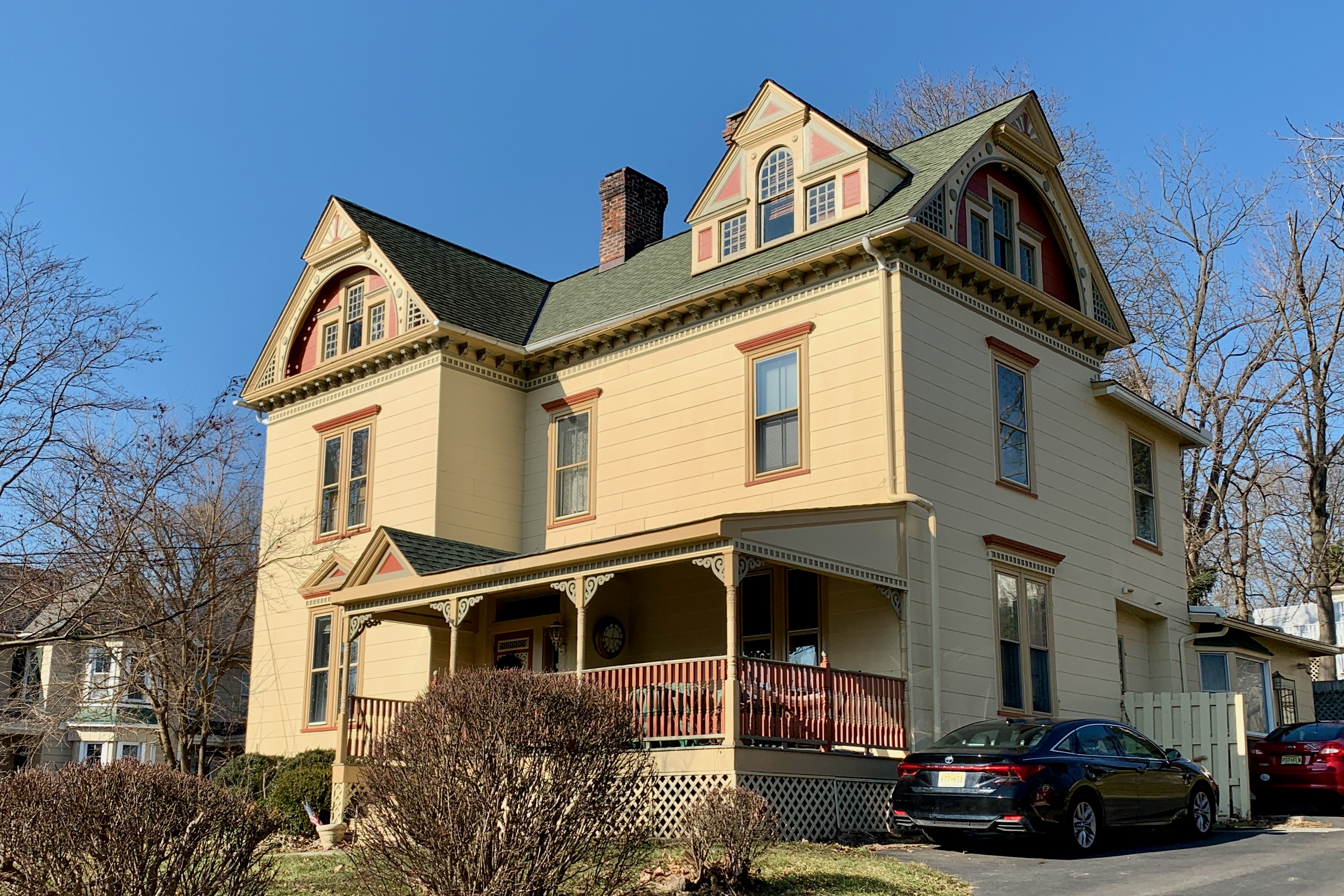
42-46 West Main Street

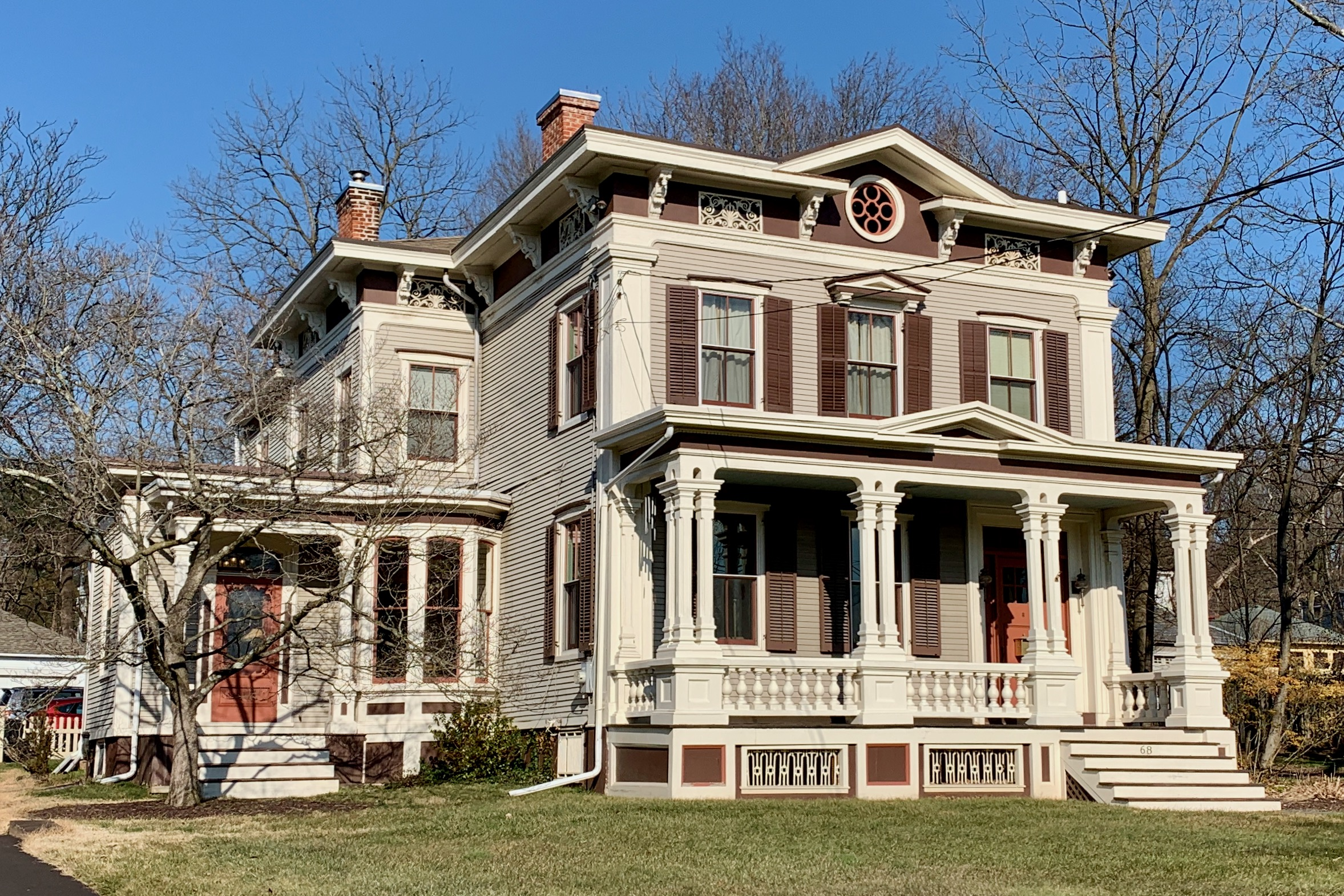
68 West Main Street

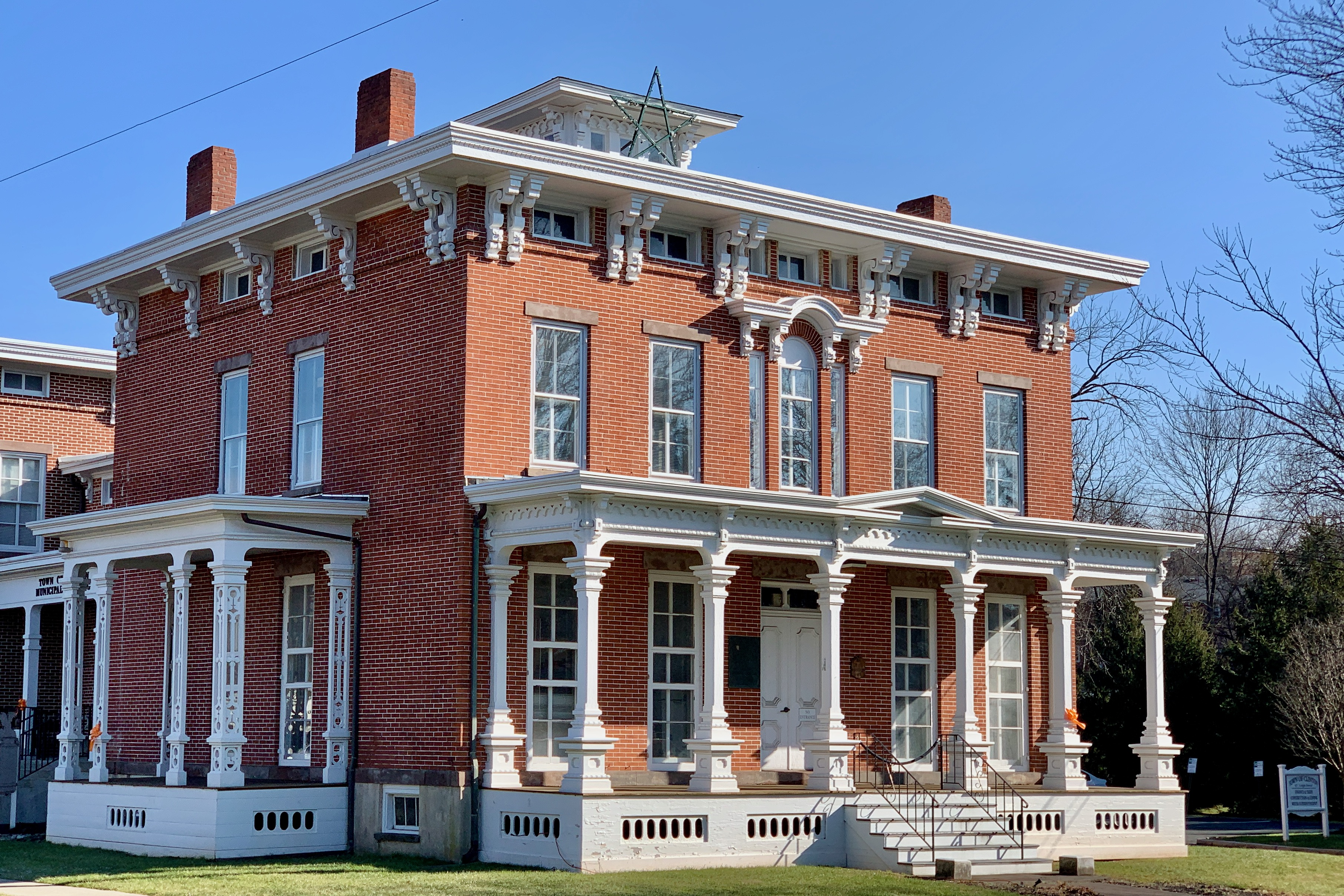
John Taylor Leigh Mansion, now the Municipal Building

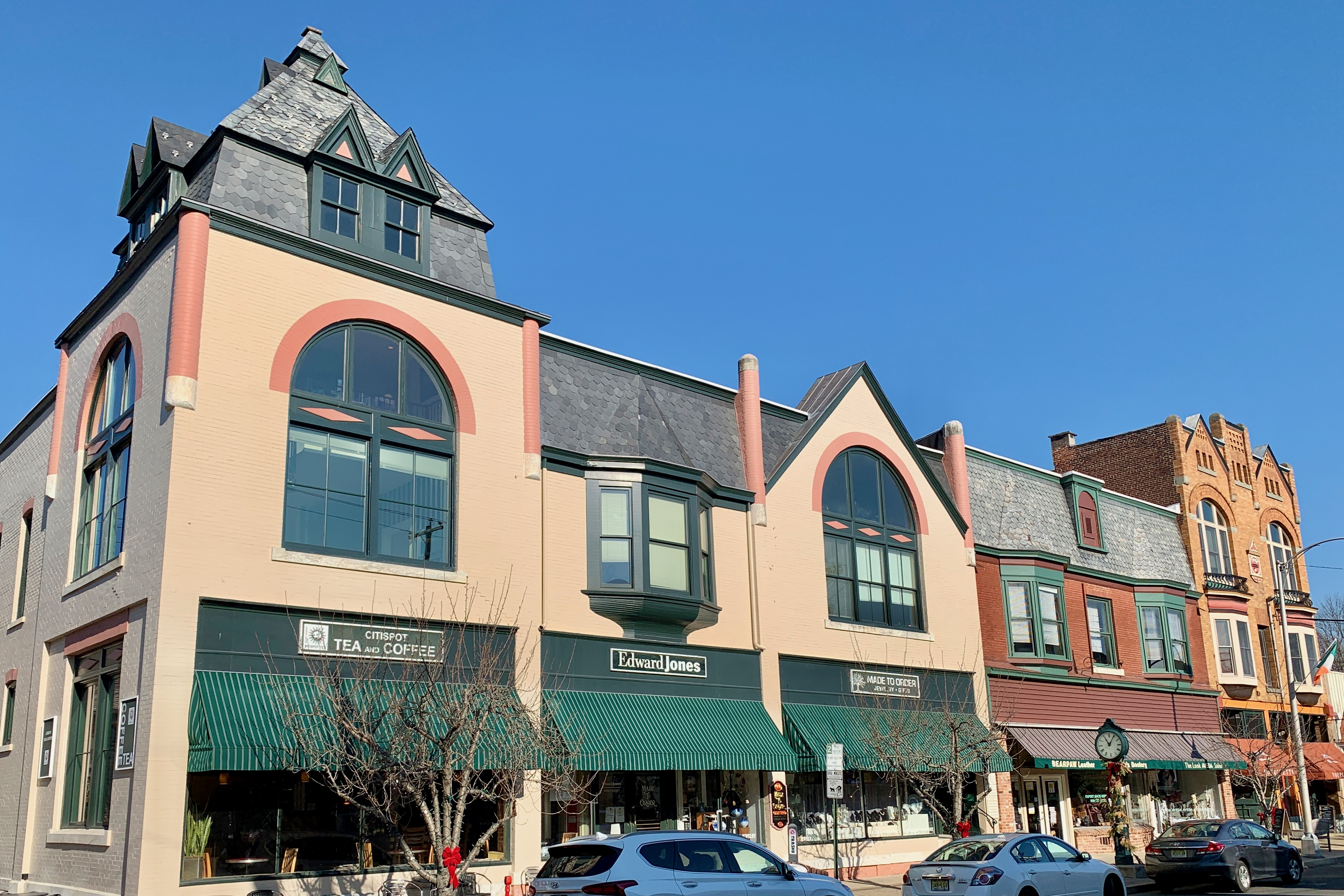
Duckworth Building and Odd Fellows Hall on Main Street

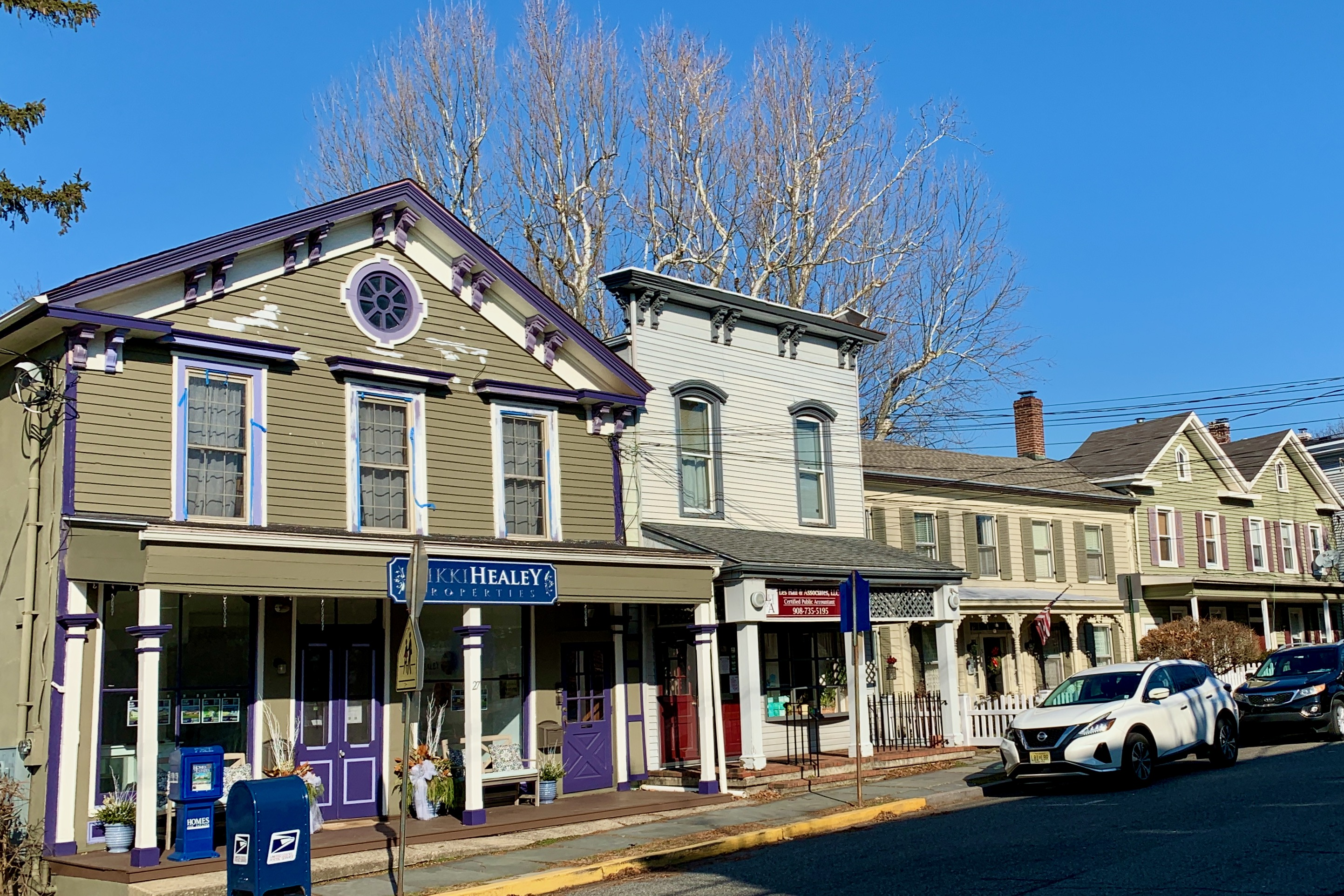
Center Street buildings

== See also ==
- National Register of Historic Places listings in Hunterdon County, New Jersey
