= Old Grandin Library =

- U.S. National Register of Historic Places
- U.S. Historic district – Contributing property
- New Jersey Register of Historic Places
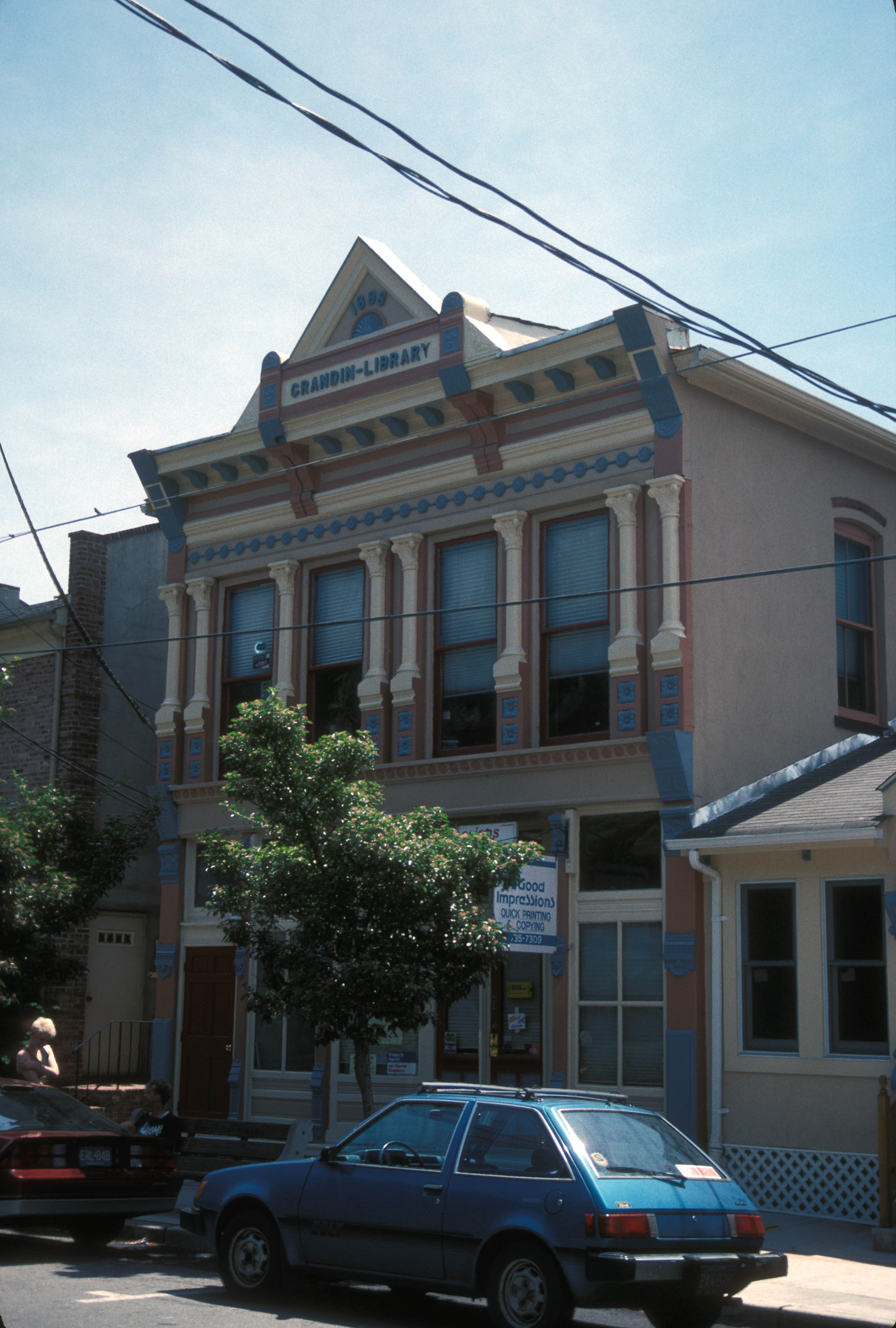

- Location within Hunterdon County, New Jersey Location within New Jersey Location within the United States
- Location: 12 East Main Street, Clinton, New Jersey
- Coordinates: 40°38′13″N 74°54′34″W
- Area: 0.1 acres (0.040 ha)
- Built: 1898
- Part of: Clinton Historic District (ID95001101)
- NRHP reference No.: 74001163
- NJRHP No.: 1572

Significant dates
- Added to NRHP: November 1, 1974
- Designated CP: September 28, 1995
- Designated NJRHP: August 8, 1974

The Old Grandin Library is a historic building located at 12 East Main Street in the town of Clinton in Hunterdon County, New Jersey. It was added to the National Register of Historic Places on November 1, 1974, for its significance in architecture and education. It was built in 1898, as a public library for the town with funds from the estate of Daniel Reading Grandin (1817–1892). In 1995, it was also listed as a contributing property of the Clinton Historic District.

== History and description ==
In 1898, Daniel Grandin bequeathed funds to establish the first public library in the community. Additional funding was provided by local philanthropist Ralph Garret Voorhees (1838–1907) and his wife Elizabeth Nevius Rodman Vorhees (1841–1924). The first floor was used as a municipal office and fire department. The library was on the second floor and remained in use until the 1960s. The façade is cast iron on the first floor and pressed metal on the second floor.

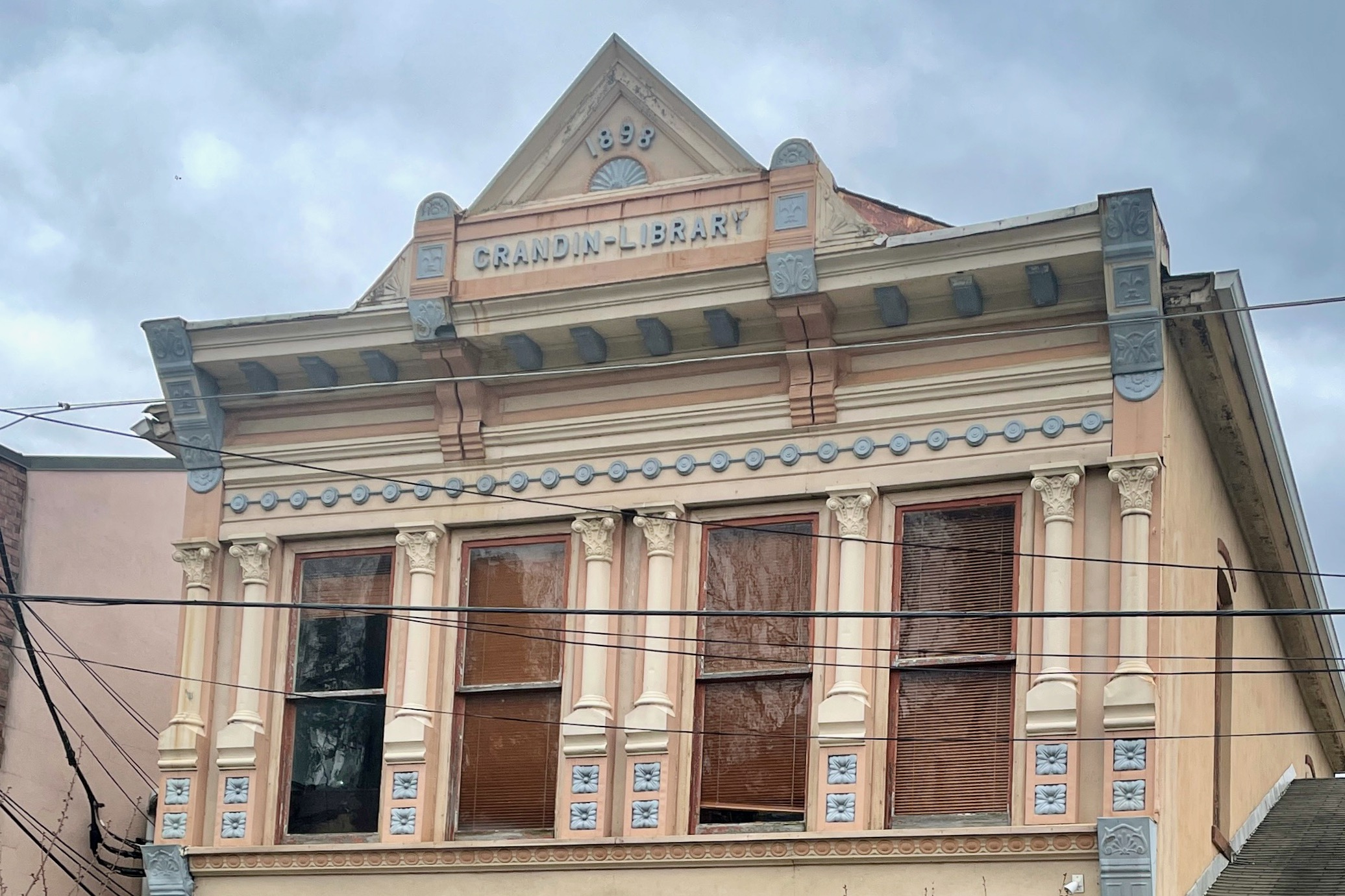
Second floor façade

== See also ==
- National Register of Historic Places listings in Hunterdon County, New Jersey
