= Jack Dunham (psychologist) =

American psychologist

- Born: August 24, 1938; Albion, Illinois, United States
- Died: March 20, 1992 (aged 53)
- Education: Portland State College; University of Southern California
- Scientific career
- Fields: Experimental Psychology and Educational Psychology
- Workplaces: University of Texas, Austin
- Doctoral advisor: J.P. Guilford

Jack Dunham was an American psychologist.

== Educational background ==
Dunham grew up in Albion, IL- a town in the southern part of Illinois. Dunham received his B.A. degree from Portland State College in 1962 and his PhD from the University of Southern California in 1966. He studied at USC with Dr. J.P. Guilford. In his doctorate, Dunham and Guilford worked with the concept of intelligence, and developing factor structures that compose this construct. Dunham accepted a position as a faculty member with University of Texas, Austin in Educational Psychology. At the University of Texas, Dunham ran a computer-assisted instruction laboratory and continued studying how we learn concepts.

== Psychology lineage ==
Dunham was a student of J.P. Guilford, who received his doctorate from Cornell University in Psychology in 1927. Guilford was a descendant of Edward B. Titchener. Titchener received his doctorate from the University of Leipzig in 1892 in Psychology and studied under Wilhelm Wundt, the father of psychology. Wundt Received his medical degree from the University of Heidelberg in 1856.

In his doctorate, Dunham worked closely with J.P. Guilford on developing the factor structure of intelligence. Guilford was known for his “Guilford Structure of Intellect”, where he presented more than 150 different intellectual abilities, along three main dimensions: (1) Operations, (2) Content, and (3) Products. However, Dunham found at least two distinct factors within Guilford’s factor structure Content domain: (1) Figural- Concrete, real world information, tangible objects—things in the environment. It includes visual: information perceived through seeing; auditory: information perceived through hearing; and kinesthetic: information perceived through one's own physical actions. (2) Symbolic- Information perceived as symbols or signs that stand for something else, e.g., Arabic numerals, the letters of an alphabet, or musical and scientific notations.

Beyond working with Guilford, Dunham was considered the pioneer in incorporating computers in education. He brought together government agencies, educational institutions, and computer companies to exchange information on the use of computers.

== Summary of publications ==
1. Guilford, Dunham, & Hoepfner (1967): Presents the importance of Intelligence factors (a) visual-figural (line-drawings); (b) symbolic (letters); and (c) semantic (meaningful words). Also discusses when a process is viewed as “problem solving”, as when an individual uses whatever resources may address the problem.
2. Dunham, Guilford, & Hoepfner (1968): The idea of concept learning is presented, which refers to one’s ability to improve with each attempt at a similar task. Dunham simultaneously discusses “trial and error” as a way to problem solve. In this article, Dunham uses factor analysis to explain how learning task scores relate to one’s intellectual ability.
3. Dunham & Bunderson (1969): Exploration of how different types of instruction, specifically the “decision-rule instruction (DRI)” and “no-rule instruction (NRI)” impact problem solving abilities on tasks.
4. Reeve, Polson & Dunham (1970): Reeve explores the idea of concept development, and proposes a revision from a two factor model to a four factor model.
5. Meyers & Dunham (1971): Anxiety and task involvement were measured, to determine their role in one’s aptitude and performance ability. Measures used included memory span and performance ability, and were used in transfer conditions

== Professional affiliations ==
1. American Association for the Advancement of Science
2. Southwest Psychological Association
