= First Presbyterian Church and Cemetery =

Historic church in New Jersey, United States

- U.S. National Register of Historic Places
- New Jersey Register of Historic Places
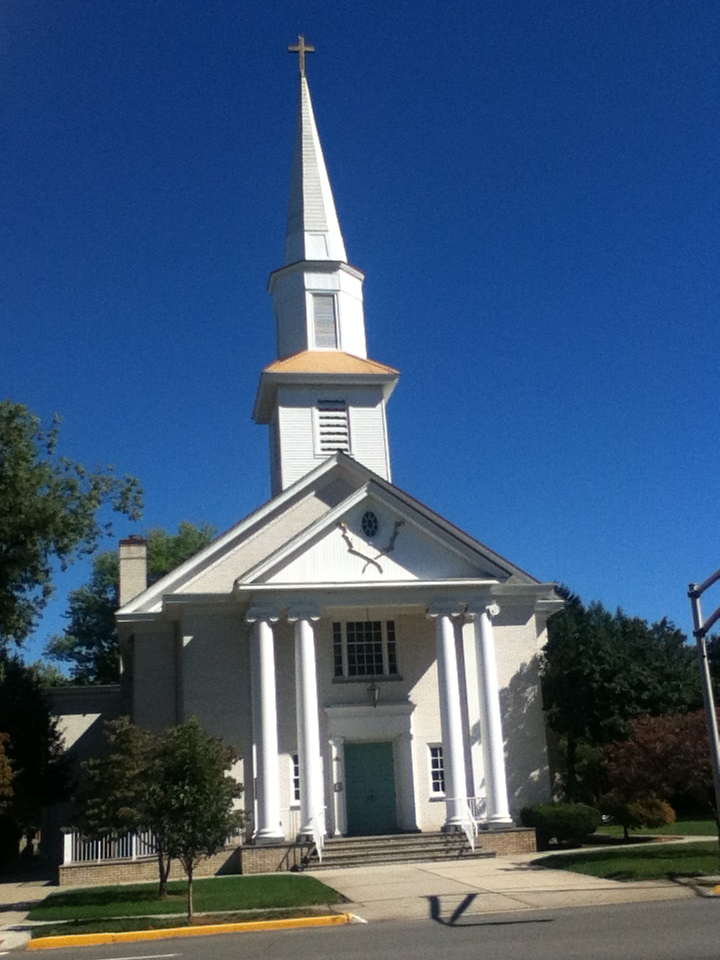

- Location within Middlesex County, New Jersey Location within New Jersey Location within the United States
- Location: 600 Rahway Avenue, Woodbridge Township, New Jersey
- Coordinates: 40°33′42″N 74°16′24″W
- Area: 5.2 acres (2.1 ha)
- Built: 1803
- Architect: Jonathan Freeman
- Architectural style: Greek Revival, Classical Revival
- NRHP reference No.: 08000363
- NJRHP No.: 4594

Significant dates
- Added to NRHP: May 2, 2008
- Designated NJRHP: January 25, 2008

The First Presbyterian Church is located at 600 Rahway Avenue in Woodbridge Township of Middlesex County, New Jersey, United States. The congregation was founded in 1675. The main part of the church building was completed in 1803. The property, listed as the First Presbyterian Church and Cemetery, was added to the National Register of Historic Places on May 2, 2008, for its significance in art, politics/government, and religion. The historic church was designed and built by Jonathan Freeman, a member of the congregation.

== Cemetery ==
First Presbyterian Cemetery
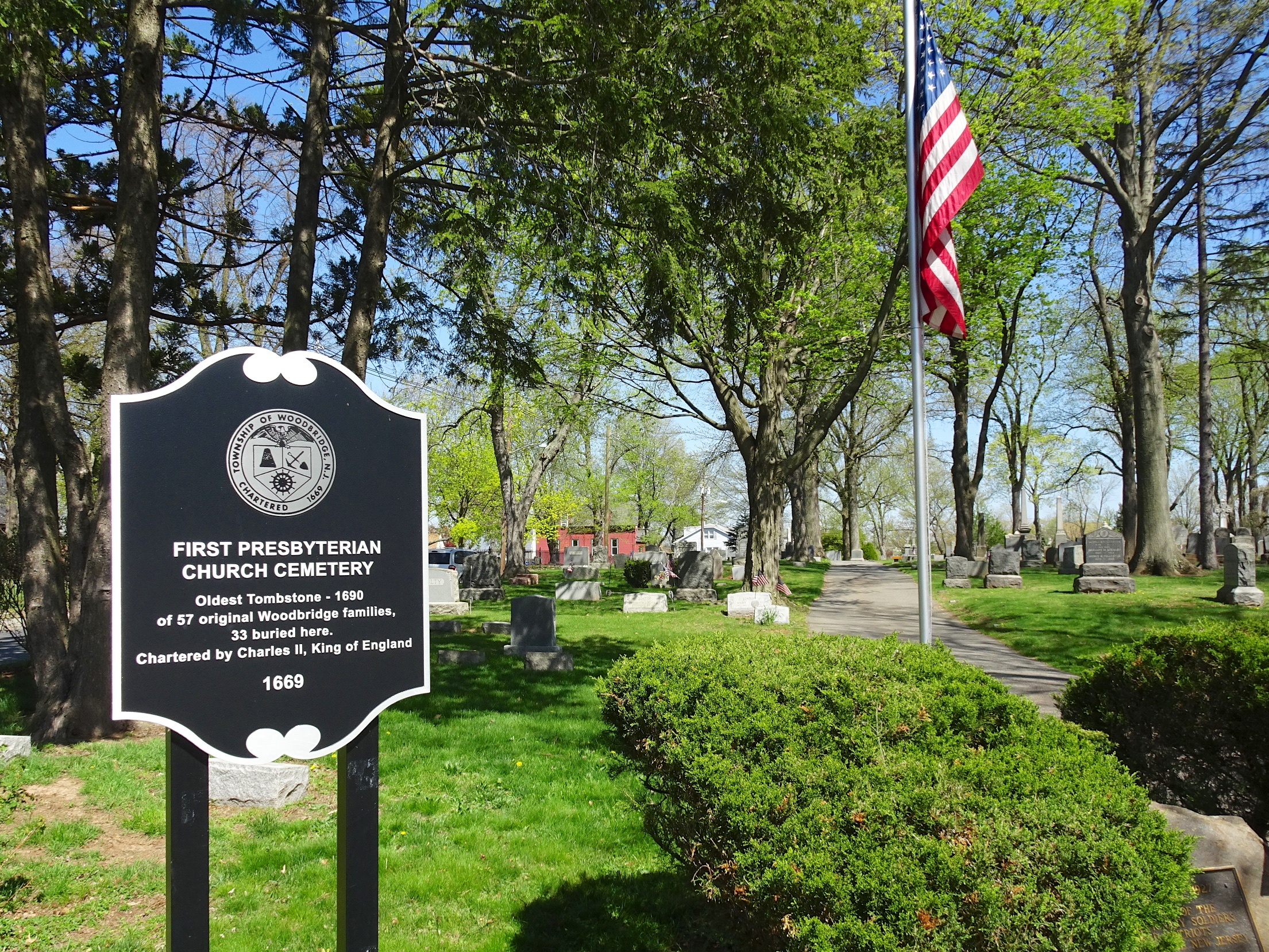
- Cemetery information sign
- Interactive map of First Presbyterian Cemetery

Details
- Established: 1690
- Find a Grave: First Presbyterian Cemetery

The oldest headstone in the churchyard cemetery dates from 1690.

== See also ==
- National Register of Historic Places listings in Middlesex County, New Jersey
- Archibald Riddell (minister)
- Trinity Episcopal Church – adjacent church, at 650 Rahway Avenue
- List of cemeteries in New Jersey
