= Urban Duniam =

Australian rules footballer

Personal information
- Full name: Irwin William Duniam
- Born: 29 May 1931
- Died: 18 March 2003 (aged 71); St Andrew's Hospital, Adelaide, South Australia
- Height: 185 cm (6 ft 1 in)
- Weight: 91 kg (201 lb)

Playing career^{1}
Years	Club	Games (Goals)
1950	South Melbourne	1 (0)
- ^{1} Playing statistics correct to the end of 1950.

Irwin William "Urban" Duniam (29 May 1931 – 18 March 2003) was an Australian rules footballer who played with South Melbourne in the Victorian Football League (VFL).
