= Dunham Township =

Dunham Township may refer to the following townships in the United States:

- Dunham Township, McHenry County, Illinois
- Dunham Township, Ohio
