= Denham (brand) =

Clothing brand

- Type: Subsidiary
- Industry: Fashion
- Founded: 2008
- Founder: Jason Denham
- Products: Denim
- Owner: Trendy Group

Denham is a premium jeans manufacturer owned by the Trendy Group, a Chinese conglomerate. It was founded in 2008 by the English jean maker Jason Denham in Amsterdam.

== History ==
Denham was founded in 2008 by the English jean maker Jason Denham in Amsterdam. The company's original jean was made using sashiko indigo and traditional Japanese techniques was inspired by a piece Denham discovered in a Japanese vintage store.

In 2014, the company opened a "denim bar" concept featuring exclusively women's jeans in Amsterdam's Negen Straatjes.

In 2016, the company had 20 stores in Japan and announced a joint venture in Japan with Look Incorporated with the aim of opening 50 stores by 2020. The company was acquired by Amlon Capital, a Dutch investment fund, the same year.

In 2017, it announced a joint venture in China with Trendy as its Chinese partner.

The company released a series of 10 capsule collections in 2018 to celebrate its 10th anniversary. One of the items was a sake made by Hiro, inspired by the brand's original 2008 launch gift to first customers, and was revived for the 10th anniversary as an indigo-blue sake using extracts from an edible blue Japanese flower.

In 2019. Trendy Group, the Chinese fashion company which had previously operated a joint venture with Denham in China, took majority control of the company from Amlon Capital in 2019.

In 2019, Denham released a collection in collaboration with Candiani Denim in Milan. In 2021, Denham released a capsule collection honoring Japanese denim craftsmanship and the company's original source of inspiration.

The company launched a collection of 100% Made in Italy denim starting in the spring/summer 2022 season in collaboration with Candiani Denim, C&S Jeans, and Le Group.

In 2024, the company outfitted Team Netherlands at the 2024 Summer Olympics.
