= Mikel Dunham =

American novelist

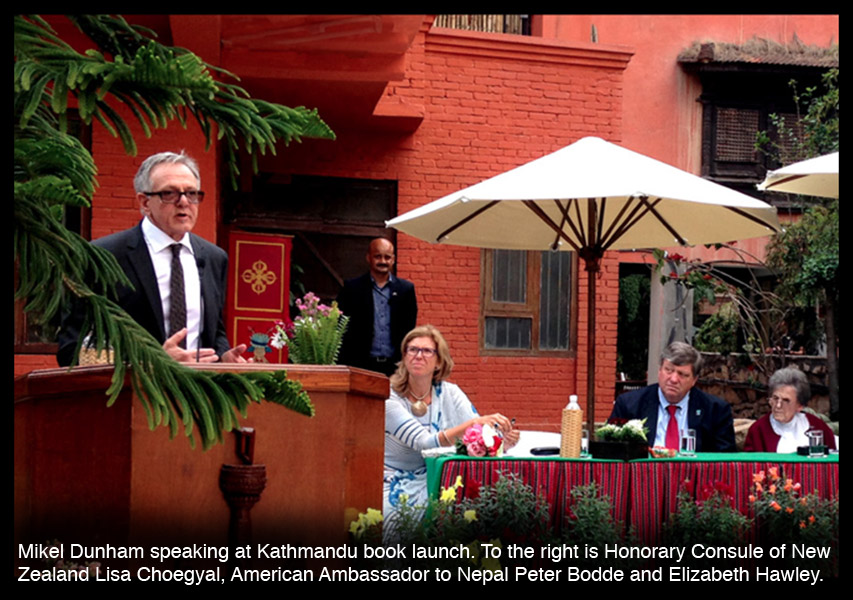
Mikel Dunham speaking at book launch of Elizabeth Hawley's "The Nepal Scene" with Lisa Choegyal, Ambassador Bodde and Elizabeth Hawley in the background.

Mikel Dunham is an American author, artist, photojournalist. and Himalayan historian. In the 1980s, Dunham worked in New York City where he created three-dimensional constructions of wood, glass, mirror, photographs and acrylic media. The Alexander F. Milliken Gallery, Inc. represented his work. mounting numerous solo exhibitions in Soho, as well as group installations in the US and abroad.

The late 1980s Dunham became the last student of the late thangka master, Pema Wangyal of Dolpo. He spent the next four years learning how to mix mineral pigments, line-brush in 22-carat gold and paint Tibetan iconography. This led to Dunham's commission to paint the murals for a Tibetan monastery in Sarnath, India—one of eight major pilgrimage sites for Buddhists. Dunham then became artistic director for a much larger Tibetan mural project—a three-year commitment—in upstate New York at Pema Samye Ling Monastery.

In 2000, the Vajrakilaya Foundation selected Dunham to travel to Tibet and photograph Samye, Tibet's first monastery. Samye: A Pilgrimage to the Birthplace of Tibetan Buddhism (2004, Jodere Group), is the result of that assignment, a photography book interspersed with the history of Bon, the aboriginal religion of Tibet, and the three men most responsible for transforming Tibet into a tantric Buddhist nation: King Trisong Detsen, Padmasambhava and Shantarakshita. The foreword to Samye is written by the Dalai Lama.

== Publications ==
In addition to Samye, Dunham has written two murder mysteries: Stilled Life, in 1989 and Casting for Murder, in 1992.

In 2005, Dunham published Buddha's Warriors: The Story of the CIA-Backed Tibetan Freedom Fighters, the Chinese Invasion, and the Ultimate Fall of Tibet.

In 2008, Le goût du Tibet was published in France.

In 2012, Caught in Nepal: Tibetan Refugees Photographing Tibetan Refugees by Vajra Publications (Nepal).

in 2015, The Nepal Scene: Chronicles of Elizabeth Hawley, 1988-2007 was published.

Also in 2015, Dunham edited the English translation of The Autobiography of Rookmangud Katawal. He also wrote the Foreword.

Currently, Dunham is a correspondent for The Daily Beast.

Dunham has written articles for Harvard South Asian Journal, Tricycle Magazine, and a four-part report on child prostitute trafficking in Asia for Tehelka and interviewed by Radio Free Asia, Asia Times, Times of India, Indian Express, among many other magazines in Southeast Asia. Dunham plays an active role in human rights issues. He was selected as an international observer during the 2008 April elections in Nepal. Continual updates of the political situation in Nepal and Tibet are posted on his website.

== Television and film ==
Dunham co-stars in the History Channel's Tibetan Book Of The Dead (2007), Al Jazeera English Television's The Tibetan Refugee Crisis In Nepal (2008), the KefiWorks documentary The CIA In Tibet (theatrical release 2015), and The Dragon, a Spanish film on the Tibetan freedom fighters and the resultant refugee situation in Nepal, produced by Antropoduocus Produccions, Barcelona, Spain, and co-starring the Dalai Lama and Richard Gere. He is featured in Sophie Dia Pegrum's Talking to the Air: The Horse of the Last Forbidden Kingdom (2014), which had its debut at the Kathmandu International Mountain Film Festival (KIMFF).

== Bibliography ==
- Dunham, Mikel (1992), Casting for murder, St. Martin's Press, ISBN 978-0-312-06924-7
- Dunham, Mikel (2004), Samye: A Pilgrimage to the Birthplace of Tibetan Buddhism, Jodere Group, ISBN 978-1-58872-083-2
- Dunham, Mikel (2004), Buddha's warriors: the story of the CIA-backed Tibetan freedom fighters, the Chinese invasion, and the ultimate fall of Tibet, J.P. Tarcher, ISBN 978-1-58542-348-4
- Dunham, Mikel (2007), The Divine Art of Tibet: The Murals of Samye, Rizzoli International Publications, Inc, ISBN 978-0-7893-1483-3
- Dunham, Mikel (2008), "Le goût du Tibet", Mercure de France, ISBN 978-2-7152-2796-5
- Caught in Nepal: Tibetan Refugees Photographying Tibetan Refugees, Vajra Publications, 2012.
