= Dunham House =

Historic house in Indiana

Coordinates: 40.280547°N 86.231449°W

The Dunham House, located just south of Kempton, Indiana, USA, was built circa 1880s. The house was built by William Riley Dunham who served the U.S. Democratic Party for several years and represented Hamilton County and Tipton County in the Indiana General House of Assembly from 1913 to 1915. The home has made and is continuing to make history in this very small Indiana town, most recently with a visit from President Barack Obama and First Lady Michelle Obama.

== History ==
The land on which the Dunham House is built was originally a part of the Miami Indian Reserve in Indiana (Treaty of St. Mary's). In 1849, Jacob Dunham bought 120 acres (0.49 km^{2}) of land in what is now Jefferson Township from the State of Indiana. Dunham is buried in the Kempton Cemetery north of the town of Kempton. The land was passed on to his son, Jacob Mackey Dunham in 1856. Jacob Mackey eventually moved his family to Oklahoma, and the Dunham Family land was passed to Mackey's sister-in-law, Eliza (Reese) Dunham, in 1891. She was the wife of Mackey's brother, Samuel Dunham. She passed the land on to her son, William Riley Dunham, in 1900. The 5,000 sq ft (460 m^{2}) farm house that he built on the land is known today as The Dunham House. Local legends have been told that William Riley was an acquaintance of President Grover Cleveland and that the President had spent a night in the home. In fact, Riley's son was named Grover Cleveland Dunham and eventually inherited the home from his father. On the death of Dr. Grover Cleveland's wife, Hazel Dunham, the house was sold to buyers outside the Dunham family. The home fell into many years of neglect and abuse after it left the Dunham family. The home was purchased and is now owned by Shawn Christopher Clements and is in the process of being restored.

The Dunham family played a significant role in the local community. They were farmers, doctors and teachers working within the town limits of Kempton and throughout Tipton and Clinton Counties. Many of their descendants still live in the area today.

== From the Dunham House to the White House ==
In researching the Dunham family that built his home, Clements found a direct connection to President Barack Obama. Jacob Dunham came to Tipton County in the 1840s. He is Obama's fourth great-grandfather. He purchased the land from the United States Government in 1849 when President Zachary Taylor was in office. This land was originally obtained by the government through treaties with the Miami Indians. Jacob Dunham's son, Jacob Mackey Dunham, is Obama's third great-grandfather. He married Lousie Eliza Stroup in Tipton County, Indiana on July 21, 1853, and inherited the land in 1856. Their son, Jacob William Dunham, born on February 7, 1863, in Kempton, was Obama's second great-grandfather. He later left Indiana for Kansas with his wife Mary Ann Kearney, and died on August 13, 1930. Thus President Obama's family continued in Kansas to his mother as the land stayed in the Dunham family for over 120 years.

On May 3, 2008, then-Senator Obama and his family made a stop at the Dunham House during their presidential nomination campaign against Hillary Clinton. Obama wanted to learn more about his ancestors who lived in Kempton because he was influenced mostly by his mother, Ann Dunham, and his grandparents, Stanley Armour Dunham and Madelyn Payne Dunham.

== Today ==
Today, the home is privately owned by Shawn Christopher Clements and is being restored to its original beauty. It is open for tours and meetings by reservation. Clements also does many speaking engagements in the surrounding communities at libraries and group gatherings. The hope for this historical home is that it can continue to give back to the community of Kempton and the state of Indiana as it has for so many years before.
