= Dinham =

Dinham may refer to:

== Places ==
=== England ===
- a historic settlement that forms part of the town of Ludlow, Shropshire
- Buckland Dinham, a village in Somerset

=== Wales ===
- a village in Monmouthshire that was consumed by the Royal Navy Propellant Factory, Caerwent

== People ==
- Ann Dinham (1827–1882), British convict sent to Tasmania
- Charles Hawker Dinham (1883–1955), British geologist, cartographer and author
- John Dinham (1359–1428), English knight
- John Dinham (1406–1458), English knight
- Matthew Dinham (born 2000), Australian cyclist
- Thomas Dinham Atkinson (1864–1948), English architect
