= Jonathan Singletary Dunham =

American settler (1640–1724)

Jonathan Dunham
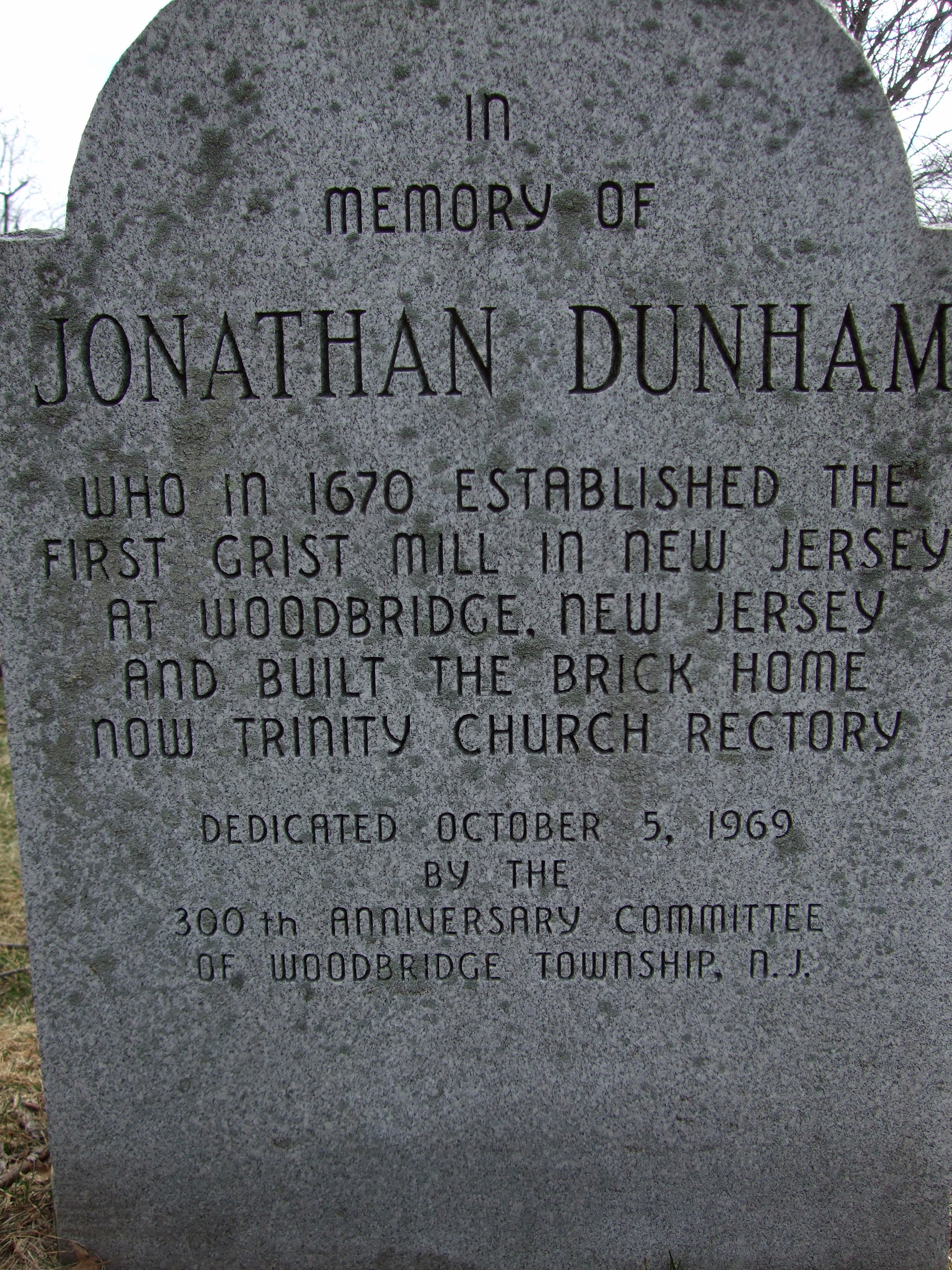
- Memorial at Trinity Episcopal Church in Woodbridge Township, New Jersey
- Born: Jonathan Singletary; January 17, 1640; Newbury, Massachusetts Bay Colony
- Died: September 6, 1724 (aged 84); Woodbridge Township, Province of New Jersey
- Spouse: Mary Bloomfield

Jonathan Dunham (né Singletary, born January 17, 1640 – September 6, 1724), commonly known as Jonathan Singletary Dunham, was a prominent early European-American settler of Woodbridge Township, New Jersey, who built the first gristmill in New Jersey. He is the 8th great-grandfather of President Barack Obama through the direct paternal line of his mother Ann Dunham.

== Life ==
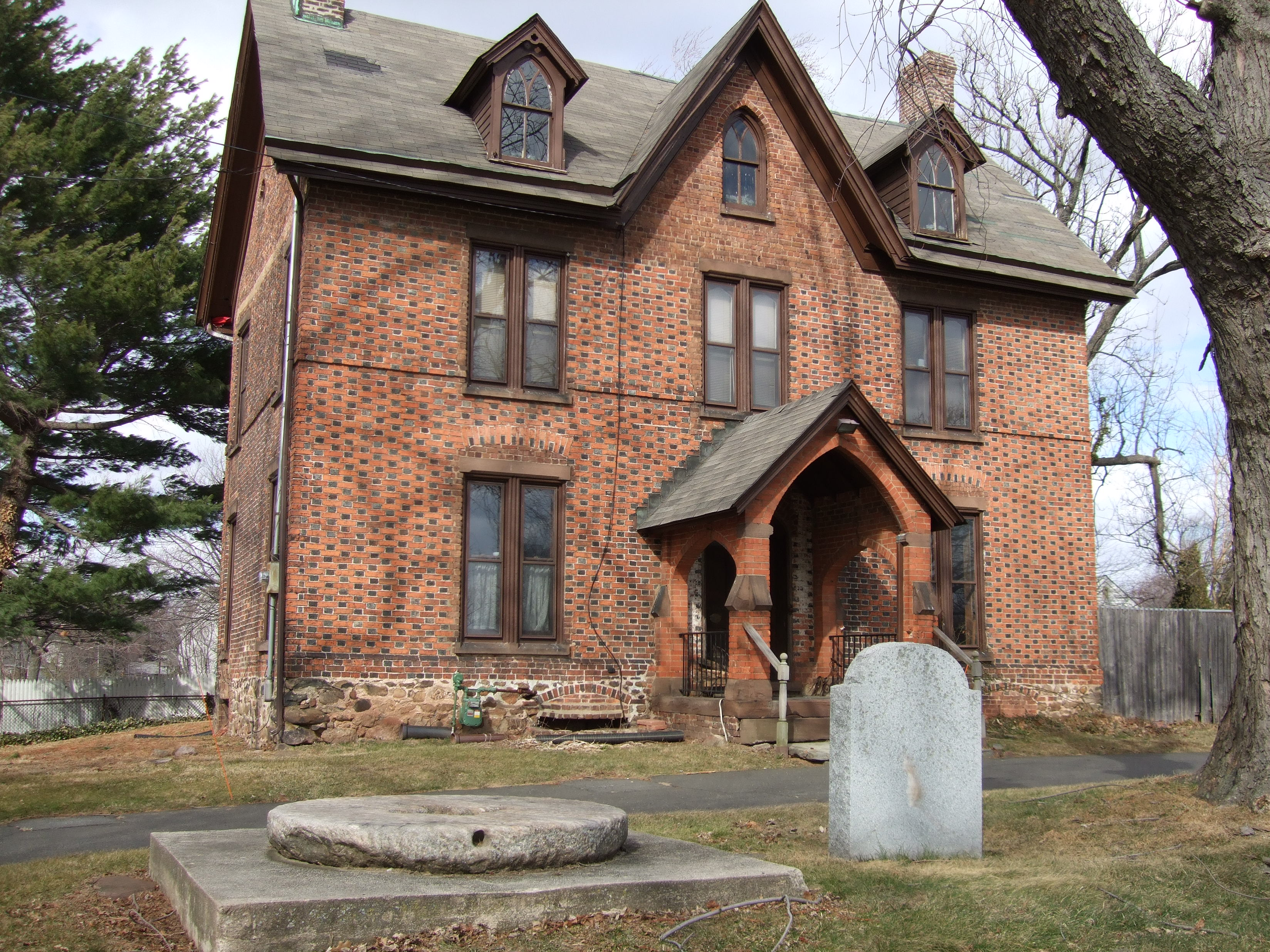
Jonathan Singletary Dunham House in Woodbridge, New Jersey. Original millstone used by Dunham and memorial plaques appear in foreground.

Dunham was born Jonathan Singletary on January 17, 1639/40, in Salisbury, Massachusetts, the son of Richard Singletary and Susanna Cooke. He married Mary Bloomfield (a relative of the later New Jersey Governor Joseph Bloomfield, for whom the township of Bloomfield, New Jersey is named).

He and his wife migrated to Woodbridge Township, New Jersey, the first Township of New Jersey, which was chartered by King Charles II on June 1, 1669. Possibly due to an unsubstantiated family legend about his father being the heir of the family of Dunham, or because Jonathan himself was the son of an earlier marriage of Richard Singletary to a Dunham wife who had died in 1638/39, Jonathan Singletary called himself Dunham after moving to New Jersey. While all of the other sons of Richard Singletary used the Singletary surname, Jonathan adopted the name of Dunham, and all of his children retained it. This is somewhat substantiated with new DNA evidence documenting the surname crossover.

At Woodbridge, Dunham was granted 213 acres (0.86 km^{2}) of land by the newly appointed Governor of New Jersey. Upon this land, he built the first gristmill in New Jersey. He later received a further grant of 203 acres (0.82 km^{2}) and also acquired many other tracts of land in New Jersey and Massachusetts. After finding success with his gristmill, Dunham went into public life, serving as the Clerk of the Woodbridge Township Court and overseer of highways, and in 1673 he was elected to the New Jersey Provincial Congress.

== Death and legacy ==
Dunham died in Woodbridge, New Jersey in 1724. The house the Dunhams built in 1671, the Jonathan Singletary Dunham House, still stands and currently serves as the Rectory of the Trinity Episcopal Church.

In the words of Woodridge historian Rev. Joseph W. Dally, "Dunham was a man of great energy. When he determined upon an enterprise he pushed it forward to success with indomitable perseverance. So many of his relatives settled in the north of the Kirk Green that the neighborhood was known as Dunhamtown for many years."

In addition to one of the original millstones used by Dunham, two memorial plaques have been placed in front of the Trinity Church Rectory. The first plaque reads, "This millstone from the mill of Jonathan Dunham builder of Trinity Church Rectory 1670 was placed here by Trinity Young Peoples Fellowship on the 250th Anniversary of Trinity Church May 16, 1948." The second memorial plaque reads, "In Memory of Jonathan Dunham who in 1670 established the First Grist Mill in New Jersey at Woodbridge, New Jersey and built the Brick House now Trinity Church Rector dedicated October 5, 1969 by the 300th Anniversary Comm. of Woodbridge Township NJ."

== Notable descendants ==
- Stanley Armour Dunham (1918–1992), maternal grandfather of Barack Obama
- Ann Dunham (1942–1995), American anthropologist and mother of Barack Obama
- Barack Obama (1961–), 44th President of the United States
- Joseph Bloomfield (1753–1823), 4th Governor of New Jersey
