= Dunham's Mill =

Historic building in Clinton, New Jersey

- U.S. National Register of Historic Places
- U.S. Historic district – Contributing property
- New Jersey Register of Historic Places
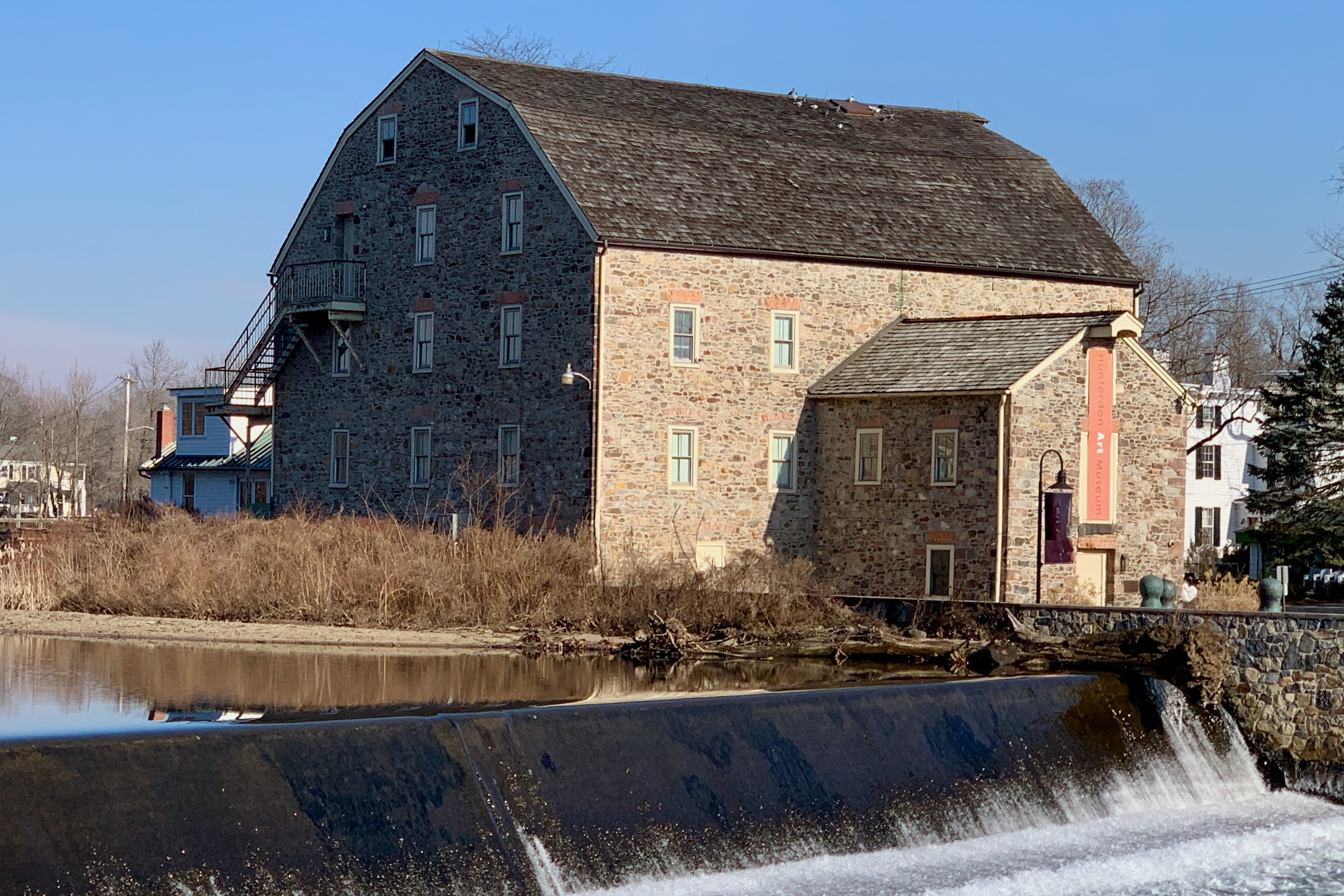
- Dunham's Mill and Clinton Dam

- Location within Hunterdon County, New Jersey Location within New Jersey Location within the United States
- Location: 7 Lower Center Street, Clinton, New Jersey
- Coordinates: 40°38′11″N 74°54′43″W
- Area: 0.8 acres (0.32 ha)
- Built: 1837
- Part of: Clinton Historic District (ID95001101)
- NRHP reference No.: 82003277
- NJRHP No.: 1568

Significant dates
- Added to NRHP: April 15, 1982
- Designated CP: September 28, 1995
- Designated NJRHP: November 12, 1981

Dunham's Mill, also known as Parry's Mill, is a historic building located at 7 Lower Center Street in Clinton, New Jersey, United States. The gristmill was in operation from 1837 to 1952. It was added to the National Register of Historic Places on April 15, 1982, for its significance in commerce and industry. In 1995, it was also listed as a contributing property of the Clinton Historic District. It shares the Clinton Dam across the South Branch Raritan River with the David McKinney Mill (now known as the Red Mill) on the other side of the river. Since 1952, it has been home to the Hunterdon Art Museum, described by an art critic as the "most charming and picturesque" museum in the state.

== History ==
Daniel Hunt owned the land and a previous mill at this site during the American Revolution. After his death, his son Ralph owned the property. In 1828, Archibald Taylor bought the property and had J. W. Bray and his son John B. manage it. In 1834, the mill was sold to George W. Taylor and James R. Dunham. In 1836, the previous mill burned and the current mill was constructed by Charles and James R. Dunham. Operations started in 1837. Samuel Parry purchased the mill in 1843. The mill was used to grind wheat, rye, corn, and oats for flour and animal feed. By 1870, a small gypsum, or plaster, mill operation was added. After Parry's death in 1907, the mill was sold to Issac Krall, who operated it at full capacity during World War I. After Krall's death in 1929, the mill was sold to Joseph Kreidel, who would be the last operator. The mill remained in operation until 1952, when it was sold to become the home of the Hunterdon Art Museum.

== Description ==
The mill is a 3 1/2-story stone building with a gambrel roof. The stone walls are between 18.5 and 23.75 inches (47.0 and 60.3 cm) thick. The original raceway went under a large brick archway on the west side of the building and exited to the south below the Clinton Dam. The main mill entrance and loading bays are located on the east side. A two-story stone plaster-mill building, built c. 1865, is attached to the south side of the main mill building.

== Gallery ==
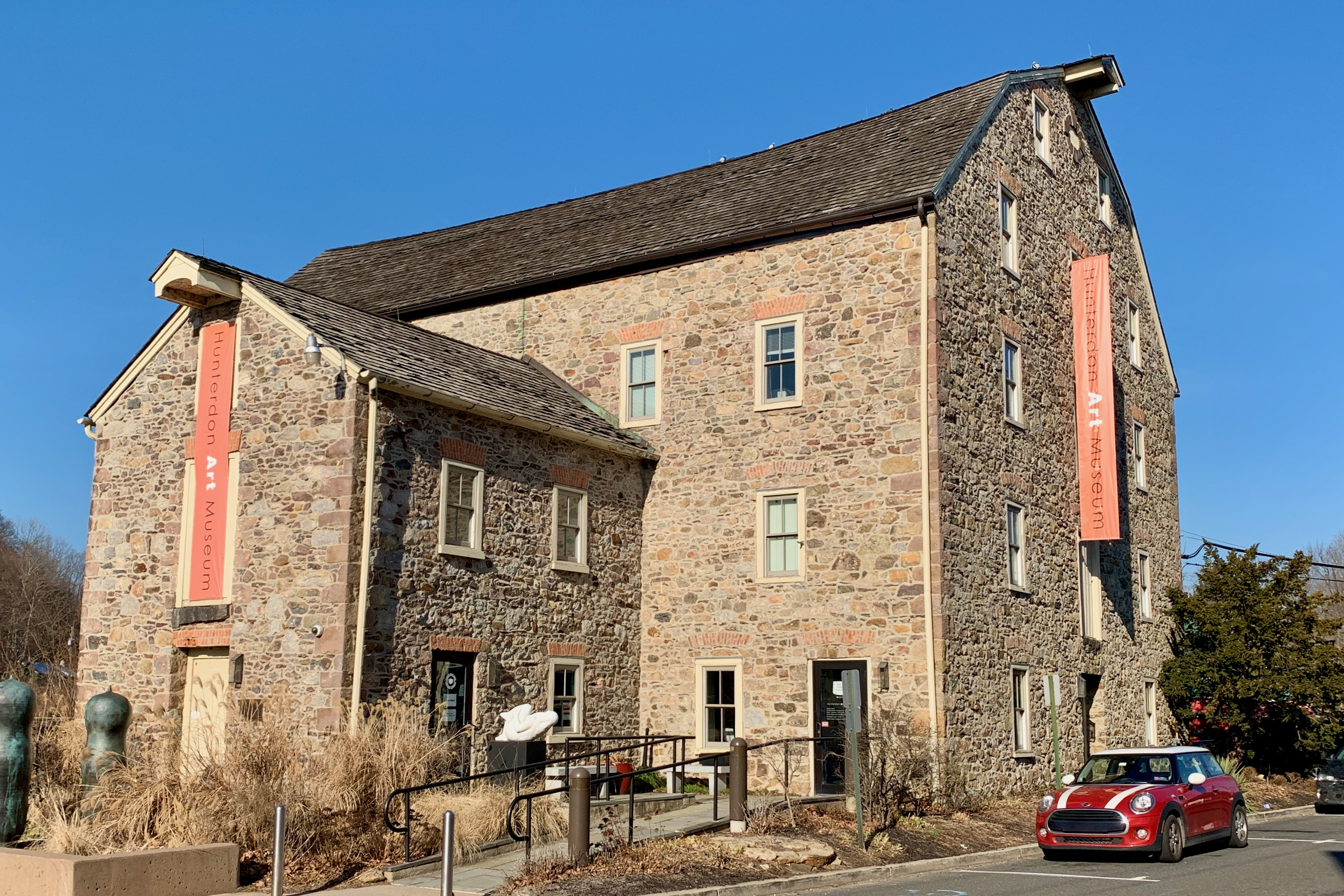
Gristmill, with plaster mill on the left, both with Hunterdon Art Museum banners
