= Denham (surname) =

Denham is a surname of Old English origin. It originally referred to those from Denham, Buckinghamshire, Denham, Suffolk and Denholme, Yorkshire. The name of Denham may have come from Brittany as "de Dinan" (Dinan is a walled town in North West France) and carried to Scotland by Alan, Baron de Dinan. (Probably with the William the Conquer). See The name "Denham" by Virginia Denham (Detroit 1940).

== Notable persons with this name ==
- Anthony Denham (born 1991), American football player
- Daryl Denham, British radio DJ
- Digby Denham (1859–1944), Australian politician
- Dixon Denham, British explorer
- Henry Denham, British printer
- Henry Mangles Denham, (1800–1887), British naval officer and surveyor
- Sir James Steuart Denham (1744−1839), Scottish soldier
- Jeff Denham (born 1967), American politician
- John Denham (1615–1669), English poet
- John Denham (born 1953), British politician
- Maurice Denham (1909−2002), British actor
- Robert Denham (1885–1954), American lawyer
- Sean Denham (born 1969), Australian rules footballer
- Susan Denham (born 1945), Irish judge
- Thomas Denham, American merchant

== See also ==
- Baron Denham
- Carl Denham, fictional character from King Kong
