= William Riley Dunham =

American politician

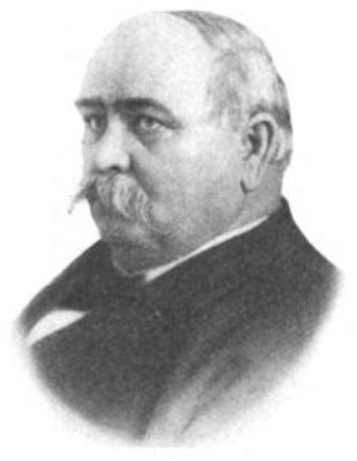

Member of the Indiana House of Representatives
- In office 1912–1914

Personal details
- Born: February 1, 1856
- Died: February 4, 1921 (aged 65)
- Party: Democratic
- Education: Valparaiso Normal School
- Occupation: Farmer, politician

William Riley Dunham (February 1, 1856 – February 4, 1921), "the man known by name by more men, women and children than any other one man in Tipton County," according to a 1912 issue of the Kempton Courier, was a member of the Indiana General Assembly, representing Hamilton and Tipton counties from 1913 to 1915.

== Biography ==
William Riley Dunham was born on February 1, 1856, was born to Samuel Goodnight Dunham and Eliza Matilda Reese. He attended Valparaiso Normal School, then worked as a farmer and stockraiser in Kempton. There he also served as Township Assessor, Township Trustee, and Deputy County Treasurer.

He was elected to the Indiana House of Representatives as a Democrat in 1912, and served one term.

He died of "traveling sickness" on February 4, 1921.

== Legacy ==
The 5,000 sq ft (460 m^{2}) farm house that Dunham built in Tipton County, Indiana in the 1880s, The Dunham House, still stands today. The original 120 acres (0.49 km^{2}) of land upon which the house was built was purchased by his grandfather, Jacob Dunham, as a land grant in 1849 and remained in the Dunham family until 1969. As local legend recalls, William Riley was an acquaintance of President Grover Cleveland, who may have spent the night in the home. He even named one of his sons Grover Cleveland Dunham, eventually a physician, who would later inherent the property from his father. The Dunham file that the Heritage Society maintains mysteriously contains an obscure newspaper article giving details of a secret medical procedure that President Cleveland underwent while in office. The Dunham family, and the Goodnight, Kearney, and Stroup families that they married into, served the public in the region in politics, medicine, education, and agriculture.

Then candidate Barack Obama, a descendant of Dunham's brother, visited the house with his wife and daughters in May 2008. A historical marker now graces the property.
