= Belleville Turnpike Bridge =

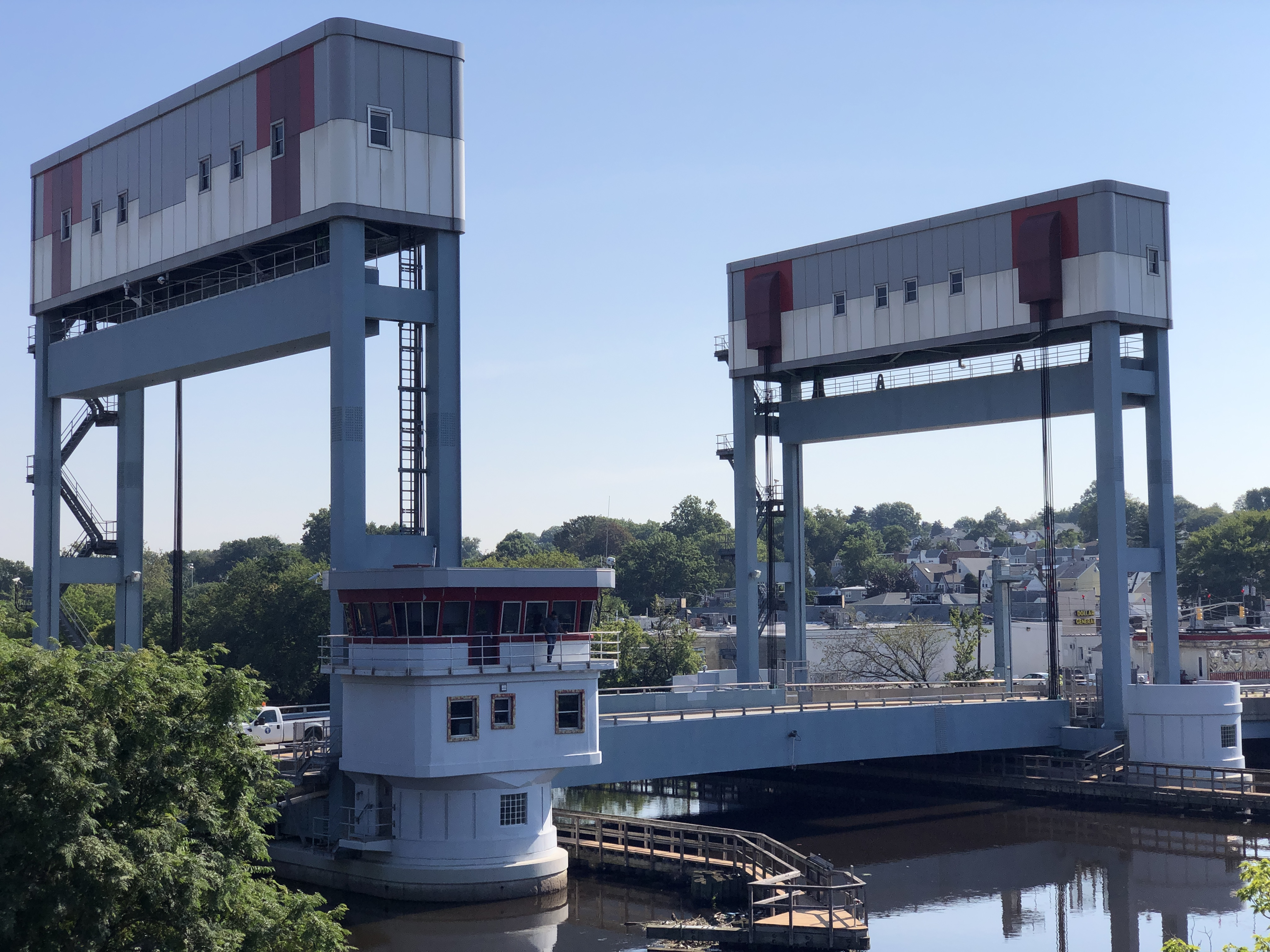
- 2021
- Coordinates: 40°47′11″N 74°08′51″W
- Carries: Route 7
- Crosses: Passaic River
- Locale: Belleville; Kearny; North Arlington in New Jersey
- Other name(s): Rutgers Street Bridge; New Jersey Route 7 Bridge; Lance Corporal Osbrany Montes de Oca Memorial Bridge
- Owner: NJDOT
- ID number: 0208150
- Preceded by: bridges built in 1790, 1841, 1915

Characteristics
- Design: Lift
- Material: Structural steel & reinforced concrete
- Total length: 324.2 feet (98.8 m)
- Width: 67.6 feet (20.6 m)
- Longest span: 125 feet (38 m)
- No. of spans: 5
- Clearance above: 16.1 feet (4.9 m)
- Clearance below: 49.9 feet (15.2 m) (open)

History
- Construction start: 2002
- Opened: 2002

Location
- Interactive map of Belleville Turnpike Bridge

The Belleville Turnpike Bridge is a vehicular moveable bridge spanning the Passaic River in northeastern New Jersey 8.9 miles (14.3 km) from its river mouth at Newark Bay. Also known as Rutgers Street Bridge and Route 7 Bridge, it is the fourth fixed crossing to be built at the location, today the tripoint of the municipal and county lines of Belleville in Essex, Kearny in Hudson, and North Arlington in Bergen. Commissioned by the New Jersey Department of Transportation, which owns and operates it, the vertical lift bridge opened in 2002.

== Operations ==
The lower 17 miles (27 km) of the 90-mile-long (140 km) Passaic River downstream of the Dundee Dam is tidally influenced and channelized. Once one of the most heavily used waterways in the Port of New York and New Jersey, it remains partially navigable for commercial marine traffic. While requests have significantly diminished since the mid-late 20th century, the bridge at MP 11.7 and those downstream from it are required by federal regulations to open. Both bridges along New Jersey Route 7 are operated by the NJDOT. The crossing of the Hackensack River, the Wittpenn Bridge, is staffed and opens on demand. The Rutgers Street Bridge requires four hours' notice for opening.

== History ==
The valley of the Passaic River in the vicinity of the bridge was first settled by Europeans in the late 17th century. Schuyler Copper Mine, founded in 1715, was one of the earliest in the United States. Of the homesteads that lined the banks, several remain, including (from south to north) the Sydenham House, the Van Riper House, Kingsland Manor, Vreeland Homestead, Jacob W. Van Winkle House, and Yereance-Berry House. Belleville was founded near the point where the Second River empties in the Passaic, the river crossing is in the immediate vicinity of the Reformed Dutch Church of Second River. A bridge crossing the Passaic was built some time earlier at Acquackanonk about 4 miles to the north.

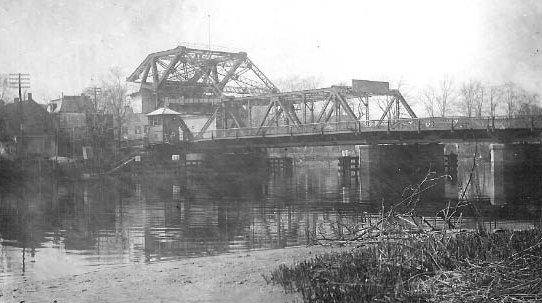
Bascule bridge 1915–2000

The Belleville Turnpike was created in 1759 as a colonial turnpike originally laid with cedar logs to cross what was then known as New Barbadoes Neck and today as the Kearny Meadows. The first bridge across the Passaic River at Rutgers Street was chartered in 1790 by Anthony Rutgers. The wooden structure burned down in 1841, and was immediately replaced by the second, known as the White Bridge. That structure was replaced in 1914 by a bascule bridge.

== Dedication ==
As of July 4, 2013, the bridge was formally designated the Lance Corporal Osbrany Montes de Oca Memorial Bridge to honor a North Arlington resident, a 20-year-old U.S. Marine fatally wounded February 10, 2012, while serving in Afghanistan.

== See also ==
- List of bridges documented by the Historic American Engineering Record in New Jersey
- List of bridges, tunnels, and cuts in Hudson County, New Jersey
- List of crossings of the Lower Passaic River
- List of turnpikes in New Jersey
