= Andrew Pecora =

Andrew Pecora M.D., FACP, CPE
- Born: Andrew Louis Pecora; 1957 (age 68–69); Newark, New Jersey
- Education: Seton Hall University (BS); Univ. of Medicine & Dentistry–NJ; The New York Hospital (internship and residency); Memorial Sloan Kettering Cancer Center (fellowship)
- Occupations: Chairman, professor
- Medical career
- Profession: Physician, hospital administrator
- Field: Hematology, oncology
- Institutions: Cota Healthcare; Hackensack Medical Center; Memorial Sloan Kettering; New York Hospital-Cornell Medical Center; Univ. of Medicine & Dentistry–NJ; John Theurer Cancer Center

Andrew Louis Pecora (born 1957) is an American hematologist and oncologist involved in research on the use of stem cells and oncolytic viruses to treat diseases, including cancer. He is the CEO of Outcomes Matter Innovations. As of 2020, he is on the Board of Directors Celularity, Inc. (since 2017) and founder and Executive Chairman, COTA, Inc. (since 2012). Previously, he was chief innovations officer, professor and vice president of cancer services at the John Theurer Cancer Center, part of the Hackensack University Medical Center. He is a professor of medicine and oncology at Georgetown University.

== Early life and education ==
Pecora was born in 1957 in Newark, New Jersey. He was raised in Nutley and graduated Nutley High School. Pecora attended Seton Hall University, graduating in 1979 with Bachelor of Science in Biology. He then attended the University of Medicine and Dentistry of New Jersey (UMDNJ), graduating with a medical degree in 1983. He is a diplomate of the American Board of Internal Medicine's sub-specialties of hematology and oncology.

== Medical career ==
Pecora interned at New York Hospital-Cornell Medical Center from 1983 to 1984 and was a resident in internal medicine from 1984 to 1986.

From 1986 to 1989, he began a fellowship at Memorial Sloan Kettering Cancer Center. He then moved to Hackensack University Medical Center (HUMC) to become assistant director of stem cell and bone marrow transplantation from 1990 to 1993. He became the program's chief director of stem cell collection and storage services. Pecora later created the John Theurer Cancer Center's and served as chairman, chief innovations officer, and vice president.

He is listed as an inventor on seven granted patents. His distinctions include he ASCO Cancer Foundation Research Award, BioNJ Dr. Sol J. Barer Award for vision, innovation and leadership, and the Gallo Award for outstanding cancer research.

=== Research and grants ===
Between 1992 and 2005, Pecora was Principal Investigator on more than 40 studies and trials. In 1998, he started a version of the problem-based learning program at UMDNJ. This was an adaptation of earlier programs that allows medical students to fulfill their early basic science course requirements by examining the actual case studies.

That same year, Pecora was the lead author on the study of CD34^{+}CD33^{−} cells as it relates to chemotherapy treatment and bone marrow transplantation for the treatment of non-Hodgkin's lymphoma (NHL). Pecora et al. discovered that patients who had received more than two cycles of chemotherapy and were shown to have "chemotherapy-resistant NHL mobilized a significantly lower percentage of CD34^{+}CD33^{−} cells than did chemotherapy-sensitive NHL patients." They also found the reverse that those who had received less significant levels of chemotherapy treatment had higher levels of CD34^{+}CD33^{−} cells.

In 2002, Pecora was an investigator in a study of PV701, a virus that selectively attacks cancer cells. In the phase 1 clinical trial, they found that intravenous administration of the oncolytic viruses led to inflammation of the tumor site that made it difficult to immediately determine effectiveness of the treatment. This false appearance of increase in cancer cells was confirmed by a later trial of the same oncolytic virus, and also in Onyx 015, an oncolytic adenovirus. In describing the report authored by Pecora, Emily Bergsland and Alan Venook editorialized that

This report of 79 patients is lengthy and complicated, but by necessity rather than by choice. Whether or not this agent proves effective against cancer, this phase I trial merits careful study, because viral therapies for cancer are emerging, and their optimal development is a major challenge.

The study concludes that PV701 could be tested relatively safely and offers dosing guidelines to mitigate side effects. However, the study raised more questions, moving "the field forward, even if very slowly."

In 1995, HUMC participated in a clinical study sponsored by National Cancer Institute that focused on the use of bone marrow transplantation to treat women with advanced breast cancer. Pecora expressed his misgivings about only offering the procedure as part of the study, as there was a chance the patients would be chosen aspart of the control group. He instead offered direct access to the popular new procedure as an alternative to participation in the trial, allowing the patients to choose. The procedure was later proven ineffective.

In 1998, Pecora started a version of the problem-based learning program at UMDNJ. This was an adaptation of earlier programs that allows medical students to fulfill their early basic science course requirements by examining the actual case studies.

In 2009, The Record named Pecora among Hackensack's administration members with conflicts of interest, as they had ownership interests in companies with business dealings with the hospital.

In 2011, Pecora founded Cota Healthcare, a company to develop a classification system based on patient's "gender, age, family history, type and stage of disease, and treatments."

== Notable publications ==
As of July 2021, Research Gate lists 136 peer-reviewed articles and 3,070 citations.

- Pecora, Andrew; et al. (1998). "CD34+CD33- cells influence days to engraftment and transfusion requirements in autologous blood stem-cell recipients". Journal of Clinical Oncology. 16 (6): 2093–2104. doi:10.1200/jco.1998.16.6.2093. PMID 9626209.
- Pecora, Andrew; et al. (April 1, 2000). "Prompt and durable engraftment in two older adult patients with high risk chronic myelogenous leukemia (CML) using ex vivo expanded and unmanipulated unrelated umbilical cord blood". Bone Marrow Transplantation. 25 (7): 797–799. doi:10.1038/sj.bmt.1702222. PMID 10745268.
- Goldberg, Stuart; Pecora, Andrew; et al. (February 1, 2002). "Unusual viral infections (progressive multifocal leukoencephalopathy and cytomegalovirus disease) after high-dose chemotherapy with autologous blood stem cell rescue and peritransplantation rituximab". Blood. 99 (4): 1486–1488. doi:10.1182/blood.V99.4.1486. PMID 11830505. S2CID 7028301.
- Pecora, Andrew; et al. (May 1, 2002). "Phase I Trial of Intravenous Administration of PV701, an Oncolytic Virus, in Patients With Advanced Solid Cancers". Journal of Clinical Oncology. 20 (9): 2251–2266. doi:10.1200/jco.2002.08.042. PMID 11980996.
- van Besien, Koen; Pecora, Andrew; et al. (November 15, 2003). "Comparison of autologous and allogeneic hematopoietic stem cell transplantation for follicular lymphoma". Blood. 102 (10): 3521–3529. doi:10.1182/blood-2003-04-1205. PMID 12893748. S2CID 9234114.
- Lorence, Robert; Pecora, Andrew; et al. (December 1, 2003). "Overview of phase I studies of intravenous administration of PV701, an oncolytic virus". Current Opinion in Molecular Therapeutics. 5 (6): 618–624. PMID 14755888.

== Sources ==
- Siena, Salvatore; et al. (March 2000). "Therapeutic Relevance of CD34 Cell Dose in Blood Cell Transplantation for Cancer Therapy". Journal of Clinical Oncology. 18 (6): 1360–1377. doi:10.1200/jco.2000.18.6.1360. PMID 10715309.
- Bell, John; et al. (July 2003). "Getting oncolytic virus therapies off the ground". Cancer Cell. 4 (1): 7–11. doi:10.1016/s1535-6108(03)00170-3. PMID 12892708.
- Bergsland, Emily; Venook, Alan (May 2002). "Shedding Old Paradigms: Developing Viruses to Treat Cancer". Journal of Clinical Oncology. 20 (9): 2220–2222. doi:10.1200/jco.2002.20.9.2220. PMID 11980991.
- Aghi, Manish; Martuza, Robert (November 21, 2005). "Oncolytic viral therapies – the clinical experience". Oncogene. 24 (52): 7802–7816. doi:10.1038/sj.onc.1209037. PMID 16299539.
- Ahmad, Zeeshan; Kratzke, Robert (December 21, 2016). "Novel oncolytic viral therapies in patients with thoracic malignancies". Oncolytic Virotherapy. 6: 1–9. doi:10.2147/ov.s116012. PMC 5189707. PMID 28053943.
