= Frank Fowler (artist) =

American painter (1852–1910)

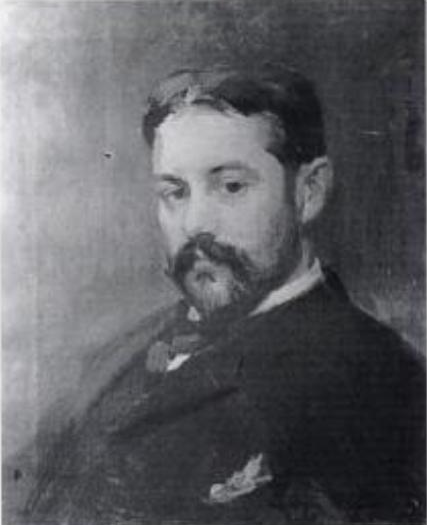
- Born: July 12, 1852; Brooklyn, New York City, YS
- Died: August 18, 1910 (aged 58); New Canaan, Connecticut, US
- Education: Adelphi Academy
- Occupation: Painter

Frank Fowler (July 12, 1852 – August 18, 1910) was an American figure and portrait painter.

== Biography ==
Fowler was born on July 12, 1852, in Brooklyn. He was educated at Adelphi Academy.

Fowler studied painting in Europe, at Florence, Italy for two years under Edwin White, for seven years under Carolus-Duran in Paris, and under Alexandre Cabanel at the École des Beaux-Arts.

Fowler assisted Duran on the fresco of Marie de Médicis in the Luxembourg Palace. On his return to New York in 1879 he devoted himself for a time to mural painting, his most important work being the decoration of the ballroom at the Waldorf Hotel (1892) (The building exists no more, having been destroyed to provide a place where the Empire State Building could be erected). Later he painted chiefly portraits, including a number of public men. Some of his portraits have been kept at Albany, New York and elsewhere.

In the late 1890s, Fowler resided in a home on at #16 The Enclosure, an artists' colony in Nutley, New Jersey. He built a large studio on the back of that house, where he painted. The same studio was later owned by Michael Lenson, a well known New Jersey painter who was director of the mural division of the New Jersey WPA in the 1930s. Earlier, the same home was owned by Frederick Dana Marsh, the illustrator. The house was the childhood home of Reginald Marsh, the distinguished American painter. In 1892, he was elected into the National Academy of Design as an Associate member, and became a full Academician in 1900.

Fowler wrote upon art topics for the magazines and several textbooks: Oil Painting (1885), Portrait and Figure Painting (1901) and Drawing In Charcoal And Crayon (1899).

Fowler died in New Canaan, Connecticut on August 18, 1910, aged 58.
