= Pojani =

Poiani or Pojani may refer to:

- Poggiodomo, an Italian comune whose people are called Poiani or Pojani
- Pojan, a town in southeastern Albania whose football club is KF Pojani
- Pojan, Fier, a town in southwestern Albania
- Eileen Poiani, American mathematician
- Orhan Pojani (1846–1913), Albanian nationalist and magazine publisher
