= Nutley High School =

High school in Essex County, New Jersey, US

Location
- 300 Franklin Avenue; Nutley, Essex County, New Jersey 07110; United States; 40.81750°N 74.16011°W

Information
- Type: Public high school
- Established: 1889
- School district: Nutley Public Schools
- NCES School ID: 341188002378
- Principal: Denis Williams
- Faculty: 88.1 FTEs
- Grades: 9-12
- Enrollment: 1,222 (as of 2024–25)
- Student to teacher ratio: 13.9:1
- Campus: Urban
- Colors: Maroon and gray
- Athletics conference: Super Essex Conference (general); North Jersey Super Football Conference (football)
- Team name: Raiders
- Accreditation: Middle States Association of Colleges and Schools
- Publication: The Maroon and Gray
- Website: www.nutleyschools.org/schools/nhs

Nutley High School is a four-year comprehensive public high school in the Township of Nutley, in Essex County, in the U.S. state of New Jersey, serving students in ninth through twelfth grades as the lone secondary school of the Nutley Public Schools. The school's colors are maroon and gray. The school has been accredited by the Middle States Association of Colleges and Schools Commission on Elementary and Secondary Schools since 1928. Students pursue an appropriate academic program to prepare for post-secondary education or for employment.

As of the 2024–25 school year, the school had an enrollment of 1,222 students and 88.1 classroom teachers (on an FTE basis), for a student–teacher ratio of 13.9:1. There were 171 students (14.0% of enrollment) eligible for free lunch and 17 (1.4% of students) eligible for reduced-cost lunch.

== Awards, recognition and rankings ==
The school was the 130th-ranked public high school in New Jersey out of 339 schools statewide in New Jersey Monthly magazine's September 2014 cover story on the state's "Top Public High Schools", using a new ranking methodology. The school had been ranked 140th in the state of 328 schools in 2012, after being ranked 160th in 2010 out of 322 schools listed. The magazine ranked the school 141st in 2008 out of 316 schools. The school was ranked 129th in the magazine's September 2006 issue, which surveyed 316 schools across the state.

== Graduation requirements ==
Students must pass the New Jersey High School Proficiency Assessment (HSPA) and earn a minimum of 120 credits in English, mathematics, science, social studies, world languages, physical/health education, visual/performing/practical arts, computer applications, and electives.

== Athletics ==
The Nutley High School Raiders compete in the Super Essex Conference, which is comprised of public and private high schools in Essex County and was established following a reorganization of sports leagues in Northern New Jersey by the New Jersey State Interscholastic Athletic Association (NJSIAA). Before the NJSIAA's 2009 realignment, the school had participated in the Northern New Jersey Interscholastic League, which included schools in Bergen, Essex and Passaic counties. With 910 students in grades 10-12, the school was classified by the NJSIAA for the 2019–20 school year as Group III for most athletic competition purposes, which included schools with an enrollment of 761 to 1,058 students in that grade range. The football team competes in the Freedom White division of the North Jersey Super Football Conference, which includes 112 schools competing in 20 divisions, making it the nation's biggest football-only high school sports league. The school was classified by the NJSIAA as Group IV North for football for 2024–2026, which included schools with 893 to 1,315 students.

School colors are maroon and gray. Interscholastic sports offered include crew (men and women), golf (men and women), track and field spring (men and women), soccer (men and women), cross country (men and women), bowling (men and women), softball (women), basketball (men and women), tennis (men and women), football (men), track and field winter (men and women), wrestling (men), baseball (men), volleyball (women), ice hockey (men), cross country (women) crew (men) and lacrosse (men).

The school participates as the host school / lead agency for a joint ice hockey team with Bloomfield High School and Columbia High School. The co-op program operates under agreements scheduled to expire in June 2028.

The 1977 girls' basketball team finished the season with a 28–1 record after winning the Group III state championship, defeating Willingboro High School by a score of 48–45 in the tournament final.

The 1992 football team finished the season with an 8-1-2 record after winning the North II, Group III state sectional title with a 39–6 victory against Morris Knolls High School in the championships game.

The softball team won the Group III state title in 1992 vs. Ocean Township High School and 1995 vs. Watchung Hills Regional High School. The 1992 team finished the season with a 20–7 record after winning the Group III title with a 6–4 victory against Ocean Township in the championship game.

The baseball team won the 2001 North II, Group III sectionals, defeating Cranford High School by a score of 5–3 in the final. The 2004 team won the North I, Group III title, edging Paramus High School 4-3. The team won the Greater Newark Tournament in 1993, 2001, 2002 and 2004. The program's four titles are tied for fifth-most in tournament history through 2019. The team won the 2004 Greater Newark Tournament title, defeating Seton Hall Preparatory School 3-2 in the finals.

The co-op ice hockey team with Columbia High School won the McMullen Cup and the Monsignor Kelly Cup in 2019. The 2019 team won the McMullen Cup with a 4–2 win in the tournament final against the Frisch School.

== Administration ==
The school's principal is Denis Williams. His administration team includes two vice principals.

== Notable appearances ==
Aerosmith lead singer Steven Tyler performed on stage at the Nutley prom in June 1966 as part of a predecessor group called "The Strangeurs".

In 2004, Nutley High School's football team and other student organizations were featured on MTV's Total Request Live, when high school student Corey Smith directed the short three-minute film Making the Grade, starring Hugh Jackman as a high school math teacher.

== Notable alumni ==
- Anthony Bowens (born 1990), professional wrestler signed to All Elite Wrestling
- Alan Branigan (born 1975, class of 1993), Ivorian-born professional soccer player
- Barbara Buono (born 1953, class of 1971), New Jersey State Senator who represented the 18th Legislative District from 2002 to 2014
- Jane Burgio (1922–2005, class of 1940), politician who served as Secretary of State of New Jersey and as a member of the New Jersey General Assembly
- Don Chuy (1941–2014), professional American football player who played guard for seven seasons for the Los Angeles Rams and the Philadelphia Eagles
- Clams Casino (born 1987 as Mike Volpe), hip hop producer
- Rena DeAngelo (class of 1984), Emmy Award winning and Academy Award nominated set decorator for her work on the films Bridge of Spies and West Side Story
- David DiFrancesco (class of 1967), photoscientist, inventor, cinematographer, and photographer
- Ken Eulo (born 1939, class of 1957), Eugene O'Neill Award-winning writer and bestselling author whose novels have collectively sold over 13 million copies worldwide
- Ron Fraser (1933–2013, class of 1952), "Wizard of College Baseball", Baseball coach at University of Miami
- Garry Furnari (born 1954, class of 1972), Nutley mayor, New Jersey state senator and superior court judge
- Paul Goldberger (born 1950), architectural critic, educator, journalist, and Pulitzer Prize winner
- Al Haig (1922–1982), jazz pianist, best known as one of the pioneers of bebop
- Ben Hawkins (1944–2017), professional American football wide receiver who played in the NFL for the Philadelphia Eagles and Cleveland Browns, and for the Philadelphia Bell of the World Football League
- Christine E. Haycock (1924–2008), nurse and surgeon who served as a colonel in the United States Army Reserve and as a professor of surgery and Director of Emergency Services at the New Jersey Medical School
- Michael Horn (born 1939), politician who served as the Treasurer of New Jersey from 1984 to 1986
- Lloyd Huck (1922–2012, class of 1940), business executive, philanthropist and aviation enthusiast, who was chairman of pharmaceutical firms Merck & Co. and of Mutual Benefit Life Insurance Company
- Frank Lautenberg (1924–2013, class of 1941), former U.S. Senator from New Jersey
- Richard Nanes (1927–2009; class of 1946), businessman, who was an amateur composer and pianist
- Carlo Jackie Paris (1926–2004), jazz singer and guitarist
- Andrew Pecora (born 1957), hematologist and oncologist who has been involved in the research on the use of stem cells and oncolytic viruses to treat diseases, including cancer
- Stephen Petronio (born 1956, class of 1974), choreographer, dancer and the artistic director of New York City-based Stephen Petronio Company
- Eileen Poiani, mathematician who was the first female mathematics instructor at Saint Peter's University
- Kevin J. Ryan (1969–2018), politician who served in the New Jersey General Assembly representing the New Jersey's 36th legislative district from 2011 to 2012
- Frederick Scalera (born 1958, class of 1976), politician represented the 36th Legislative District in the New Jersey General Assembly from 2003 to 2010
- Martha Stewart (born 1941, then Martha Helen Kostyra, class of 1959) business magnate, TV celebrity, author, editor and homemaking advocate
- Chief Jay Strongbow (1928–2012), professional wrestler who was inducted into the WWE Hall of Fame
- Tariq Subhani (born 1971), Pakistani politician who was a Member of the Provincial Assembly of the Punjab, from May 2013 to May 2018
- Geerat J. Vermeij (born 1946, class of 1965), professor of geology at the University of California at Davis
- Lynne Viola (born 1955, class of 1973), scholar on the Soviet Union, who is a professor at the University of Toronto
