= Connie Siskowski =

United States activist for young people

Connie Siskowski is a United States activist for young people who are caring for ill, disabled, or aging family members. She was named as a Purpose Prize winner in 2009 and a top 10 CNN Hero in 2012.

== Life ==
Siskowski grew up in Nutley, New Jersey. When her parents divorced, she went to live with her grandparents. When she was 11, she cared for her ailing grandfather for 2 years until his death. Her grandfather suffered from chronic heart disease. After her grandfather's death, she became a candy striper and volunteered with a local junior first aid squad. After graduating high school, she went on to attend nursing school Johns Hopkins University on a full scholarship. She earned a master's degree in public administration with a major in Health Administration from New York University. After becoming a registered nurse, she gained advanced degrees in cardiac nursing and then as a Licensed Nursing Home Administrator. She also went on to get a PhD in Educational Leadership from Lynn University. She moved to Boca Raton, Florida from New Jersey in 1990.

== Career ==
Siskowski became a registered nurse in Maryland in 1968, then in New Jersey and Florida. She worked in the health care system for over 30 years. She worked in settings such as hospitals, home care, and hospice nursing. She also founded a healthcare company, MD To You, which sent doctors into the home.

== Activism ==
Siskowski founded her first nonprofit centered around family caregiving in the late 1990s. The group provided volunteer support services to help people who were homebound and caregiving families, ultimately changing its name to Volunteers for the Homebound and Family Caregivers (VHFC), Inc. The program was founded in 1998 with seed money from the Robert Wood Johnson Foundation's Faith in Action program. Siskowski worked with researchers at Palm Beach Atlantic University and the Palm Beach County school district to help her understand the scope of the youth caregiving problem, and that is when she discovered that thousands of middle and high school children are caregivers. This impetus also led to the first national study on children caregivers in 2005.

Afterward, Siskowski decided to focus solely on youth caregiving. By the end of 2009 VHFC changed its corporate name to the American Association for Caregiving Youth (AACY) in Palm Beach County, Florida. In 2006 the first Caregiving Youth Project began at Boca Raton Community Middle School. The organization is perhaps the first of its kind to be founded in the United States. As of 2012, the program has helped over 550 children. This organization was also helped by the Robert Wood Johnson Foundation. It also supports hundreds of students at a time. Her organization, located in Boca Raton, Florida, started the Caregiving Youth Project. The Caregiving Youth Project acts as a system of early intervention to aid youth that are caregivers. It is also said to be the first organization of its kind in the United States. The organization provides support services to the youth in school, out of school and at home. Since 2006, the program has expanded to 25 area middle and high schools. The program also follows children throughout their grade school education. The program also provides children with a home study and also provides education about factors the children will need to know in order to be better caregivers. The program relies on local funding and from donations. Children also are connected to other children in the same situation, even in different countries. They also are offered a getaway called Camp Treasure, where they get a chance to go away to camp.

== Awards ==
Siskowski received the Purpose Prize in 2009. In 2009, she was also named an Ashoka Fellow, which is a lifetime fellowship to expand her organization. She was also named a Top 10 CNN Hero in 2012. She was also nominated for a Blue Dove award in 2012 and more recently the Johns Hopkins Distinguished Alumna Award and has a Star in the Boca Raton Walk of Recognition. She has also hosted local awards ceremonies.
