= Eileen Poiani =

American mathematician

Eileen Louise Poiani is an American mathematician. She was the first female mathematics instructor at Saint Peter's University in New Jersey, where she is a professor of mathematics, former vice president, and special assistant to the president of the university. She was the first female president of Pi Mu Epsilon.

== Education ==
Poiani grew up as a fourth-generation resident of Nutley, New Jersey, where she graduated from Nutley High School. She was an undergraduate in the Douglass Residential College of Rutgers University, earning Phi Beta Kappa honors, and remained at Rutgers for graduate study in mathematics. Her 1971 doctoral dissertation, Mean Cesàro Summability of Laguerre and Hermite Series and Asymptotic Estimates of Laguerre and Hermite Polynomials, concerned Cesàro summation, Laguerre polynomials, and Hermite polynomials; her doctoral advisor was Benjamin Muckenhoupt, the namesake of Muckenhoupt weights.

== Career ==
In 1967, before she completed her doctorate, Poiani joined the Saint Peter's University faculty as a mathematics instructor. This was one year after Saint Peter's University had begun admitting women, and Poiani became the university's first female mathematics instructor, and one of only seven women on the university faculty. She taught mathematics for 35 years, and was named a full professor in 1980. Saint Peter's is a Jesuit school, and Poiani was an early advocate of attention to the principle of cura personalis in Jesuit higher education. She has also been described as having "passionate interest in promoting the status of women and minorities in mathematics".

In 2000, after long-time service to the university as Executive Assistant to the President and Assistant to the President for Planning, she became the university's vice president for student affairs, and the university's first female vice president. In 2011 she became special assistant to the president.

== Service ==
In 1975, at the invitation of the Mathematical Association of America, Poiani founded and became director of Women and Mathematics. This was a national program that sponsored women in mathematics to speak to female high school students, with the goal of providing role models to the students and encourage them to continue in mathematics. She continued to lead the program until stepping down in 1981.

She has also served the Mathematical Association of America as governor of the New Jersey Section, and the National Academy of Sciences as chair of the U.S. Commission on Mathematical Instruction. She was the first woman to be elected as president of the mathematics society Pi Mu Epsilon, serving as president for 1987–1990.

== Recognition ==
Pi Mu Epsilon gave Poiani their C. C. MacDuffee Award for Distinguished Service in 1995. In 2003 Poiani was given New Jersey's Women of Achievement award. Saint Peter's University named Poiani an honorary alumna in 2017. The Association for Women in Mathematics has included her in the 2020 class of AWM Fellows for "her sustained commitment to encouraging women and the underrepresented at all educational levels to pursue their study of mathematics to keep all career doors open; for founding MAA’s WAM: Women and Mathematics Lectureship Program; for leadership in Pi Mu Epsilon; and for fostering an appreciation for the power of mathematics".
