= Lloyd Huck =

J. Lloyd Huck
- Born: July 17, 1922; Brooklyn, New York
- Died: December 4, 2012 (aged 90); State College, Pennsylvania
- Citizenship: United States
- Education: Pennsylvania State University
- Occupations: Business executive, philanthropist
- Spouse: Dorothy Foehr

John Lloyd Huck (July 17, 1922 – December 4, 2012 ) was a business executive, philanthropist, and aviation enthusiast. He was chairman of pharmaceutical firms Merck & Co. and Nova Pharmaceutical Corporation, as well as Mutual Benefit Life Insurance Company.

== Early life and education ==
Huck was born in Brooklyn, New York, and grew up in Nutley, New Jersey, where he graduated from Nutley High School in 1940. He graduated from the Pennsylvania State University in 1943 with a degree in chemistry.

== Career ==
After graduating from Penn State, Huck began his career as a research chemist for Hoffmann-La Roche. In 1958, he joined the Merck Sharp & Dohme division of Merck & Co. as a director of marketing. He became vice president of marketing planning in 1966 and subsequently vice president for sales & marketing, executive vice president and then president of the division in 1973.

In 1975, Huck was named a senior vice president of Merck & Co. He then went on to become executive vice president in 1977 and then president and chief operating officer in 1978. He was named chairman of the board in 1985, one year prior to his retirement in 1986.

After retiring from Merck, Huck joined the board of Nova Pharmaceutical Corporation, where he served for several years as chairman before retiring in 1991. Huck had served on the boards of Amstar Corporation, AMF, Amoco, and the Mutual Benefit Life Insurance Company, where he was also chairman.

Huck was trustee emeritus of the board of trustees of the Pennsylvania State University and a former president of that board. He also served as a member of the university's Grand Destiny Campaign steering committee.

== Philanthropy ==
Lloyd and his wife Dottie donated more than $40 million to Penn State. The university's Huck Institutes of the Life Sciences is named for them. They were named the university's 2008 Renaissance Fund Honorees.

Additionally, Huck endowed the John Lloyd Huck Institute for Management Science Research at Royal Holloway, University of London and the University of Reading in England in 2000.

== Personal life ==
Huck was married to the former Dorothy B. Foehr of Philadelphia, also a 1943 Penn State graduate, and resided in State College, Pennsylvania. They had a son and two daughters.
