= Nutley Public Schools =

School district in Essex County, New Jersey, US

Address
- 315 Franklin Avenue Nutley, Essex County, New Jersey, 07110; United States
- Coordinates: 40.82075°N 74.167414°W

District information
- Grades: PreK-12
- Superintendent: Kent Bania
- Business administrator: Belgica Polanco (acting)
- Schools: 7

Students and staff
- Enrollment: 4,034 (as of 2021–22)
- Faculty: 328.6 FTEs
- Student–teacher ratio: 12.3:1

Other information
- District Factor Group: FG
- Website: www.nutleyschools.org
Ind.	Per pupil	District spending	Rank (*)	K-12 average	%± vs. average
1A	Total Spending	$16,226	20	$18,891	−14.1%
1	Budgetary Cost	13,289	29	14,783	−10.1%
2	Classroom Instruction	8,304	33	8,763	−5.2%
6	Support Services	1,637	11	2,392	−31.6%
8	Administrative Cost	1,599	75	1,485	7.7%
10	Operations & Maintenance	1,366	21	1,783	−23.4%
13	Extracurricular Activities	298	71	268	11.2%
16	Median Teacher Salary	67,542	69	64,043
Data from NJDoE 2014 Taxpayers' Guide to Education Spending. *Of K-12 districts with more than 3,500 students. Lowest spending=1; Highest=103

Nutley Public Schools are a comprehensive community public school district that serves students in kindergarten through twelfth grade from Nutley, in Essex County, in the U.S. state of New Jersey.

As of the 2022–23 school year, the district, comprised of seven schools, had an enrollment of 4,072 students and 324.5 classroom teachers (on an FTE basis), for a student–teacher ratio of 12.3:1.

The district had been classified by the New Jersey Department of Education as being in District Factor Group "FG", the fourth-highest of eight groupings. District Factor Groups organize districts statewide to allow comparison by common socioeconomic characteristics of the local districts. From lowest socioeconomic status to highest, the categories are A, B, CD, DE, FG, GH, I and J.

== Awards and recognition ==
The district was selected as one of the top "100 Best Communities for Music Education in America 2005" by the American Music Conference.

The NAMM Foundation named the district in its 2008 survey of the "Best Communities for Music Education", which included 110 school districts nationwide. The district was also named in the NAMM Foundation's 2009 survey of the "Best Communities for Music Education", which included 124 school districts nationwide. It also attained this honor in 2010, 2011 and 2013.

Nutley's schools, much like other Essex county communities, compete in various academic competitions on town, county, state, and even national levels. Popular in both the elementary and middle schools is the "Academically Speaking" county competition, which tests knowledge of almost all subjects and pits a carefully selected town-wide team against others from neighboring municipalities such as Bloomfield, Livingston, and Montclair.

Nutley's teams have routinely finished in the semi-finals or finals, and their middle school team won for the first time in 2007. It also won the competition in 2012. Nutley also sends two representatives to compete for a spot in the Scripps National Spelling Bee and one for the National Geographic Bee. They have an active "Forensics" program in both the middle and elementary schools, in which talented students dramatize famous fictional works, and finish well in the semi-statewide MathCounts competition, finishing in the top half among some of the top schools in northern New Jersey two years running.

== Schools ==
Schools in the district (with 2021–22 enrollment data from the National Center for Education Statistics) are:

Elementary schools (PreK/K-5)

- Lincoln School with 448 students in grades K-6. Lincoln was built in 1915, with further construction occurring in 1929. It is located at 301 Harrison Street.
  - Brooke Benavides, principal
- Radcliffe School with 346 students in grades K-6. Located at 379 Bloomfield Avenue, it is the newest elementary school and was built in 1955.
  - Michael Kearney, principal
- Spring Garden School with 439 students in grades PreK-6. Located at 59 South Spring Garden Avenue, the school was constructed in 1917 and expanded in 1927.
  - Laurie LaGuardia, principal
- Washington School with 484 students in grades K-6. Washington was constructed in 1911 and expanded in 1927. It is the second oldest elementary school still in use in Nutley. It is located at 155 Washington Avenue.
  - Douglas T. Jones, principal
- Yantacaw School with 480 students in grades K-6. Constructed in 1902, with an expansion in 1929, it is the oldest of the elementary schools still in use. It is located at 20 Yantacaw Place.
  - Frank Francia, principal

Middle school

- John H. Walker Middle School with 618 students in grades 6-8. Located at 325 Franklin Avenue, the building served as Nutley's high school until 1959.
  - Joseph Materia, principal

High school

- Nutley High School with 1,163 students in grades 9-12
  - Denis Williams, principal

== Administration ==
Core members of the district's administration are:

- Kent Bania, superintendent
- Belgica Polanco, acting business administrator

In May 2024, a state monitor was named to oversee the district's finances and a loan of $7 million was given to cover a discrepancy in the district's finances. David DiPisa, the district's business administrator and board secretary, was placed on administrative leave.

== Board of education ==
The district's board of education, comprised of nine members, sets policy and oversees the fiscal and educational operation of the district through its administration. As a Type II school district, the board's trustees are elected directly by voters to serve three-year terms of office on a staggered basis, with three seats up for election each year held (since 2012) as part of the November general election. The board appoints a superintendent to oversee the district's day-to-day operations and a business administrator to supervise the business functions of the district.

For the 2025–26 school year, trustees of the Nutley Board of Education are:

- Salvatore Ferraro, Board President (term expires December 2026)
- Salvatore Balsamo, Board Vice President (2026)
- Lisa Danchak-Martin (2026)
- Nicholas Scotti (2027)
- Teri Quirk (2028)
- Thomas D'Elia (2028)
- Daniel Fraginals (2027)
- Stephen Gilberti (2027)
- Steffan R. Delpiano (2028)
