= Alma Dea Morani =

US plastic surgeon

Alma Dea Morani (1907–2001) was a plastic surgeon. She is widely accepted as being the first female plastic surgeon in the United States and was the first female member accepted into the American Society of Plastic and Reconstructive Surgeons in 1948.

== Early life ==
Born in New York City to Salvatore Natali and Amalia Gracci Morani, Alma Dea Morani was the daughter to sculptors and painters. Her parents encouraged her to pursue a career in sculpture and follow a similar path, viewing medicine as an unsuitable profession for women. Growing up, she was exposed to her father's work which was heavy in religious symbolism. Religious art containing icons and emblems was used to spread the religious messages and teachings at the time. Morani's father, through his work as a sculptor, was most well known for sculpting surgeons' hands. Morani's love for art, inspired by her father's works, influenced her to pursue a career in plastic surgery. While in her mid-teens Morani was an active Girl Scout. Through Girl Scouts, Morani learned skills that allowed her to assist and treat minor medical injuries. This experience, as well as her interest in biology, inspired her to pursue a career in medicine, and her love for art, drew her specifically to plastic surgery.

== Education ==
Alma Dea Morani completed her undergraduate education at New York University (NYU) in 1928. She then went on to attend the Women's Medical College of Pennsylvania (WMCP), now known as Drexel University, and graduated in 1931. Morani continued on to complete her residency there in 1935. Upon graduating, she became the first female surgical intern in New Jersey and was only allowed to work as a surgical assistant whilst applying to various surgical training courses. She had to apply for plastic surgery training 6 times before she was finally accepted, and she finished this training in 1948.

== Career ==
Morani was the first female resident at WMCP until 1935. She did not start practicing plastic surgery until 1938, at this time she was known for being the first female plastic surgeon in the United States. To further improve her skillset as a surgeon, Morani went on to attend the American College of Surgeons in 1941. Morani faced various obstacles while pursuing training as a plastic surgeon. She applied six times over a six year time period before she was finally accepted by J. Brown, at Barnes Hospital in St. Louis in 1946. Morani eventually returned to WMCP where she became involved in higher education. She began by giving lectures and worked her way up the ranks to become a full professor over a span of 27 years. Having maintained a strong passion in both surgery and art throughout the course of her life, Morani was successful in incorporating both into her lectures.

Morani was philanthropically and politically active. During World War II Morani raised funds to help keep clinic doors open in Philippines, Taiwan, Russia, and the Balkans. In addition, she provided pro-bono care to those serving the country, volunteering at Valley Forge Hospital performing reconstructive surgery on wounded soldiers. Politically, Morani was active in speaking out in favor of women's rights. Morani pushed for women to be able to enter the field of medicine as easily as men. She also played a role in women's health care issues and medical education on an international level.

== Achievement ==
Morani was the first female member accepted into the American Society of Plastic and Reconstructive Surgeons. In 1948, Morani founded The Hand Clinic at Women's Medical College Hospital where students were able to get hands-on experience with patients.

Morani also co-founded a professional society for plastic surgeons in Pennsylvania in 1955. This society was called the Robert H. Ivy Society.

Morani also left a lasting impression on the art community. With her contribution of the Morani Gallery of Art, her work can be seen on display today. A majority of Morani's art was inspired by her work in medicine. This is why her Gallery is located inside her alma mater, which was later renamed, The Medical College of Pennsylvania. The Medical College of Pennsylvania is the country's only medical school with an art gallery.

== The Alma Dea Morani, MD Renaissance Woman Award ==
The Alma Dea Morani M.D., Renaissance Women Award was created in her name in 2000 to honor women physicians or scientists who made compelling contributions apart from medicine, as well as, facilitating the practice and competency of medicine. The award is presented in the shape of a surgeons hand to not only represent both Morani and her father's passion for sculpting, but also to showcase the power our hands have that drives our capacity to express and ultimately gives people a purpose.

- 2000: Alma Dea Morani M.D., FACS
- 2001: Barbara Barlow M.D., FACS
- 2002: Carola B. Eisenburg, M.D.
- 2003: Mary Ellen Avery M.D.
- 2004: Christine E. Haycock M.D., FACS
- 2005: Audrey E. Evans M.D.
- 2006: Mary Guinan Ph.D., M.D.
- 2007: Catherine D. DeAngelis M.D. MPH
- 2008: Ellen R. Gritz Ph.D.
- 2009: Carol C. Nadelson M.D.
- 2010: Marjorie S. Sirridge M.D.
- 2011: Rita Charon M.D., Ph.D.
- 2012: N. Lynn Eckhert M.D., MPH, DrPH
- 2013: Florence Pat Haseltine Ph.D., M.D.
- 2014: Deborah German M.D.
- 2015: Mary-Claire King Ph.D.
- 2016: Paula Johnson M.D., MPH
- 2017: Elizabeth Blackburn Ph.D., and Carol Greider Ph. D.
- 2018: Margaret Hamburg M.D.
- 2019: Linda P. Fried M.D., MPH
- 2020: Vivian W. Pinn M.D.
- 2021: Jennifer A. Doudna Ph.D.
- 2022: JoAnn Manson M.D., DrPH
- 2023: Nanette K. Wenger M.D.
- 2024: Myrna M. Weissman Ph.D.
- 2025: Joycelyn Elders M.D.
- 2026: Jann Murray-García M.D., MPH
