= Frederick Dana Marsh =

American artist

Frederick Dana Marsh (1872 – December 20, 1961) was an American illustrator.

== Biography ==
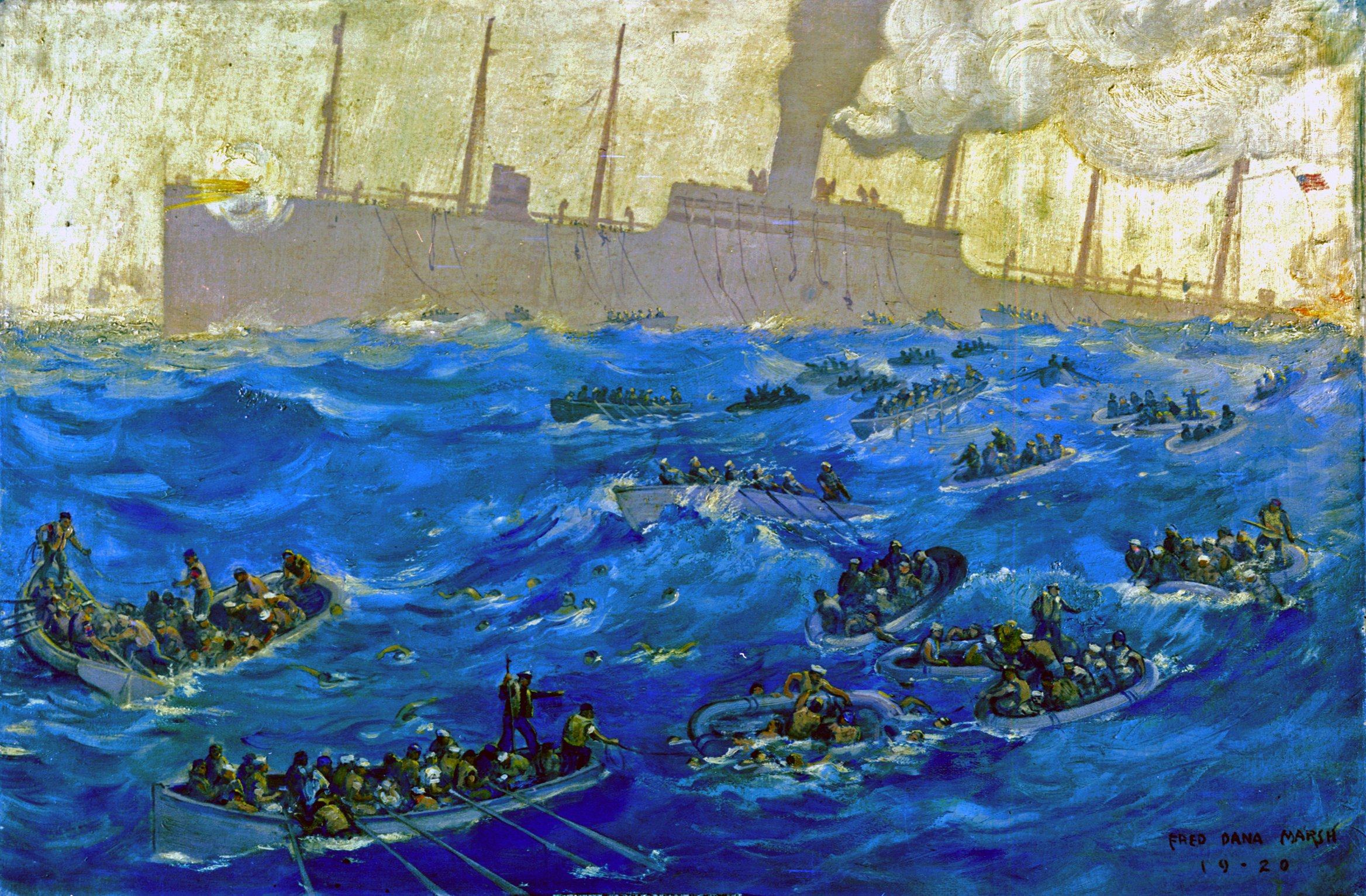
The Sinking of the USS President Lincoln, 1920

Born in 1872 to a prosperous Chicago stockyard merchant, Marsh attended the School of the Art Institute of Chicago, where he worked with artists preparing murals for the Chicago World's Fair in 1893, learning the big-brush techniques of mural painting.

He went to Paris, where in 1895 he married Alice Randall, a fellow Chicago art student. While living in a studio in Montparnasse, they had two sons, James and Reginald, both of whom achieved renown as artists. His Lady in Scarlet, a full-length portrait of his wife, won the International Bronze Medal and was exhibited extensively. It now resides in the Newark Museum in New Jersey.

Marsh and his family returned to New York at the turn of the century, moving to Nutley, New Jersey, where they acquired a home located on The Enclosure, a street that had been established as an artists' colony some decades earlier by the American painter Frank Fowler. In 1914 they moved to the well-known New Rochelle artist colony in New Rochelle, New York.

He created paintings for wealthy clients, as well as a series of murals entitled "Allegories of Industry" for the New York Engineering Society Library. Marsh also produced a number of terra cotta murals entitled "Maritime History of the Hudson" for the Hotel McAlpin in New York, which were later relocated to the New York City subway in 2000. During World War I, he produced patriotic posters for the publicity department of the Navy.

Marsh largely retired from commercial art in 1928. During the following year his parents, wife and youngest son all died. In 1930, he married the artist Mabel Van Alstyne, and in 1931 moved to Ormond Beach, Florida where he built a large Streamline Moderne beachside home known as the "Battleship House" (since demolished), which was extensively decorated with murals and relief sculptures. With assistance from his wife, Marsh continued to create artworks while in Florida, including the statue of "Chief Tomokie" at Tomoka State Park and four sculptures of muses for the exterior of the Peabody Auditorium in Daytona Beach. For the rest of his life, Marsh would also continue to split his time between Ormond Beach and Woodstock, New York.

Marsh died on December 20, 1961.
