= Christine E. Haycock =

American nurse and surgeon

Dr. Christine E. Haycock (January 7, 1924 – January 23, 2008) was an American nurse and surgeon who served as a colonel in the United States Army Reserve, and as a professor of surgery and Director of Emergency Services at the New Jersey Medical School.

== Background and education ==
Born in Mount Vernon, New York, Haycock was raised in Richmond, Virginia, and Nutley, New Jersey, where she graduated from Nutley High School. She attended the Presbyterian Hospital School of Nursing and earned a bachelor's degree from the University of Chicago. She served in the United States Army during World War II in the Cadet Nurse Corps. After the war, she earned her medical degree from the Downstate Medical School of the State University of New York in 1952, and went on to become the first woman intern at Walter Reed Army Medical Center. In 1952, she became the first woman officer to serve as a physician in the U.S. Army Medical Corps. Following the Korean War, Haycock became the first woman to hold a major command in New Jersey, as head of the Army's 322nd General Hospital. She completed her surgical residency in New York before returning to New Jersey, where she opened a private practice in general surgery. During the course of her time with the Army Medical Corps, she would graduate from the US Army Command and General Staff College and the US Army War College. She also earned a master's degree in political science from Rutgers University.

== Career and professional associations ==
Haycock joined the faculty of the University of Medicine and Dentistry of New Jersey (now New Jersey Medical School) as associate professor of surgery and director of emergency services in 1968 and helped establish the trauma center at University Hospital in Newark. She became known as an expert on uterine cancer and in sports medicine (especially for women). She was elected a Fellow of the American College of Surgeons. 1980 saw the publication of the book Sports Medicine for the Athletic Female, which she edited. Haycock spent a term (1981–82) as president of the American Medical Women’s Association, having been active in that organization as president of the New Jersey branch. In 1984 she retired from the Army Medical Corps as a colonel, having served as a reservist since her time in World War II and Korea, totaling 38 years of military service.

In 2004, Haycock was awarded the Alma Dea Morani Renaissance Woman Award by the Women in Medicine Legacy Foundation.

In 2005, she was inducted into the Nutley Hall of Fame.

In 2011, a Women's History Month exhibit by the National Guard Militia Museum of New Jersey in Lawrenceville centered around Haycock's role as a pioneer for women in Army medical service.

== Private life ==
Haycock was active in women's fencing in the late 1940s (having been on the school team while at the University of Chicago), participating in the 1949 national championships in the foil, and even gave an exhibition with another woman fencer at a 1954 Japanese fencing tournament. In a later interview, she recalled ruefully that her time in fencing gave her considerable practical knowledge of breast injuries, and that she was black-and-blue "all the time". She found the existing protection (padded jackets) inadequate for female fencers, and wore a metal protector.

She also pitched for several softball teams, and while studying medicine in 1957 was pitching for the Linden, New Jersey Arians of the National Girls' Softball League. She told a reporter that she'd taken up baseball because in her all-boy neighborhood, "it was either play ball or be lonesome." She tried out for her high school baseball team, but the coach wouldn't let her play; so at age 15, she became the first female player for the Essex County Semi-Pro League. She was a photographer (elected a Fellow of the Photographic Society of America), videographer, ham radio operator and dog breeder. An active member of science fiction fandom (she served as treasurer of the Lunarians), Haycock was married to fellow fan Sam Moskowitz; they were Guests of Honor at Disclave 9.

She died January 23, 2008, at a hospice in Nutley.
