= Alan Branigan =

Ivorian footballer (born 1975)

Personal information
- Date of birth: February 9, 1975 (age 51)
- Place of birth: Ivory Coast
- Position: Defender

College career
Years	Team	Apps	(Gls)
1993–1996	Rutgers Scarlet Knights		

Senior career*
Years	Team	Apps	(Gls)
1997	Orlando Sundogs	5	(0)
1997	Carolina Dynamo	3	(1)
1997	Worcester Wildfire		
1998–2000	Hampton Roads Mariners	55	(1)
- * Club domestic league appearances and goals

Alan Branigan (February 9, 1975) is an Ivorian soccer defender who spent his entire career in the United States.

Branigan was born on February 9, 1975. He and his family moved to the United States when he was seven and settled in Nutley, New Jersey. In 1993, he graduated from Nutley High School. He attended Rutgers University, where he was a 1996 Third-Team All-American soccer player.

On February 1, 1997, the Dallas Burn selected Branigan in the second round (sixteenth overall) of the 1997 MLS College Draft. The Burn released him during the preseason and he signed with the Orlando Sundogs. When the Sundogs began to experience financial difficulties, the team released Branigan and several other players. He played three games for the Carolina Dynamo. He then joined the Worcester Wildfire for the remainder of the 1997 season. In 1998, he signed with the Hampton Roads Mariners and remained with the team for three seasons.

Branigan was the coach of the James Caldwell High School boys soccer team, where he now teaches.
