= Benjamin Muckenhoupt =

Benjamin Muckenhoupt (December 22, 1933, Boston – April 13, 2020, Whippany, New Jersey) was an American mathematician, specializing in analysis. He is known for the introduction of Muckenhoupt weights.

== Biography ==
After graduating in 1950 from Newton High School (renamed in 1974 Newton North High School), Benjamin Muckenhoupt matriculated at Harvard University. where he graduated in 1954 with an A.B. At Harvard, by his outstanding score on the 1954 William Lowell Putnam Competition, he became a Putnam Fellow. At the University of Chicago, he graduated in 1955 with an M.Sc. and in 1958 with a Ph.D. His Ph.D. thesis On certain singular integrals was supervised by Antoni Zygmund. In the department of the mathematics of Rutgers University, he was an associate professor from 1963 to 1970 and a full professor from 1970 to 1991, when he retired as professor emeritus. For many years, he suffered from progressive supranuclear palsy.

The main focus of Muckenhoupt's mathematical research was harmonic analysis and weighted norm inequalities. At the Institute for Advanced Study, he held visiting positions for the academic years 1968–1970 and 1975–1976. At the State University of New York at Albany he was a visiting professor for the academic year 1970–1971.

His doctoral students include Eileen Poiani.

Upon his death he was survived by his widow, a daughter, a son, and three grandchildren.

== Selected publications ==
- Albert, A. A.; Muckenhoupt, Benjamin (1957). "On matrices of trace zero". Michigan Mathematical Journal. 4. doi:10.1307/mmj/1028990168. MR 0083961.
- Muckenhoupt, B.; Stein, E. M. (1965). "Classical expansions and their relation to conjugate harmonic functions". Transactions of the American Mathematical Society. 118: 17. doi:10.1090/S0002-9947-1965-0199636-9. MR 0199636.
- —— (1969). "Hermite conjugate expansions". Transactions of the American Mathematical Society. 139: 243–260. doi:10.1090/S0002-9947-1969-0249918-0. MR 0249918.
- —— (1969). "Poisson integrals for Hermite and Laguerre expansions". Transactions of the American Mathematical Society. 139: 231–242. doi:10.1090/S0002-9947-1969-0249917-9. MR 0249917.
- —— (1970). "Conjugate functions for Laguerre expansions". Transactions of the American Mathematical Society. 147 (2): 403–418. doi:10.1090/S0002-9947-1970-0252945-9.
- —— (1970). "Mean convergence of Hermite and Laguerre series. I". Transactions of the American Mathematical Society. 147 (2): 419–431. doi:10.1090/S0002-9947-1970-99933-9.
- —— (1970). "Mean convergence of Hermite and Laguerre series. II". Transactions of the American Mathematical Society. 147 (2): 433–460. doi:10.1090/S0002-9947-1970-0256051-9.
- ——; Wheeden, Richard L. (1971). "Weighted norm inequalities for singular and fractional integrals". Transactions of the American Mathematical Society. 161: 249–258. doi:10.1090/S0002-9947-1971-0285938-7.
- Hunt, Richard; ——; Wheeden, Richard (1973). "Weighted norm inequalities for the conjugate function and Hilbert transform". Transactions of the American Mathematical Society. 176: 227. doi:10.1090/S0002-9947-1973-0312139-8.
- ——; Wheeden, Richard (1974). "Weighted norm inequalities for fractional integrals" (PDF). Transactions of the American Mathematical Society. 192: 261–274. doi:10.1090/S0002-9947-1974-0340523-6.
- Andersen, Kenneth F.; —— (1982). "Weighted weak type Hardy inequalities with applications to Hilbert transforms and maximal functions" (PDF). Studia Math. 72 (1): 9–26. doi:10.4064/sm-72-1-9-26.
- Ariño, Miguel A.; —— (1990). "Maximal functions on classical Lorentz spaces and Hardy's inequality with weights for nonincreasing functions". Transactions of the American Mathematical Society. 320 (2): 727–735. doi:10.1090/S0002-9947-1990-0989570-0.
