= Nutley, New Jersey =

Township in Essex County, New Jersey, US

- Township
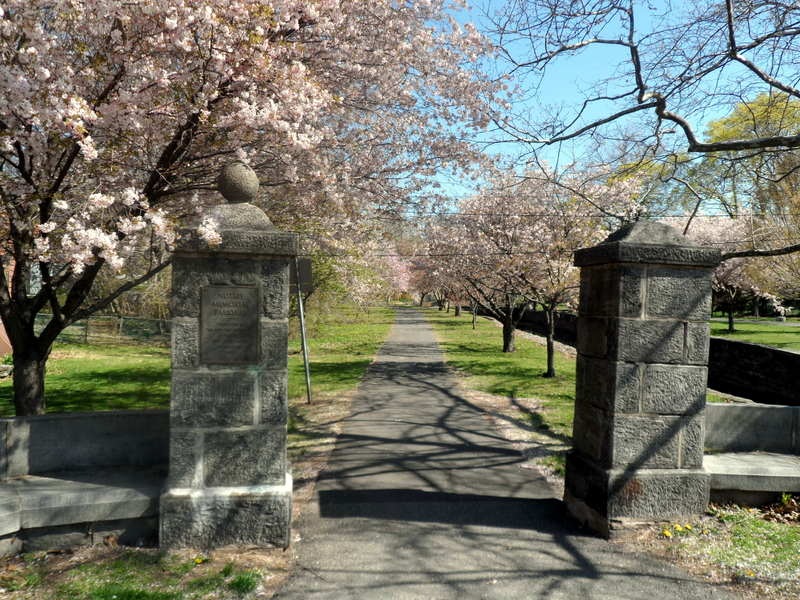
- Nutley Memorial Parkway

- Seal
- Interactive map of Nutley, New Jersey
- Location in Essex County Location in New Jersey Location in the United States
- Coordinates: 40.820616°N 74.15625°W
- Country: United States
- State: New Jersey
- County: Essex
- Incorporated: February 18, 1874, as Franklin Township
- Reincorporated: March 5, 1902, as Nutley

Government
  - Type: Walsh Act
  - Body: Board of Commissioners
  - Mayor: John V. Kelly III (term ends May 16, 2028)
  - Municipal clerk: Eleni Pettas

Area
  - Total: 3.44 sq mi (8.90 km^{2})
  - Land: 3.37 sq mi (8.74 km^{2})
  - Water: 0.046 sq mi (0.12 km^{2}) 1.37%
  - Rank: 316th of 565 in state 13th of 22 in county
- Elevation: 52 ft (16 m)

Population (2020)
  - Total: 30,143
  - Estimate (2024): 30,508
  - Rank: 79th of 565 in state 10th of 22 in county
  - Density: 8,939.2/sq mi (3,451.4/km^{2})
  - Rank: 44th of 565 in state 7th of 22 in county
- Time zone: UTC−05:00 (Eastern (EST))
  - Summer (DST): UTC−04:00 (Eastern (EDT))
- ZIP Code: 07110
- Area code: 973
- FIPS code: 3401353680
- GNIS feature ID: 1729715
- Website: www.nutleynj.org

Nutley is a township in Essex County of the U.S. state of New Jersey. As of the 2020 United States census, the township's population was 30,143, an increase of 1,773 (+6.2%) from the 2010 census count of 28,370, which in turn reflected an increase of 1,008 (+3.7%) from the 27,362 counted in the 2000 census. It is near New York and Newark.

What is now Nutley was originally incorporated as Franklin Township by an act of the New Jersey Legislature on February 18, 1874, from portions of Belleville Township. Nutley was incorporated as a town on March 5, 1902, replacing Franklin Township. In 1981, the town was one of seven Essex County municipalities to pass a referendum to become a township, joining four municipalities that had already made the change, of what would ultimately be more than a dozen Essex County municipalities to reclassify themselves as townships in order take advantage of federal revenue sharing policies that allocated townships a greater share of government aid to municipalities on a per capita basis.

Nutley derived its name from the estate of the Satterthwaite family, established in 1844, which stretched along the Passaic River and from an artist's colony in the area.

== History ==
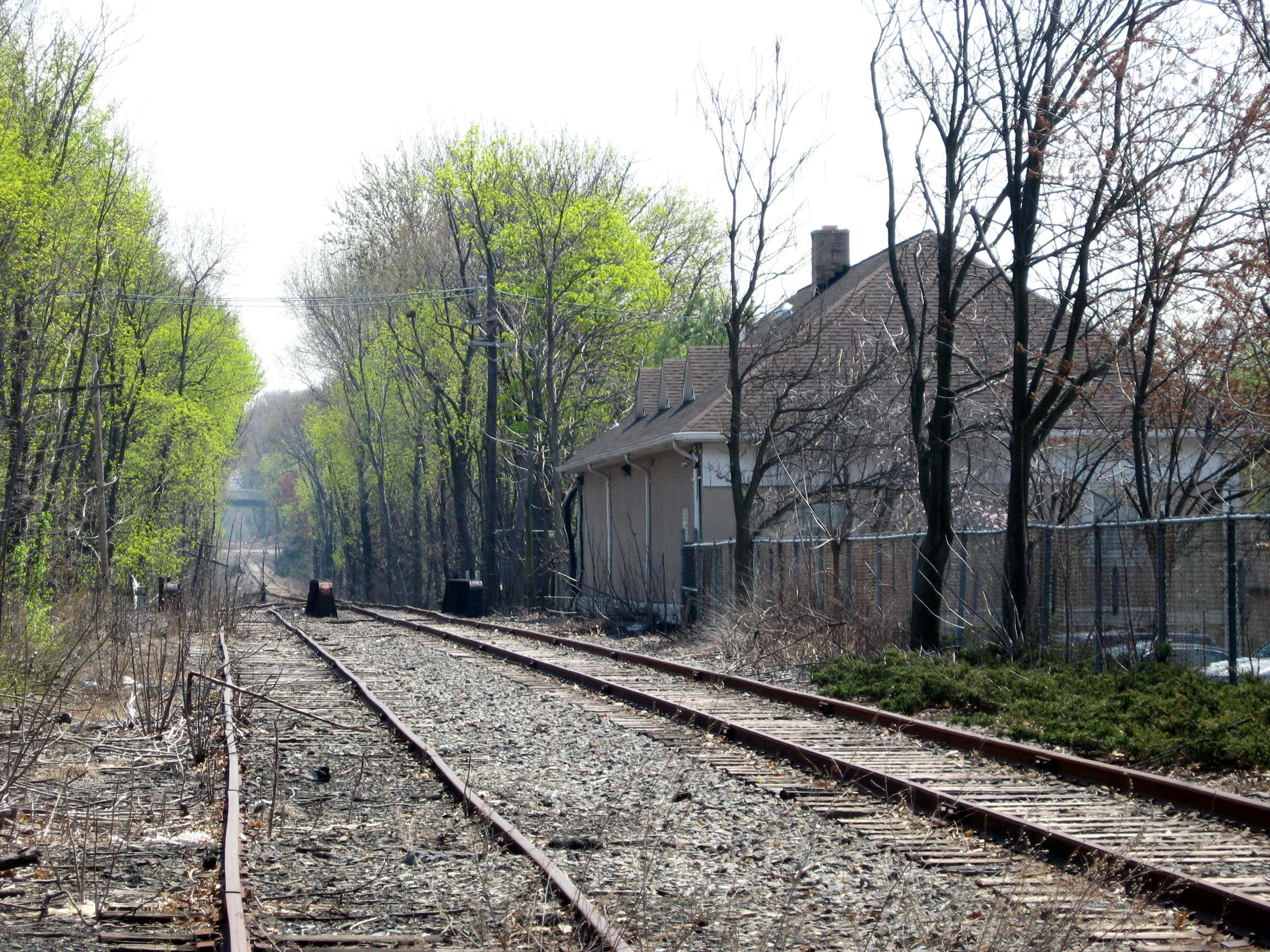
Former railroad station at Franklin Avenue

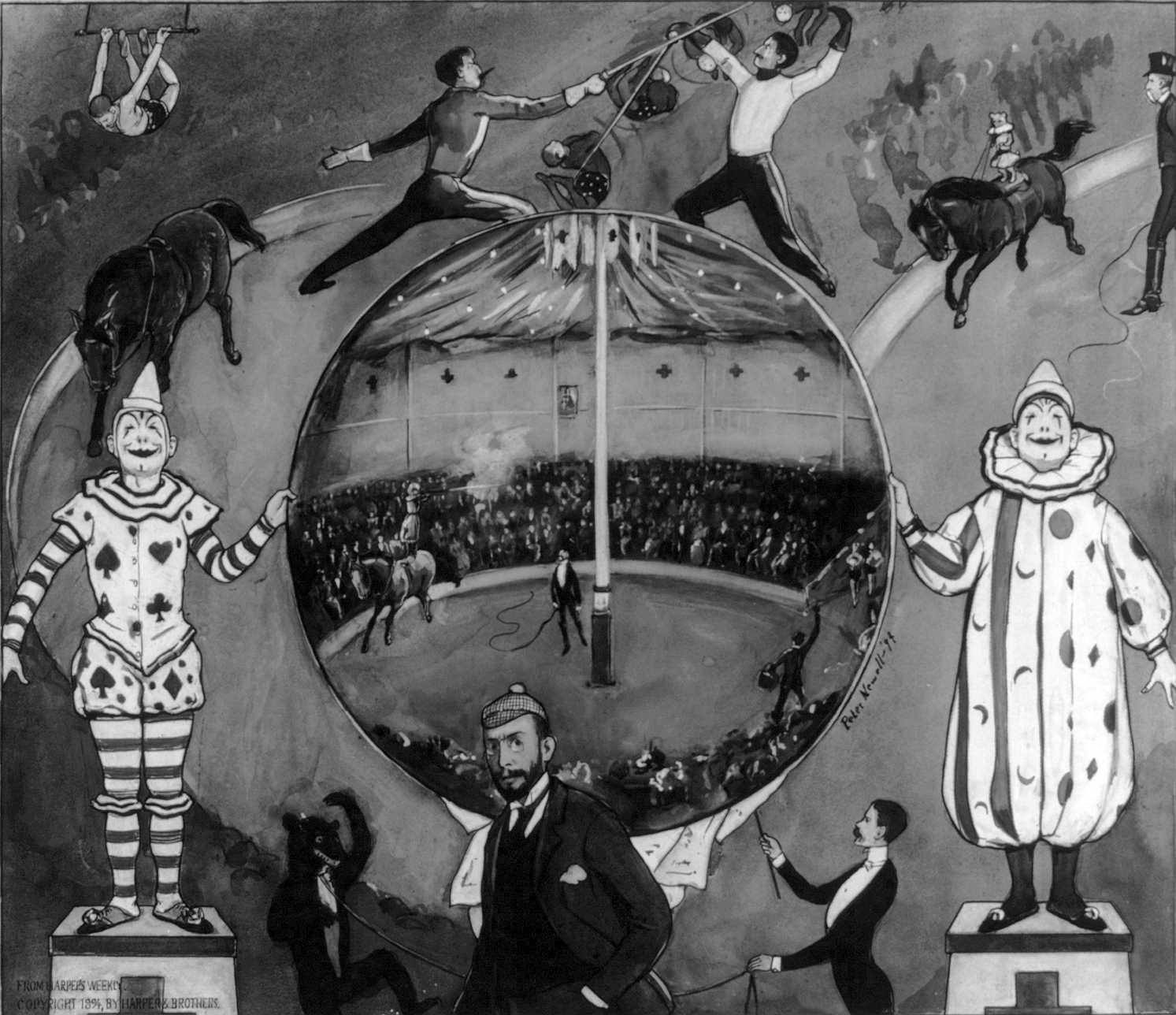
Annie Oakley performing at an amateur circus at Nutley in 1894, to raise funds for the Red Cross

Nutley grew slowly as Newark developed. The first European settler in the area, recorded in the minutes of a Newark town meeting in 1693, was a Dutch planter named Bastian Van Giesen. His son had a home constructed after inheriting the property in 1751 and is now known as Vreeland Homestead. It still stands today on Chestnut Street and was the location of the Nutley Women's Club from 1912 until 2012 when it was sold to the township. The Van Riper House is another building from the era. During the revolutionary war, the Continental Army, under the command of General George Washington, retreated from New York through Essex County and what is now Nutley.

The first brownstone quarry in Nutley is believed to have been in operation by the early 18th century and was the town's first major industry. Jobs at the brownstone quarry in the Avondale section of Nutley provided work for many Italian and Irish immigrants. Mills situated along the Third River in the area now known as Memorial Park I became Nutley's second major industry.

John and Thomas Speer, Joseph Kingsland, and Henry Duncan all operated mills in the town during the 1800s. Current streets in Nutley are named after these mill owners. Henry Duncan built several mills throughout the town and established the village of Franklinville consisting of 30 homes and a few small businesses which later became the center of Nutley. One of Duncan's buildings has been modified and now serves as the town hall. Kingsland Manor is a national historic place.

During the late 1880s, painter Frank Fowler founded an artists' colony on The Enclosure, a dead-end street that is near the Third River, a stream that runs through the town's parks. Later artist residents of the street included Frederick Dana Marsh, Reginald Marsh and muralist Michael Lenson.

Nutley's town historian, John Demmer, is the author of the book in the "Images of America" series titled Nutley; Demmer is also part of The Nutley Historical Society, a not-for-profit organization dedicated to serve the educational, cultural and historical needs of the community. The Nutley Historical Society manages the operation of The Nutley Historical Museum, housed in a former town schoolhouse at 65 Church Street.

Several other historical works on Nutley have been written by local historians, notably the late Ann Troy's Nutley: Yesterday – Today; "Nutley" by Marilyn Peters and Richard O'Connor in the "Then and Now" series; and books about the Nutley Velodrome. The board track racing facility was used in the 1930s for racing midget cars. Local resident Chris Economaki wrote extensively about the Nutley Velodrome in his autobiographical racing history Let Them All Go! as the Velodrome was the first racetrack he had visited as a child.

== Geography ==
According to the United States Census Bureau, the township had a total area of 3.42 square miles (8.86 km^{2}), including 3.37 square miles (8.74 km^{2}) of land and 0.05 square miles (0.12 km^{2}) of water (1.37%).

Unincorporated communities, localities and place names located partially or completely within the township include Avondale, Franklin, Glendale and Yanticaw.

The township borders the municipalities of Belleville and Bloomfield in Essex County; Lyndhurst in Bergen County; and Clifton in Passaic County.

== Demographics ==
Historical population
| Census | Pop. | Note | %± |
|---|---|---|---|
| 1880 | 1,617 | | — |
| 1890 | 2,007 | | 24.1% |
| 1900 | 3,682 | | 83.5% |
| 1910 | 6,009 | | 63.2% |
| 1920 | 9,421 | | 56.8% |
| 1930 | 20,572 | | 118.4% |
| 1940 | 21,954 | | 6.7% |
| 1950 | 26,992 | | 22.9% |
| 1960 | 29,513 | | 9.3% |
| 1970 | 31,913 | | 8.1% |
| 1980 | 28,998 | | −9.1% |
| 1990 | 27,099 | | −6.5% |
| 2000 | 27,362 | | 1.0% |
| 2010 | 28,370 | | 3.7% |
| 2020 | 30,143 | | 6.2% |
| 2024 (est.) | 30,508 | | 1.2% |
Population sources: 1880–1920 1880–1890; 1890–1900 1910 1910–1930; 1940–2000 2000; 2010 2020

=== 2020 census ===
Nutley township, Essex County, New Jersey – Racial and Ethnic Composition (NH = Non-Hispanic) Note: the US Census treats Hispanic/Latino as an ethnic category. This table excludes Latinos from the racial categories and assigns them to a separate category. Hispanics/Latinos may be of any race.
| Race / Ethnicity | Pop 2010 | Pop 2020 | % 2010 | % 2020 |
|---|---|---|---|---|
| White alone (NH) | 21,196 | 18,864 | 74.71% | 62.58% |
| Black or African American alone (NH) | 541 | 928 | 1.91% | 3.08% |
| Native American or Alaska Native alone (NH) | 12 | 38 | 0.04% | 0.13% |
| Asian alone (NH) | 2,789 | 3,518 | 9.83% | 11.67% |
| Pacific Islander alone (NH) | 1 | 13 | 0.00% | 0.04% |
| Some Other Race alone (NH) | 84 | 178 | 0.30% | 0.59% |
| Mixed Race/Multi-Racial (NH) | 393 | 746 | 1.39% | 2.47% |
| Hispanic or Latino (any race) | 3,354 | 5,858 | 11.82% | 19.43% |
| Total | 28,370 | 30,143 | 100.00% | 100.00% |

=== 2010 census ===
The 2010 United States census counted 28,370 people, 11,314 households, and 7,660 families in the township. The population density was 8,384.1 per square mile (3,237.1/km^{2}). There were 11,789 housing units at an average density of 3,484.0 per square mile (1,345.2/km^{2}). The racial makeup was 82.50% (23,405) White, 2.21% (628) Black or African American, 0.13% (36) Native American, 9.95% (2,824) Asian, 0.01% (4) Pacific Islander, 2.97% (842) from other races, and 2.22% (631) from two or more races. Hispanic or Latino of any race were 11.82% (3,354) of the population.

Of the 11,314 households, 29.6% had children under the age of 18; 52.8% were married couples living together; 11.1% had a female householder with no husband present and 32.3% were non-families. Of all households, 27.5% were made up of individuals and 10.2% had someone living alone who was 65 years of age or older. The average household size was 2.50 and the average family size was 3.10.

20.7% of the population were under the age of 18, 7.3% from 18 to 24, 28.5% from 25 to 44, 28.9% from 45 to 64, and 14.5% who were 65 years of age or older. The median age was 40.7 years. For every 100 females, the population had 88.9 males. For every 100 females ages 18 and older there were 86.0 males.

The Census Bureau's 2006–2010 American Community Survey showed that (in 2010 inflation-adjusted dollars) median household income was $76,167 (with a margin of error of +/− $3,896) and the median family income was $98,042 (+/− $4,394). Males had a median income of $64,736 (+/− $4,840) versus $52,410 (+/− $3,558) for females. The per capita income for the borough was $37,706 (+/− $1,918). About 3.1% of families and 4.3% of the population were below the poverty line, including 4.9% of those under age 18 and 5.9% of those age 65 or over.

=== 2000 census ===
As of the 2000 United States census, there were 27,362 people, 10,884 households, and 7,368 families residing in the township. The population density was 8,123.0 inhabitants per square mile (3,136.3/km^{2}). There were 11,118 housing units at an average density of 1, 273.8/km^{2} (3,300.6/sq mi). The racial makeup of the township was 87.95% White, 1.87% African American, 0.05% Native American, 7.10% Asian, 0.04% Pacific Islander, 1.75% from other races, and 1.24% from two or more races. Hispanic or Latino of any race were 6.69% of the population.

As of the 2000 Census, 36.0% of town residents were of Italian ancestry, the 12th-highest percentage of any municipality in the United States, and fifth-highest in New Jersey, among all places with more than 1,000 residents identifying their ancestry.

There were 10,884 households, out of which 29.3% had children under the age of 18 living with them, 54.0% were married couples living together, 10.5% had a female householder with no husband present, and 32.3% were non-families. 27.9% of all households were made up of individuals, and 11.4% had someone living alone who was 65 years of age or older. The average household size was 2.51 and the average family size was 3.11.

In the town the population was spread out, with 21.8% under the age of 18, 6.4% from 18 to 24, 31.6% from 25 to 44, 24.1% from 45 to 64, and 16.1% who were 65 years of age or older. The median age was 39 years. For every 100 females, there were 89.4 males. For every 100 females age 18 and over, there were 85.0 males.

The median income for a household in the township was $59,634, and the median income for a family was $73,264. Males had a median income of $51,121 versus $37,100 for females. The per capita income for the township was $28,039. About 3.4% of families and 4.8% of the population were below the poverty line, including 4.4% of those under age 18 and 7.9% of those age 65 or over.

== Economy ==
Nutley had been the U.S. headquarters of Hoffmann-La Roche and was the site of the creations of the medications Valium and Librium, later becoming one of the major R&D sites for Roche, hosting major research areas in oncology, virology and inflammation. Roche announced in June 2012 that operations at the site would end in 2013, leading to the elimination of 1,000 positions at the company, and that the facility would be shuttered by year end 2015. Located in Nutley since 1929, the company had reached a peak of 10,000 employees on the site, and the $9 million paid by the company in local property taxes accounted for 9% of the township's tax revenues.

== Parks and recreation ==
Nutley's parks include Booth Park, DeMuro Park, Father Glotzbach Park, Msgr Owens Park, Flora Louden Park, Kingsland Park, Memorial Park I, II, III, Nichols Park, and Rheinheimer Park. They offer fields for baseball, football, basketball, lacrosse, roller hockey, and soccer among other sports. The township hosts a weekly Market Walk and Talk beginning and ending at the township farmer's market where participants take a one-hour loop through the local scenic parks.

== Government ==
=== Local representation ===
Nutley has operated a commission form of government under the Walsh Act since 1912. The township is one of 30 municipalities (of the 564) statewide that use the commission form of government. The governing body is comprised of five commissioners, who are elected on a non-partisan basis to serve four-year concurrent terms as part of the May municipal election. The commissioners also serve as department heads in addition to their legislative functions. The Commissioners elect one Commissioner as Mayor. Historically the Commissioner that receives the most votes is appointed Mayor. The mayor is only responsible for their departments and serves as the chair of the commission. The Nutley Police Department provides law enforcement services.

As of 2025 and continuing through May 16, 2028, members of Nutley's Board of Commissioners are Mayor John V. Kelly III (Commissioner of Public Affairs), Thomas J. Evans (Commissioner of Revenue and Finance), Alphonse Petracco (Commissioner of Public Safety), Joseph P. Scarpelli (Commissioner of Public Works) and Mauro G. Tucci (Commissioner of Parks and Public Property).

=== Federal, state and county representation ===
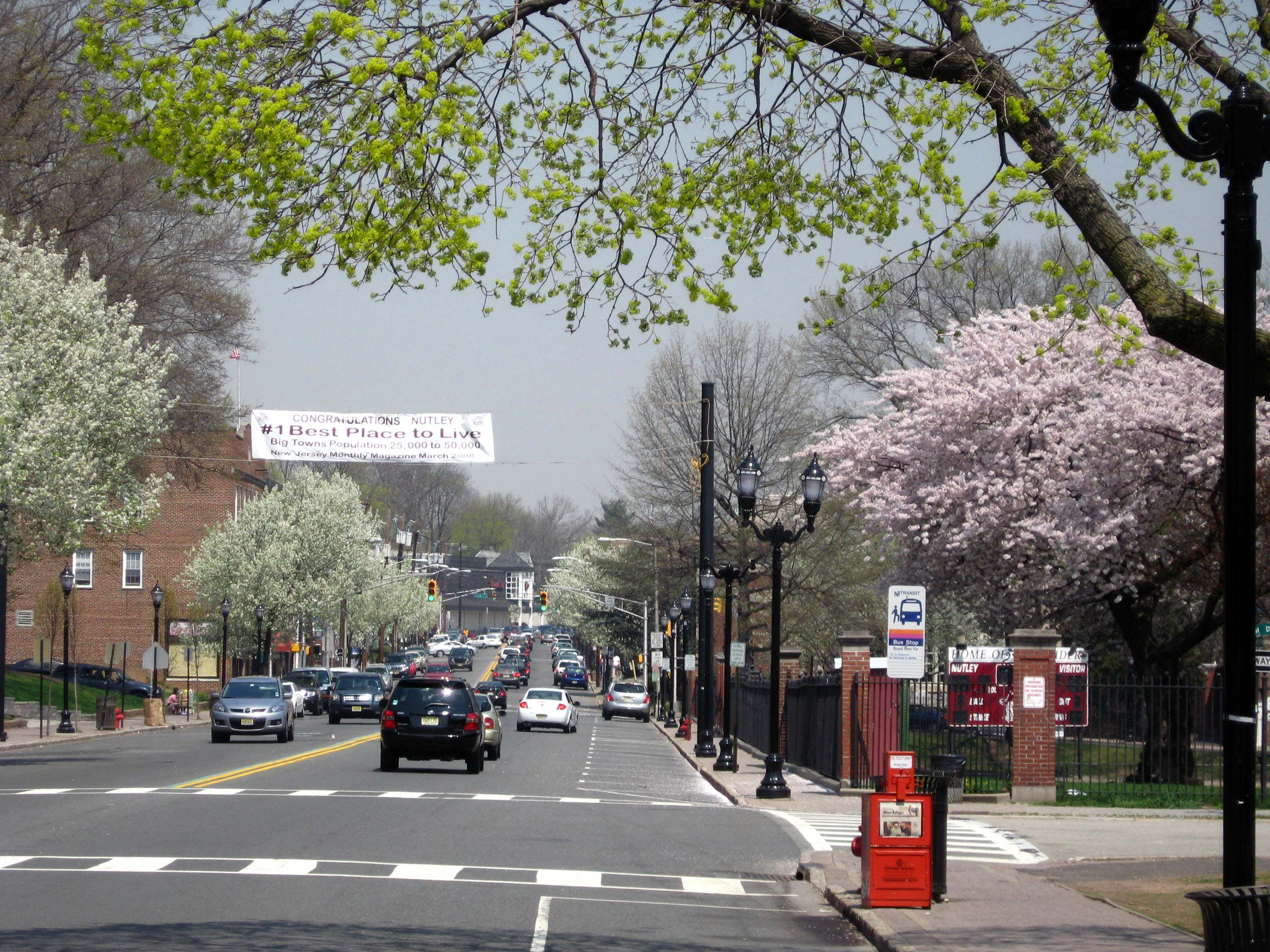
Franklin Avenue, a main shopping street

Nutley is located in the 11th Congressional District and is part of New Jersey's 34th state legislative district.

For the 119th United States Congress, New Jersey's 11th congressional district is represented by Analilia Mejia (D, Glen Ridge) who was elected in a 2026 special election to serve for the remainder of the Congress following the resignation Mikie Sherrill (D, Montclair), who was elected Governor of New Jersey in 2025. New Jersey is represented in the United States Senate by Democrats Cory Booker (Newark, term ends 2027) and Andy Kim (Moorestown, term ends 2031).

For the 2026–2027 session, the 34th legislative district of the New Jersey Legislature is represented in the State Senate by Britnee Timberlake (D, East Orange) and in the General Assembly by Carmen Morales (D, Belleville) and Michael Venezia (D, Bloomfield).

Essex County is governed by a directly elected county executive, with legislative functions performed by the Board of County Commissioners. As of 2025, the County Executive is Joseph N. DiVincenzo Jr. (D, Roseland), whose four-year term of office ends December 31, 2026. The county's Board of County Commissioners is composed of nine members, five of whom are elected from districts and four of whom are elected on an at-large basis. They are elected for three-year concurrent terms and may be re-elected to successive terms at the annual election in November. Essex County's Commissioners are:

Robert Mercado (D, District 1 – Newark's North and East Wards, parts of Central and West Wards; Newark, 2026), A'Dorian Murray-Thomas (D, District 2 – Irvington, Maplewood and parts of Newark's South and West Wards; Newark, 2026), Vice President Tyshammie L. Cooper (D, District 3 - Newark: West and Central Wards; East Orange, Orange and South Orange; East Orange, 2026), Leonard M. Luciano (D, District 4 – Caldwell, Cedar Grove, Essex Fells, Fairfield, Livingston, Millburn, North Caldwell, Roseland, Verona, West Caldwell and West Orange; West Caldwell, 2026), President Carlos M. Pomares (D, District 5 – Belleville, Bloomfield, Glen Ridge, Montclair and Nutley; Bloomfield, 2026), Brendan W. Gill (D, at large; Montclair, 2026), Romaine Graham (D, at large; Irvington, 2026), Wayne Richardson (D, at large; Newark, 2026), Patricia Sebold (D, at-large; Livingston, 2026).

Constitutional officers elected countywide are: Clerk Christopher J. Durkin (D, West Caldwell, 2025), Register of Deeds Juan M. Rivera Jr. (D, Newark, 2029), Sheriff Amir Jones (D, Newark, 2027), and Surrogate Alturrick Kenney (D, Newark, 2028).

=== Politics ===
As of March 2011, there were a total of 18,833 registered voters in Nutley, of which 5,737 (30.5%) were registered as Democrats, 3,753 (19.9%) were registered as Republicans and 9,327 (49.5%) were registered as Unaffiliated. There were 142 voters registered as Libertarians or Greens.

Gubernatorial election results for Nutley
| Year | Republican | | Democratic | | Third party(ies) | |
| Year | No. | % | No. | % | No. | % |
|---|---|---|---|---|---|---|
| 2025 | 5,797 | 47.38% | 6,409 | 52.38% | 30 | 0.25% |
| 2021 | 5,178 | 52.53% | 4,621 | 46.88% | 59 | 0.60% |
| 2017 | 3,044 | 41.43% | 3,967 | 53.99% | 336 | 4.57% |
| 2013 | 4,497 | 57.43% | 3,234 | 41.30% | 100 | 1.28% |
| 2009 | 4,684 | 53.27% | 3,416 | 38.85% | 693 | 7.88% |
| 2005 | 4,029 | 43.69% | 4,957 | 53.76% | 235 | 2.55% |

In the 2016 presidential election, Republican Donald Trump received 49.9% (7,061 votes), edging out Democrat Hillary Clinton with 46.9% (6,634 votes). In the 2012 presidential election, incumbent Democrat Barack Obama received 50.33% of the vote (6,507 votes), ahead of Republican Mitt Romney with 48.52% (6,273 votes) and other candidates with 1.14% (148 votes), among the 12,928 ballots cast by the township's 19,623 registered voters, for a turnout of 65.88%. In the 2008 presidential election, Republican John McCain received 52.4% of the vote (7,325 cast), ahead of Democrat Barack Obama with 45.6% (6,374 votes) and other candidates with 1.2% (163 votes), among the 13,985 ballots cast by the township's 18,853 registered voters, for a turnout of 74.2%. In the 2004 presidential election, Republican George W. Bush received 54.5% of the vote (7,579 ballots cast), outpolling Democrat John Kerry with 43.8% (6,099 votes) and other candidates with 0.6% (106 votes), among the 13,914 ballots cast by the township's 18,087 registered voters, for a turnout percentage of 76.9.

United States presidential election results for Nutley
| Year | Republican | | Democratic | | Third party(ies) | |
| Year | No. | % | No. | % | No. | % |
|---|---|---|---|---|---|---|
| 2024 | 8,180 | 52.58% | 7,201 | 46.29% | 176 | 1.13% |
| 2020 | 8,052 | 47.79% | 8,633 | 51.24% | 164 | 0.97% |
| 2016 | 7,061 | 49.95% | 6,634 | 46.93% | 441 | 3.12% |
| 2012 | 6,273 | 48.52% | 6,507 | 50.33% | 148 | 1.14% |
| 2008 | 7,325 | 52.84% | 6,374 | 45.98% | 163 | 1.18% |
| 2004 | 7,579 | 54.98% | 6,099 | 44.25% | 106 | 0.77% |

In the 2013 gubernatorial election, Republican Chris Christie received 57.4% of the vote (4,497 cast), ahead of Democrat Barbara Buono with 41.3% (3,234 votes), and other candidates with 1.3% (100 votes), among the 7,950 ballots cast by the township's 19,559 registered voters (119 ballots were spoiled), for a turnout of 40.6%. In the 2009 gubernatorial election, Republican Chris Christie received 52.9% of the vote (4,684 ballots cast), ahead of Democrat Jon Corzine with 38.6% (3,416 votes), Independent Chris Daggett with 6.8% (601 votes) and other candidates with 1.0% (92 votes), among the 8,859 ballots cast by the township's 18,793 registered voters, yielding a 47.1% turnout.

United States Senate election results for Nutley1
| Year | Republican | | Democratic | | Third party(ies) | |
| Year | No. | % | No. | % | No. | % |
|---|---|---|---|---|---|---|
| 2024 | 7,073 | 48.58% | 7,081 | 48.64% | 404 | 2.78% |
| 2018 | 5,036 | 48.43% | 5,025 | 48.33% | 337 | 3.24% |
| 2012 | 4,804 | 44.37% | 5,714 | 52.78% | 308 | 2.85% |
| 2006 | 3,846 | 49.70% | 3,740 | 48.33% | 152 | 1.96% |

United States Senate election results for Nutley2
| Year | Republican | | Democratic | | Third party(ies) | |
| Year | No. | % | No. | % | No. | % |
|---|---|---|---|---|---|---|
| 2020 | 7,215 | 45.46% | 8,440 | 53.18% | 217 | 1.37% |
| 2014 | 2,577 | 46.74% | 2,847 | 51.63% | 90 | 1.63% |
| 2013 | 2,318 | 49.28% | 2,340 | 49.74% | 46 | 0.98% |
| 2008 | 5,405 | 47.50% | 5,740 | 50.44% | 234 | 2.06% |

== Education ==
The Nutley Public Schools serve students in pre-kindergarten through twelfth grade. As of the 2021–22 school year, the district, comprised of seven schools, had an enrollment of 4,034 students and 328.6 classroom teachers (on an FTE basis), for a student–teacher ratio of 12.3:1. Schools in the district (with 2021–22 enrollment data from the National Center for Education Statistics) are Lincoln School with 448 students in grades K-6, Radcliffe School with 346 students in grades K-6, Spring Garden School with 439 students in grades PreK-6, Washington School with 484 students in grades K-6, Yantacaw School with 480 students in grades K-6, John H. Walker Middle School with 618 students in grades 7-8 and Nutley High School with 1,163 students in grades 9-12.

The Nutley Public Schools offer a wide variety of programs in their curriculum that includes Advanced Placement (AP) courses, STEM programs, and a number of arts programs. Nutley also offers a number of extracurricular activities including competitive sports teams, art and theater programs, and student clubs.

Nutley also provides the opportunity for a private education such as Good Shepherd Academy, a Catholic school that offers education from kindergarten to eighth grade. It even offers a pre kindergarten program. It first opened its doors in 1951 and the first class graduated in 1955.

== Transportation ==
=== Roads and highways ===
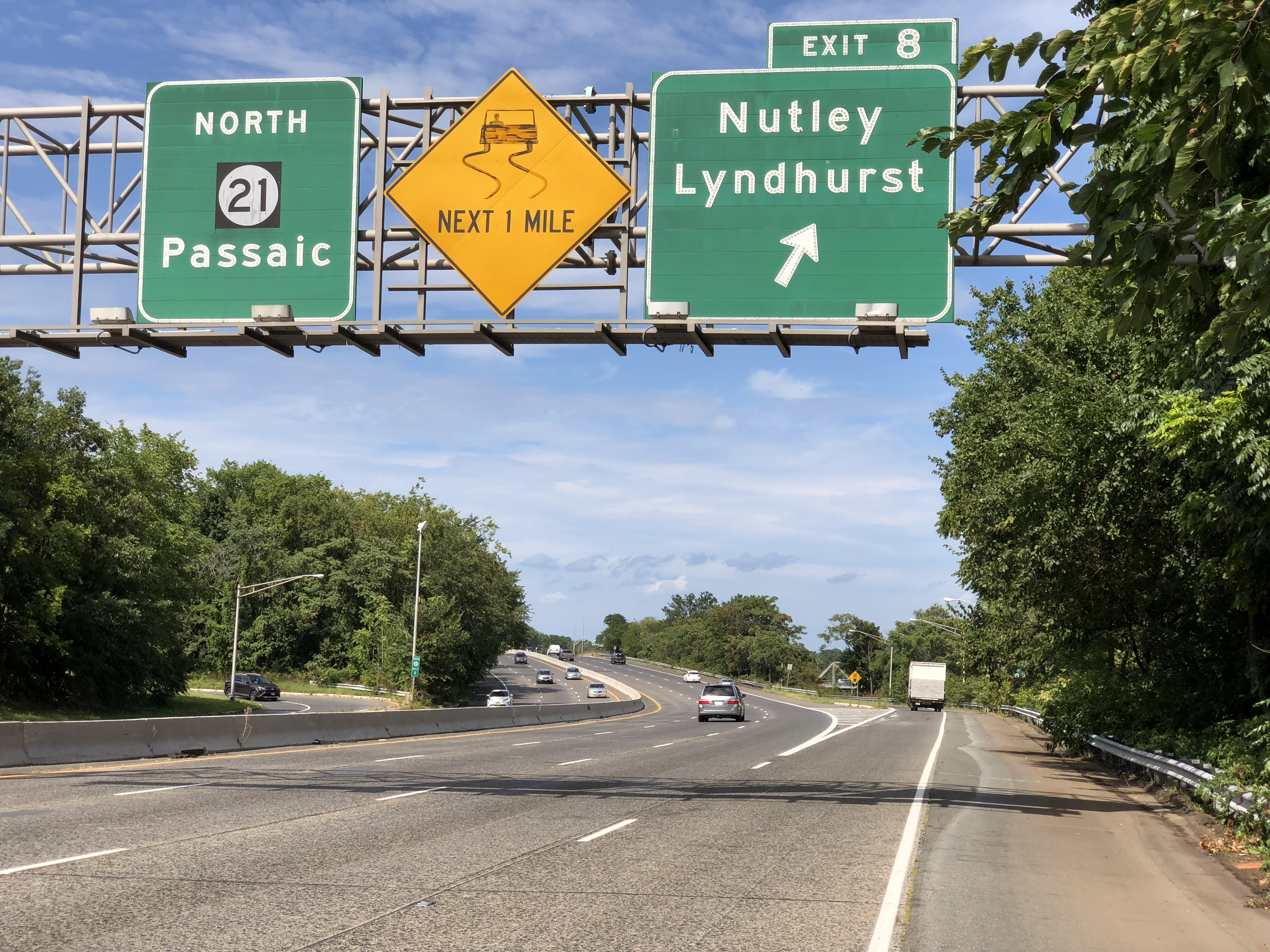
View north along Route 21 in Nutley

As of May 2010, the township had a total of 67.94 miles (109.34 km) of roadways, of which 57.00 miles (91.73 km) were maintained by the municipality, 7.71 miles (12.41 km) by Essex County, 2.45 miles (3.94 km) by the New Jersey Department of Transportation and 0.78 miles (1.26 km) by the New Jersey Turnpike Authority.

The Garden State Parkway clips the southwest corner of the township, entering in the south from Bloomfield before reentering Bloomfield in the north. Route 7 runs through the north of Nutley at its border with Clifton in Passaic County to its border with Belleville, using segments of Cathedral Avenue, Kingsland Street and Washington Avenue; part of the route on Kingsland Street dips into Clifton and then back into Nutley. Route 21 follows the township's eastern border between Clifton and Belleville.

=== Public transportation ===
NJ Transit provides bus service between the township and the Port Authority Bus Terminal in Midtown Manhattan on the 192 route, to Newark on the 13, 27, 72 and 74 routes, with local service on the 709 route.

Until 1966, the Newark Branch of the Erie-Lackawanna Railroad served the township with stations at Walnut Street, Highfield Street and at Franklin Avenue. The Newark Branch tracks are now used for freight only, operated by Norfolk Southern.

== Operation Nutley Cares ==
After Hurricane Katrina devastated the central gulf coast region on August 29, 2005, Mayor Joanne Cocchiola and Commissioner Carmen A. Orechio reached out to local residents who wanted to help victims of the devastation, and formed the Operation Nutley Cares Committee. A decision was made to adopt Bay St. Louis, Mississippi, as a sister city, Bay St. Louis, population 8,500, which sits just northeast of New Orleans, and had at least 60% of the community completely destroyed by Katrina and another 20% condemned. Monetary donations are still being accepted to help fund efforts to assist Bay St. Louis.

== Notable people ==
- Alaa Abdelnaby (born 1968), former NBA basketball player
- Dorothy Allison (1924–1999), psychic
- Edith "Big Edie" Ewing Bouvier Beale (1895–1977), socialite, amateur singer and aunt of former U.S. First Lady Jacqueline Kennedy Onassis; featured along with her daughter, also named Edith "Little Edie" Bouvier Beale, in the 1975 documentary film Grey Gardens
- Julian Bigelow (1913–2003), pioneering computer engineer
- Phyllis Birkby (1932–1994), architect and feminist
- Julian "Bud" Blake (1918–2005), cartoonist (Tiger)
- Robert Blake (1933–2023), actor (Baretta)
- Carol Blazejowski, (born 1956), general manager of the WNBA's New York Liberty
- Ray Blum (1919–2000), speed skater who represented the United States at the 1948 Winter Olympics
- Anthony Bowens, professional wrestler signed to All Elite Wrestling
- Alan Branigan (born 1975, class of 1993), Ivorian-born professional soccer player
- Henry Cuyler Bunner (1855–1896), novelist
- Barbara Buono (born 1953), New Jersey State Senator who has represented the 18th Legislative District since 2002
- Jane Burgio (1922–2005), member of the New Jersey General Assembly who served as secretary of state of New Jersey
- Tina Cervasio (born 1974), sportscaster, best known for her work as the Boston Red Sox sideline reporter on NESN telecasts
- P. C. Chang (1892–1957), Chinese academic, philosopher, playwright, human rights activist, and diplomat
- Clams Casino (born 1987 as Mike Volpe), hip hop producer
- Rena DeAngelo (class of 1984), Emmy Award winning and Academy Award nominated set decorator for her work on the films Bridge of Spies and the 2021 remake of West Side Story
- David DiFrancesco (born 1949), photoscientist, inventor, cinematographer, and photographer
- Joseph N. DiVincenzo Jr. (born 1952), county executive of Essex County since 2003
- Doug Edert (born 2000), college basketball player for the Saint Peter's Peacocks of the Metro Atlantic Athletic Conference
- Gary T. Erbe (born 1944), self-taught oil painter, best known for his trompe-l'œils, who maintains his studio in Nutley
- Ken Eulo (born 1939), Eugene O'Neill Award-winning writer and bestselling author whose novels have collectively sold over 13 million copies worldwide
- Mary Sargant Florence (1857–1954), British painter of figure subjects, mural decorations in fresco and occasional landscapes in watercolour and pastel
- Philip Sargant Florence (1890–1982), economist
- Frank Fowler (1852–1910), painter
- Ron Fraser (1933–2013), "Wizard of College Baseball", Baseball coach at University of Miami
- Garry Furnari (born 1954), politician who served in the New Jersey Senate and in New Jersey Superior Court and was Mayor of Nutley from 1996 to 2003
- Paul Goldberger (born 1950), Pulitzer Prize winner and architecture critic for The New Yorker
- Frances Goodrich (1890–1984), dramatist and screenwriter, best known for her collaborations with her partner and husband Albert Hackett
- Lloyd Goodrich (1897–1987), art historian
- Al Haig (1922–1982), jazz pianist, best known as one of the pioneers of bebop
- Ben Hawkins (1944–2017), professional American football wide receiver who played in the NFL for the Philadelphia Eagles and Cleveland Browns, and for the Philadelphia Bell of the World Football League
- Christine E. Haycock (1924–2008), nurse and surgeon who served as a colonel in the United States Army Reserve and as a professor of surgery and Director of Emergency Services at the New Jersey Medical School
- Lloyd Huck (1922–2012), business executive, philanthropist and aviation enthusiast, who was chairman of pharmaceutical firms Merck & Co. and of Mutual Benefit Life Insurance Company
- John V. Kelly (1926–2009), served in the New Jersey General Assembly and elected as Mayor of Nutley in 1988
- Frank Kirkleski (1904–1980), football player who played in the early years of the National Football League
- Frank Lautenberg (1924–2013), United States senator
- Michael Lenson (1903–1971), painter and muralist
- Anne Steele Marsh (1901–1995), painter and printmaker whose watercolors, oil paintings and wood engravings were widely exhibited
- Frederick Dana Marsh (1872–1961), illustrator
- Reginald Marsh (1898–1954), painter
- Frank McDonald (born c. 1933), football player who played as an end for the Miami Hurricanes football team
- Abram Molarsky (1880–1955), Impressionist and Post-Impressionist painter best known for his landscapes
- Annie Oakley (1860–1926), sharpshooter
- Carl Orechio (1914–1991), politician who served in the New Jersey General Assembly from 1972 to 1982
- Carmen A. Orechio (1926–2018), President of the New Jersey Senate who spent 40 years as a commissioner in Nutley
- Carlo Jackie Paris (1926–2004), jazz singer and guitarist
- Andrew Pecora (born 1957), hematologist and oncologist who has been involved in the research on the use of stem cells and oncolytic viruses to treat diseases, including cancer
- William Pène du Bois (1916–1993), author, artist
- Stephen Petronio (born 1956), choreographer
- Eileen Poiani, mathematician who was the first female mathematics instructor at Saint Peter's University
- Mark Radice, singer, musician, and producer
- Kevin J. Ryan (born 1969), former member of the New Jersey General Assembly
- Frederick Scalera (born 1958), politician who served in the New Jersey General Assembly from 2003 to 2011 and serves on the Board of Education of the Nutley Public Schools
- Connie Siskowski, activist for young people who are caring for ill, disabled, or aging family members
- Raphael Sonenshein (born 1949), executive director of the Los Angeles Charter Reform Commission and chairman of the political science department at California State University, Fullerton
- Frederic Dorr Steele (1873–1944), illustrator
- Martha Stewart (born 1941 as Martha Helen Kostyra), author, businesswoman, magazine publisher and television personality
- Frank R. Stockton (1834–1902), writer, best known for his short story "The Lady or the Tiger?"
- Alix Strachey (1892–1973), psychoanalyst, born Alix Sargant-Florence, translated Sigmund Freud's works into English
- Chief Jay Strongbow (ring name of Luke Joseph Scarpa, 1928–2012), professional wrestler and WWE Hall of Famer
- Sharon Van Etten (born 1981), singer-songwriter
- Geerat J. Vermeij (born 1946), professor of geology at the University of California, Davis
- Frank Vincent (1937–2017), actor who played prominent roles in the HBO series The Sopranos and in several films for director Martin Scorsese: Raging Bull (1980), Goodfellas (1990) and Casino (1995)
- Nick Zano (born 1978), actor
- Eli Zaret (born 1950), sports broadcaster and journalist

== Cultural references ==
- Aerosmith played at the Nutley prom in the 1960s.
- Antiwar activist and Quaker Carl Hinke became the last American arrested for the Vietnam War draft Opposition to the Vietnam War on December 12, 1976. He had moved to Canada due to his pacifist convictions after being offered a one-way ticket to North Vietnam by Nutley's American Legion and Veterans of Foreign Wars chapters. Hinke was pardoned by Jimmy Carter on January 21, 1977, in his first official act as president.
- Weird NJ runs regular features on past and present Nutley destinations such as Franklin Avenue beat coffee house, Angelo Nardone's Villa Capri, which the town council tried to close for decades, and various Nutley "old man" bars such as the Old Canal Inn. Nutley was also used as a shooting location for the 1999 film Weird N.J.
- The courtroom in NBC's television show Ed was an exact replica of Nutley's municipal courtroom, and various locations in the township were used during filming, including the outside of the Public Safety building.
- The short-lived Fox television show Quintuplets was set in Nutley.
- ECW wrestler Balls Mahoney was billed as being from Nutley.
- On Saturday Night Live, aired January 12, 2001, episode hosted by Derek Jeter. Derek Jeter stars in a fake commercial for Derek Jeter's Taco Hole, which is located in Nutley, NJ. Premise: Derek Jeter is a great chef and during the off-season he sells tacos. Lyrics sung to The Beach Boys' Kokomo song: "... Just off Route 3, There's a place called Nutley, New Jersey, If good Mexican food is your goal, There's just one place you should go, Derek Jeter's Taco Hole".
- In What We Do in the Shadows Season 3, Episode 6 "The Escape," a home in Nutley, NJ becomes the residence for The Sire, The Baron, and a hellhound.
- In Gutenberg! The Musical!, main characters Bud Davenport and Doug Simon are from Nutley, NJ
