= Muckenhoupt weights =

In mathematics, the class of Muckenhoupt weights A_{p} consists of those weights ω for which the Hardy–Littlewood maximal operator is bounded on L^{p}(dω). Specifically, we consider functions f on R^{n} and their associated maximal functions M( f ) defined as

$$M(f)(x) = \sup_{r>0} \frac{1}{r^n} \int_{B_r(x)} |f|,$$

where B_{r}(x) is the ball in R^{n} with radius r and center at x. Let 1 ≤ p < ∞, we wish to characterise the functions ω : R^{n} → [0, ∞) for which we have a bound

$$\int |M(f)(x)|^p \, \omega(x) dx \leq C \int |f|^p \, \omega(x)\, dx,$$

where C depends only on p and ω. This was first done by Benjamin Muckenhoupt.

== Definition ==
For a fixed 1 < p < ∞, we say that a weight ω : R^{n} → [0, ∞) belongs to A_{p} if ω is locally integrable and there is a constant C such that, for all balls B in R^{n}, we have

$$\left(\frac{1}{|B|} \int_B \omega(x) \, dx \right)\left(\frac{1}{|B|} \int_B \omega(x)^{-\frac{q}{p}} \, dx \right)^\frac{p}{q} \leq C < \infty,$$

where |B| is the Lebesgue measure of B, and q is a real number such that: 1/p + 1/q = 1.

We say ω : R^{n} → [0, ∞) belongs to A_{1} if there exists some C such that

$$\frac{1}{|B|} \int_B \omega(y) \, dy \leq C\omega(x),$$

for almost every x ∈ B and all balls B.

== Equivalent characterizations ==
This following result is a fundamental result in the study of Muckenhoupt weights.

Theorem. Let 1 < p < ∞. A weight ω is in A_{p} if and only if any one of the following hold.

(a) The Hardy–Littlewood maximal function is bounded on L^{p}(ω(x)dx), that is

$$\int |M(f)(x)|^p \, \omega(x)\, dx \leq C \int |f|^p \, \omega(x)\, dx,$$

for some C which only depends on p and the constant A in the above definition.

(b) There is a constant c such that for any locally integrable function f on R^{n}, and all balls B:

$$(f_B)^p \leq \frac{c}{\omega(B)} \int_B f(x)^p \, \omega(x)\,dx,$$

where:

$$f_B = \frac{1}{|B|}\int_B f, \qquad \omega(B) = \int_B \omega(x)\,dx.$$

Equivalently:

Theorem. Let 1 < p < ∞, then w = e^{φ} ∈ A_{p} if and only if both of the following hold:

$$\sup_{B}\frac{1}{|B|}\int_{B}e^{\varphi-\varphi_B}dx<\infty$$
$$\sup_{B}\frac{1}{|B|}\int_{B}e^{-\frac{\varphi-\varphi_B}{p-1}}dx<\infty.$$

This equivalence can be verified by using Jensen's Inequality.

== Reverse Hölder inequalities and A_{∞} ==
The main tool in the proof of the above equivalence is the following result. The following statements are equivalent

1. ω ∈ A_{p} for some 1 ≤ p < ∞.
2. There exist 0 < δ, γ < 1 such that for all balls B and subsets E ⊂ B, |E| ≤ γ |B| implies ω(E) ≤ δ ω(B).
3. There exist 1 < q and c (both depending on ω) such that for all balls B we have:

$$\frac{1}{|B|} \int_{B} \omega^q \leq \left(\frac{c}{|B|} \int_{B} \omega \right)^q.$$

We call the inequality in the third formulation a reverse Hölder inequality as the reverse inequality follows for any non-negative function directly from Hölder's inequality. If any of the three equivalent conditions above hold we say ω belongs to A_{∞}.

== Weights and BMO ==
The definition of an A_{p} weight and the reverse Hölder inequality indicate that such a weight cannot degenerate or grow too quickly. This property can be phrased equivalently in terms of how much the logarithm of the weight oscillates:

(a) If w ∈ A_{p}, (p ≥ 1), then log(w) ∈ BMO (i.e. log(w) has bounded mean oscillation).

(b) If f ∈ BMO, then for sufficiently small δ > 0, we have e^{δf} ∈ A_{p} for some p ≥ 1.

This equivalence can be established by using the exponential characterization of weights above, Jensen's inequality, and the John–Nirenberg inequality.

Note that the smallness assumption on δ > 0 in part (b) is necessary for the result to be true, as −log|x| ∈ BMO, but:

$$e^{-\log|x|}=\frac{1}{e^{\log|x|}} = \frac{1}{|x|}$$

is not in any A_{p} (here n=1).

== Further properties ==
Here we list a few miscellaneous properties about weights, some of which can be verified from using the definitions, others are nontrivial results:

$$A_1 \subseteq A_p \subseteq A_\infty, \qquad 1\leq p\leq\infty.$$

$$A_\infty = \bigcup_{p<\infty}A_p.$$

If w ∈ A_{p}, then w dx defines a doubling measure: for any ball B, if 2B is the ball of twice the radius, then w(2B) ≤ Cw(B) where C > 1 is a constant depending on w.

If w ∈ A_{p}, then there is δ > 1 such that w^{δ} ∈ A_{p}.

If w ∈ A_{∞}, then there is δ > 0 and weights $w_1,w_2\in A_1$ such that $w=w_1 w_2^{-\delta}$.

== Boundedness of singular integrals ==
It is not only the Hardy–Littlewood maximal operator that is bounded on these weighted L^{p} spaces. In fact, any Calderón-Zygmund singular integral operator is also bounded on these spaces. Let us describe a simpler version of this here. Suppose we have an operator T which is bounded on L^{2}(dx), so we have

$$\forall f \in C^{\infty}_c : \qquad \|T(f)\|_{L^2} \leq C\|f\|_{L^2}.$$

Suppose also that we can realise T as convolution against a kernel K in the following sense: if f , g are smooth with disjoint support, then:

$$\int g(x) T(f)(x) \, dx = \iint g(x) K(x-y) f(y) \, dy\,dx.$$

Finally we assume a size and smoothness condition on the kernel K:

$$\forall x \neq 0, \forall |\alpha| \leq 1 : \qquad \left |\partial^{\alpha} K \right | \leq C |x|^{-n-\alpha}.$$

Then, for each 1 < p < ∞ and ω ∈ A_{p}, T is a bounded operator on L^{p}(ω(x)dx). That is, we have the estimate

$$\int |T(f)(x)|^p \, \omega(x)\,dx \leq C \int |f(x)|^p \, \omega(x)\, dx,$$

for all f for which the right-hand side is finite.

=== A converse result ===
If, in addition to the three conditions above, we assume the non-degeneracy condition on the kernel K: For a fixed unit vector u_{0}

$$|K(x)| \geq a |x|^{-n}$$

whenever $x = t \dot u_0$ with −∞ < t < ∞, then we have a converse. If we know

$$\int |T(f)(x)|^p \, \omega(x)\,dx \leq C \int |f(x)|^p \, \omega(x)\, dx,$$

for some fixed 1 < p < ∞ and some ω, then ω ∈ A_{p}.

== Weights and quasiconformal mappings ==
For K > 1, a K-quasiconformal mapping is a homeomorphism f : R^{n} →R^{n} such that

$$f\in W^{1,2}_{loc}(\mathbf{R}^n), \quad \text{ and } \quad \frac{\|Df(x)\|^n}{J(f,x)}\leq K,$$

where Df (x) is the derivative of f at x and J( f , x) = det(Df (x)) is the Jacobian.

A theorem of Gehring states that for all K-quasiconformal functions f : R^{n} →R^{n}, we have J( f , x) ∈ A_{p}, where p depends on K.

== Harmonic measure ==
If you have a simply connected domain Ω ⊆ C, we say its boundary curve Γ = ∂Ω is K-chord-arc if for any two points z, w in Γ there is a curve γ ⊆ Γ connecting z and w whose length is no more than K|z − w|. For a domain with such a boundary and for any z_{0} in Ω, the harmonic measure w( ⋅ ) = w(z_{0}, Ω, ⋅) is absolutely continuous with respect to one-dimensional Hausdorff measure and its Radon–Nikodym derivative is in A_{∞}. (Note that in this case, one needs to adapt the definition of weights to the case where the underlying measure is one-dimensional Hausdorff measure).
