= Michael Lenson =

American painter (1903–1971)

Michael Lenson (February 21, 1903 – June 9, 1971) was an American realist painter. Who Was Who in American Art called him "New Jersey's most important muralist." He is valued for his skill as a draftsman and the technique he achieved by close study of the Old Masters.

== Biography ==
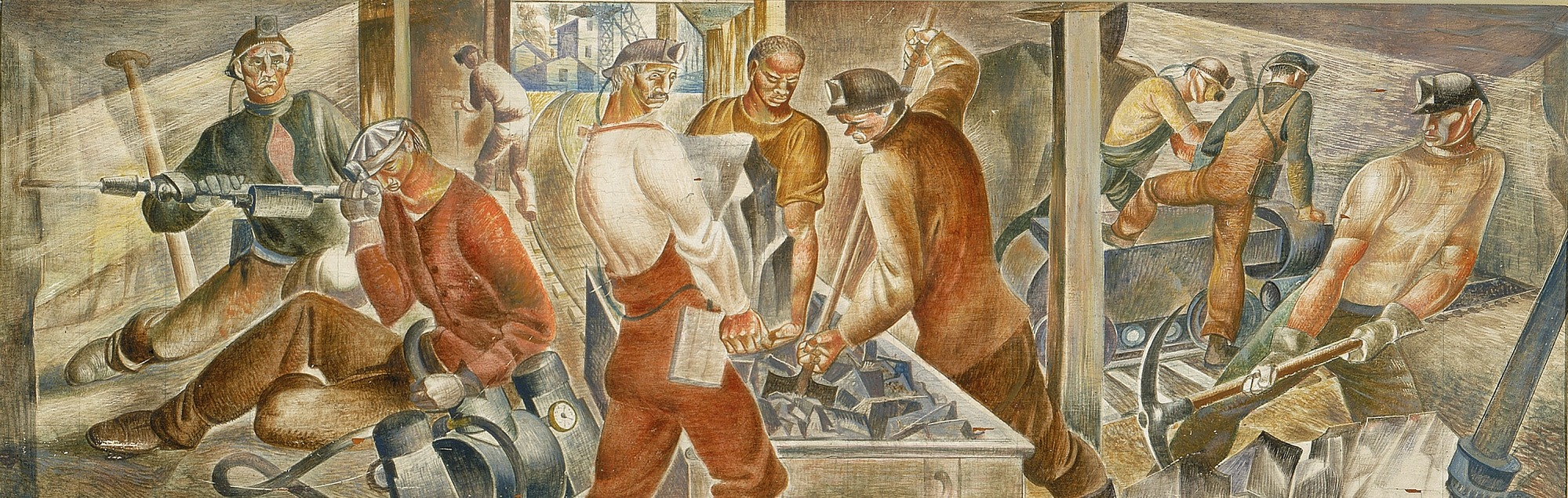
Study for Mining (1942), Lenson's mural for the post office in Mount Hope, West Virginia, commissioned by the Section of Painting and Sculpture

Michael Lenson was born as Michael Levenson in Galich, Russia, on February 21, 1903, and emigrated to the United States in 1911. He studied at the National Academy of Design, where he won the $10,000 Chalonier Paris Prize in 1928. This supported four years of additional studies in Europe: at the Slade School of Art in London, the Academie des Beaux Arts in Paris, and in the Netherlands.

He returned from Europe to face an inhospitable art market during the Great Depression. He told an interviewer years later: "I was no more a conquering hero, I came back to nothing." He applied for work with the New York unit of the Works Progress Administration's Federal Art Project, but was rejected because he exceeded the income requirement since one of his brothers was a doctor and the family owned a dry cleaning business. In 1936 he reapplied successfully in New Jersey by not admitting to any family sources of support. He rose to become assistant state supervisor of mural projects for the WPA in New Jersey. He completed several major murals and he supervised a dozen more by other artists. He stayed with the WPA until the program ended in 1943.

His surviving WPA murals, all in Newark, include History of the Enlightenment of Man at Weequahic High School; History of Newark in the council chambers at Newark City Hall; and The Four Freedoms at the Fourteenth Avenue School. Three others were destroyed: The History of New Jersey, a 16-by-75-foot mural at the Essex Mountain Sanatorium in Verona, was destroyed during renovations; murals for the New Jersey Pavilion of the 1939 World's Fair and for the Charlton Street School in Newark were lost to demolition.

The Treasury Department's Section of Painting and Sculpture commissioned Lenson to create a mural titled Mining (1942) for the United States post office in Mount Hope, West Virginia.

In 1941 he bought a home in Nutley, New Jersey, and in 1945 he married June Rollar.

Lenson exhibited at several New York City galleries, including Bonestell Gallery in 1947, Kende Gallery in 1951, and Cober Gallery in 1962. A New York Times review said:

The wittiest paintings of the week are those by Michael Lenson at the Kende Gallery. He paints with some sort of synthetic resins and lacquer and the resulting surfaces, not pleasing to the eye, are as hard and unyielding as the whip-like profilings that imprison his mannered figures. A good deal of imagination goes into these figures, which move from reality to fantasy with the professional ease of ballet dancers.

He painted in oil after 1950, adapting his earlier surrealist elements to the socialist realism of his younger years. "Where Are We Now?" (1955) protested against nuclear proliferation in a way both emotional and political. One critic described his later works as "sometimes difficult to read because they're so visually intricate" but are still perfect representatives of the politically engaged art of the Cold War years.

He painted and exhibited extensively until his death in 1971.

Lenson wrote a weekly column for the Newark Sunday News, "The Realm of Art," from 1956 to 1971. It made him, according to art historian William Gerdts, "New Jersey's most distinguished art critic". He taught at the Rutgers Extension School and Montclair Art Museum, which acquired many of his works upon his death. He testified before a government committee in 1969 to urge increased funding for public libraries in a room decorated with his own murals.

The Montclair Art Museum mounted a retrospective of his career in 1970. Still a resident of Nutley, Lenson died in Orange, New Jersey, on June 9, 1971, at the age of 68.

His works are in the collections of the RISD Museum, the Maier Museum of Art, the Johnson Museum at Cornell, the Newark Museum, the Montclair Art Museum, the Wolfsonian Collection, and many others.

The Butler Institute of American Art in Ohio presented a one-man retrospective exhibition of paintings and drawings by Lenson, "Time, Place and Substance", in 2012–2013.

One of his brothers was the humorist Sam Levenson. His son is David Lenson, a professor in the Comparative Literature department at the University of Massachusetts Amherst and the author of On Drugs.
