= Vreeland Homestead =

Historic house in New Jersey, United States

- U.S. National Register of Historic Places
- New Jersey Register of Historic Places
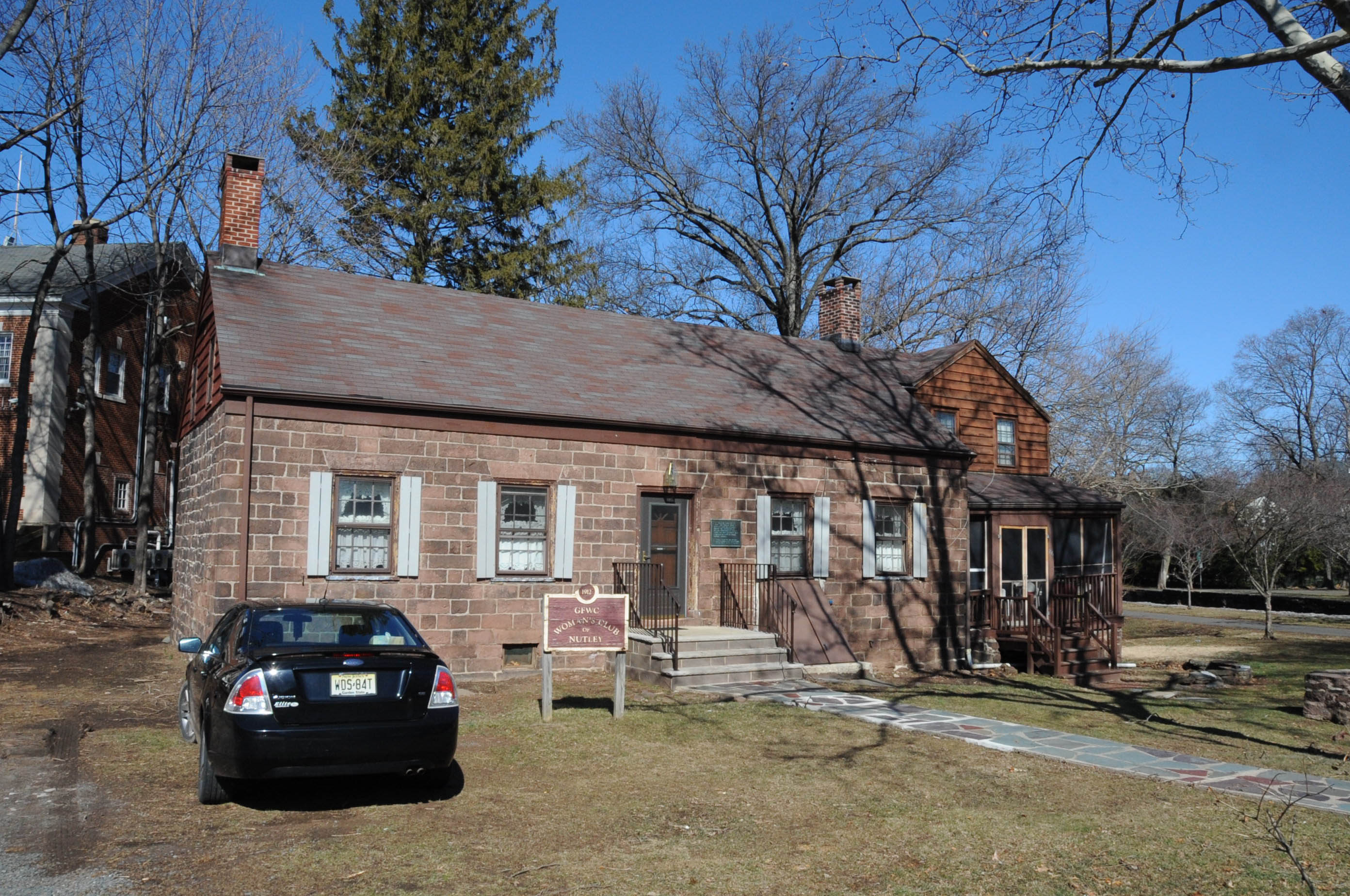

- Location within Essex County, New Jersey Location within New Jersey Location within the United States
- Location: 216 Chestnut Street, Nutley, New Jersey
- Coordinates: 40°49′7″N 74°9′28″W
- Built: c. 1751
- Architectural style: Colonial, Dutch Colonial
- NRHP reference No.: 94001217
- NJRHP No.: 1350

Significant dates
- Added to NRHP: October 14, 1994
- Designated NJRHP: March 14, 1994

The Vreeland Homestead is a historic stone house located at 216 Chestnut Street in the township of Nutley in Essex County, New Jersey, United States. It was documented by the Historic American Buildings Survey (HABS) program in 1936. The house was added to the National Register of Historic Places on October 14, 1994, for its significance in architecture. It was owned by the Woman's Club of Nutley until 2012, when the township bought the property. It is now operated by the Nutley Historical Society.

== History and description ==
Previously thought to have been built in 1702 for Bastien van Giesen by Jacob Vreeland, the house is now thought to have been built after his death in 1751 for his son, Hendrick van Giesen. The property later passed to his brother, Abraham van Giesen, who sold it to Captain Abraham Speer in 1783. He soon sold it to his brother-in-law John M. Vreeland. It remained in the Vreeland family until 1909. In 1912, it was leased to the Woman's Club of Nutley, who then purchased the property in 1923. It was acquired by the township in 2012 and is now operated by the Nutley Historical Society.

The oldest section of the house was built of brownstone from a nearby quarry. In the 1800s, a two-story frame wing was added.

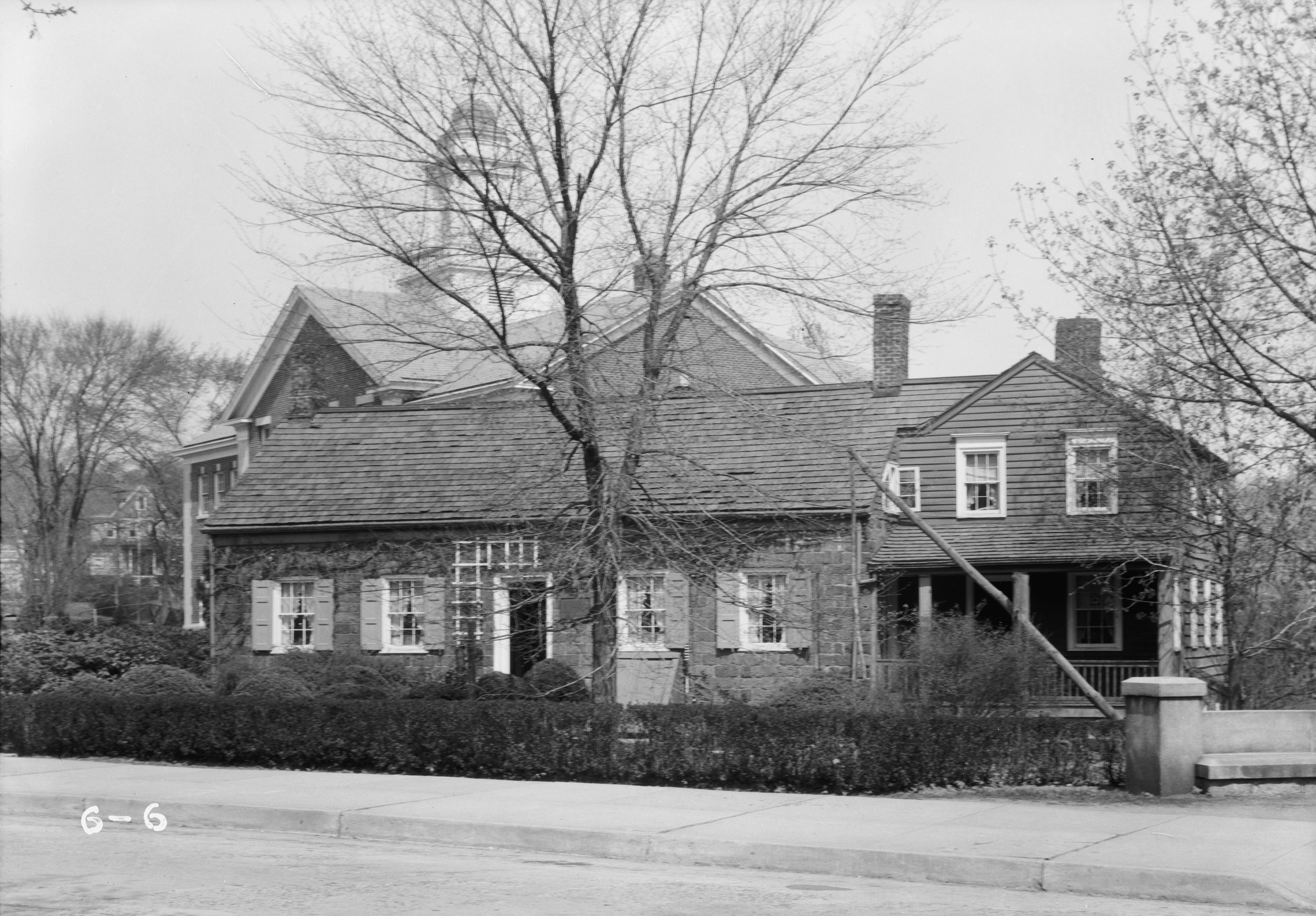
HABS photo from 1936

== See also ==
- Van Riper House
- List of the oldest buildings in New Jersey
- National Register of Historic Places listings in Essex County, New Jersey
- Kingsland Manor
