= Alan Venook =

American physician

Alan P. Venook is an American physician, currently the Shorenstein Associate Director for Program Development, Professor and Madden Family Distinguished Professor at Helen Diller Comprehensive Cancer Center, University of California, San Francisco.
