= Kingsland Manor =

Historic house in New Jersey, United States

- U.S. National Register of Historic Places
- New Jersey Register of Historic Places
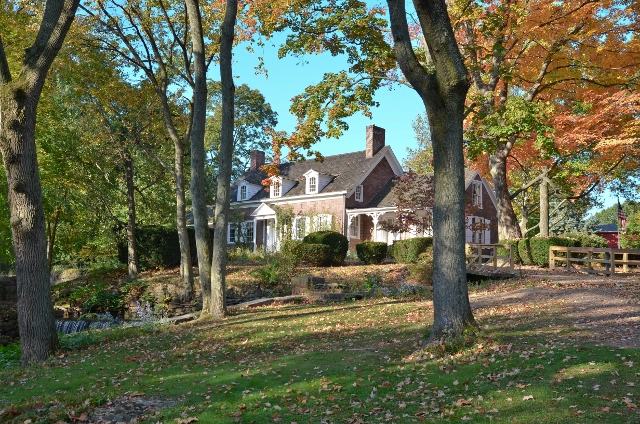

- Location within Essex County, New Jersey Location within New Jersey Location within the United States
- Location: 3 Kingsland Street, Nutley, New Jersey
- Coordinates: 40°49′35″N 74°8′35″W
- Built: 1790
- Architectural style: Dutch Colonial
- NRHP reference No.: 78001762
- NJRHP No.: 1349

Significant dates
- Added to NRHP: March 24, 1978
- Designated NJRHP: January 9, 1978

The Kingsland Manor is a Dutch Colonial home with Federal-style elements located at 3 Kingsland Street in Nutley, Essex County, New Jersey, United States. The house was added to the National Register of Historic Places on March 24, 1978, for its significance in architecture, exploration/settlement, industry, and social history.

== History of the Kingsland Manor ==
The Kingsland Manor was built in about 1768 by John Walls, who owned a nearby lumber mill, for his son James. The house was intended as a farmhouse for James and his wife Mary.

In 1787, Joseph Kingsland, a contractor living in New York City, was awarded a contract to install wooden curbing in the city. Joseph was the grandson of Isaac Kingsland, who had emigrated from Barbados to New Barbadoes (a portion of northeastern New Jersey) in 1668–1669. Joseph was raised in Isaac's home in what is currently Lyndhurst, across the Passaic River from where the lumber mill was located. To fulfill the contract, Joseph needed an ample supply of hardwood and a mill to cut it. He purchased the Walls farmhouse and the lumber mill in 1790 and spent the next six years working on the house, raising the ceilings and plastering the walls, to make the home suitable for his wife and children.

Joseph's oldest son, Joseph II, partnered with his brother-in-law, Peter Morris, in a paper-making business that used sawdust waste from the lumber mill. They also branched out into other businesses that included grinding wheat and corn in a gristmill and selling ice. Joseph II inherited the Kingsland Manor and associated properties when his father died in 1821. Joseph II's son, Joseph III, continued the family businesses until his death in 1899. Joseph III's sisters sold the property in 1909. The Kingsland family's direct involvement with the Kingsland Manor spanned three generations and three centuries. That period included a partnership with George La Monte to manufacture safety paper for use by banks, investment firms, and the federal government.

In 1909, a Chicago politician and lawyer named Dan McGinnity purchased the Kingsland Manor to use as a training site for pugilists. Dan partnered with Bob Fitzsimmons, a professional boxer who was the sport's first three-division world champion. “Diamond” Dan was married to Katherine Agnes and, they had a child, Bernard Charles. Bernard, nicknamed “Bus”, was educated in the Nutley School system and graduated from high school in 1919. In 1921, he became a constable in the third ward of Nutley. By 1927, he was a freelance cartoonist for the New York American newspaper. That same year, Bus opened a speakeasy in the basement of the Kingsland Manor and operated it until Prohibition ended. He then opened a private club that he called the Colonial Club. In December 1936, he lost his license after illegally serving alcohol to non-members who were also employees of the New Jersey Division of Alcohol and Beverage Control. He died at the age of 37 under murky circumstances: his body was found near a barn across from the Manor with a gun lying next to him. He had been shot in the head.

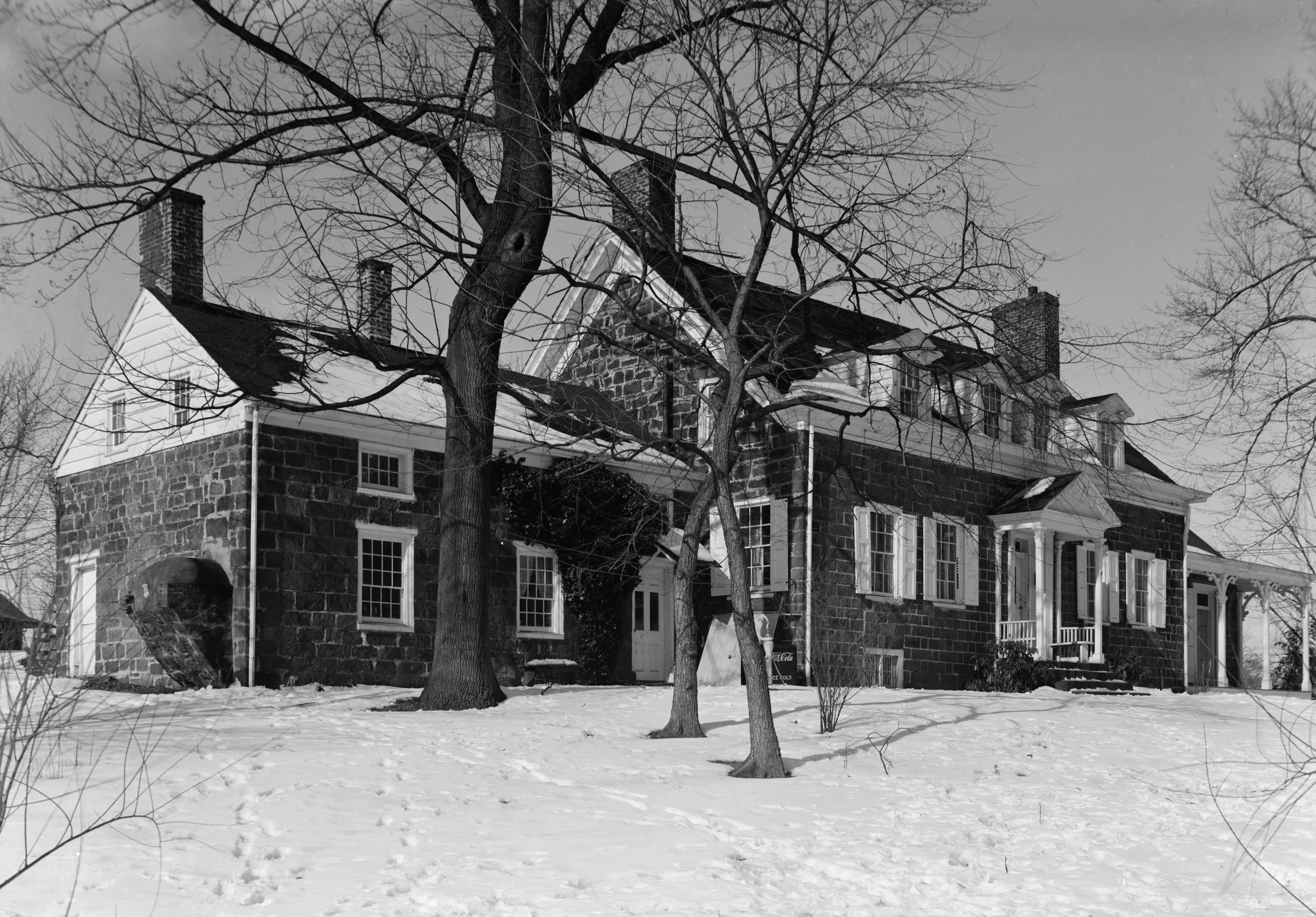
HABS photo from 1941

Katherine Agnes McGinnity ran the Kingsland Manor as the Nutley Private Hospital until 1938, when she lost the property to taxes. In 1939, Mr. and Mrs. Ralph Smith acquired the Manor in a sheriff's sale. Ralph was an air traffic controller at Newark Airport. In 1941, while the Smiths were living there, the Kingsland Manor was documented by the Historic American Buildings Survey (HABS) program.

In 1944, the Manor was purchased by International Telephone and Telegraph (ITT) and was the home of Vice President L. John Denny. Denny lived in the Manor until 1958, when the property was purchased by Norman and Doris Schepps. The Schepps sold many of the original furnishings from the home in their antiques store in Chatham, Massachusetts.

In 1971, the Schepps sold the Manor to a developer who approached the Nutley planning board with a proposal to subdivide the property and build four modern homes in its place. In recognition of the fact that the HABS program had found the Manor historically significant, the planning board turned down the proposal and chose to purchase the property with New Jersey Green Acres Funds. In 1974, the Historic Restoration Trust of Nutley was established as a partnership between the Friends of Kingsland Manor and the Parks and Recreation Commission of Nutley.

== Visiting the Kingsland Manor ==
The Kingsland Manor is open to the public for guided tours the third Sunday of each month (except in August) from 1:00 p.m. – 4:00 p.m. Private tours can be reserved. The house is also opened to the public for educational and fundraising events.

== Exhibits at the Kingsland Manor ==
The Kingsland Manor has nine rooms, each containing 18th and 19th century furniture, paintings, decorative objects, toys, and household items. Exhibits from the Roaring Twenties include items that belonged to Bus McGinnity and his wife, Lulu, and a newly restored speakeasy.

== See also ==
- Van Riper House
- Vreeland Homestead
- List of the oldest buildings in New Jersey
- National Register of Historic Places listings in Essex County, New Jersey
