= Van Riper House =

Historic building in New Jersey, United States

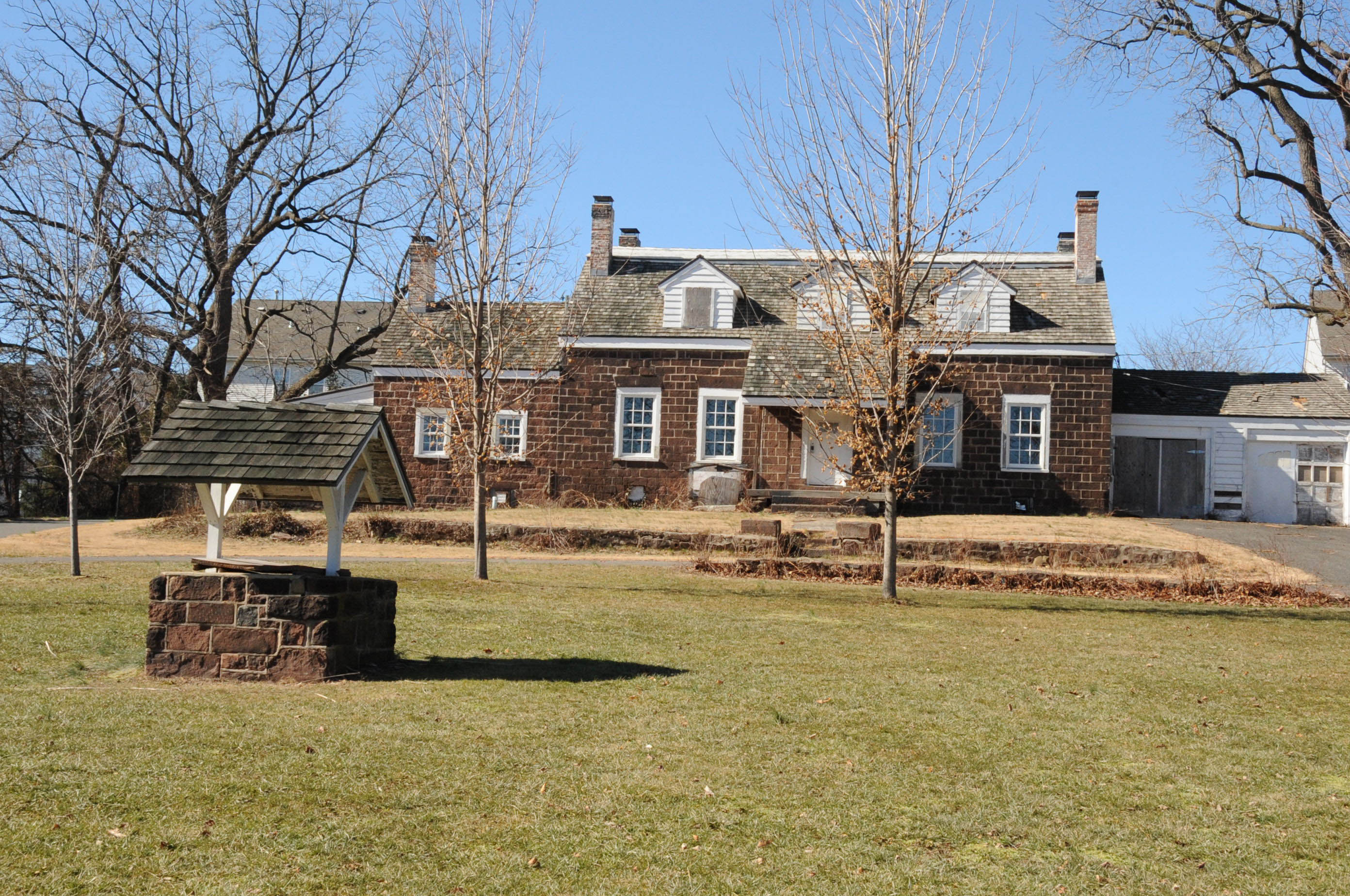
- Interactive map of the Van Riper House area

General information
- Location: Nutley, New Jersey, 491 River Road
- Coordinates: 40°49′19″N 74°08′10″W
- Completed: 1708
- Owner: Local
- Landlord: Van Riper House, Inc

The Van Riper House is a Bergen Dutch sandstone house located in Nutley, New Jersey, built in 1708. The building was owned in the 20th century by ITT Corporation and served as executives' residence and offices. In 2001, the building and 0.9 acres of land were transferred to the municipal government who then leased it to Van Riper House, Inc., a nonprofit corporation, for twenty years, with the intention that it would be restored and preserved.

== See also ==
- List of the oldest buildings in New Jersey
- National Register of Historic Places listings in Essex County, New Jersey
- Vreeland Homestead
- Kingsland Manor
