= Maurice Molarsky =

American painter

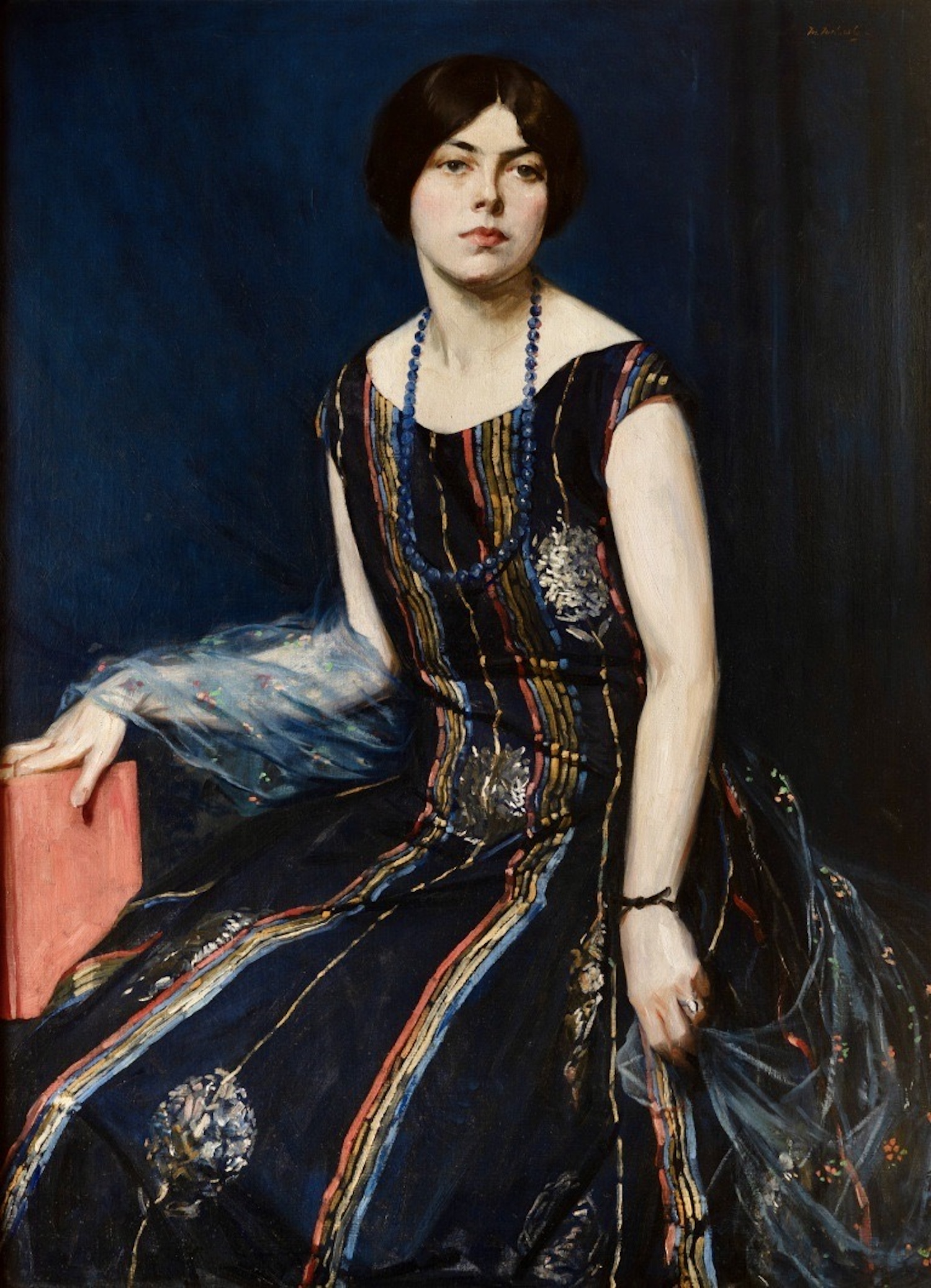
Portrait of a Young Woman Holding a Red Book, c. 1915 (Private collection)

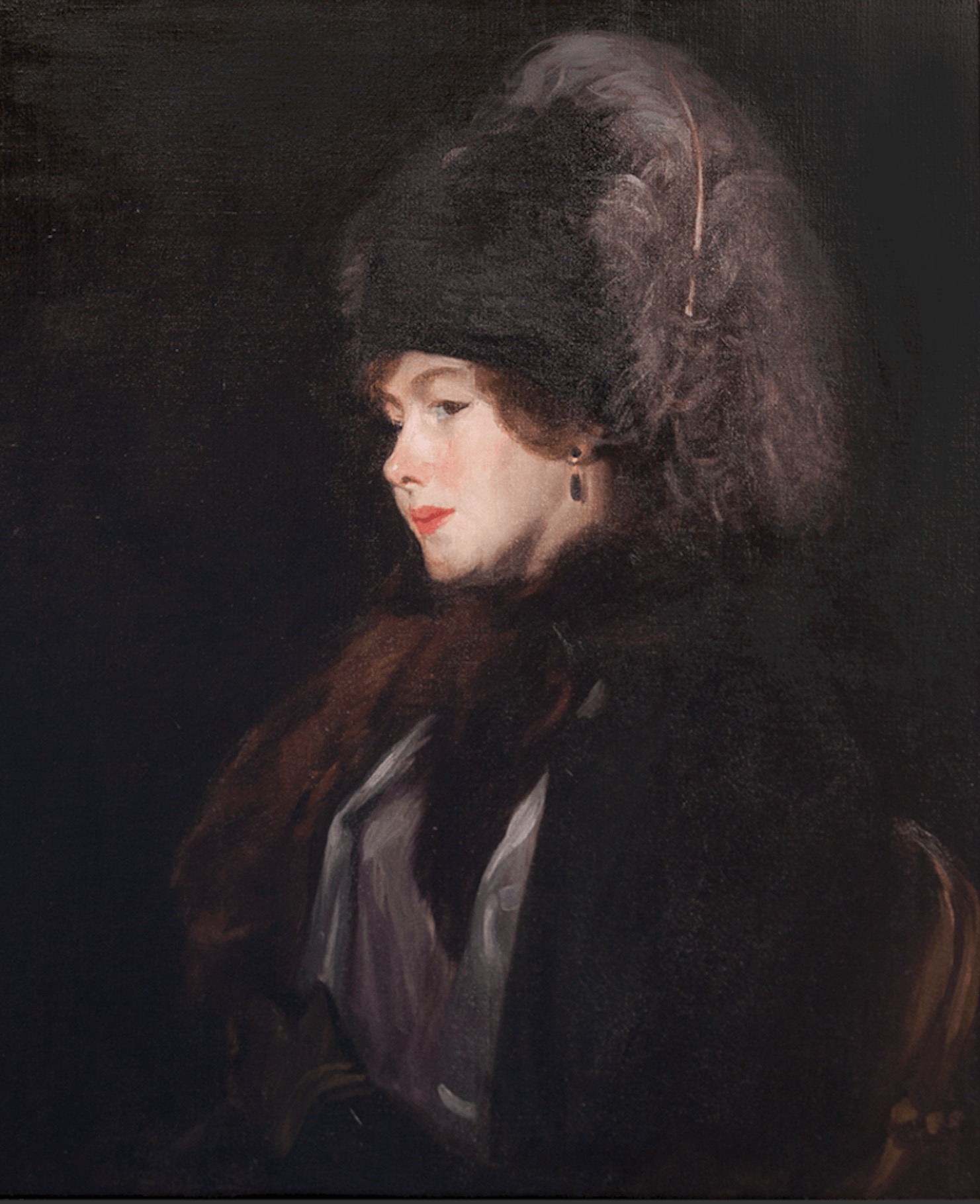
Portrait of a Young Beauty, c.1910 (Private collection)

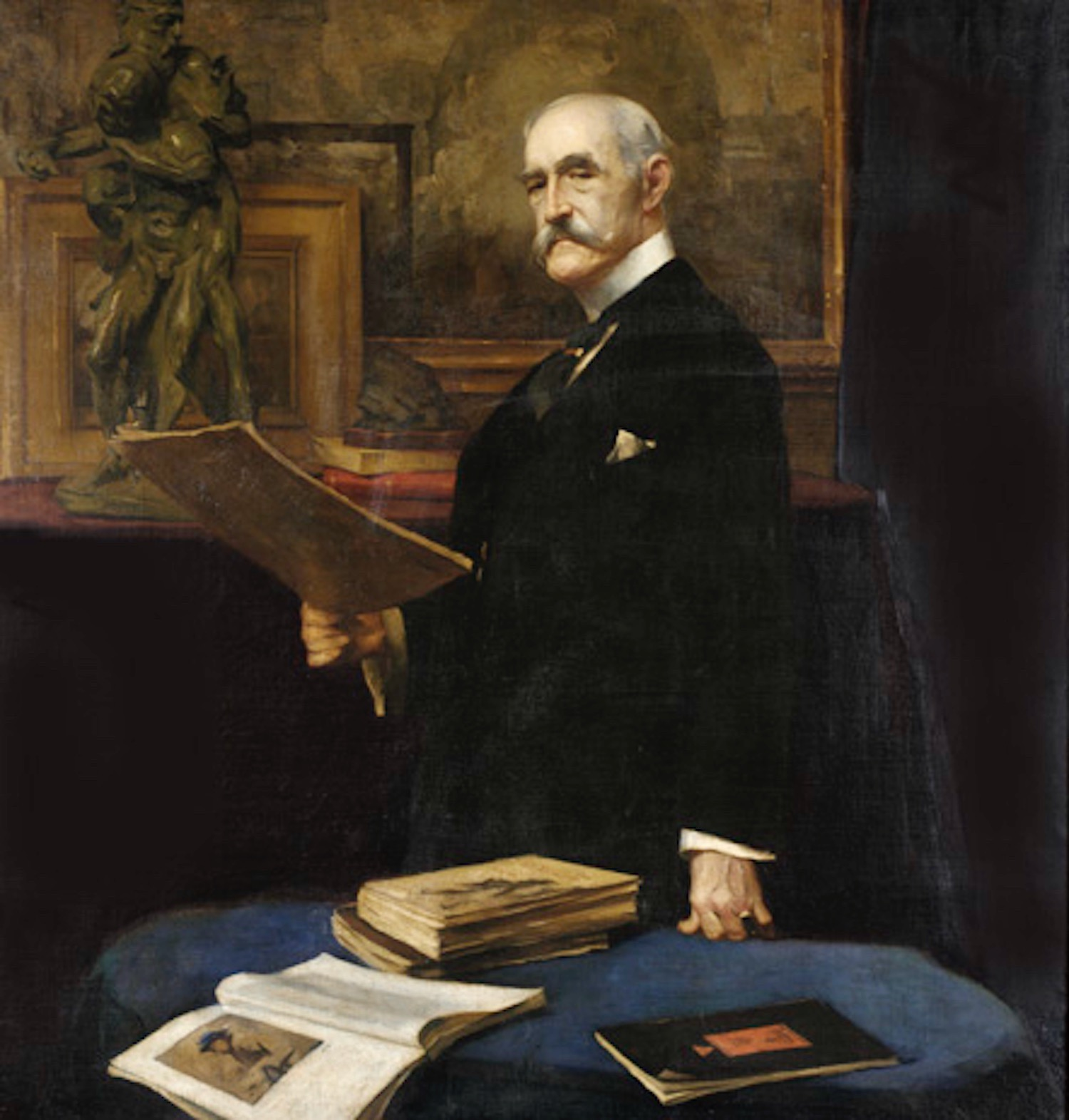
The Connoisseur, 1923 (Pennsylvania Academy of the Fine Arts)

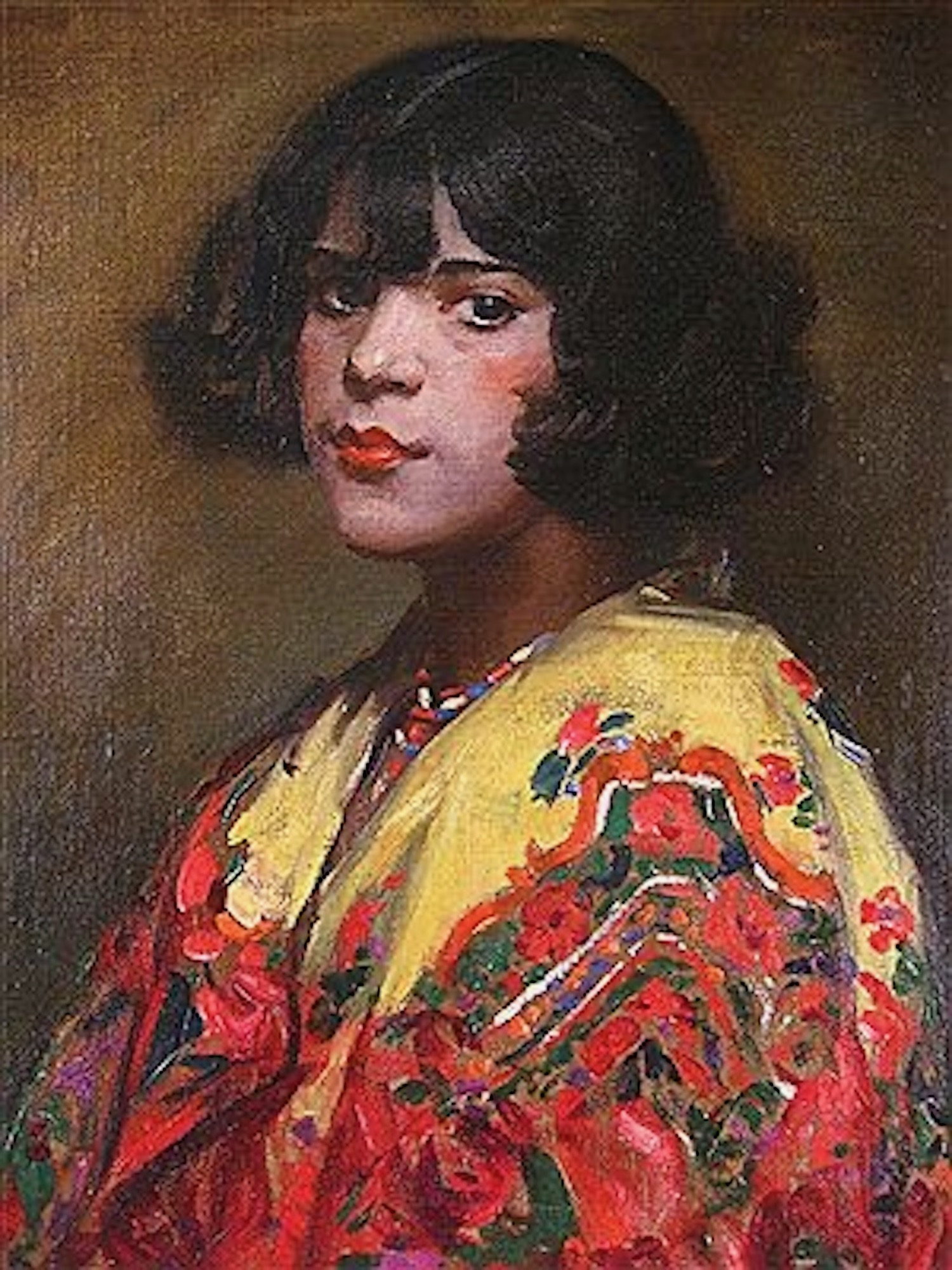
"Portrait of a Romany Girl" (The Yellow Shawl), c.1925 (Private collection)

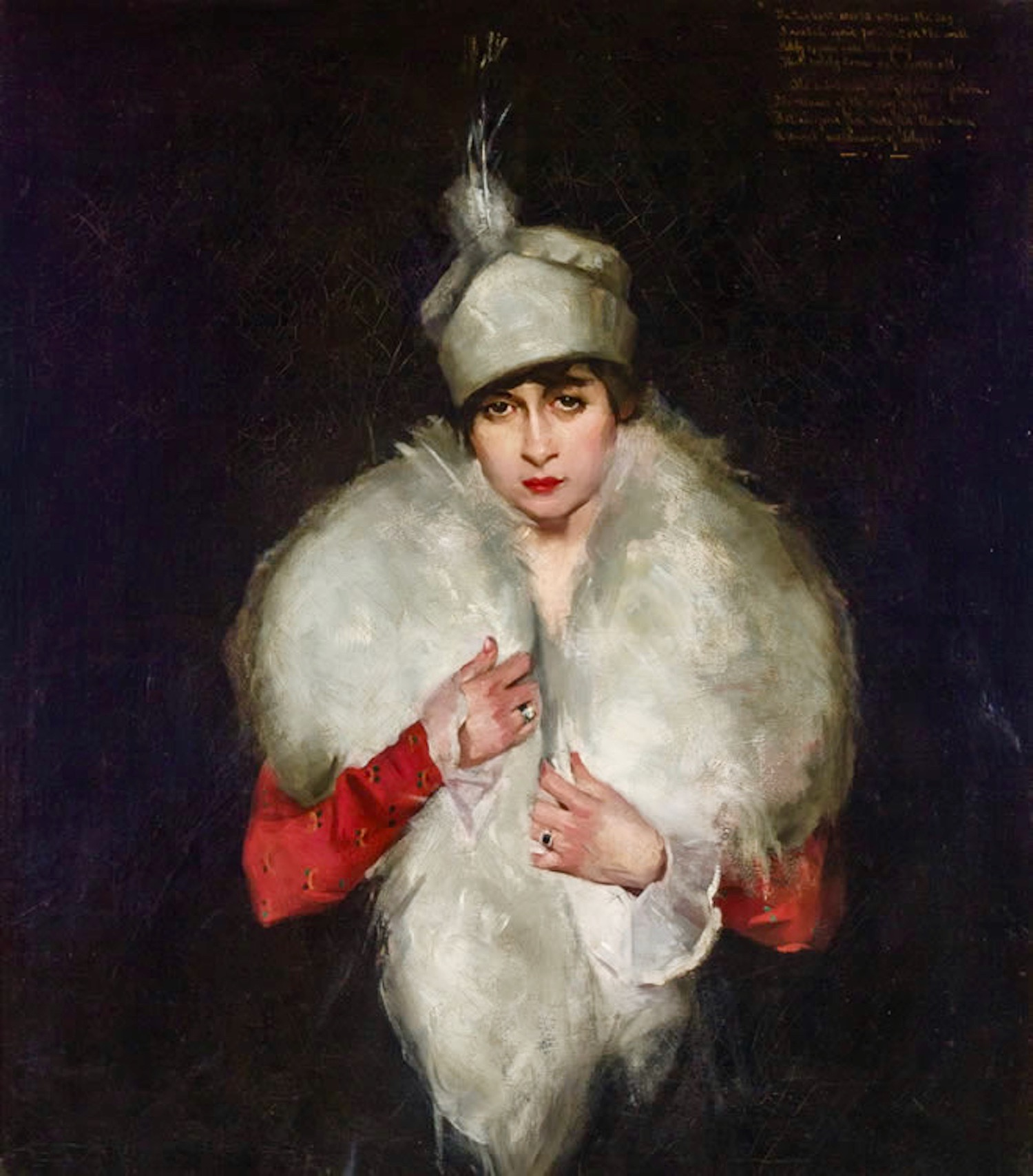
Woman in White Fur Wrap, c. 1920 (Private collection)

Maurice Molarsky (also Morris Molarsky; May 25, 1885 – January 1, 1950) was an American painter known for his portraits, landscapes, and still lifes. His portraits are characterized by a traditional technique reminiscent of Velasquez. His landscapes and still lifes, however, are often painted in an airy, Impressionist style. He was equally comfortable working in either mode. Except for two years in Europe and six during which he kept a studio in New York City, Molarsky lived and worked in Philadelphia.

== Early life ==
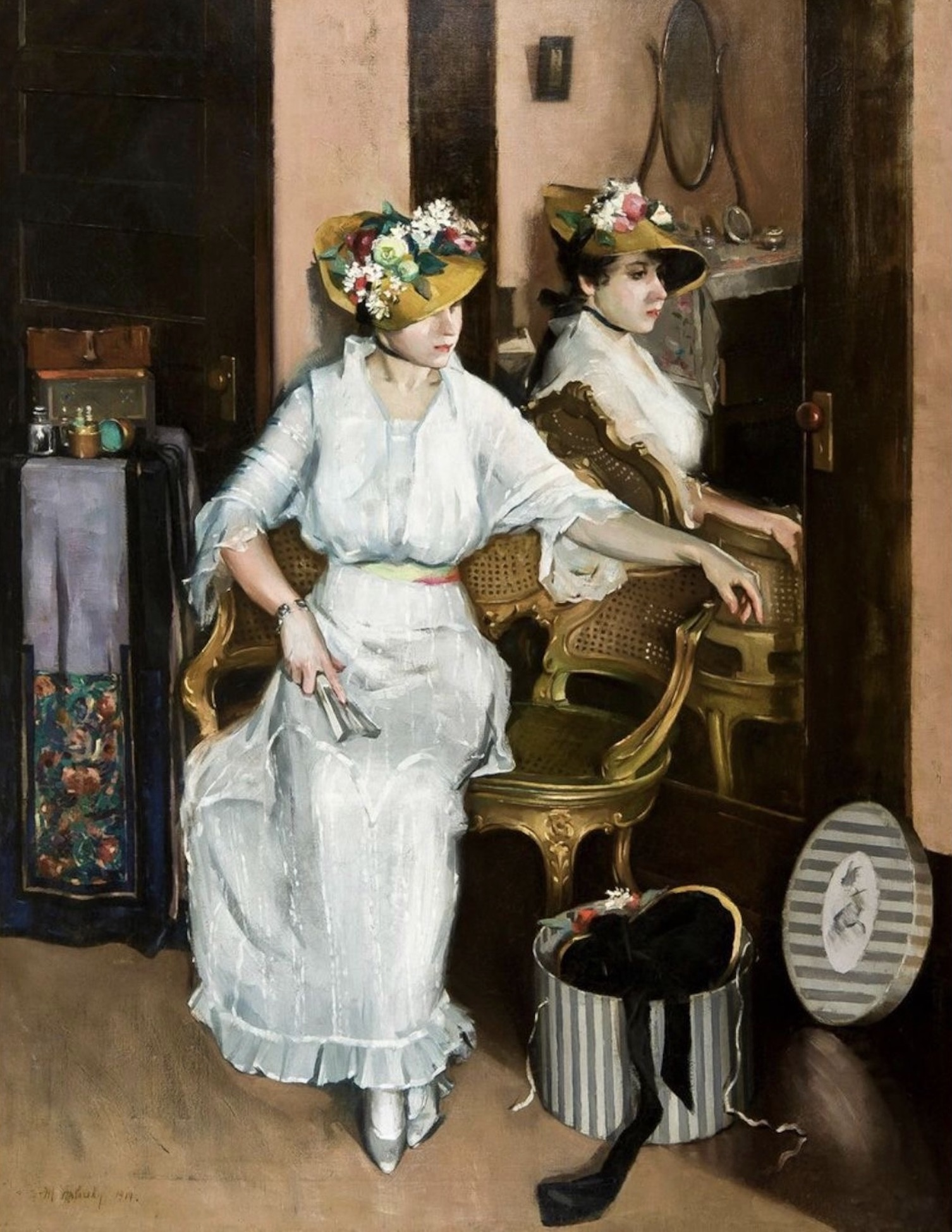
Reflections, 1914 (Private collection)

Born to Jewish parents in Kiev, Russian Empire (now Ukraine), Maurice Molarsky and his family emigrated to the United States via London in the 1880s and settled in Philadelphia. When he was in high school, his artistic abilities were recognized by William Mason, the city's Superintendent of Drawing, and he was awarded a scholarship to study painting at the Pennsylvania Academy of the Fine Arts (PAFA).

At the Academy, Molarsky studied with Thomas Pollock Anshutz and William Merritt Chase, and was awarded the Cresson Traveling Scholarship for 1904 and 1905. He spent the summer of 1904 at St. Ives, in Cornwall, under the tutelage of American painter Walter Elmer Schofield.

For the next two years, Molarsky studied and worked in Paris, where he had a studio at Rue de Vaugirard, No. 93. While in the French capital, Molarsky became friends with Alfred Henry Maurer, who was later one of the first American modernists. Molarsky's brother Abram Molarsky, also a painter, joined him in Paris in 1905. In November of that year, Maurice visited museums in Germany, Belgium, and the Netherlands to gain a broader understanding of European painting traditions.

In April 1906, Maurice returned to Philadelphia, where he spent most of his professional life, except for six years when he maintained a studio in New York City.

== Career ==
One of the first works that Molarsky completed on his return to the United States was a large portrait of his father, Issac Hyman Molarsky. That canvas is now in the collection of the Pennsylvania Academy of the Fine Arts in Philadelphia. The young artist opened his first U.S. studio on Chestnut Street in Philadelphia and soon was working on commissioned portraits. He began showing his work annually at the Pennsylvania Academy and was awarded the Fellowship Prize there in 1909. In 1908 his work was accepted for the prestigious biennial exhibition at the Corcoran Gallery of Art in Washington DC. Molarsky's work would appear there 13 times from 1908 to 1939.

Molarsky's reputation grew, as his work was shown in Pittsburgh, Baltimore, Buffalo, and Boston. He established a New York studio at 38 West 67th Street in 1914 and began to be represented by the city's Macbeth Gallery. The following year, one of his works won the Silver Medal at the Panama-Pacific International Exposition in San Francisco.

In 1916 Molarsky married Tina Margolies of Philadelphia, who became one of his favorite models, appearing in such works as "Woman in White Fur Wrap" and "Reflections" of 1914.

The couple lived in Manhattan for the next six years. After spending the summer of 1922 traveling in Spain and France, they moved back to Philadelphia, where Molarsky set up a new studio at 10 South 18th Street.

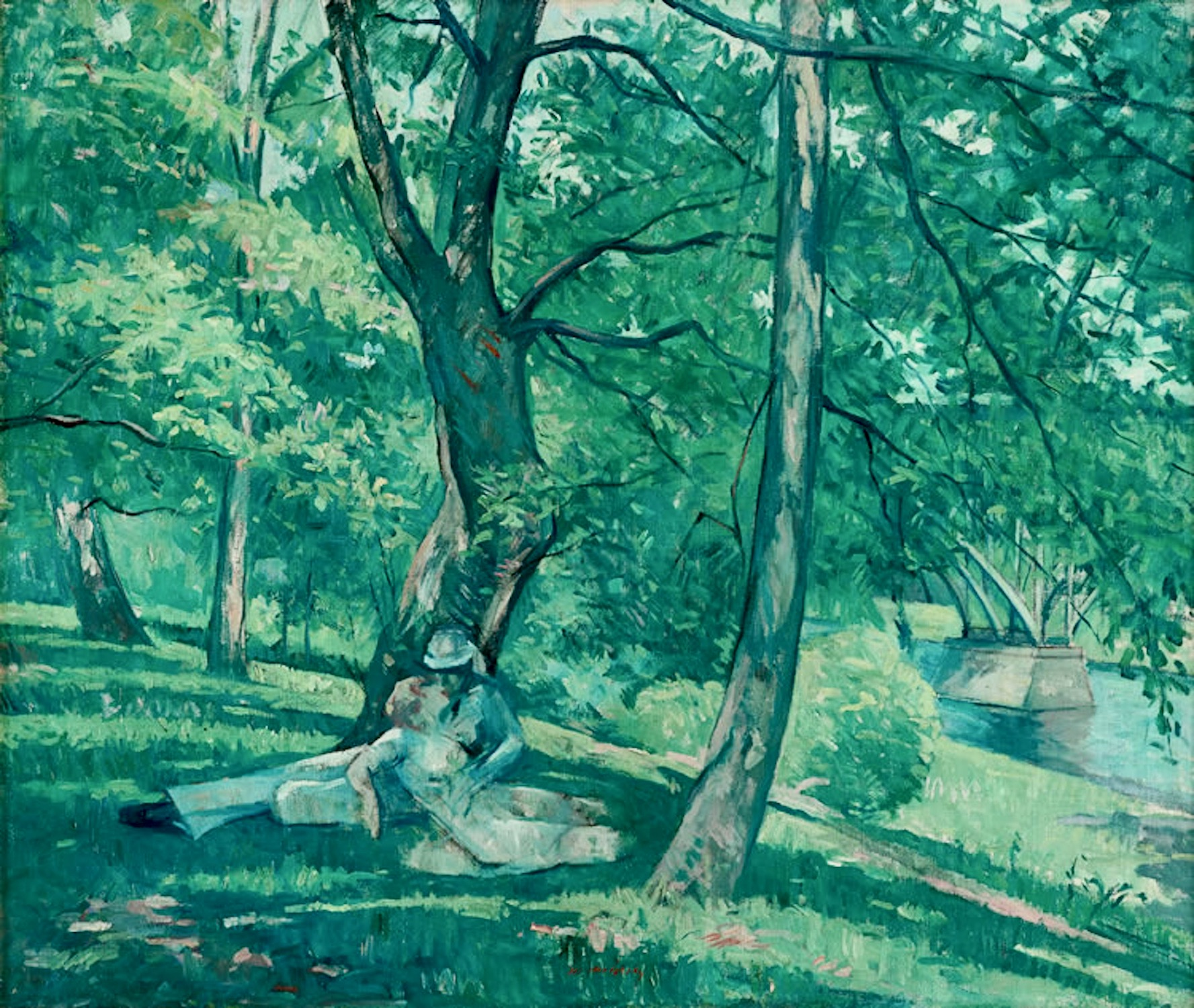
Lovers in the Park (Fairmount), c. 1920 (Private collection)

Throughout the 1920s and 1930s, Molarsky continued to show his work at some of the nation's leading venues, including the National Academy of Design in New York. In 1931 Philadelphia's Newman Galleries held a wide-ranging retrospective of Molarsky's portraits, landscapes, and still lifes. The review in the Philadelphia Inquirer took special note of "The Connoisseur," Molarsky's portrait of fellow painter Eugene Castello:

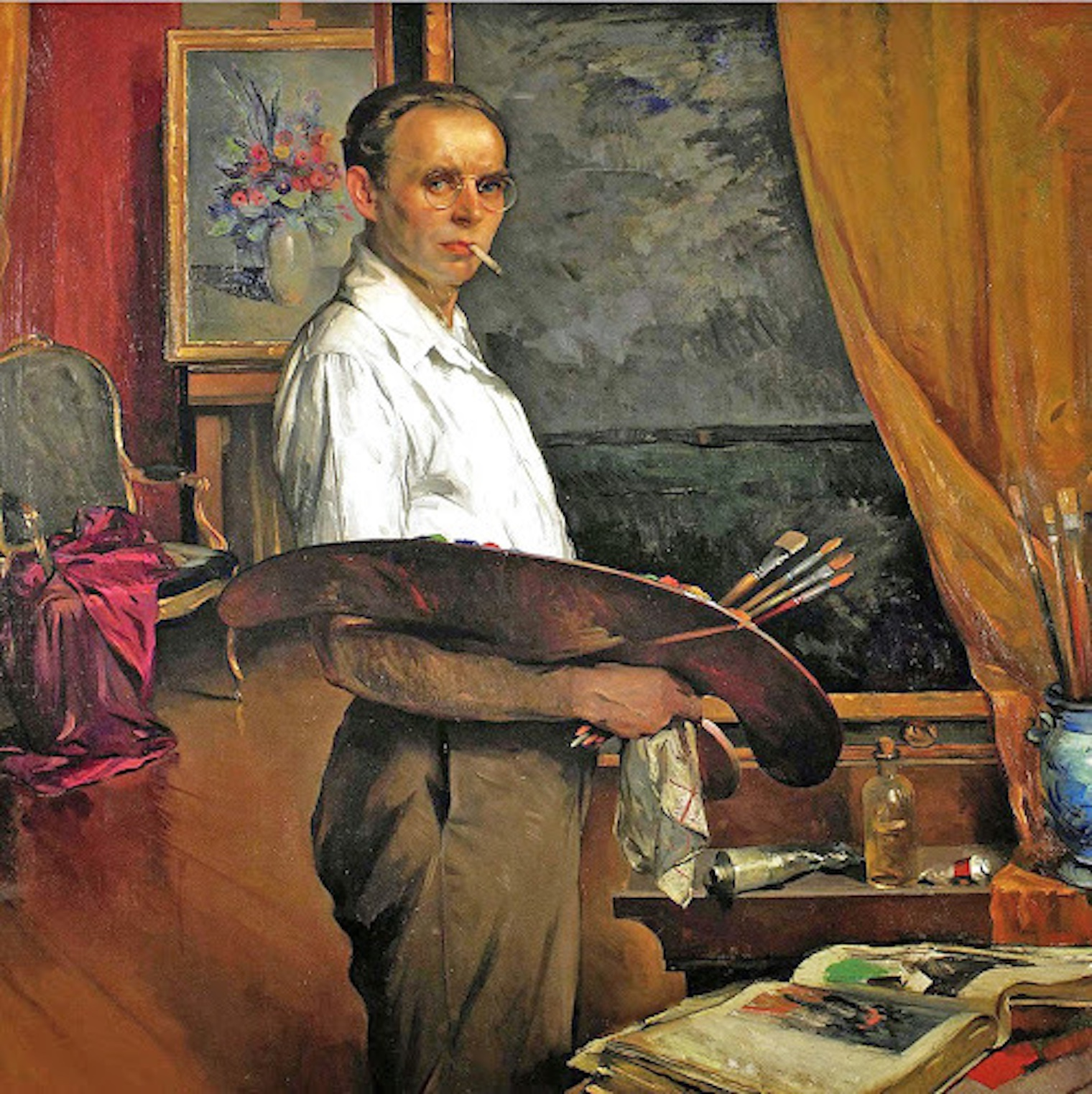
Self Portrait, c. 1925 (Private collection)

Eugene Castello [was] himself an artist, and among the last of the fast disappearing "gentlemen of the old school" in Philadelphia. He was a most paintable character, with his slender, ascetic face, touched with certain lines of worldly wisdom, and Mr. Molarsky has here furnished a remarkable memorial of a remarkable man.

The portrait won the Silver Medal at Philadelphia's Sesquicentennial Exposition in 1926 and is now in the collection of the Pennsylvania Academy of the Fine Arts. By 1935 Molarsky had moved his studio to 2101 Spruce Street in Philadelphia. The Art Alliance in the city staged a one-man show of his work in January 1938, showcasing his recent landscapes. Welden Bailey's review in Philadelphia Art News noted that:

Molarsky's technical mastery is undeniable. He seems always to place upon canvas exactly what he intends, and when concentrating upon trees, mountains, and the sea, the result is not only as convincing as his portraiture, but infinitely more eloquent ... In "The On-Coming Fog," the painter's characteristic finish is sacrificed to a more dramatic ruggedness of treatment and retains, in consequence, more aesthetic impact than any of the other canvases.

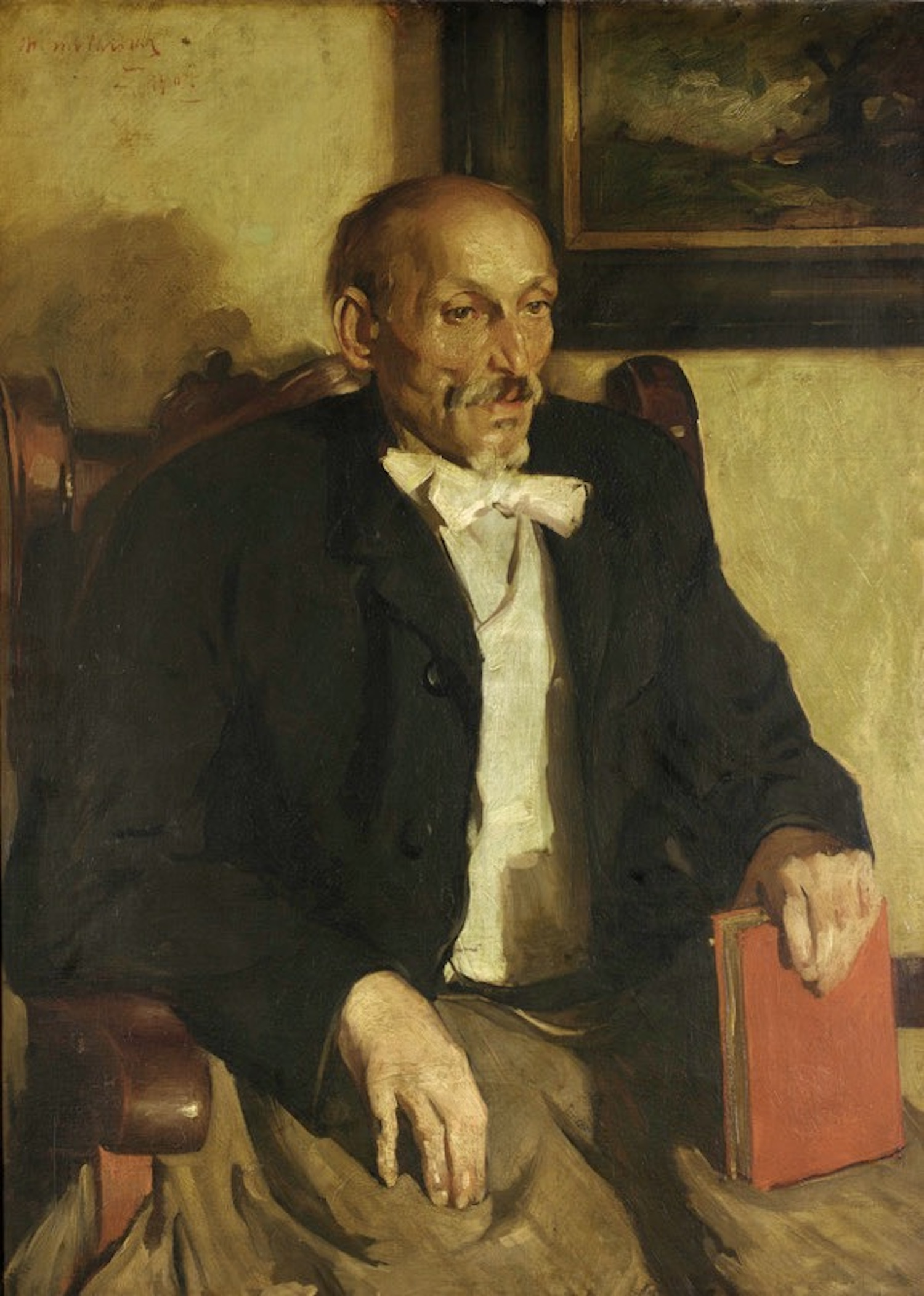
My Father (Hyman Isaac Molarsky), 1907 (Pennsylvania Academy of the Fine Arts)

During the 1930s, Maurice regularly commuted to the state capital in Harrisburg to teach, and, in the spring of 1939, the State Museum there had a major exhibition of his portraits and landscapes.

The largest retrospective exhibition of Molarsky's work took place at Philadelphia's Woodmere Gallery in November 1944 and was described in the Philadelphia Inquirer by C.H. Bonte:

Nearly 100 examples of his work reveal this busy Philadelphia artist in all his aspects, but it is still as a portrait painter that he is most admired. He is especially outstanding as a delineator of women and to all such subjects he gives as air of smartness best described as Gallic.

Molarsky died in 1950, and in September and October the Philadelphia Academy held a memorial exhibition that included 51 paintings from an array of institutional and private collections. The continued appeal of Molarsky's work was demonstrated by his inclusion in a group show at the Newman Galleries in Philadelphia in 1995.

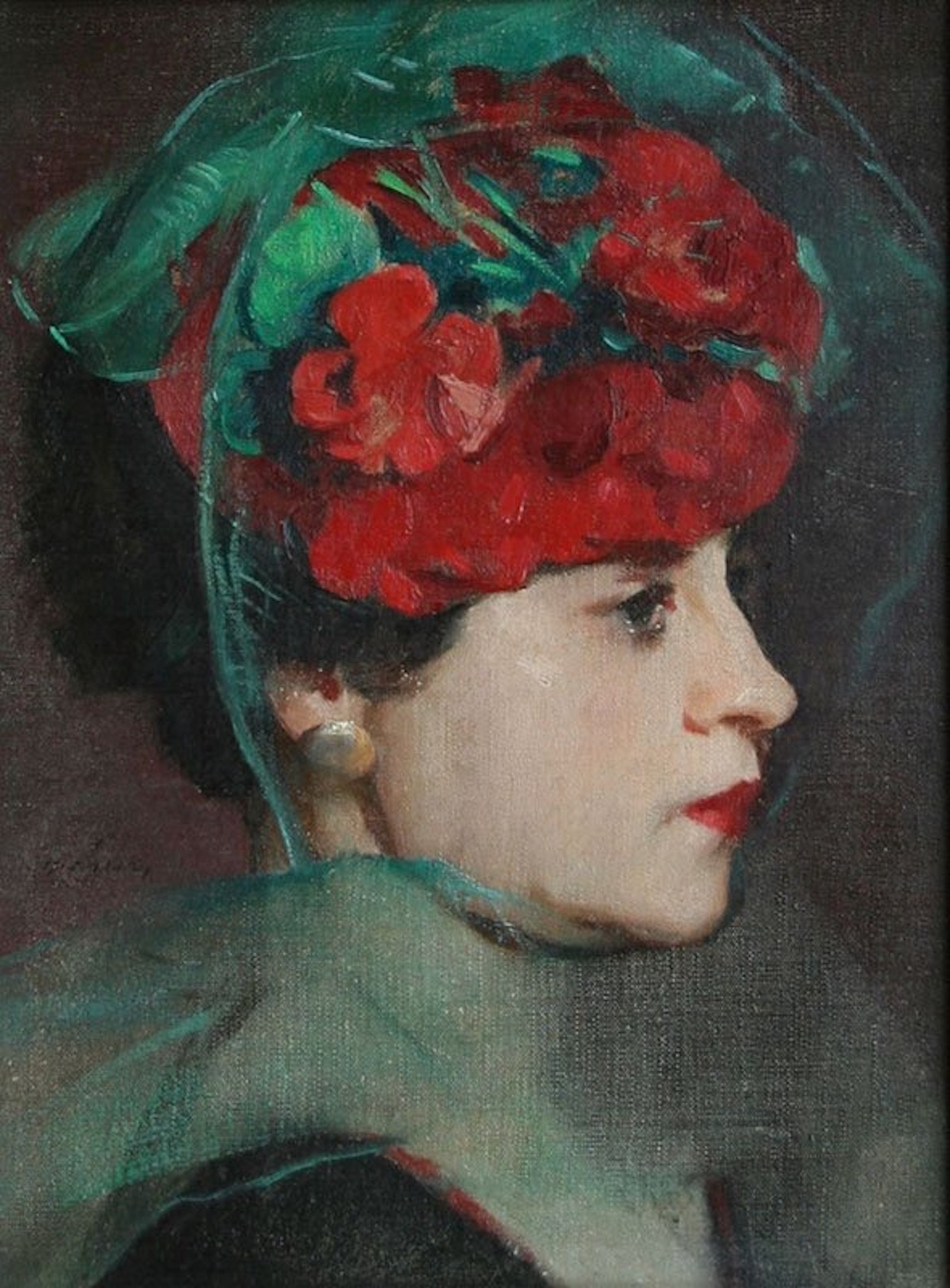
"Portrait of Tina in a Red Hat," c. 1920 (Private collection)

Examples of Maurice Molarsky's paintings are held by the Pennsylvania Academy of the Fine Arts the Athenaeum of Philadelphia, the Penn Art collection at the University of Pennsylvania, the Woodmere Art Museum and the Princeton University Art Museum

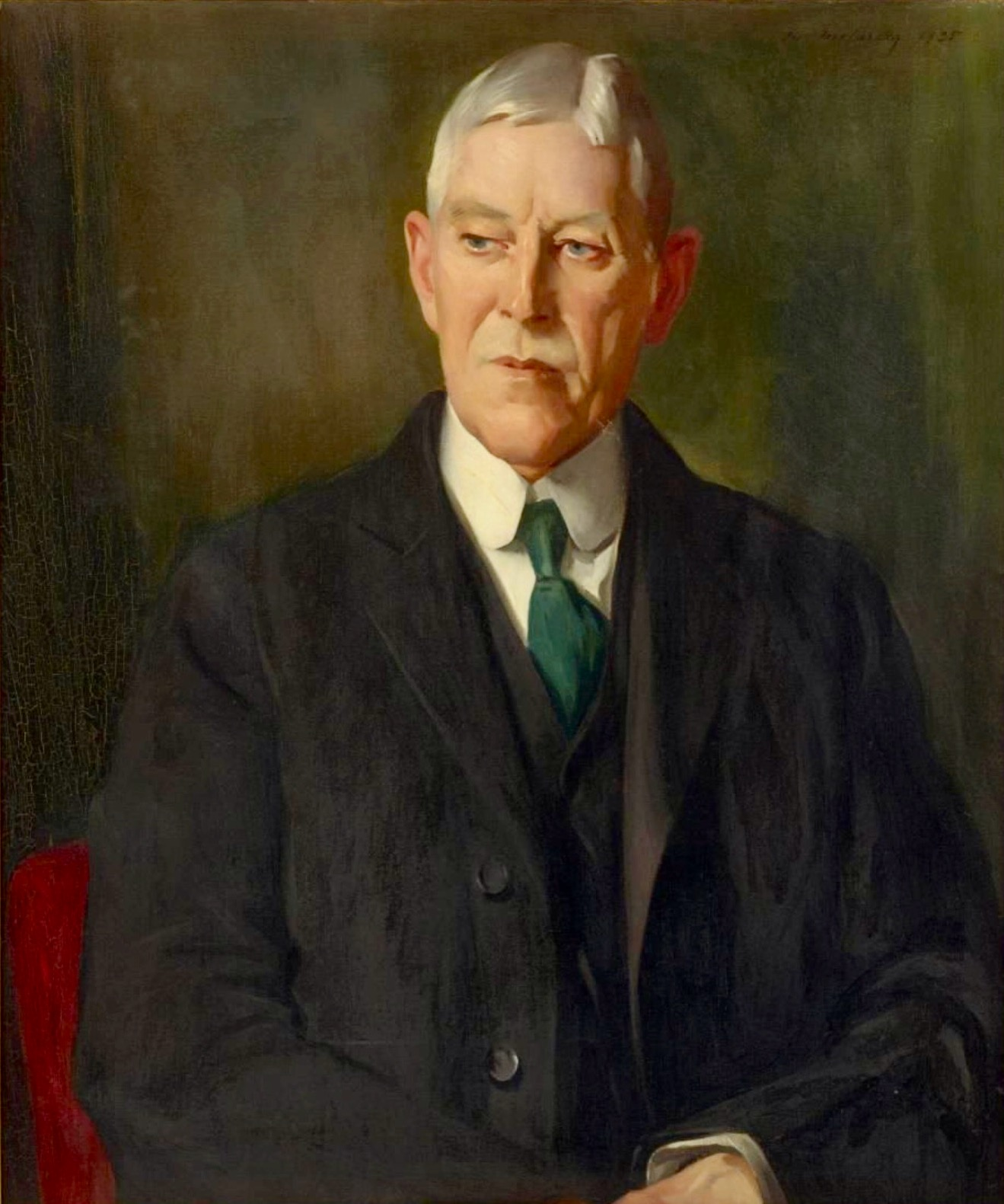
Portrait of Howard W. Lewis, c. 1936 (The Atheneum of Philadelphia)

== Sources ==
- Who's Was Who in American Art, 1985; second edition 2001.
- Dictionary of American Painters, Sculptors, and Engravers (ed., Mantle Fielding).
- Annual Exhibition Record, Pennsylvania Academy of the Fine Arts, 1876-1913
- Annual Exhibition Record, National Academy of Design, 1901-1950
- Biennial Exhibition Record, Corcoran Gallery of Art
