= Abram Molarsky =

American painter (1880–1955)

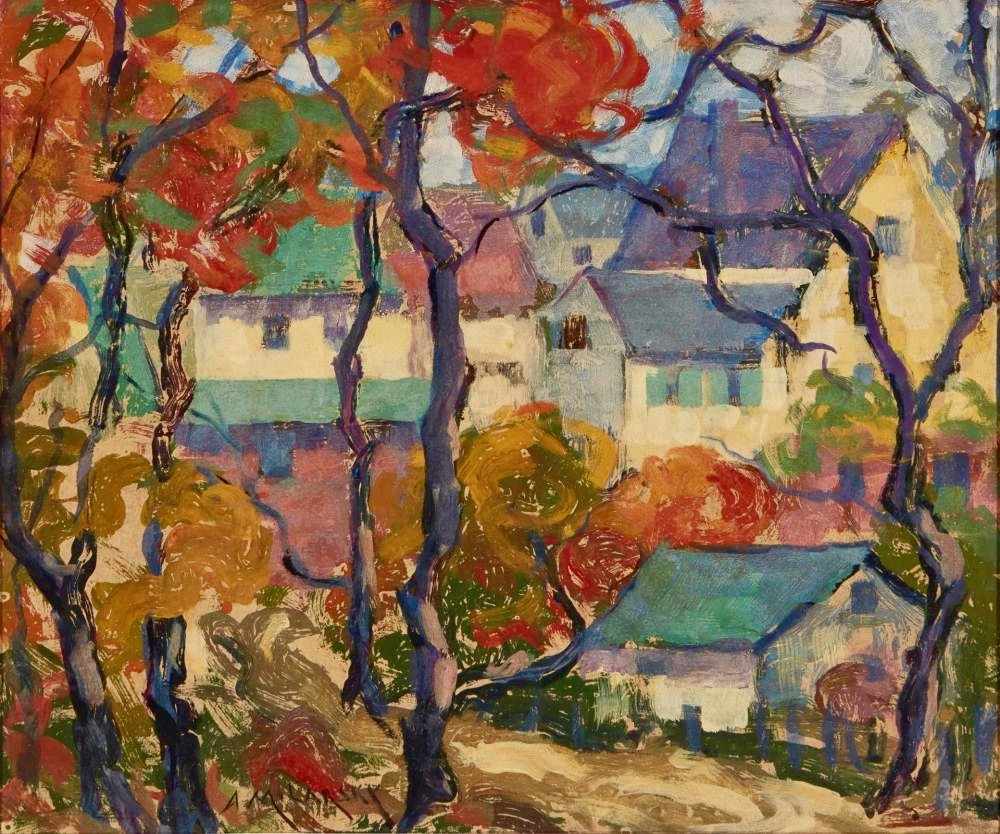
Expressionist Landscape (Nutley Museum, Nutley, New Jersey)

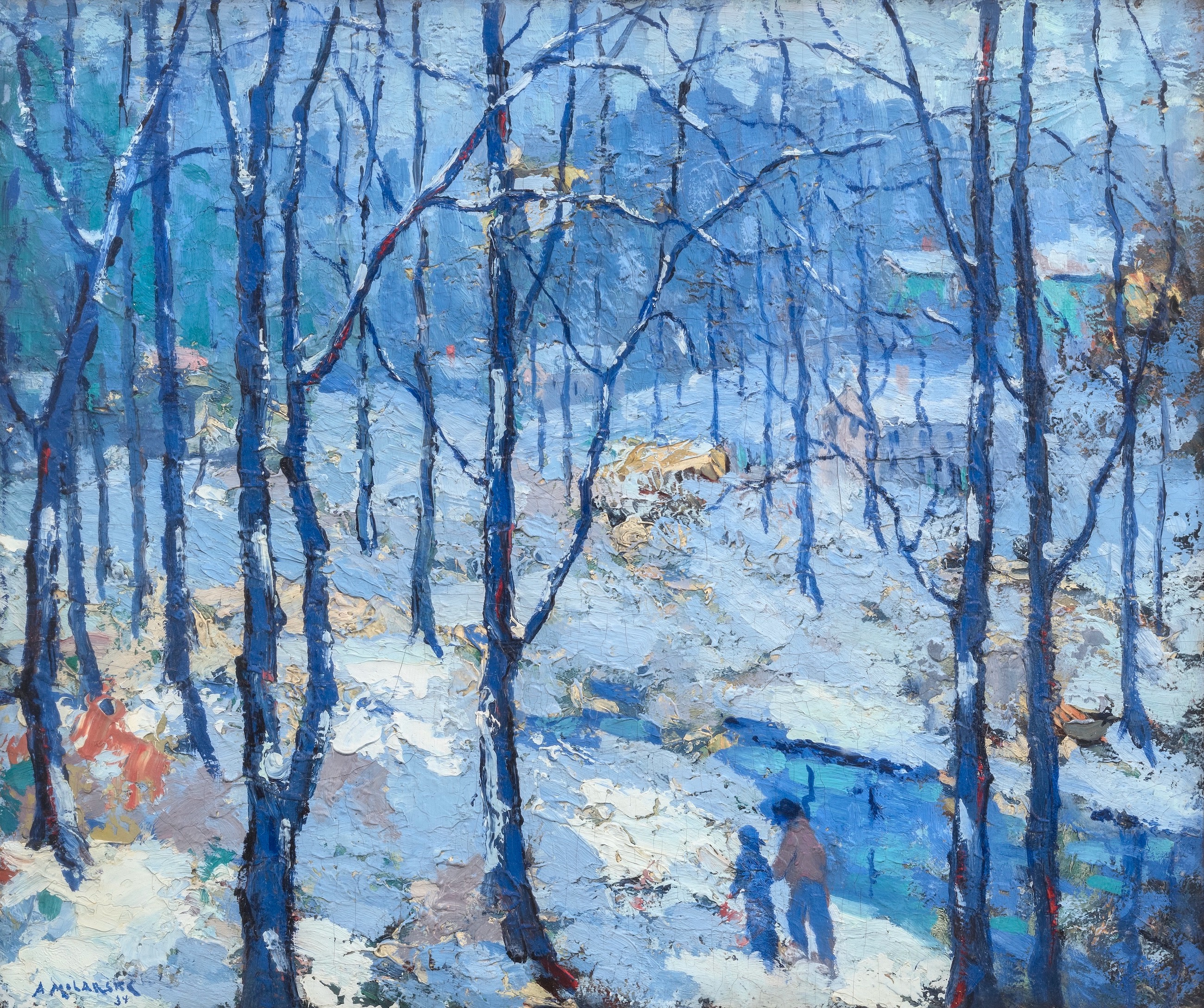
The Park in Snow, 1934 (Private collection)

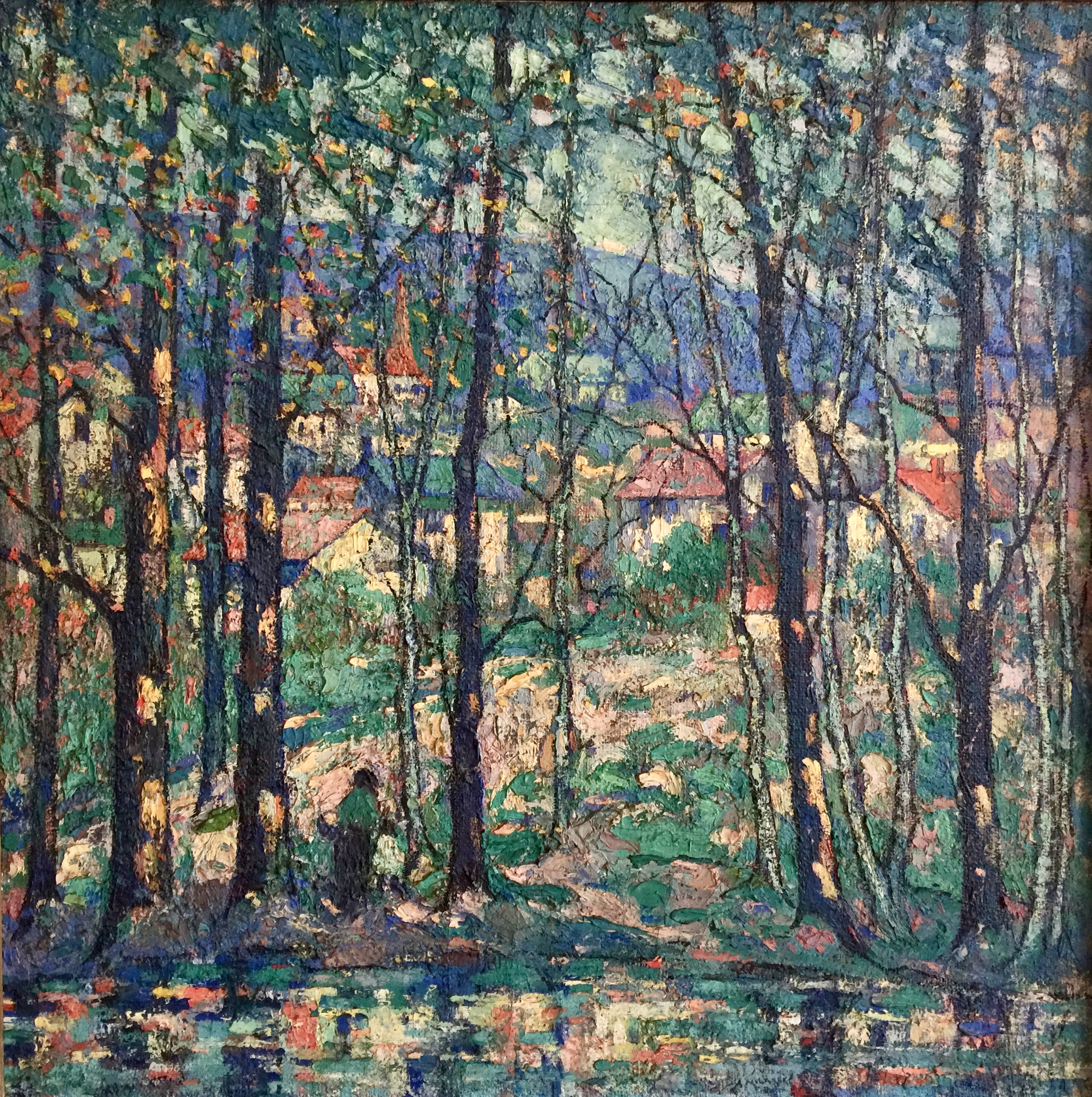
The Village through the Trees (Private collection)

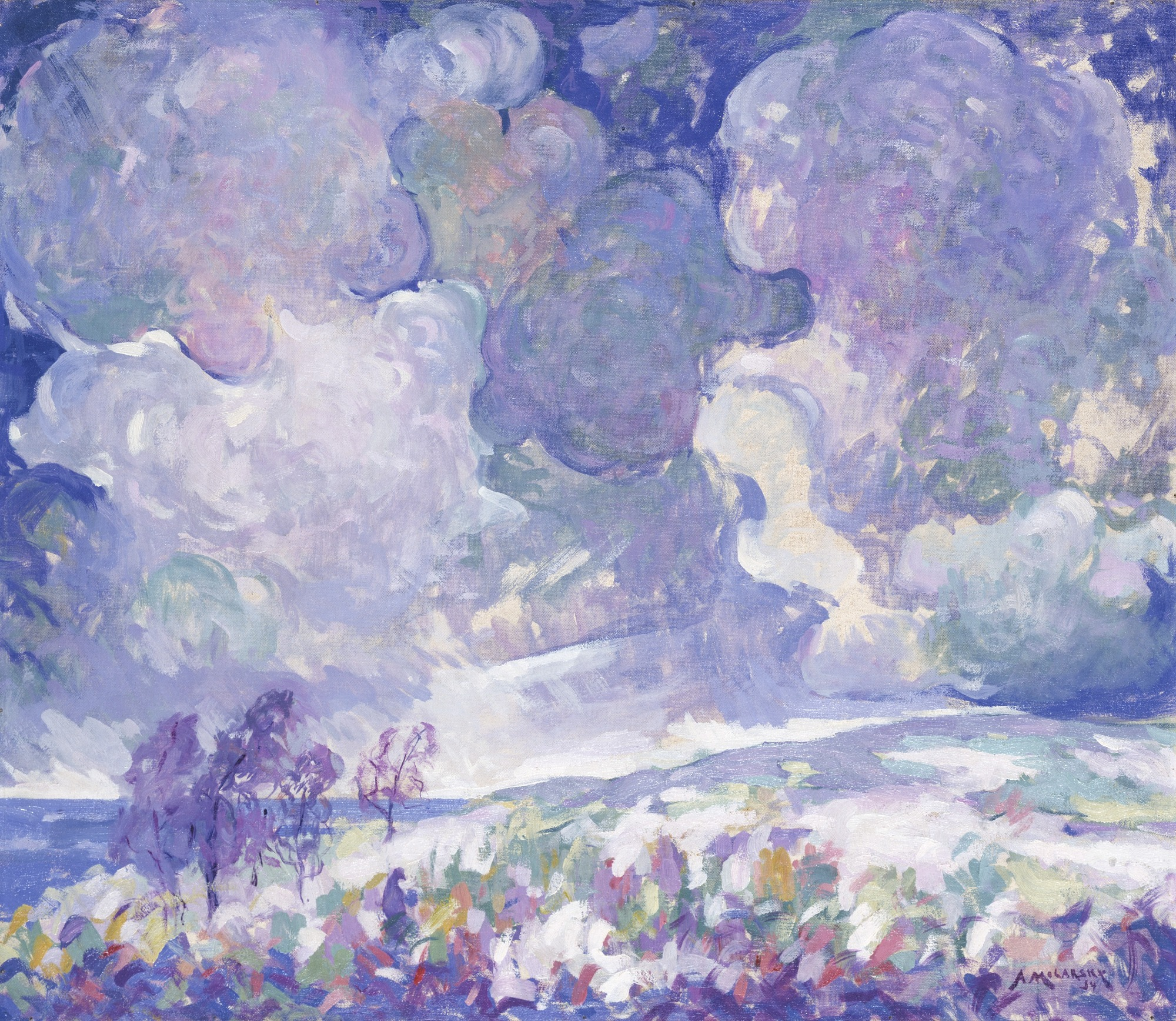
The Storm, 1934 (Smithsonian American Art Museum)

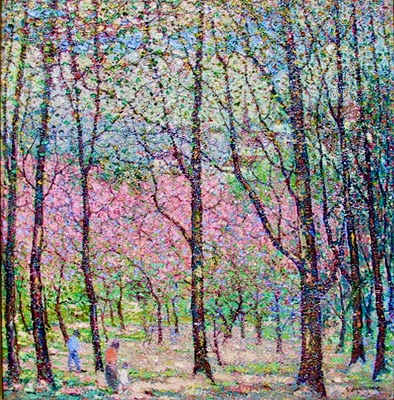
The Peach Orchard, 1920 (Private collection)

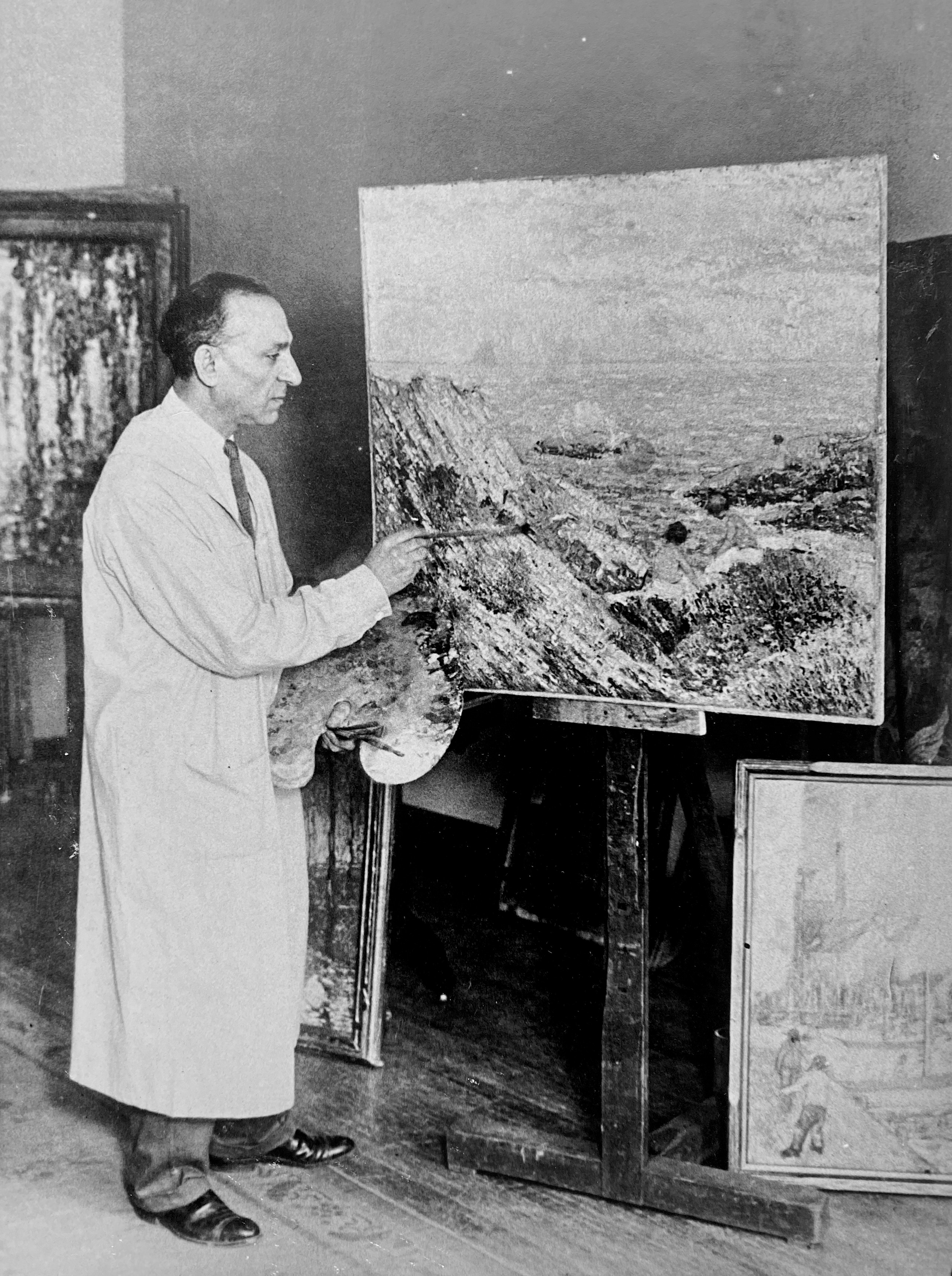
Abram Molarsky at his easel, circa 1935.

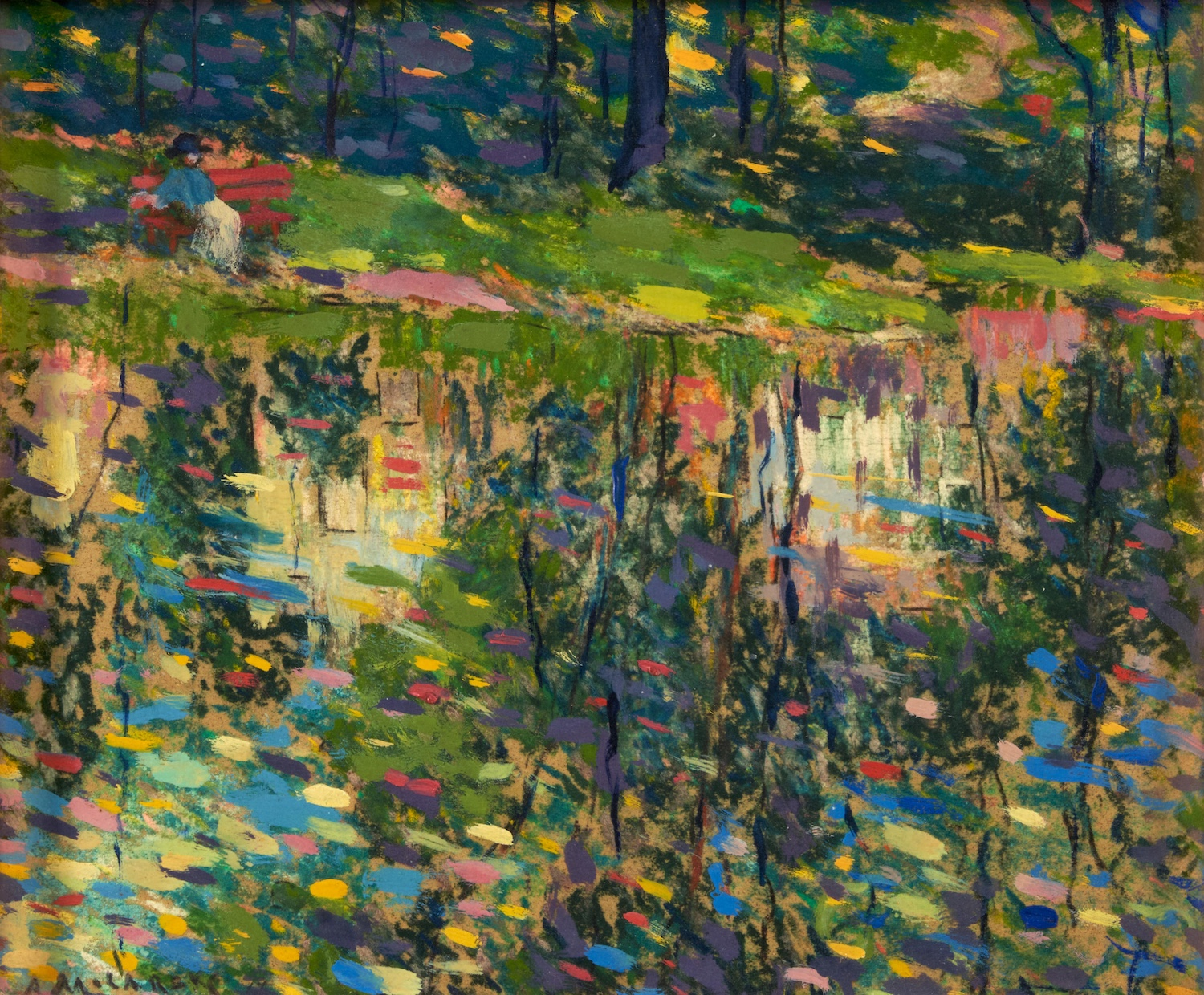
Reflections, 1919 (Private collection)

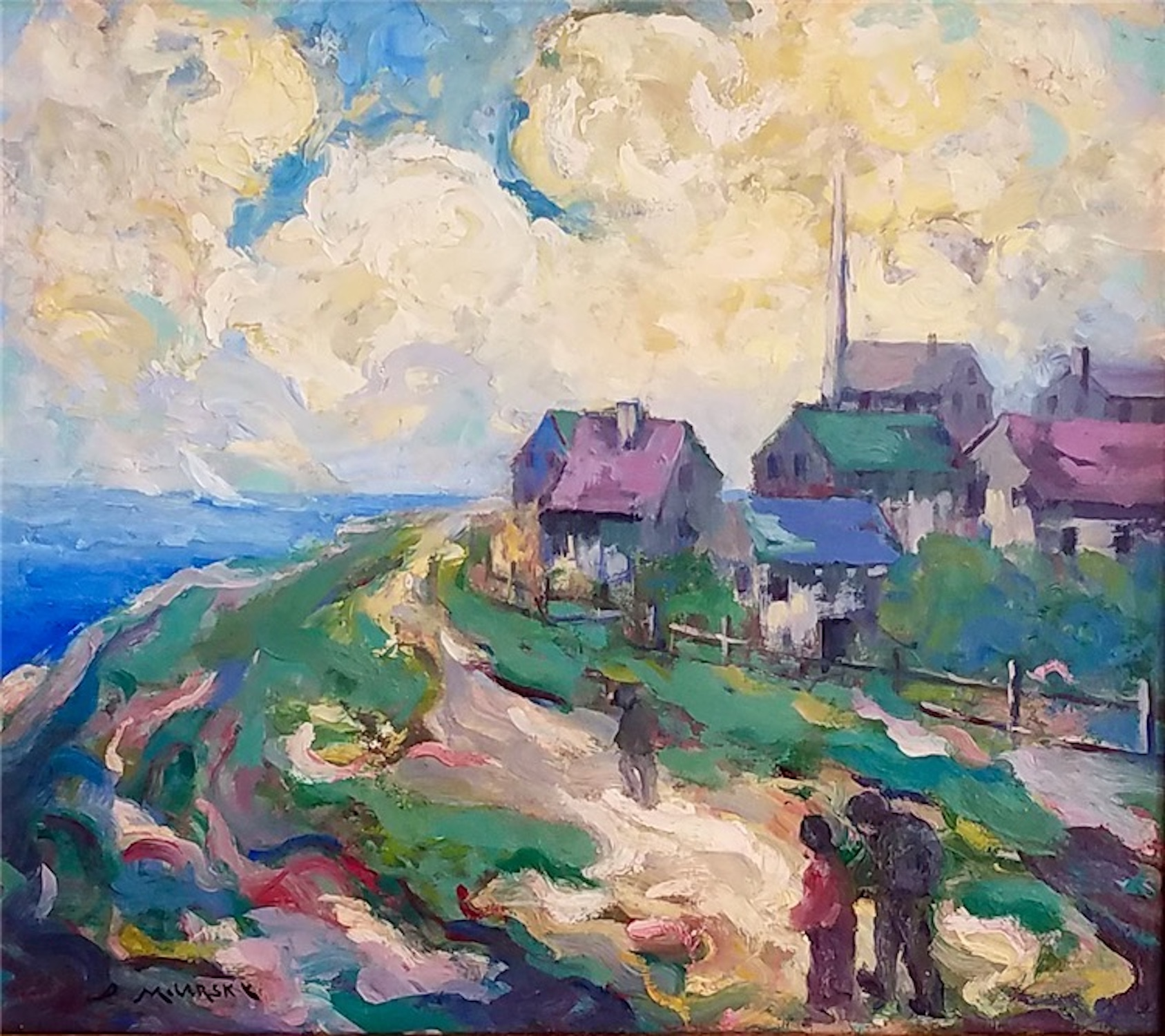
Cape Cod (Provincetown), c. 1915 (Private collection)

Abram Molarsky (also Abraham Molarsky; September 25, 1880 – May 4, 1955) was an American impressionist and post-impressionist artist, known primarily as a landscape painter and a colorist. His work is characterized by rich hues and strong, textured brushwork. He worked in Philadelphia, Boston, Provincetown, Gloucester, Rockport, and various places in New Jersey.

== Early life ==
Born into a Jewish family in Kyiv, then part of the Russian Empire (now Ukraine), Molarsky immigrated with his parents and brother Maurice to the United States via London in 1887. To help support the family, he played violin in the nascent Philadelphia Orchestra. In 1889 he began studying painting at the Pennsylvania Academy of the Fine Arts in Philadelphia. His teachers included William Merritt Chase, Thomas Anshutz, and Cecilia Beaux.

Abram Molarsky and his younger brother Maurice Molarsky, who was also a student at the Pennsylvania Academy, went to Paris to continue their artistic studies. Maurice arrived in 1904 and set up a studio at 93 rue de Vaugirard in Montparnasse. Abram joined him in 1905.

In Paris, Abram was inspired by the French Impressionists and Post Impressionists to focus on light and color. There he met his future wife, Philadelphia painter and illustrator Sarah Ann Shreve, who was sharing a studio on rue de la Grande Chaumière with another Philadelphia painter, Anne Estelle Rice.

Molarsky returned to Philadelphia in 1906 by way of London, where his teacher William Merritt Chase had provided him with an introduction to painter John Singer Sargent. Molarsky met with Sargent in his Chelsea studio and was given a tour that included Sargent's storeroom. It was filled with portraits that Sargent's clients had rejected. Don't become a portrait painter, the great man advised him. At the time, Sargent himself was on the verge of giving up portrait painting. Molarsky took his advice to heart and thereafter focused mainly on landscapes and still lifes.

In 1908 Molarsky married Sarah Ann Shreve in Philadelphia. Shortly thereafter, the two moved to the Boston area and settled into a house on Front Street in Weymouth, Massachusetts. They stayed in the Boston area for seven years, where Sarah gave birth to two sons, Osmond in 1909 and Delmar in 1913. They sometimes summered in Provincetown before moving to New Jersey in 1916.

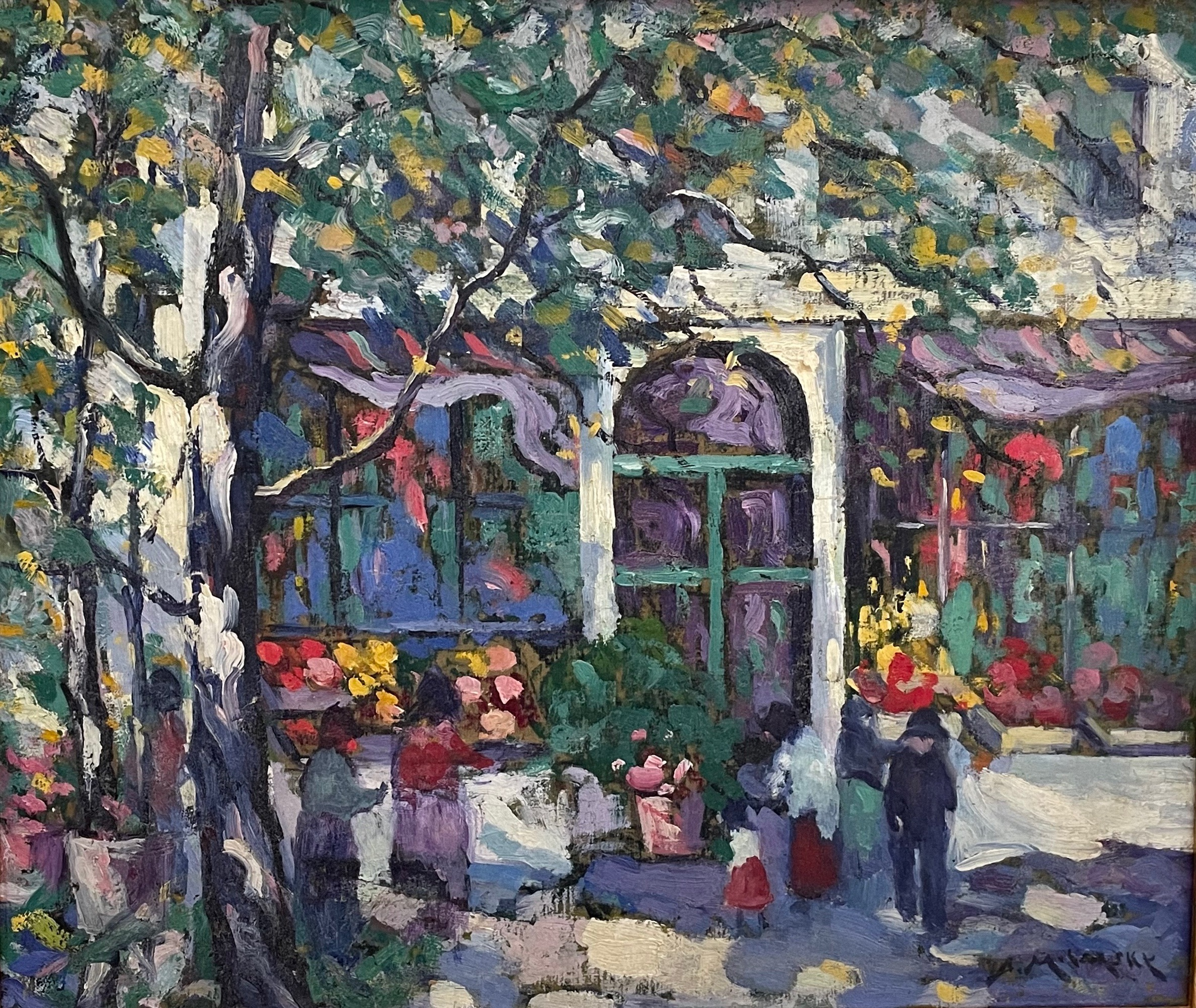
The Flower Shop, c. 1925 (Private collection)

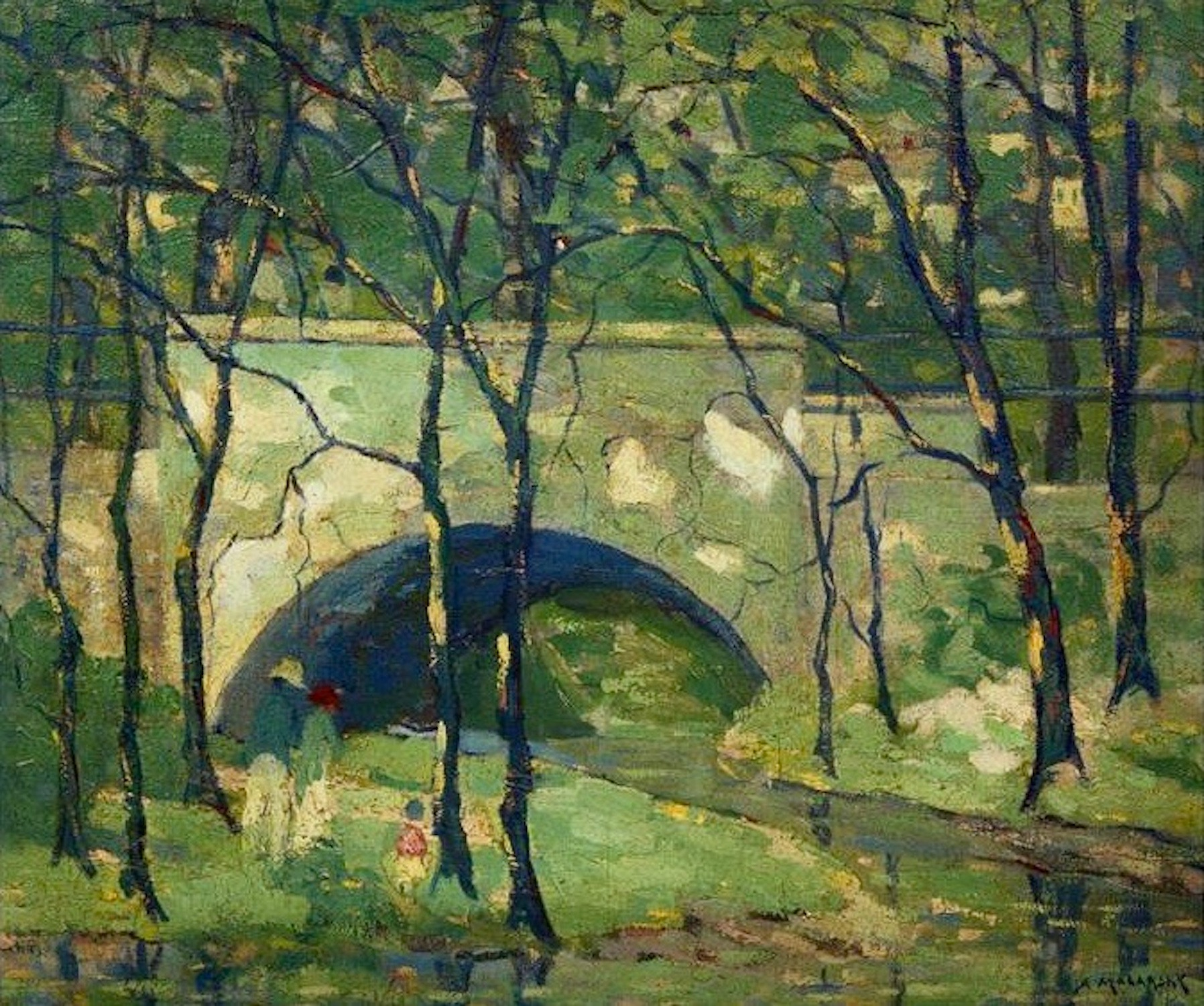
Bridge Scene, undated (Private collection)

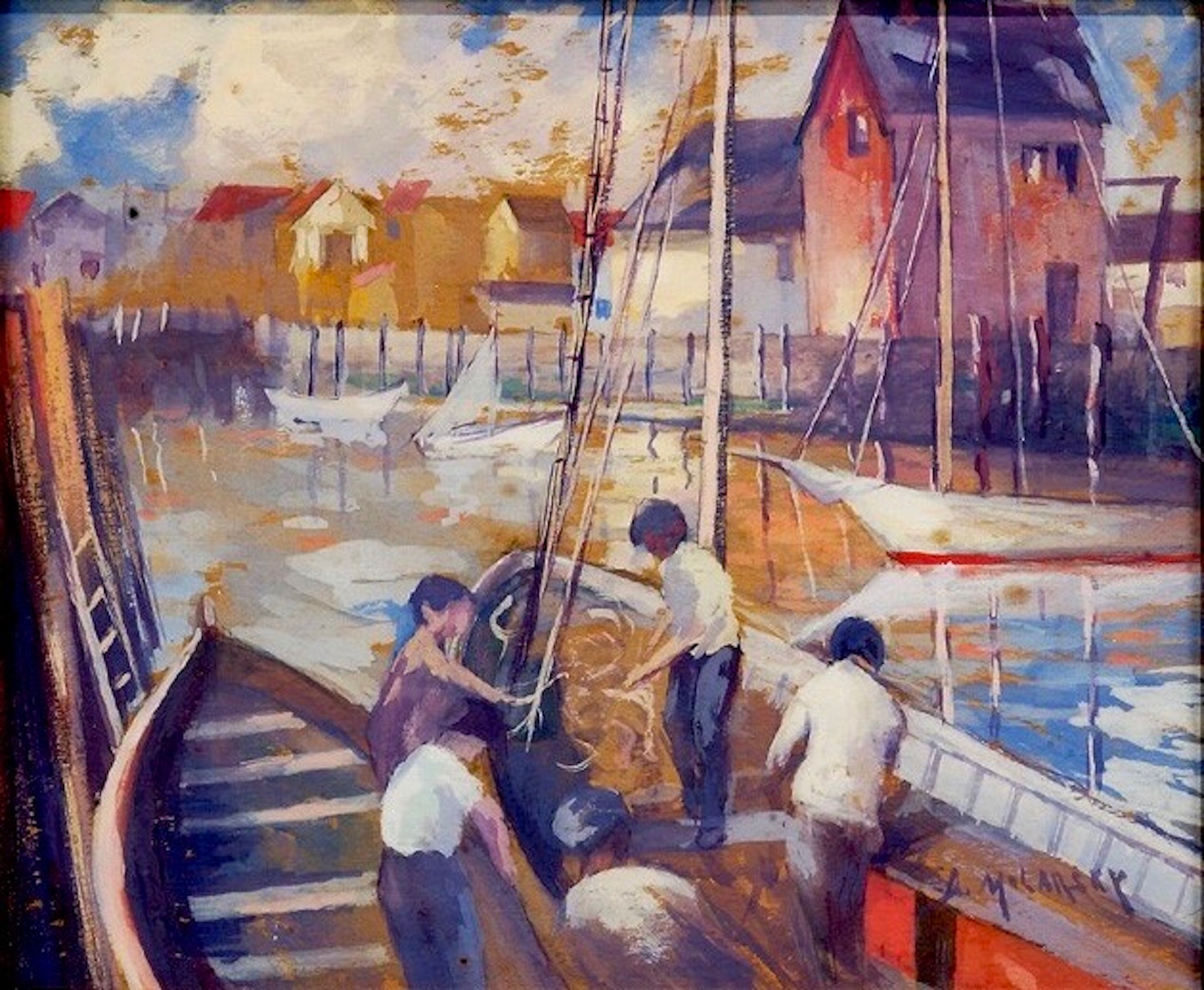
"Harbor Scene," c. 1925 (Private collection)

== Career ==
In 1914, Molarsky had his first solo show at the Doll & Richards Gallery in Boston. "Molarsky's color is delicate, refined and harmonious," wrote critic William Howe Downes, who had authored books about American painters Winslow Homer and John Singer Sargent.

The show was also reviewed in the Philadelphia Inquirer, whose critic placed Molarsky's work in the wider context of contemporary American painting:

There are hints of both Twachtman and Whistler influences in his work -- influences wholesomely assimilated and made part of his own interesting personality. In this, his first one-man show, Molarsky has made a decided impression upon the Boston public, and it would seem that his future, in the artistic sense, is assured.

Molarsky and his family often spent summers in the Massachusetts seaside towns of Provincetown, Gloucester, and Rockport. In 1915 he was invited to show his work in Provincetown's first annual exhibition, which would become a staple of American cultural life.

The following year, the Molarsky family moved to New Jersey, where Molarsky spent the rest of his life. Many of the landscapes he painted are scenes of the local parks, woods and fields near Nutley, where he and his wife often worked en plein air.

In 1922 a writer for The Boston Evening Transcript visited Molarsky's summer studio in Rocky Neck, Gloucester and remarked that his paintings had "a rich and translucent patina of color." He described one landscape: "Delightful to the senses is a little scene from the moors overlooking the harbor, with its fresh notations of color, flight of green, soft distance and rolling clouds."

For nearly four decades, Molarsky was invited to show his work at such venues as the National Academy of Design and the American Watercolor Society in New York, the Corcoran Gallery of Art in Washington, the Pennsylvania Academy of the Fine Arts, the Carnegie Museum in Pittsburgh, the Art Institute of Chicago, the Newark Museum, the Newark Art Club, and The Montclair Art Museum. From early in his career, he was represented by The Milch Gallery in New York.

The Montclair Art Museum in New Jersey presented a retrospective of Molarsky's work in 1928 that included 22 landscapes and seascapes. The Monclair Times praised the paintings' "richness and depth and color" and the "dramatic feeling in [Molarsky's] portrayal of nature. The woods, hills, and fields . . . speak and act out a story."

Molarsky once reflected on the effect of his early experience as a professional violinist on his painting; the occasion was an interview with Edward Southern Hipp for the Newark Evening News:

[Molarsky's] forte is landscapes. He paints scenes as he sees them, but he sees them with the eyes on an impressionist who glories in warm colors. Moreover, he sees them with the eyes of a musician, and, as he tells one, “a musician has an advantage as an artist. There is tone and harmony in art, as well as in music. None of it escapes the musician.”

In that same interview, Molarsky explained why, through all the changes in the art world that occurred in the course of his career, he remained committed to an Impressionist vision:

We cannot escape that the French lead the way in art. Only the other day I visited the Metropolitan Museum of Art in New York and viewed the groups of paintings arranged according to countries. The products of France stood out boldly. Its artists are daring without being ridiculous; their paintings are impressionist without being fantastic.

In 1934 the National Academy of Design gave the place of honor at its annual exhibition in New York to one of Molarsky's paintings—a landscape in blues. His work flanked the recently completed bronze bust of President Roosevelt by Jo Davidson.

Some highlights of Molarsky's later years were a one-man show at the Park Art Gallery in New York and exhibitions at the Newark Art Club and the Montclair Art Museum. In addition to doing his own work, Molarsky was also an active teacher. He taught painting at the Newark Public School of Fine and Applied Art and the Nutley Board of Education's Adult School. In addition, he and his wife Sarah gave classes in painting, watercolor, and pastel in their studio, and they and their students were often seen working en plein air in the parks and other open spaces near their home in Nutley.

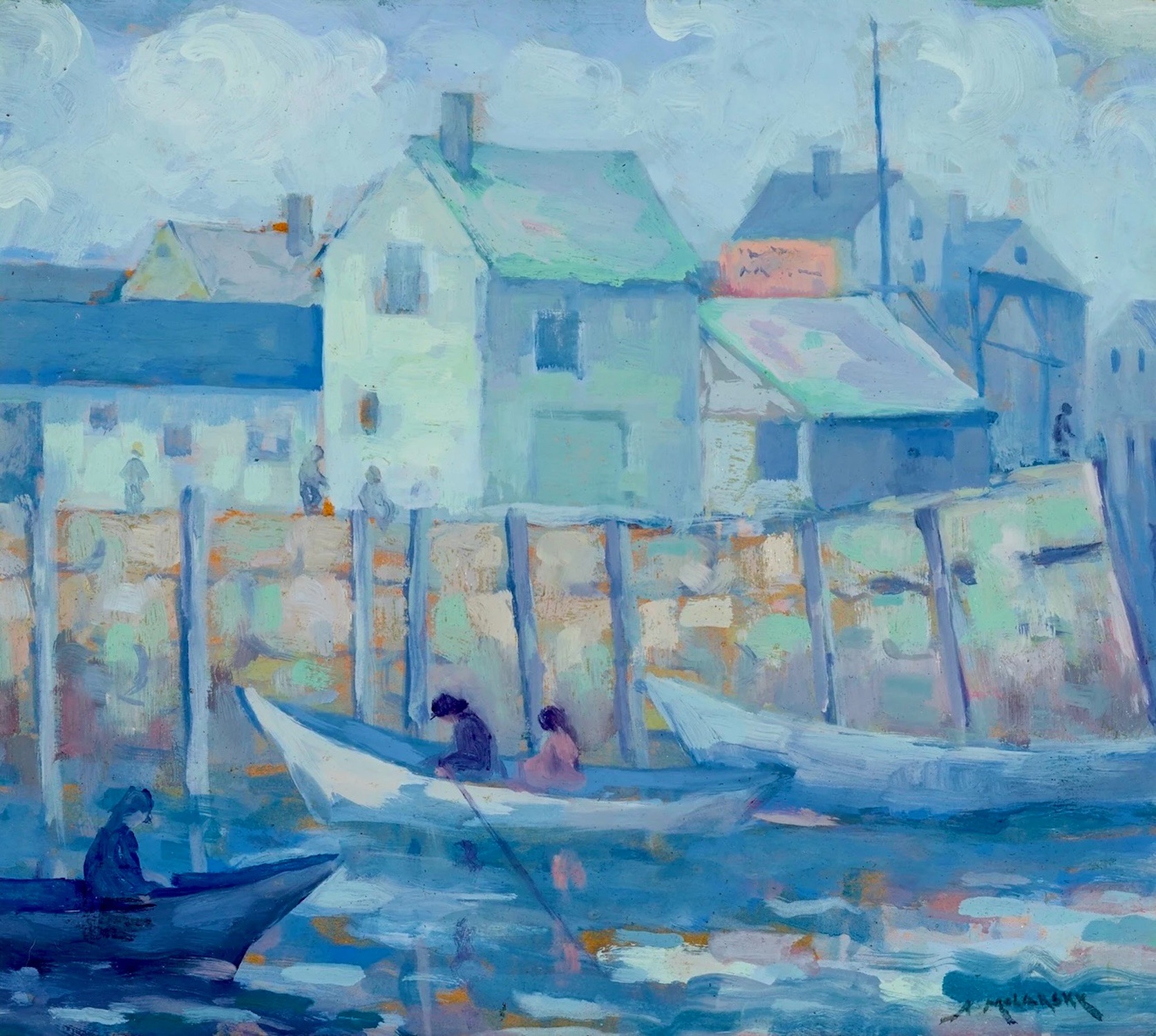
Fish Houses, undated (Private collection)

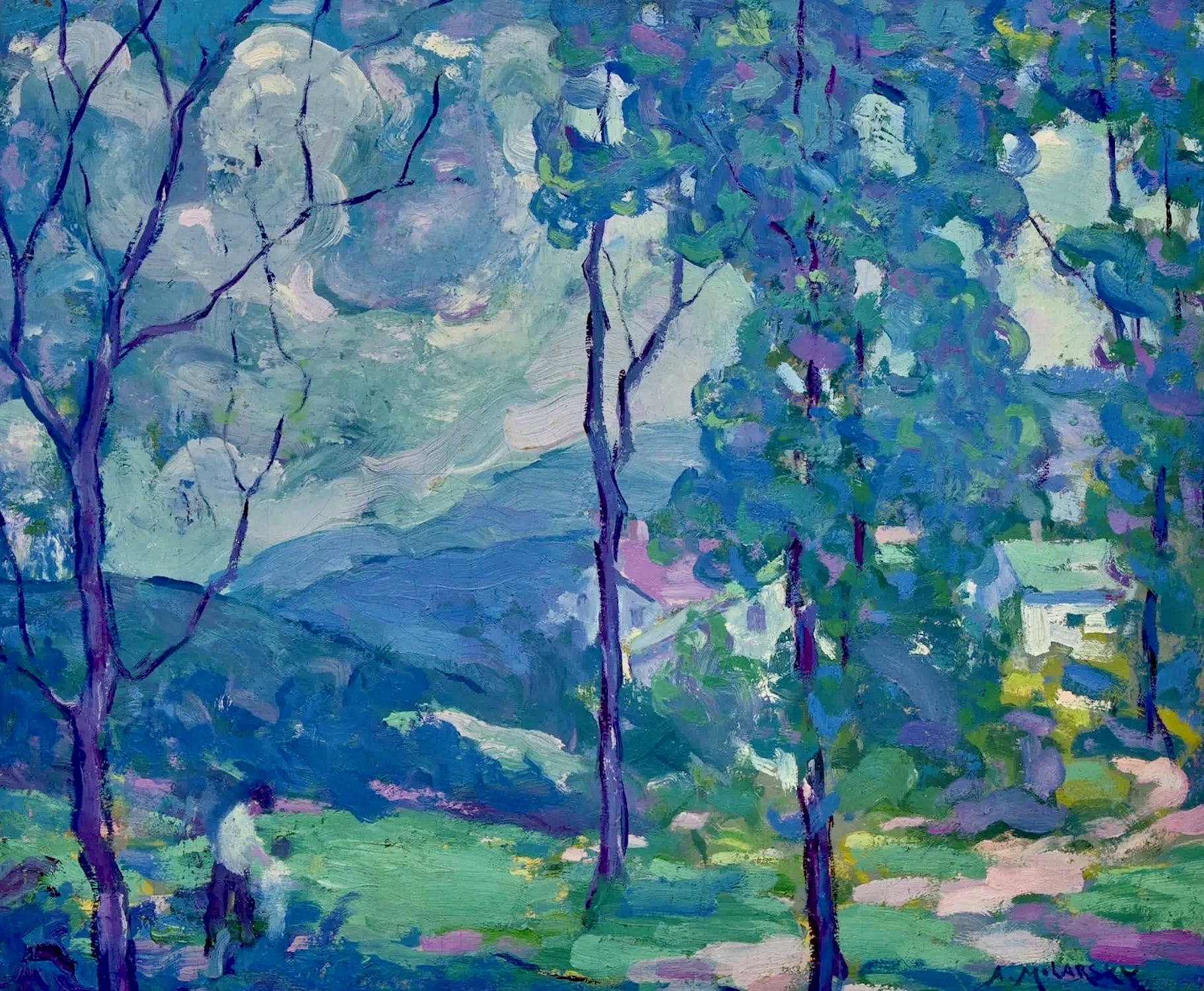
A Gray Day, undated (Private collection)

== Sources ==
- Who's Who in American Art, 1947.
- Who's Who in American Art, 1953.
- Who Was Who in American Art, 1564-1975.
- The Artists Bluebook, Lonnie Pierson Dunbier (editor), 2005.
- Annual Exhibition Record, 1876–1913, Pennsylvania Academy of the Fine Arts.
- The Annual Exhibition Record of the Art Institute of Chicago.
- Annual Exhibition Record, National Academy of Design, 1901–1950.
- Biennial Exhibition Record of the Corcoran Gallery of Art.
- Pennsylvania Academy of the Fine Arts – archives on Abram & Maurice Molarsky.
- Pennsylvania Academy of the Fine Arts – annual exhibition records for Abram Molarsky.
- Abram (aka Abraham) Molarsky's 1905 passport application.
- Who's Who of American Women, 1957 (Sarah Ann Shreve Molarsky).
- The New York Times, May 11, 1928, "Out of Town: Art News."
- The New York Times, March 13, 1934, "National Academy Show opens today."
