= Uhlerstown Historic District =

Historic district in Pennsylvania, United States

- U.S. National Register of Historic Places
- U.S. Historic district
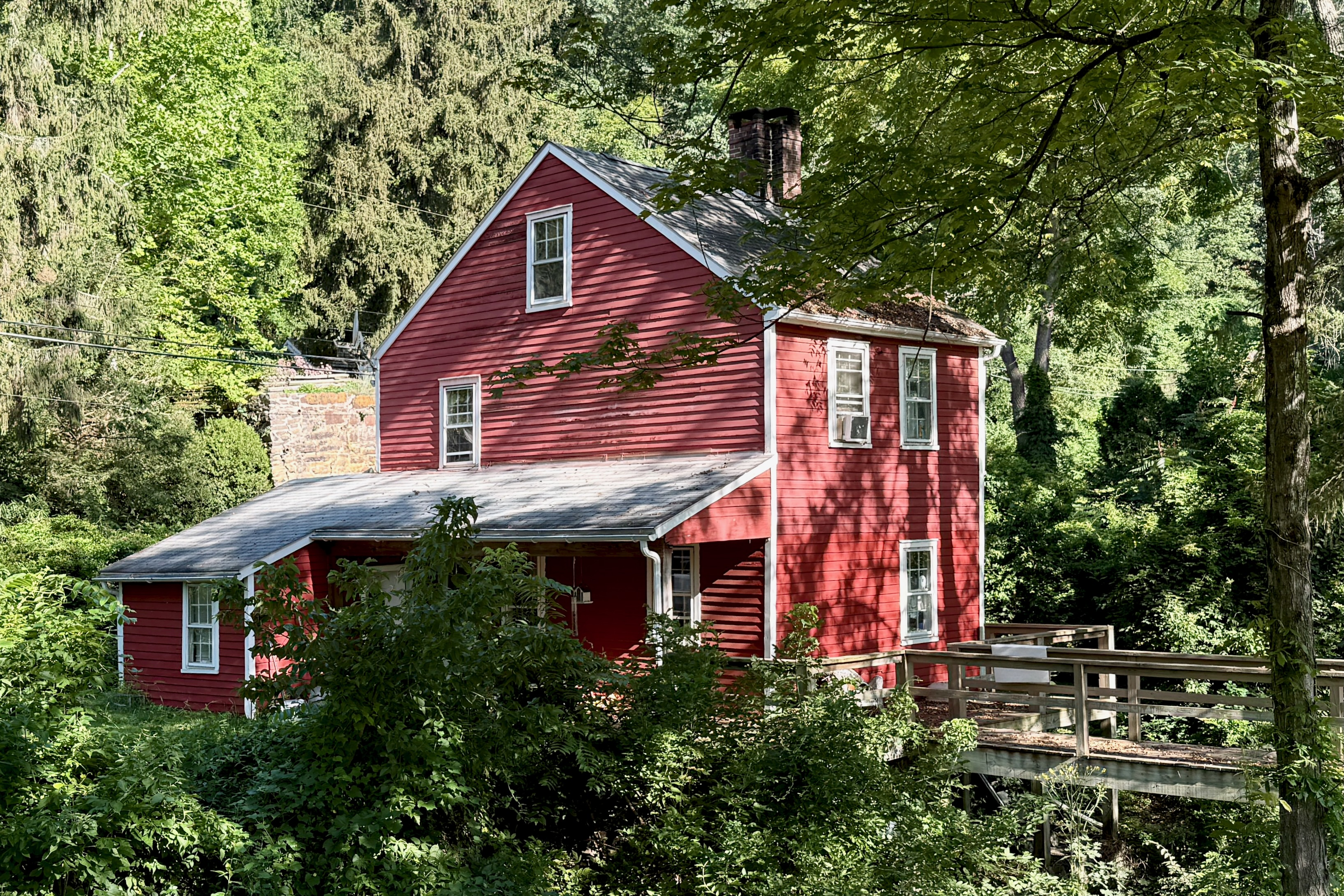
- Lock tender's house for lock 18 of the Delaware Canal

- Location within Pennsylvania Location within the United States
- Location: Roughly bounded by the Delaware River, Jugtown Hill Road, and the Delaware Canal, Tinicum Township, Uhlerstown, Pennsylvania
- Coordinates: 40°31′44″N 75°04′20″W
- Area: 240 acres (97 ha)
- NRHP reference No.: 94000517
- Added to NRHP: May 26, 1994

The Uhlerstown Historic District, also known as Uhlerstown Village and Rural Historic District, is a national historic district that is located in and around Uhlerstown, Bucks County, Pennsylvania.

It was added to the National Register of Historic Places on May 26, 1994, for its significance in architecture, commerce, and transportation.

== History and architectural features ==
This district encompasses sixty-three contributing buildings, four contributing sites, and sixteen contributing structures that are located along the Delaware Division of the Pennsylvania Canal and centered on the village of Uhlerstown.

Notable buildings and structures include a covered bridge, the Michael Uhler house, a stone hotel, Redman's Hall, a lock tender's house, a feed mill, a general store, Uhler's old store and post office, a boat building shop, lime kilns, and several mule barns.

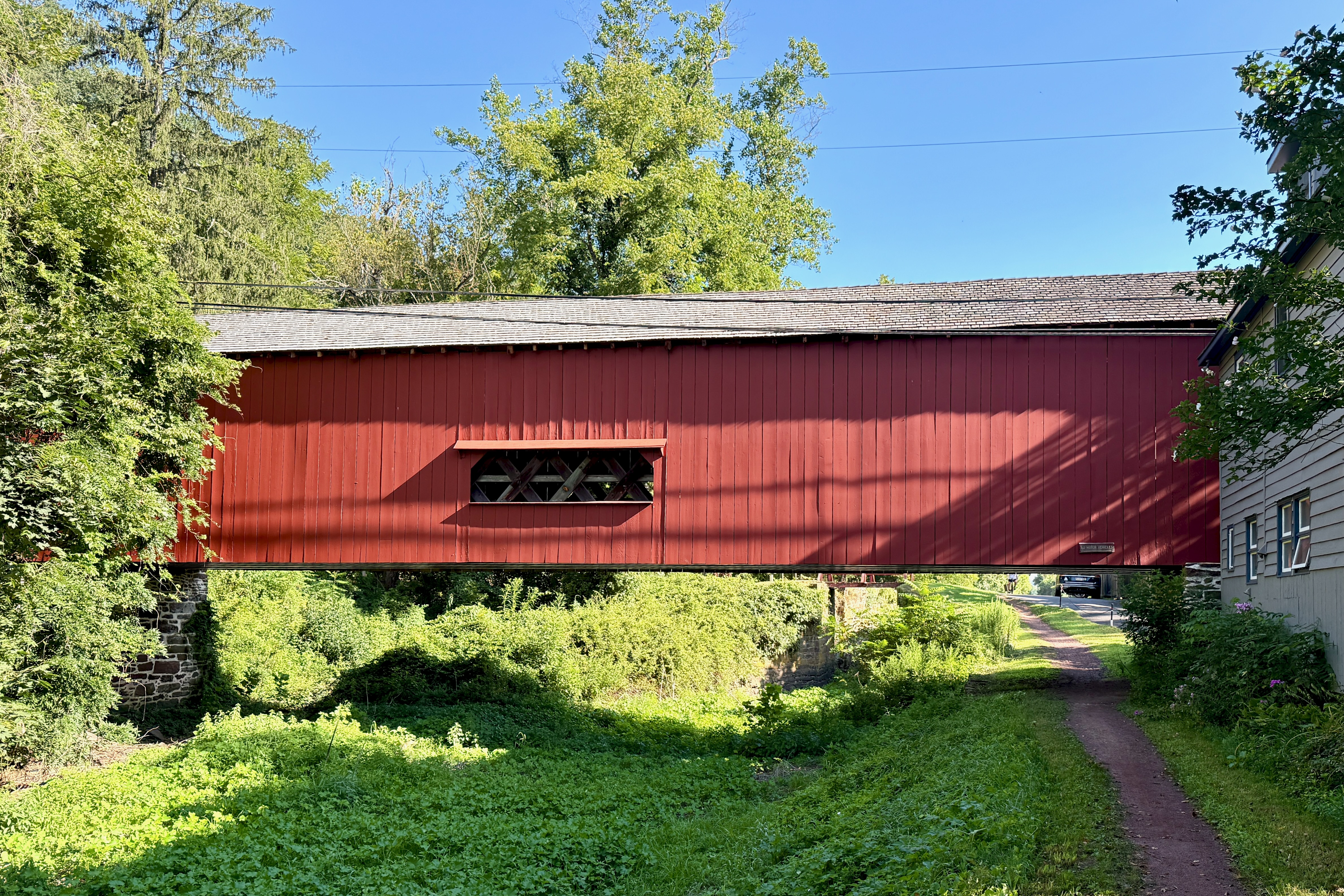
Uhlerstown Covered Bridge spanning the Delaware Canal

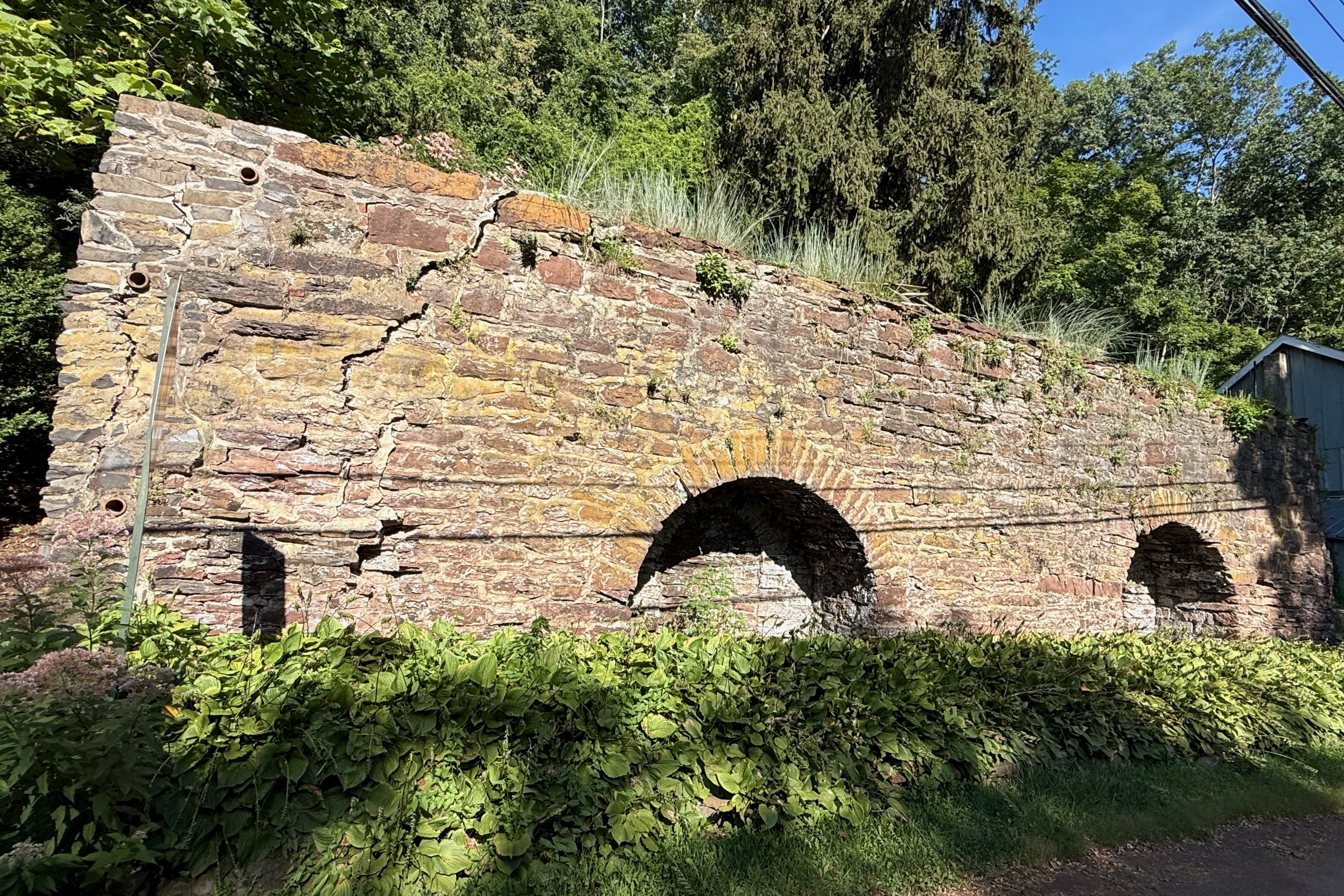
Lime kilns

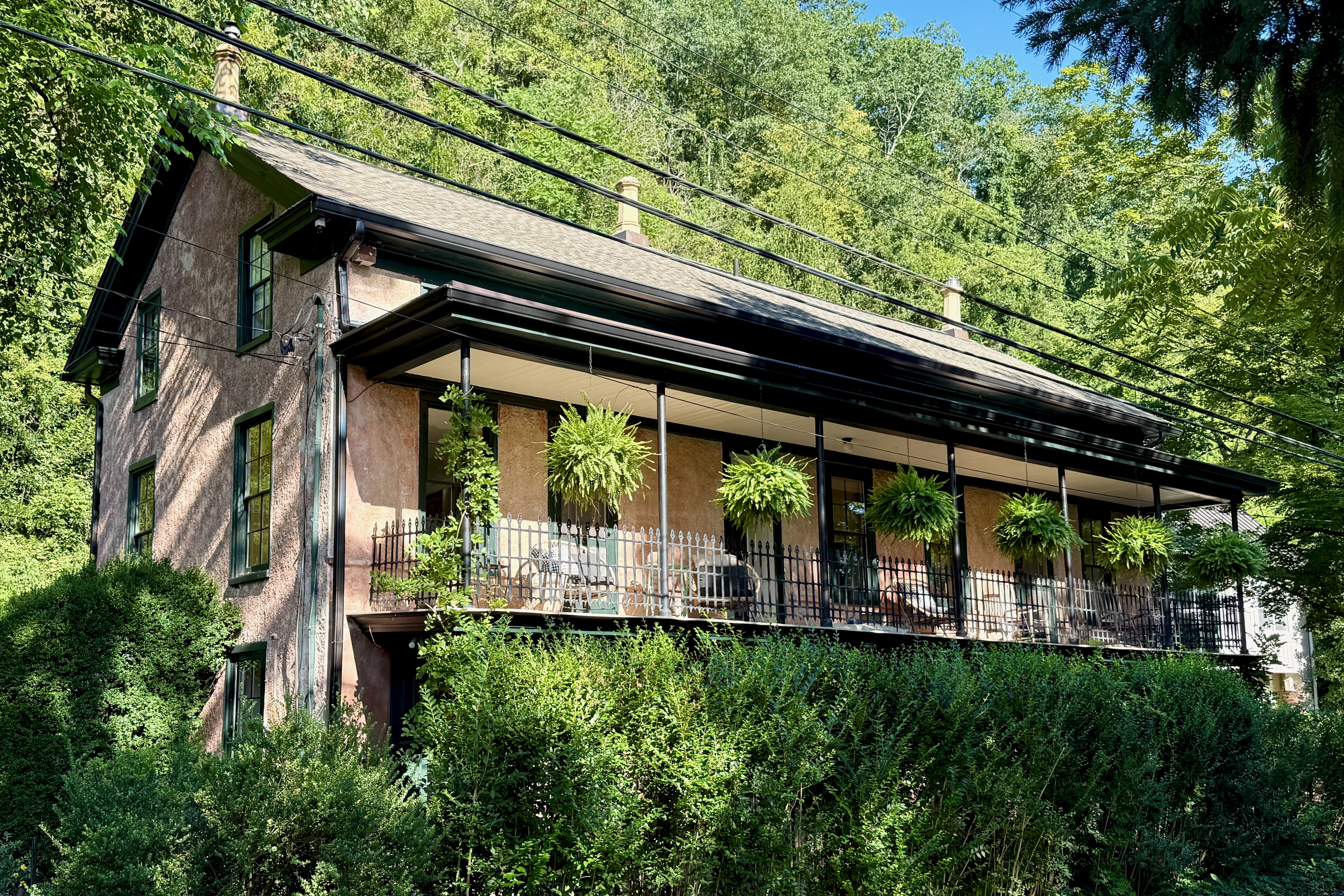
Stone hotel

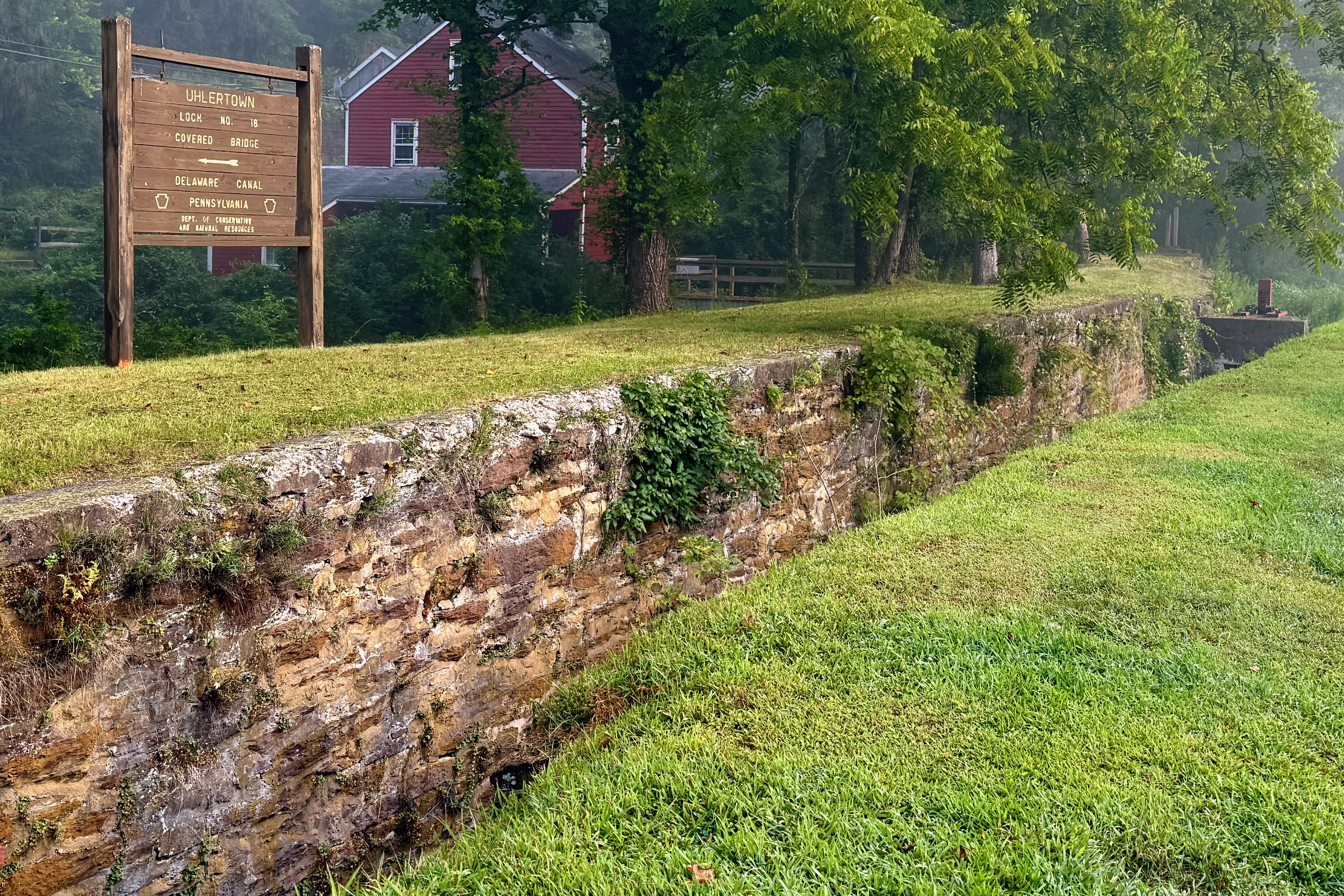
Lock 18 of the Delaware Canal
