= Frenchtown, New Jersey =

Borough in Hunterdon County, New Jersey, US

- Borough
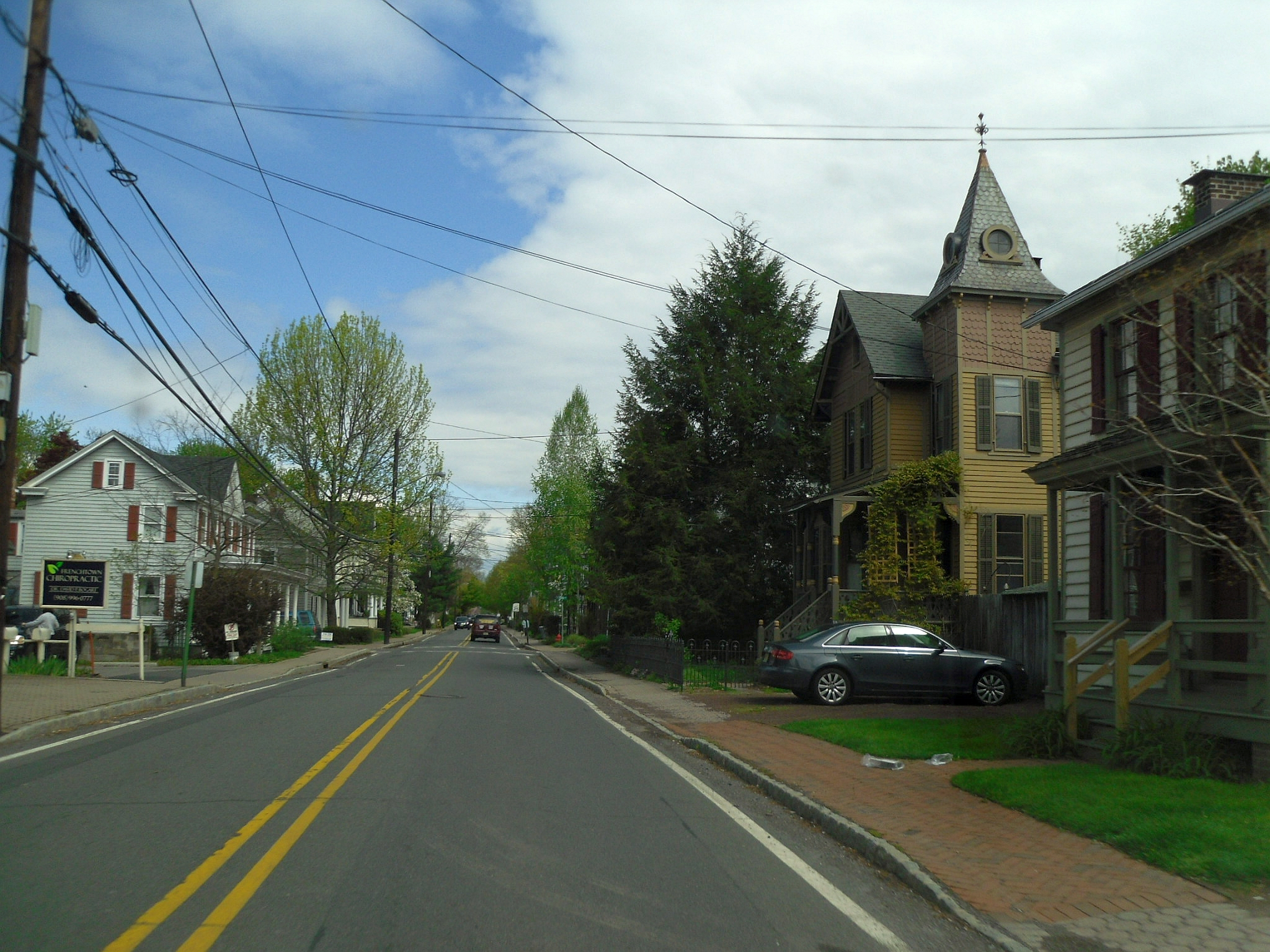
- Harrison Street in Frenchtown

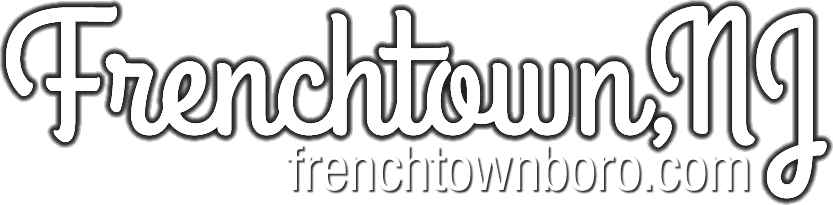
- wordmark

- Location of Frenchtown in Hunterdon County highlighted in red (left). Inset map: Location of Hunterdon County in New Jersey highlighted in orange (right).

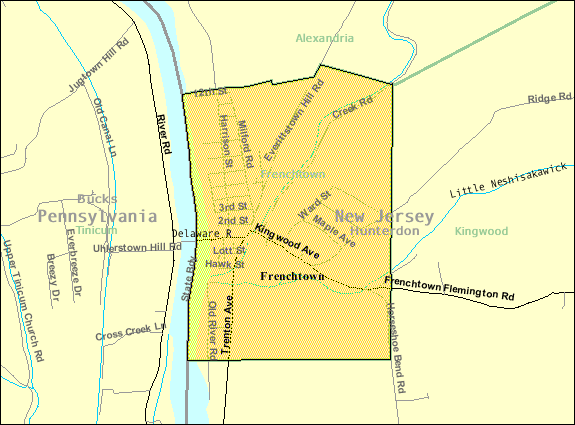
- Census Bureau map of Frenchtown, New Jersey

- Location in Hunterdon County Location in New Jersey Location in the United States
- Coordinates: 40.530537°N 75.052846°W
- Country: United States
- State: New Jersey
- County: Hunterdon
- Incorporated: April 4, 1867

Government
  - Type: Borough
  - Body: Borough Council
  - Mayor: Brad Myhre (R, term ends December 31, 2023)
  - Municipal clerk: Brenda S. Shepherd

Area
  - Total: 1.23 sq mi (3.18 km^{2})
  - Land: 1.13 sq mi (2.92 km^{2})
  - Water: 0.10 sq mi (0.26 km^{2}) 8.05%
  - Rank: 481st of 565 in state 20th of 26 in county
- Elevation: 220 ft (67 m)

Population (2020)
  - Total: 1,370
  - Estimate (2023): 1,472
  - Rank: 519th of 565 in state 22nd of 26 in county
  - Density: 1,214.2/sq mi (468.8/km^{2})
  - Rank: 359th of 565 in state 6th of 26 in county
- Time zone: UTC−05:00 (Eastern (EST))
  - Summer (DST): UTC−04:00 (Eastern (EDT))
- ZIP Code: 08825
- Area code: 908
- FIPS code: 3401925350
- GNIS feature ID: 0885227
- Website: www.frenchtownboro.com

Frenchtown is a borough in Hunterdon County, in the U.S. state of New Jersey. Frenchtown is located along the banks of the Delaware River on the Hunterdon Plateau, 32 miles (51 km) northwest of the state capital of Trenton. As of the 2020 United States census, the borough's population was 1,370, a decrease of three people (−0.2%) from the 2010 census count of 1,373, which in turn reflected a decline of 115 (−7.7%) from the 1,488 counted in the 2000 census.

== History ==
=== Naming Frenchtown ===
Various names have been applied to this settlement after the many ferry operators residing on both sides of the river. The community had variously been known as Alexandriaville, Sunbeam and Frenchtown over the years. The borough was formed by an Incorporation act of the New Jersey Legislature on April 4, 1867, from portions of Alexandria Township. Additional territory was acquired from Kingwood Township in 1876.

=== Bridges ===
The first bridge across the Delaware at Frenchtown was a six-span covered wooden bridge built in 1841 on the five piers that still stand today, and the community became a gateway to Pennsylvania. The present day steel truss Uhlerstown-Frenchtown Bridge is a free Delaware River Joint Toll Bridge Commission bridge over the Delaware River connecting Frenchtown to Uhlerstown, Bucks County, Pennsylvania.

=== Lenape and early European settlers ===
The Lenape Native Americans had populated the area until they were fully supplanted by European settlement around 1750. About 1725, a group of French Huguenot refugees settled in Hunterdon County. Originally from the Picardy region of France, they had fled after the revocation of the Edict of Nantes in 1685 when the King began persecution of non Catholics in France. One notable settler was Luther Calvin, a landowner and ferry operator who also bought a Hotel on Everittstown Road. Calvin also served as a 1st Lieutenant of the Associated Companies in 1756 during the French and Indian War. In 1757, three joint owners of a tract purchased from the West Jersey Land Society began laying out streets and building lots at what was then known as Calvin's Ferry. The developing town was to be called "Alexandria" in honor of William Alexander, Lord Stirling, one of the three owners. In 1776, the three sold the settlement to Thomas Lowrey, a Flemington speculator. In 1794, Lowrey sold the tract to Paul Henri Mallet-Prevost, a Swiss fugitive from the French Revolution. He and other early settlers were French speaking, leading some to begin calling the settlement "Frenchtown."

=== The canal, railroad, and industry ===
Lambertville grew substantially in the next four decades. A trade in grain and other farm products brought into town developed. Boatmen and river men helped fuel Frenchtown's growth through their buying of cargo and food, and hiring of pilots. In the years after Henri Mallet-Prevost's death, his sons sold off portions of their property and no longer was the town privately owned.

The arrival of the Belvidere Delaware Railroad in 1853 sparked continued growth in Frenchtown. Steam-powered industry became widely developed, and by the 1860s, water powered mills were being converted into larger factories. Around the same time, the town had three major hotels: The Lower Hotel (Present day Frenchtown Inn), The Middle Hotel (no longer existing), and the Upper Hotel (The National Hotel). In 1889, Britton Brothers Big Brick Store, which sold a variety of goods, opened on Bridge Street. The railroad eventually became a branch of the Pennsylvania Railroad. It no longer operates but its tracks are still evident. The Delaware and Raritan Canal had been constructed adjacent to the Delaware River in the 1800s. It was quickly abandoned upon the arrival of the paralleling railroad. Its extant towpaths are now a popular biking and hiking trail from Trenton through Lambertville to Frenchtown and beyond. It is maintained by the State of New Jersey as the Delaware and Raritan State Park Trail.

In the early 20th century, growth was spurred by the arrival of Frenchtown Porcelain Works, the establishment of the Milford plant of the Warren Paper Company, and the rise of the poultry industry.

=== Floods ===
Hurricane Diane in 1955 raised the level of the Delaware River dramatically and flooded the streets of Frenchtown as well as other riverbank towns and caused serious damage to buildings and residences. Frenchtown streets have flooded on occasion due to other hurricanes since 1955.

== Geography ==
According to the United States Census Bureau, the borough had a total area of 1.23 square miles (3.18 km^{2}), including 1.13 square miles (2.92 km^{2}) of land and 0.10 square miles (0.26 km^{2}) of water (8.05%).

Frenchtown borders the municipalities of Alexandria Township and Kingwood Township in Hunterdon County; and Tinicum Township in Bucks County, across the Delaware River in the Commonwealth of Pennsylvania.

Frenchtown Solar is a group of three photovoltaic arrays forming one of the largest solar farms in the state covering 110 acres (44.5 ha) with 68,500 solar panels and 20.1 megawatt capacity.

== Demographics ==
Historical population
Census	Pop.	Note	%±
1870	912		—
1880	1,039		13.9%
1890	1,023		−1.5%
1900	1,029		0.6%
1910	984		−4.4%
1920	1,104		12.2%
1930	1,189		7.7%
1940	1,238		4.1%
1950	1,305		5.4%
1960	1,340		2.7%
1970	1,459		8.9%
1980	1,573		7.8%
1990	1,528		−2.9%
2000	1,488		−2.6%
2010	1,373		−7.7%
2020	1,370		−0.2%
2023 (est.)	1,472	▲	7.4%
Population sources: 1880–1920; 1880–1890 1890–1910; 1910–1930 1940–2000; 2000 2010 2020

=== 2010 census ===
The 2010 United States census counted 1,373 people, 596 households, and 366 families in the borough. The population density was 1,087.2 inhabitants per square mile (419.8/km^{2}). There were 656 housing units at an average density of 519.4 per square mile (200.5/km^{2}). The racial makeup was 96.65% (1,327) White, 0.80% (11) Black or African American, 0.36% (5) Native American, 0.95% (13) Asian, 0.00% (0) Pacific Islander, 0.07% (1) from other races, and 1.17% (16) from two or more races. Hispanic or Latino of any race were 5.10% (70) of the population.

Of the 596 households, 26.7% had children under the age of 18; 46.0% were married couples living together; 11.1% had a female householder with no husband present and 38.6% were non-families. Of all households, 31.4% were made up of individuals and 8.7% had someone living alone who was 65 years of age or older. The average household size was 2.27 and the average family size was 2.88.

20.9% of the population were under the age of 18, 6.2% from 18 to 24, 27.3% from 25 to 44, 34.3% from 45 to 64, and 11.3% who were 65 years of age or older. The median age was 42.6 years. For every 100 females, the population had 95.6 males. For every 100 females ages 18 and older there were 95.3 males.

The Census Bureau's 2006–2010 American Community Survey showed that (in 2010 inflation-adjusted dollars) median household income was $62,574 (with a margin of error of +/− $9,339) and the median family income was $76,250 (+/− $12,807). Males had a median income of $62,500 (+/− $7,602) versus $34,886 (+/− $5,656) for females. The per capita income for the borough was $33,966 (+/− $5,364). About 4.9% of families and 8.0% of the population were below the poverty line, including 11.1% of those under age 18 and 4.3% of those age 65 or over.

=== 2000 census ===
As of the 2000 United States census there were 1,488 people, 613 households, and 375 families residing in the borough. The population density was 1,160.7 inhabitants per square mile (448.1/km^{2}). There were 630 housing units at an average density of 491.4 per square mile (189.7/km^{2}). The racial makeup of the borough was 95.97% White, 0.40% African American, 0.20% Native American, 1.21% Asian, 1.34% from other races, and 0.87% from two or more races. Hispanic or Latino of any race were 2.62% of the population.

There were 613 households, out of which 30.7% had children under the age of 18 living with them, 49.9% were married couples living together, 8.5% had a female householder with no husband present, and 38.7% were non-families. 28.9% of all households were made up of individuals, and 7.8% had someone living alone who was 65 years of age or older. The average household size was 2.38 and the average family size was 2.99.

In the borough the population was spread out, with 22.5% under the age of 18, 6.5% from 18 to 24, 35.2% from 25 to 44, 25.9% from 45 to 64, and 9.8% who were 65 years of age or older. The median age was 38 years. For every 100 females, there were 94.0 males. For every 100 females age 18 and over, there were 95.4 males.

The median income for a household in the borough was $52,109, and the median income for a family was $62,132. Males had a median income of $42,321 versus $30,952 for females. The per capita income for the borough was $27,765. About 2.4% of families and 3.3% of the population were below the poverty line, including 4.0% of those under age 18 and 1.4% of those age 65 or over.

== Government ==
=== Local government ===
Frenchtown is governed under the borough form of New Jersey municipal government, the state's most common form, which is used by 218 of the state's 564 municipalities. The governing body is comprised of a mayor and a borough council, with all positions elected at-large on a partisan basis as part of the November general election. A mayor is elected directly by the voters to a four-year term of office. The borough council includes six members elected to serve three-year terms on a staggered basis, with two seats coming up for election each year in a three-year cycle. The borough form of government used by Frenchtown is a "weak mayor / strong council" government in which council members act as the legislative body with the mayor presiding at meetings and voting only in the event of a tie. The mayor can veto ordinances subject to an override by a two-thirds majority vote of the council. The mayor makes committee and liaison assignments for council members, and most appointments are made by the mayor with the advice and consent of the council.

As of 2023, the mayor of Frenchtown is Republican Brad Myhre, whose term of office ends on December 31, 2023. Members of the Borough Council are Council President Michele Liebtag (D, 2023), Stacy Becker (D, 2023), Kandy Ferree (D, 2025), Hannah Opdyke (I, 2025), William O'Brien (D, 2024) and Elaine Warner (D, 2024).

Liz Johnson had resigned from her seat expiring in December 202. In January 2022, the borough council appointed Caroline Scutt to fill the vacant council seat.

In the November 2015 general election, Republican Brad Myhre ran a successful write-in campaign, defeating incumbent Democrat Warren Cooper by 236–185 to win the seat.

Jack Opdyke was appointed in August 2013 to replace Councilman Robb Arent following his resignation

=== Federal, state and county representation ===
Frenchtown is located in the 7th Congressional District and is part of New Jersey's 15th state legislative district.

For the 119th United States Congress, New Jersey's 7th congressional district is represented by Thomas Kean Jr. (R, Westfield). New Jersey is represented in the United States Senate by Democrats Cory Booker (Newark, term ends 2027) and Andy Kim (Moorestown, term ends 2031).

For the 2026–2027 session, the 15th legislative district of the New Jersey Legislature is represented in the State Senate by Shirley Turner (D, Lawrence Township) and in the General Assembly by Verlina Reynolds-Jackson (D, Trenton) and Anthony Verrelli (D, Hopewell Township).

Hunterdon County is governed by a Board of County Commissioners comprised of five members who are elected at-large on a partisan basis to serve three-year terms of office on a staggered basis, with either one or two seats up for election each year as part of the November general election. At an annual reorganization meeting held each January, the commissioners select one member to serve as the board's Director and another to serve as Deputy Director, each for a one-year term. As of 2025, Hunterdon County's Commissioners are Director John E. Lanza (R; Raritan Township, 2025), Deputy Director Shaun C. Van Doren (R; Tewksbury Township, 2026), Jeff Kuhl (R; Raritan Township, 2027), Zachary T. Rich (R; West Amwell Township, 2025) and Susan Soloway (R; Franklin Township, 2027).

Constitutional officers elected on a countywide basis are Clerk Mary H. Melfi (R; Flemington, 2026), Sheriff Fredrick W. Brown (R; Alexandria Township, 2025) and Surrogate Heidi Rohrbach (R; Lebanon Township, 2028).

=== Politics ===
As of March 2011, there were a total of 931 registered voters in Frenchtown, of which 289 (31.0%) were registered as Democrats, 270 (29.0%) were registered as Republicans and 370 (39.7%) were registered as Unaffiliated. There were 2 voters registered as either Libertarians or Greens.

Gubernatorial election results for Frenchtown
Year	Republican		Democratic		Third party(ies)	
Year	No.	%	No.	%	No.	%
2025	255	30.32%	580	68.97%	6	0.71%
2021	211	37.08%	345	60.63%	13	2.28%
2017	167	34.50%	311	64.26%	6	1.24%
2013	284	54.93%	221	42.75%	12	2.32%
2009	247	48.91%	209	41.39%	49	9.70%
2005	190	43.08%	225	51.02%	26	5.90%

In the 2012 presidential election, Democrat Barack Obama received 61.6% of the vote (431 cast), ahead of Republican Mitt Romney with 35.7% (250 votes), and other candidates with 2.7% (19 votes), among the 705 ballots cast by the borough's 982 registered voters (5 ballots were spoiled), for a turnout of 71.8%. In the 2008 presidential election, Democrat Barack Obama received 59.6% of the vote (439 cast), ahead of Republican John McCain with 38.3% (282 votes) and other candidates with 1.2% (9 votes), among the 737 ballots cast by the borough's 953 registered voters, for a turnout of 77.3%. In the 2004 presidential election, Democrat John Kerry received 57.1% of the vote (392 ballots cast), outpolling Republican George W. Bush with 42.4% (291 votes) and other candidates with 1.4% (13 votes), among the 686 ballots cast by the borough's 914 registered voters, for a turnout percentage of 75.1.

United States presidential election results for Frenchtown
Year	Republican		Democratic		Third party(ies)	
Year	No.	%	No.	%	No.	%
2024	318	31.74%	642	64.07%	42	4.19%
2020	282	33.06%	556	65.18%	15	1.76%
2016	274	37.43%	422	57.65%	36	4.92%
2012	250	35.71%	431	61.57%	19	2.71%
2008	282	38.63%	439	60.14%	9	1.23%
2004	291	41.81%	392	56.32%	13	1.87%

In the 2013 gubernatorial election, Republican Chris Christie received 54.9% of the vote (284 cast), ahead of Democrat Barbara Buono with 42.7% (221 votes), and other candidates with 2.3% (12 votes), among the 533 ballots cast by the borough's 976 registered voters (16 ballots were spoiled), for a turnout of 54.6%. In the 2009 gubernatorial election, Republican Chris Christie received 48.3% of the vote (247 ballots cast), ahead of Democrat Jon Corzine with 40.9% (209 votes), Independent Chris Daggett with 8.2% (42 votes) and other candidates with 1.4% (7 votes), among the 511 ballots cast by the borough's 943 registered voters, yielding a 54.2% turnout.

United States Senate election results for Frenchtown1
Year	Republican		Democratic		Third party(ies)	
Year	No.	%	No.	%	No.	%
2024	289	31.69%	599	65.68%	24	2.63%
2018	297	41.25%	395	54.86%	28	3.89%
2012	239	36.16%	380	57.49%	42	6.35%
2006	188	41.05%	248	54.15%	22	4.80%

United States Senate election results for Frenchtown2
Year	Republican		Democratic		Third party(ies)	
Year	No.	%	No.	%	No.	%
2020	273	32.81%	542	65.14%	17	2.04%
2014	154	37.20%	253	61.11%	7	1.69%
2013	119	39.02%	183	60.00%	3	0.98%
2008	304	44.97%	339	50.15%	33	4.88%

== Historic district ==
- Frenchtown Historic District
- U.S. National Register of Historic Places
- U.S. Historic district
- New Jersey Register of Historic Places
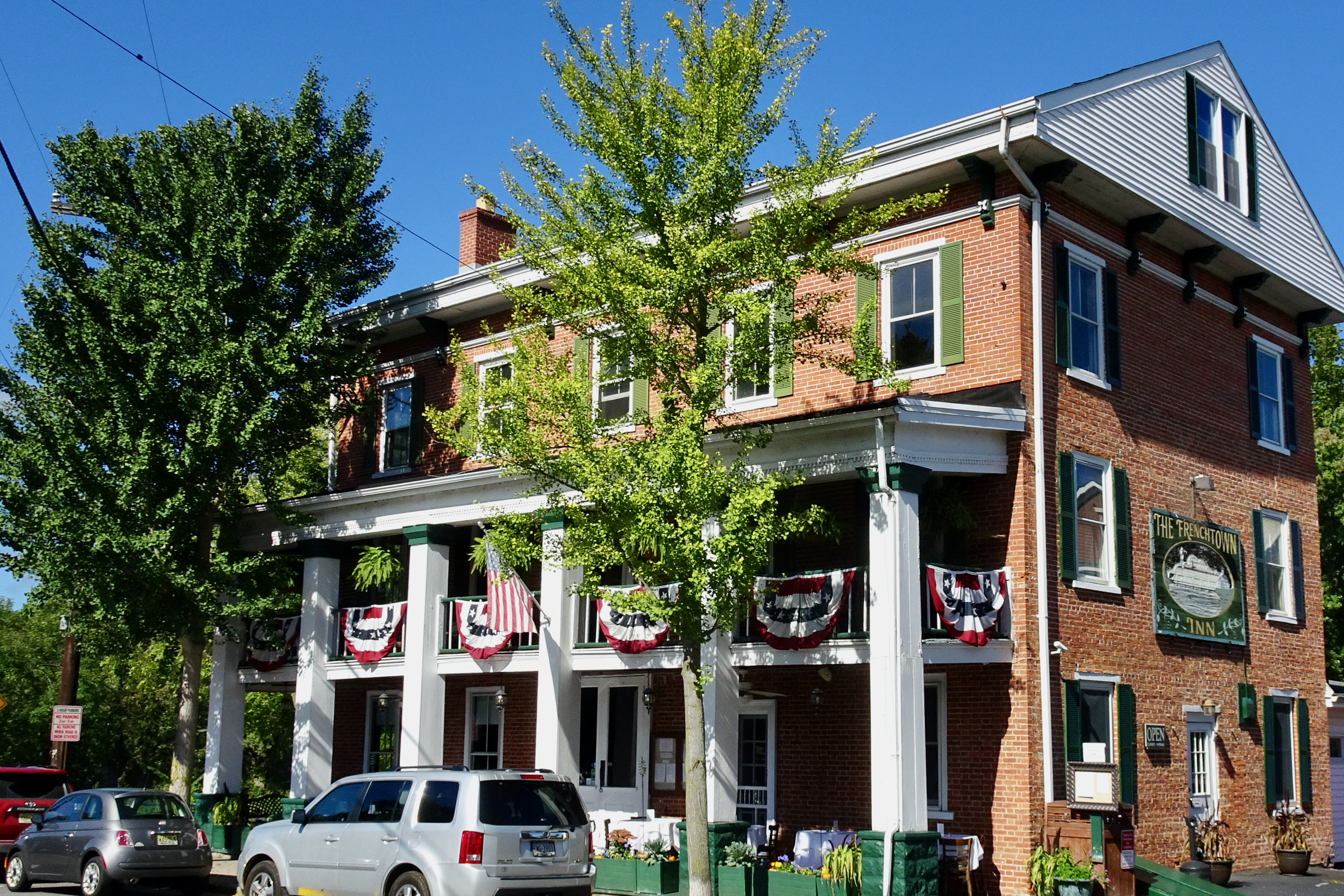
- The Frenchtown Inn
- Location: Bounded by 12th Street, Washington Street, the Delaware River and Nishisakawick Creek
- Area: 100 acres (40 ha)
- Architectural style: Italianate, Greek Revival, Federal
- NRHP reference No.: 94000438
- NJRHP No.: 1591

Significant dates
- Added to NRHP: May 19, 1994
- Designated NJRHP: March 14, 1994

The Frenchtown Historic District is a 100-acre (40 ha) historic district encompassing the community. It was added to the National Register of Historic Places on May 19, 1994, for its significance in architecture, commerce, community planning and development, and transportation from 1795 to 1931. The district includes 401 contributing buildings, one contributing structure, and one contributing site. It includes the Uhlerstown–Frenchtown Bridge, which crosses the Delaware River.

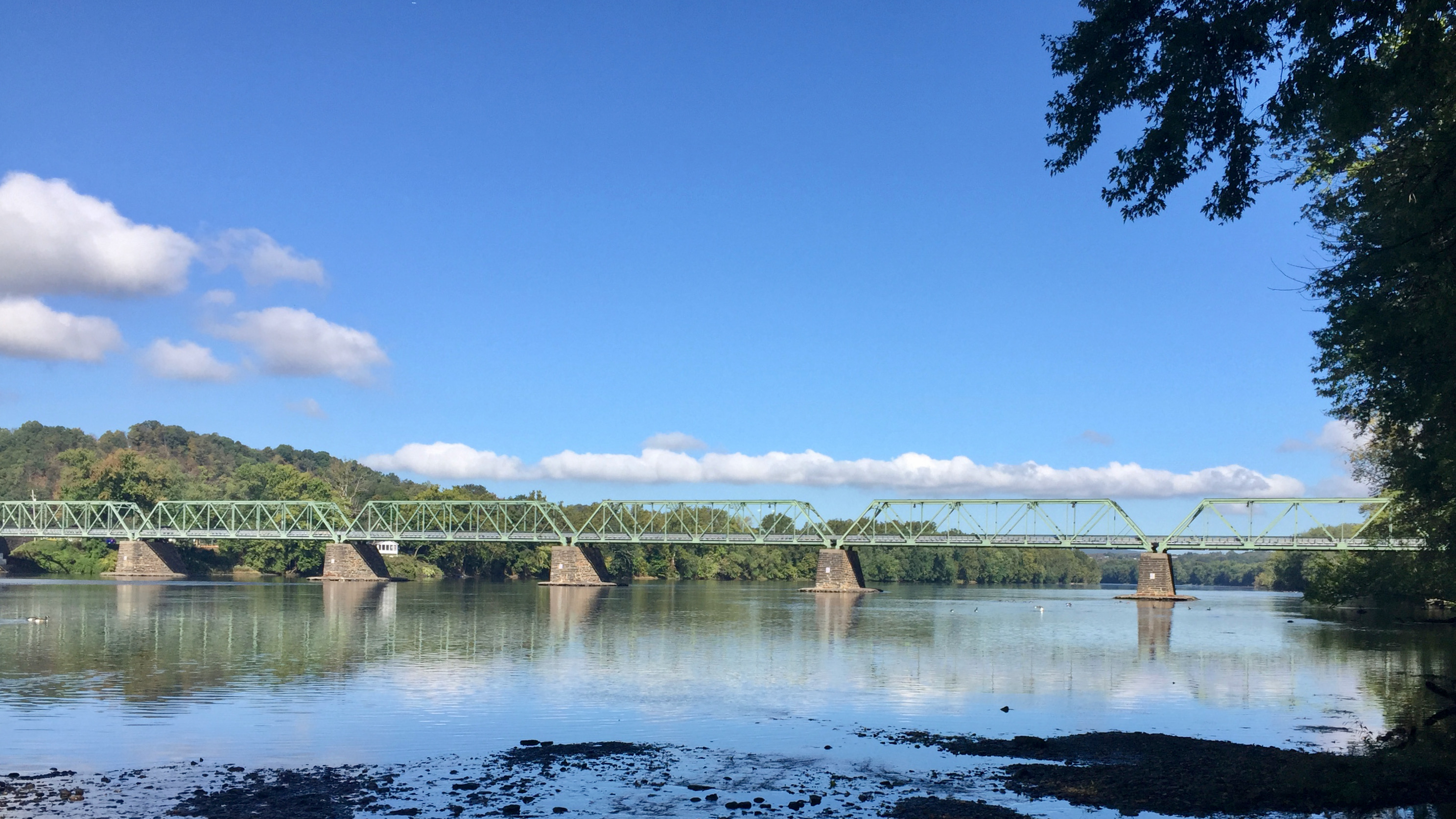
Uhlerstown–Frenchtown Bridge crossing the Delaware River

The Frenchtown Inn was built in 1832 and features Greek Revival architecture. The Frenchtown Station for the Belvidere Delaware Railroad was built c. 1853 and is now the Bridge Cafe. The Nathaniel Shurtz house was built c. 1865 with Italianate style. The Oddfellows Building was built in 1879 with Romanesque Revival architecture.

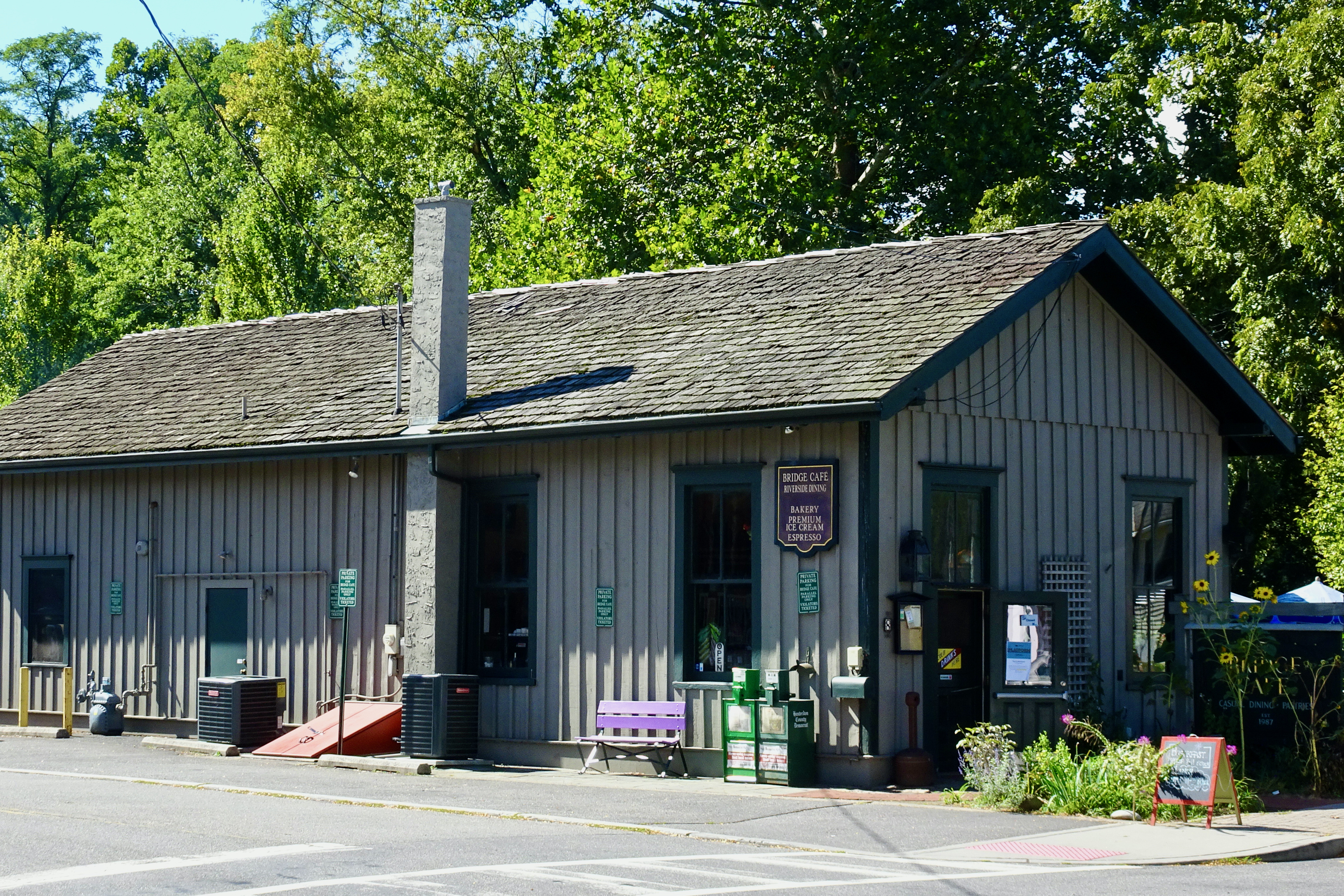
Former Frenchtown Station on the Belvidere Delaware Railroad

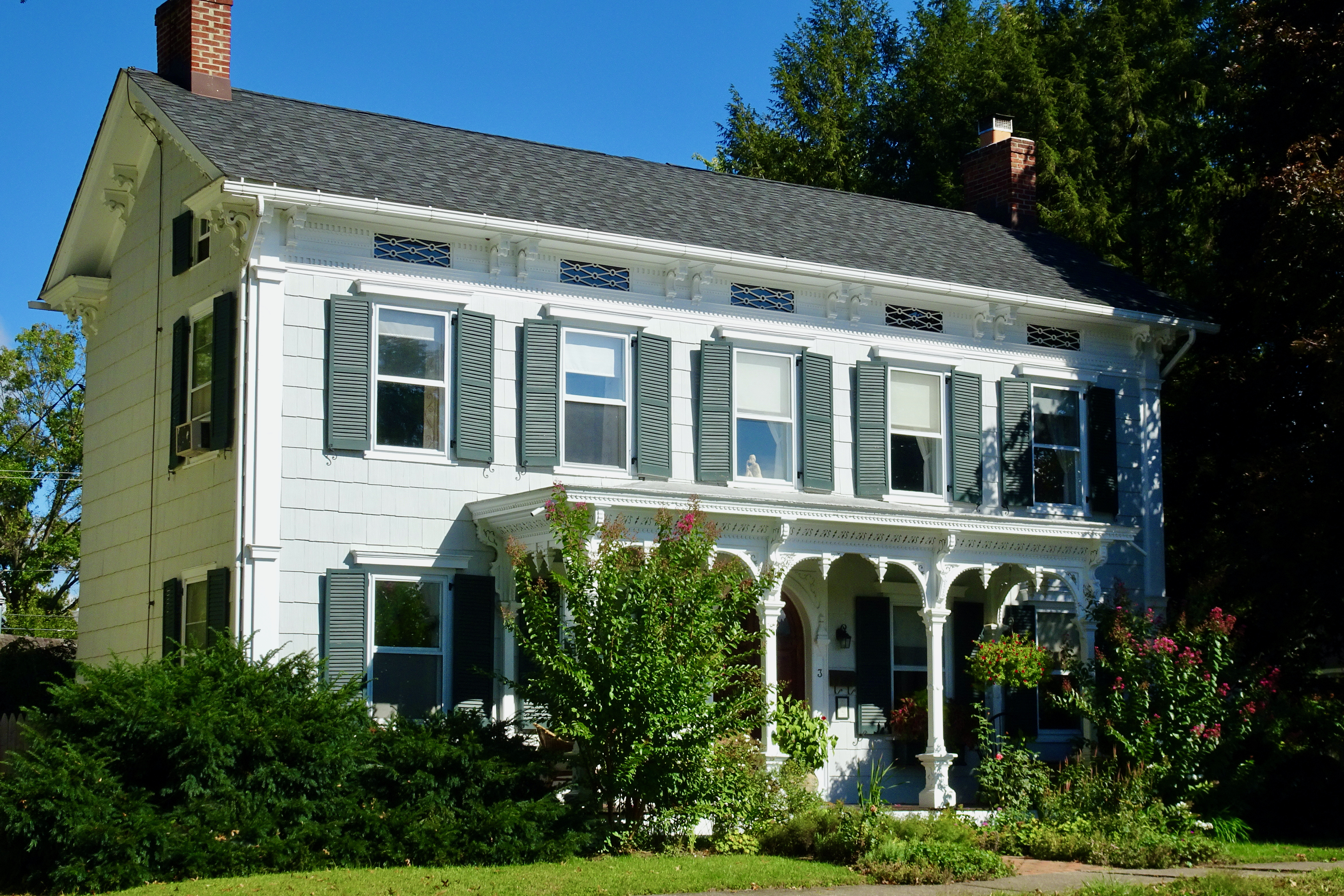
Nathaniel Shurtz house

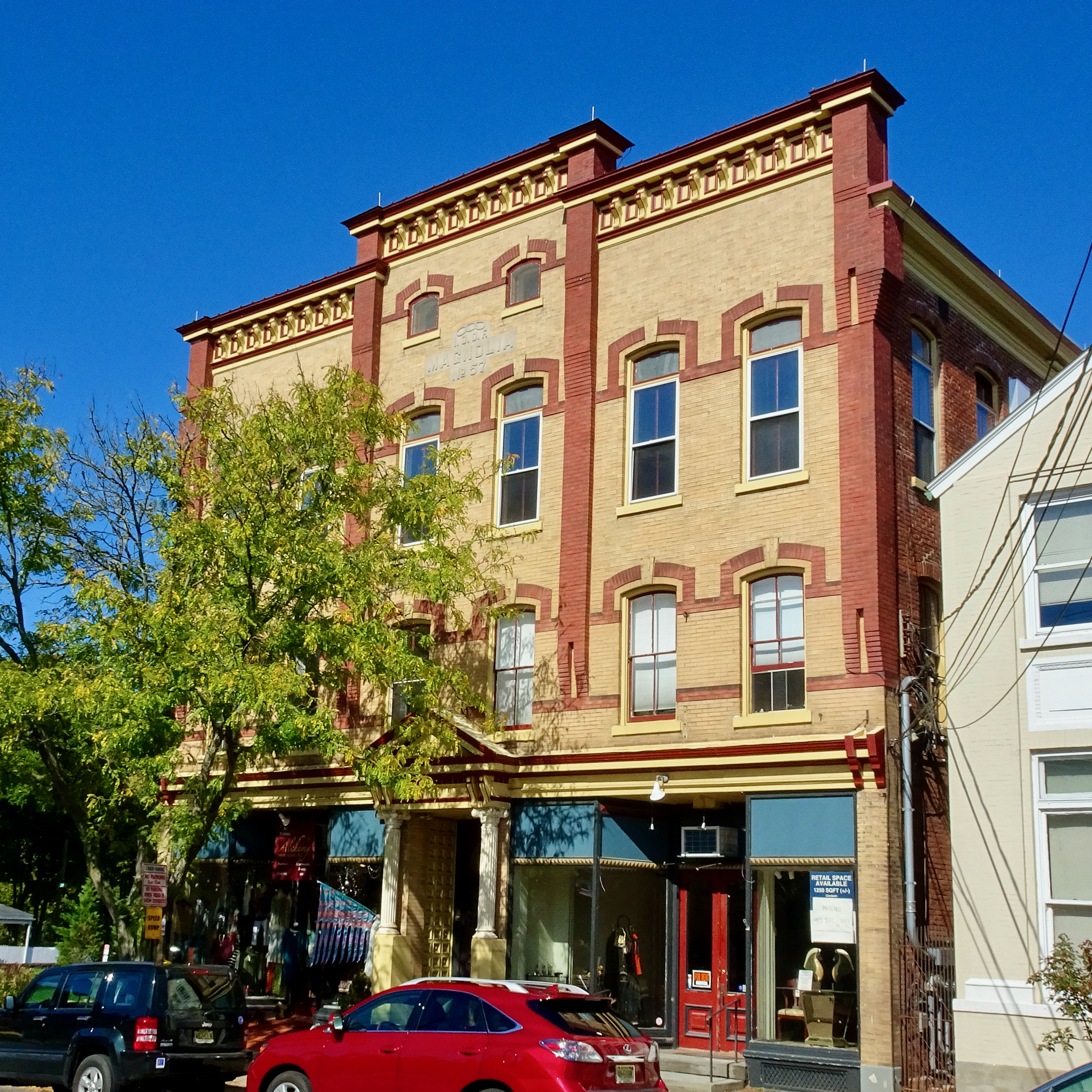
Oddfellows Building

== Education ==
The Frenchtown School District serves public school students in pre-kindergarten through eighth grade at Edith Ort Thomas Elementary School. As of the 2023–24 school year, the district, comprised of one school, had an enrollment of 104 students and 15.6 classroom teachers (on an FTE basis), for a student–teacher ratio of 6.7:1. In the 2016–2017 school year, Frenchtown was tied for the 18th-smallest enrollment of any school district in the state, with 129 students.

Public school students in ninth through twelfth grades attend the Delaware Valley Regional High School in Frenchtown, which serves students in western Hunterdon County from Alexandria, Holland and Kingwood Townships along with the boroughs of Frenchtown and Milford. As of the 2023–24 school year, the high school had an enrollment of 692 students and 61.5 classroom teachers (on an FTE basis), for a student–teacher ratio of 11.3:1. The seats on the high school district's nine-member board of education are allocated based on population, with one seat allocated to Frenchtown.

Eighth grade students from all of Hunterdon County are eligible to apply to attend the high school programs offered by the Hunterdon County Vocational School District, a county-wide vocational school district that offers career and technical education at its campuses in Raritan Township and at programs sited at local high schools, with no tuition charged to students for attendance.

== Transportation ==
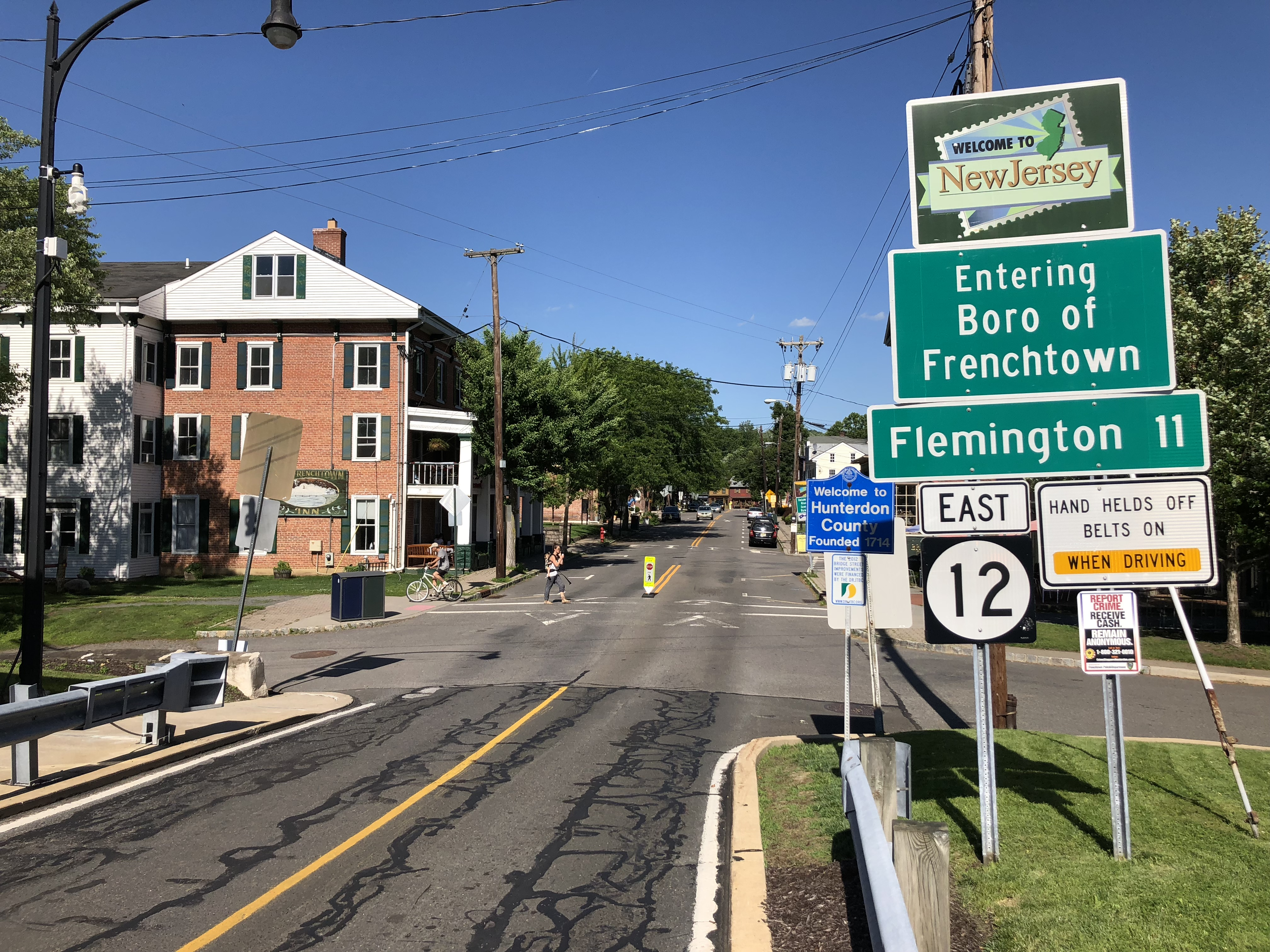
View east at the west end of Route 12 in Frenchtown

As of May 2010, the borough had a total of 10.32 miles (16.61 km) of roadways, of which 7.50 miles (12.07 km) were maintained by the municipality, 2.36 miles (3.80 km) by Hunterdon County and 0.34 miles (0.55 km) by the New Jersey Department of Transportation and 0.12 miles (0.19 km) by the Delaware River Joint Toll Bridge Commission.

The borough is traversed by several roadways. Frenchtown is the northern terminus of Route 29, the western terminus of Route 12 and the southern terminus of Route 513.

The Uhlerstown–Frenchtown Bridge is a toll-free bridge over the Delaware River, owned and operated by the Delaware River Joint Toll Bridge Commission, connecting New Jersey Route 12 in Frenchtown with Pennsylvania Route 32 in Uhlerstown, located in Tinicum Township, Bucks County, Pennsylvania. Reconstructed in 1931, the bridge is a six-span Warren truss that extends 950 feet (290 m).

== Civic events ==
Frenchtown holds La Fete Nationale on Bastille Day in July with a different theme each year related to borough's "French heritage and flavor".

== Notable people ==
People who were born in, residents of, or otherwise closely associated with Frenchtown include:

- James Agee (1909–1955), author, editor and poet who lived in Frenchtown (on Second Street in what is now the police station) with second wife Alma from 1938 to 1939 and wrote Let Us Now Praise Famous Men during that time
- Elizabeth Gilbert (born 1969), author of Eat, Pray, Love
- Shea Hembrey (born 1974), conceptual artist
- Lois Hunt (1925–2009), soprano opera singer who toured for decades with baritone Earl Wrightson
- Anne Kursinski (born 1959), top show jumping competitor
- Harvey Spencer Lewis (1883–1939), Rosicrucian author, occultist and mystic
- J. Linus McAtee (1897–1963), thoroughbred horse racing jockey
- Barb Morrison (born 1967), songwriter and record producer
- Billy Pauch (born 1957), race car driver
- Anna Pump (1934–2015), chef, cookbook author, baker, and innkeeper famous for her bakery in The Hamptons, Loaves & Fishes
- Nathanael West (1903–1940), novelist, screenwriter and satirist, author of Miss Lonelyhearts and The Day of the Locust, boarded at the Frenchtown Inn during the 1930s

== See also ==
- Hunterdon Plateau
- National Register of Historic Places listings in Hunterdon County, New Jersey
