= Uhlerstown–Frenchtown Bridge =

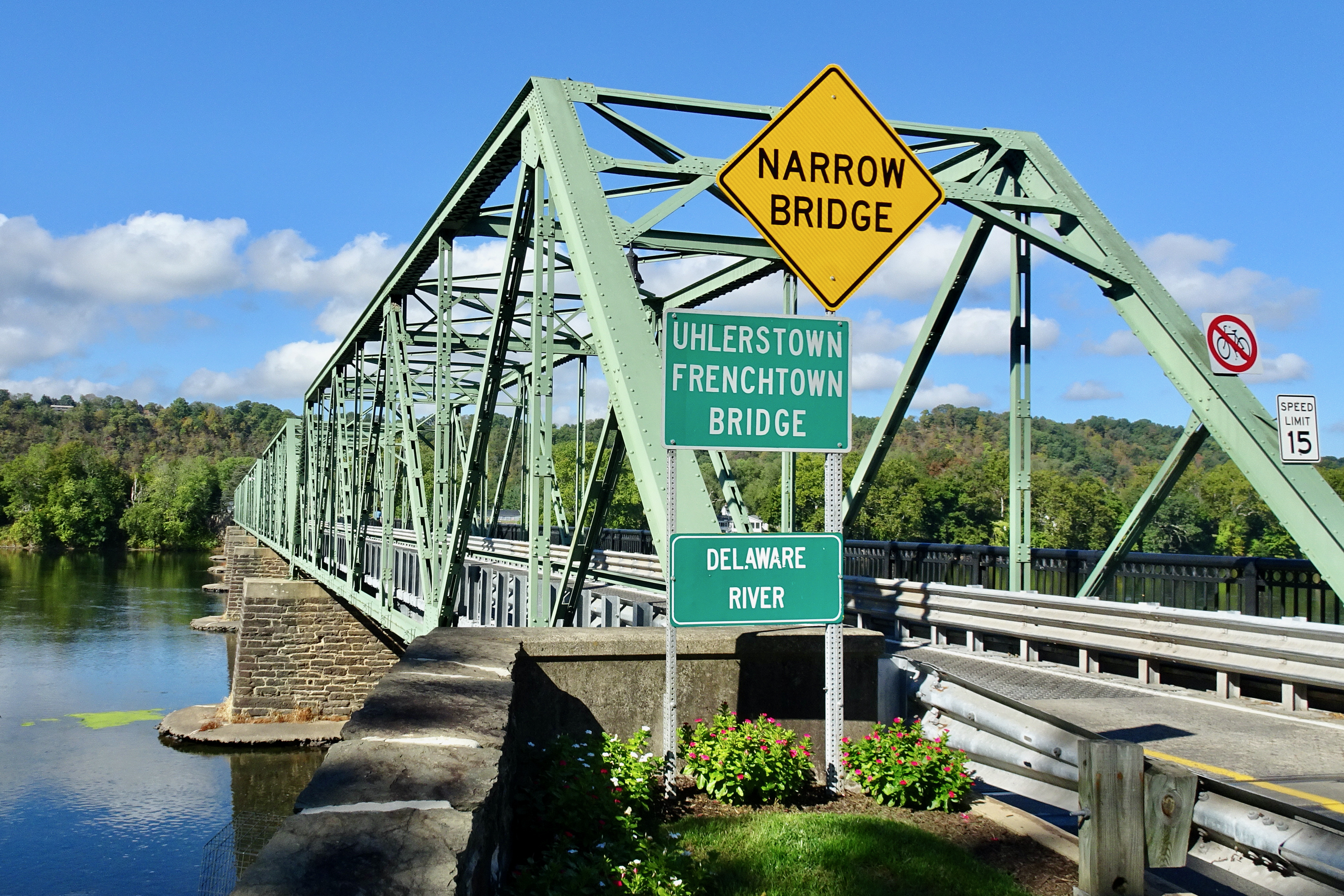
- View from Frenchtown
- Coordinates: 40°31′34″N 75°3′54″W
- Carries: Route 12
- Crosses: Delaware River
- Locale: Frenchtown, New Jersey and Uhlerstown, Pennsylvania
- Maintained by: Delaware River Joint Toll Bridge Commission

Characteristics
- Design: Six span Warren truss
- Width: 16'-6"
- Load limit: 15 tons
- Clearance above: 12'-6"

History
- Opened: October 10, 1931

Statistics
- Daily traffic: 4,400
- Toll: None
- Delaware River Bridge
- U.S. Historic district – Contributing property
- Part of: Frenchtown Historic District (ID94000438)
- Designated CP: May 19, 1994

Location
- Interactive map of Uhlerstown–Frenchtown Bridge

The Uhlerstown–Frenchtown Bridge is a free bridge over the Delaware River, owned and operated by the Delaware River Joint Toll Bridge Commission. The bridge connects New Jersey Route 12 in Frenchtown of Hunterdon County, New Jersey with Pennsylvania Route 32 in Uhlerstown of Bucks County, Pennsylvania. The existing bridge has a roadway width of 16.5 feet (5.0 m). A pedestrian walkway is supported on steel cantilever brackets. The bridge maintains a 15-mile-per-hour (24 km/h) speed limit.

It was added to the National Register of Historic Places on May 19, 1994, as part of the Frenchtown Historic District.

== History ==
The community known as Frenchtown, New Jersey, was once intended to be called Alexandria, after one of its original owners and developers. The land was sold in 1776 to one Thomas Lowrey, a speculator from nearby Flemington who built a gristmill and a sawmill. Eventually it took its name in honor of Paul Henri Mallet-Prevost, a Swiss fugitive from the French Revolution who purchased the land in 1794. Mallet-Prevost spoke French and the town became known as French's Town, then Frenchtown. The settlement across the river in Pennsylvania was at that time called Mexico although, it would change its name in 1871 in honor of its first postmaster, Michael Uhler, a significant figure in the commercial and industrial development of the town. In 1829, construction began on the Delaware Division of the Pennsylvania Canal which ran from Easton, Pennsylvania south to Bristol, Pennsylvania. The canal closely paralleled the river, running through Mexico and supporting commerce well on the Pennsylvania side of the river. On the opposite shore, by 1855, the Belvidere and Delaware Railroad would allow fast transportation north and south between Trenton, New Jersey and Belvidere, New Jersey, north of Phillipsburg. Since at least 1690, transportation east–west across the Delaware had been served by ferries. Both towns were developing in manufacturing and commerce and would soon outgrow the capacity of a ferry service. By 1840 plans were being made to construct a bridge across the river and the Alexandria Bridge Company was soon established.

=== Early bridges ===
The first bridge was a six span, wooden, covered bridge built upon five stone and masonry piers and two abutments. The six spans totalled more than one thousand feet in length and the bridge, completed in about one year at a total cost of $20,000, opened in the early part of 1844. The worst recorded flood at that time had occurred in 1841, thus sparing the new bridge possible catastrophe. It sustained some repairable superstructure damage in the flood of 1862. It likewise survived near disaster on June 29, 1878, when the Bridge Street business district of Frenchtown was largely consumed by fire.

The covered bridge was less fortunate on October 10, 1903, when another major flood raced downstream, taking with it the two spans nearest the Jersey shore. Within a year, the missing spans were rebuilt as steel trusses and the bridge stood as a combined wood and steel structure until 1931.

=== Current bridge ===
The Joint Bridge Commission purchased the entire privately owned toll bridge for $45,000 in 1929, and rebuilt the bridge in 1931 saving but the original piers and abutments which were recapped and repointed. The new bridge is a six span Warren truss of through design and riveted steel construction. It is 950 feet 10 inches in length, and 19'-6" in width, originally had sidewalks on either side and, contains 534 tons of steel. The trusses are 22 ft high. The cost of this reconstruction was $96,410.65.

In 1949, the wood floor was replaced with an open grid steel deck and a single 3 ft 9 in wide cantilevered sidewalk was installed on the upstream (north) side.

The flood of 1955 stands as one of the most destructive in Philadelphia metropolitan area history. Several bridges were washed out in the deluge. While four inches of water flowed over the deck of the Uhlerstown-Frenchtown bridge and it received some damage from floating debris, the damage was not serious and the bridge did not need to be closed while repairs were made.

The weight limit for vehicles traveling across the bridge was reduced from 15 tons down to 5 in May 2000. A 2001 rehab project included repainting the bridge, replacing the floor and sidewalk, and installation of new lighting and guard rails. Weekday closures occurred while lead paint was removed from the bridge in a manner which would not pollute the river below and the bridge stands today in very good condition.

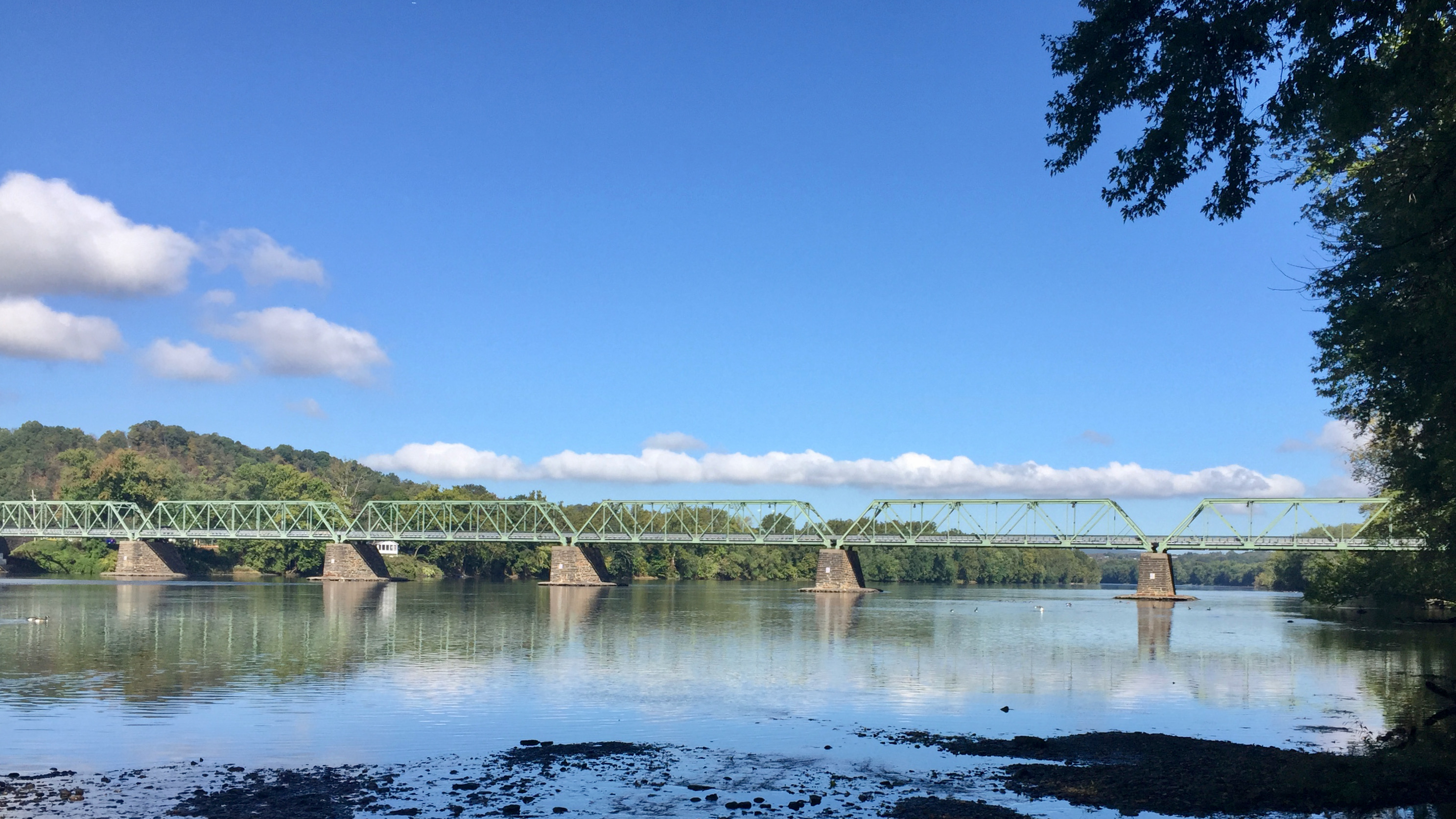
View from the shore in Frenchtown

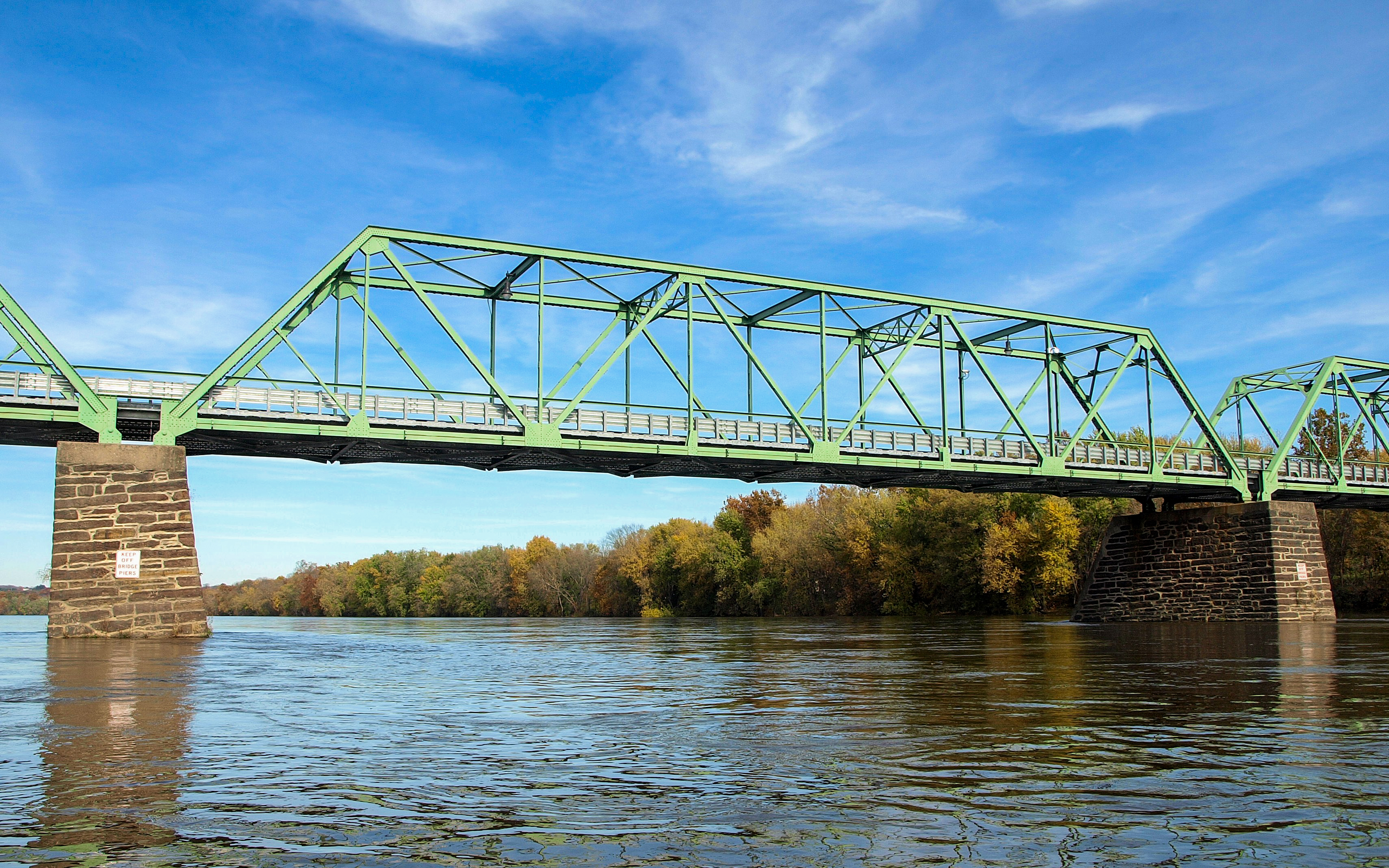
View from the river

== See also ==
- List of crossings of the Delaware River
- List of bridges on the National Register of Historic Places in New Jersey

== Sources ==
- Uhlerstown-Frenchtown Bridge (Uhlerstown/Frenchtown, 1931), accessed November 1, 2009
- Photographs of Delaware River Bridges
- Uhlerstown-Frenchtown Toll Supported Bridge, accessed September 20, 2018
- , accessed November 1, 2009
- Delaware River Bridges in New Jersey, accessed November 2, 2009
