= New Jersey Route 12 =

State highway in Hunterdon County, New Jersey, US

Route 12

Route information
- Maintained by NJDOT, Hunterdon County, and DRJTBC
- Length: 11.69 mi (18.81 km)
- Existed: 1927–present

Major junctions
- West end: Uhlerstown–Frenchtown Bridge at the Pennsylvania state line
- Route 29 in Frenchtown; CR 513 in Frenchtown; CR 519 in Kingwood Township; CR 579 in Delaware / Raritan Township; CR 523 in Raritan Township
- East end: US 202 / Route 31 in Flemington

Location
- Country: United States
- State: New Jersey
- Counties: Hunterdon

Highway system
- New Jersey State Highway Routes; Interstate; US; State; Scenic Byways
← Route 11	→ Route 13

Route 12 is a state highway located in Hunterdon County, New Jersey, United States. It runs 11.69 mi (18.81 km) from the Uhlerstown–Frenchtown Bridge at the Delaware River border with Pennsylvania in Frenchtown east to an intersection with U.S. Route 202 (US 202) and Route 31 at the Flemington Circle in Flemington. The route is mostly a two-lane undivided road that passes through rural areas of woodland and farmland. It intersects Route 29 and County Route 513 (CR 513) in Frenchtown, CR 519 in Kingwood Township, CR 579 on the border of Delaware Township and Raritan Township, and CR 523 in Raritan Township.

The route was designated in 1927 to run from Frenchtown to Raritan, Somerset County, running along its current alignment to Flemington and following present-day US 202 between Flemington and Raritan. By the 1940s, US 202 and Route 29 replaced Route 12 east of Flemington, and the route was officially designated to end in Flemington in 1953. There are currently plans to modify or eliminate three traffic circles along the route in Flemington to ease traffic congestion.

== Route description ==
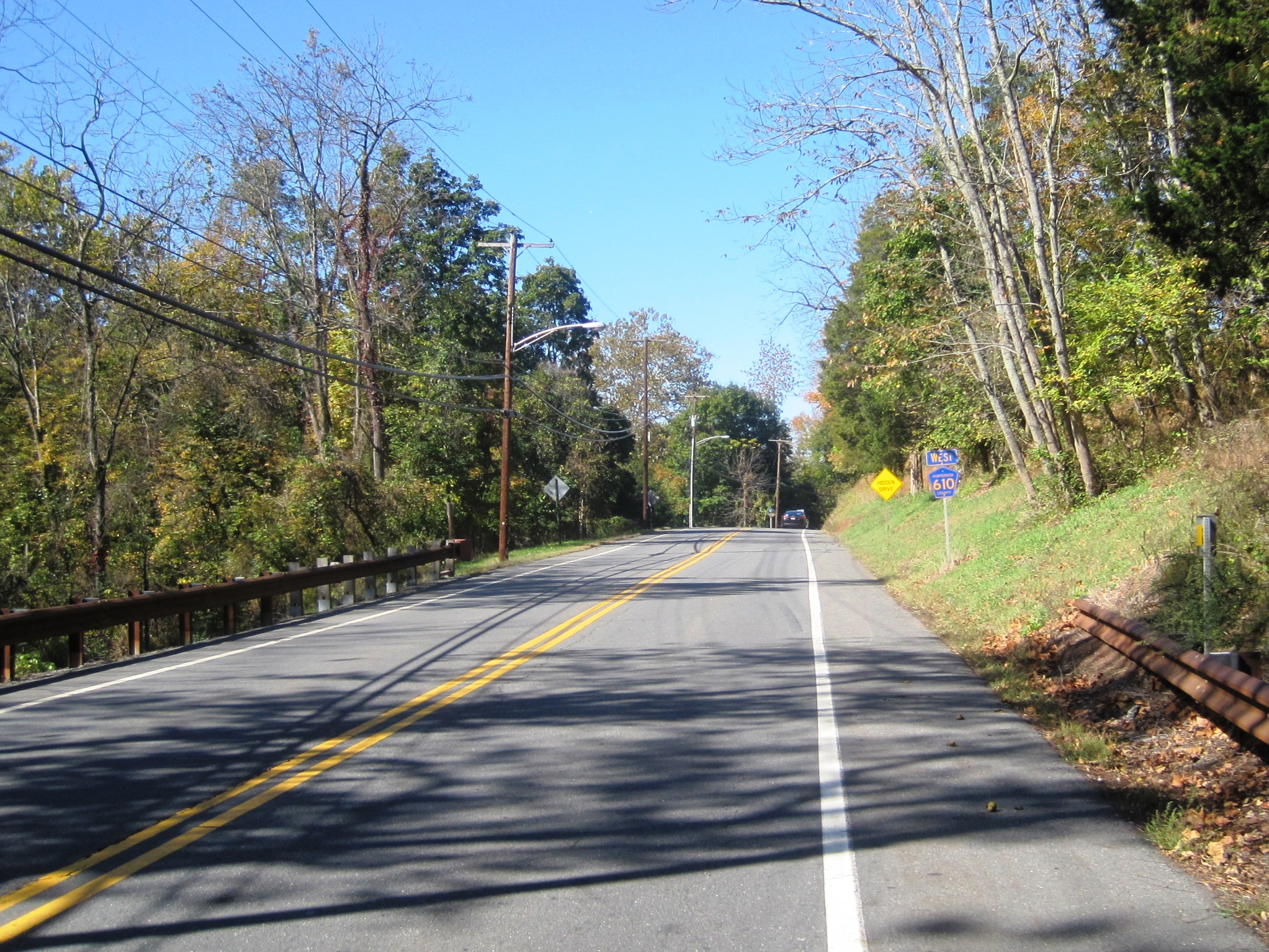
County-maintained portion of Route 12 in Frenchtown signed as CR 610

Route 12 begins at the Uhlerstown–Frenchtown Bridge over the Delaware River in Frenchtown at the Pennsylvania / New Jersey border, where it connects to Pennsylvania Route 32. The bridge and short portion of its eastern approach is maintained by the Delaware River Joint Toll Bridge Commission. The route continues through the downtown area of Frenchtown as county-maintained (designated and signed by Hunterdon County as County Route 610) two-lane undivided Bridge Street. Here, it intersects Trenton Avenue which is also the northern terminus of Route 29 before turning north onto Race Street and intersecting the southern terminus of CR 513. Route 12 heads east on Kingwood Avenue and passes through residential areas. The route crosses into Kingwood Township, where it becomes maintained by the New Jersey Department of Transportation with two eastbound lanes and one westbound lane. As Route 12 climbs into the Hunterdon Plateau, it heads through a mix of woods and farms with intermittent residences, narrowing to one lane in each direction at the top of the plateau before crossing CR 519 in Baptistown.

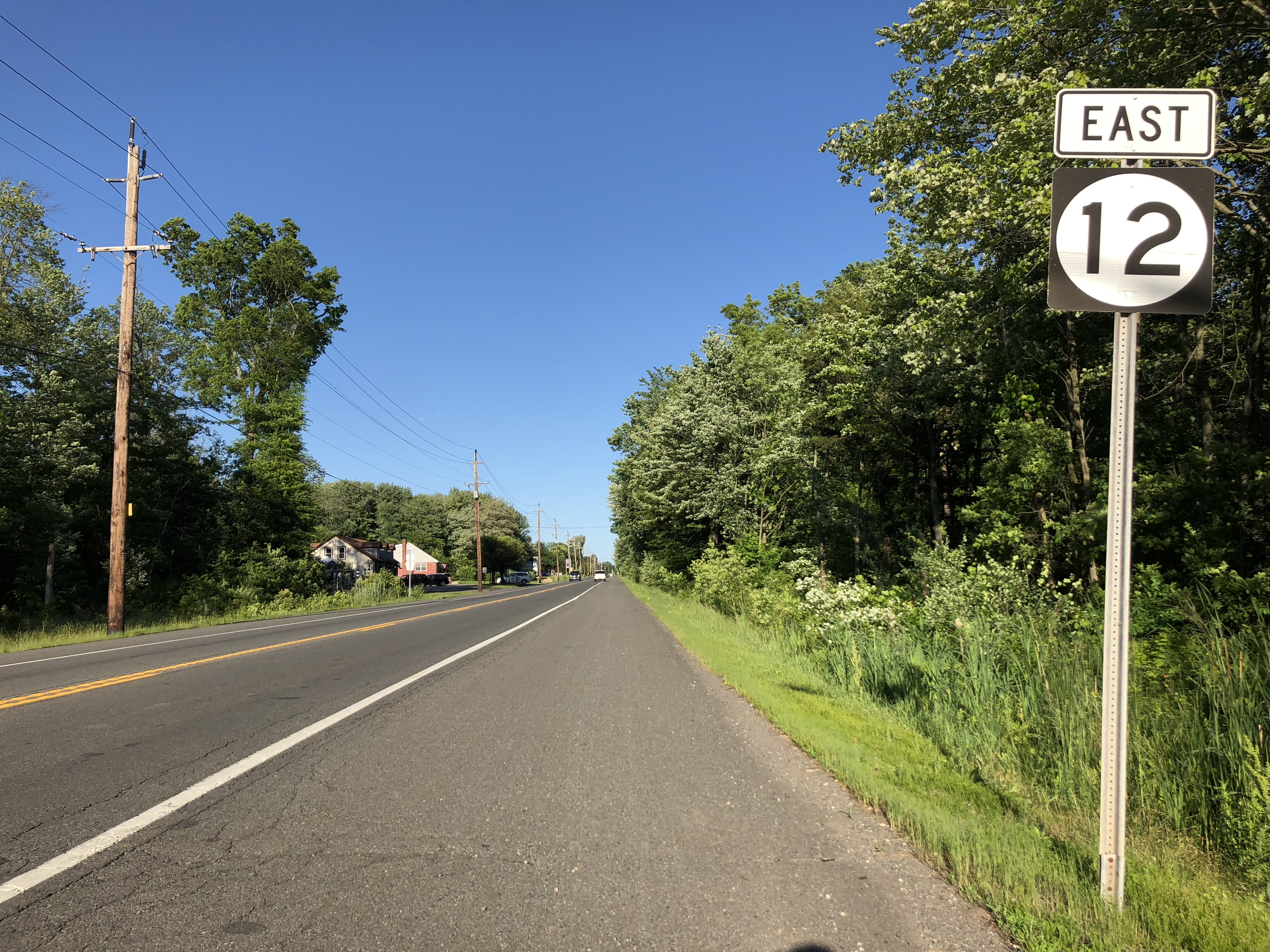
View east along Route 12 at CR 579 in Raritan Township

Route 12 continues southeast through rural areas, crossing the Lockatong Creek before intersecting CR 615, where it becomes the Samuel Hill Highway. A short distance past this intersection, the route briefly passes through the southern corner of Franklin Township before entering Delaware Township. Here, the road crosses Wickecheoke Creek before coming to an intersection with CR 579. Past this intersection, Route 12 enters Raritan Township, where it continues through rural areas with some residences. The residential development along the road increases before it reaches the Dvoor's Circle (a traffic circle) with CR 523. Past the traffic circle, the route crosses a small stream and enters Flemington. Here, Route 12 passes businesses and heads south of a park and ride lot serving Trans-Bridge Lines buses before crossing the Black River and Western Railroad and coming to the Main Street Circle, a modern-designed roundabout, where it intersects CR 611 and Reaville Avenue. From here, the route continues east a short distance as a four-lane divided highway before ending at US 202 and Route 31 at the Flemington Circle.

== History ==
Route 12 was legislated as a new route in the 1927 New Jersey state highway renumbering that was to run from Frenchtown east to Route 28 in Raritan borough, running along its current alignment to Flemington and following present-day US 202 to Raritan. By the 1940s, US 202 and Route 29 were designated along the alignment of Route 12 between Flemington and Raritan, cutting the route's eastern terminus back to Flemington. In the 1953 New Jersey state highway renumbering, Route 12 was officially legislated to run from Frenchtown to US 202 and Route 69 (now Route 31) in Flemington. There are currently plans to modify or eliminate the three traffic circles along Route 12 in Flemington in order to ease traffic congestion along the route. The Main Street Circle was converted to a modern roundabout in 2010 while plans are still being thought out for the other two traffic circles.

By Joint Resolution No. 1, approved April 22, 1940, the New Jersey Legislature designated Route 12 from the junction with present-day Route 31 to Croton as the Samuel Hill Highway, in memory of local industrial pioneer Samuel Hill.

== Major intersections ==
The entire route is in Hunterdon County.

Location	mi	km	Destinations	Notes
Delaware River	0.00	0.00	To PA 32 (River Road) – Uhlerstown	Continuation into Pennsylvania
Delaware River	0.00	0.00	Uhlerstown–Frenchtown Bridge	
Frenchtown	0.21	0.34	Route 29 south (Trenton Avenue) – Lambertville, Trenton	Northern terminus of Route 29
Frenchtown	0.27	0.43	CR 513 north (Race Street) – Milford, Pittstown	Southern terminus of CR 513
Kingwood Township	3.23	5.20	CR 519 (Kingwood Road) – Mt. Pleasant, Stockton	
Delaware–Raritan township line	7.48	12.04	CR 579 (Croton Road) – Croton, Quakertown, Sergeantsville	
Raritan Township	10.73	17.27	CR 523 to Route 29 – Flemington, Stockton	Dvoor's Circle
Flemington	11.69	18.81	US 202 / Route 31 – Somerville, Newark, Lambertville, Trenton, Clinton	Flemington Circle; eastern terminus
1.000 mi = 1.609 km; 1.000 km = 0.621 mi
