= Anna Pump =

American chef

Anna Pump (born Anna Heitweg Tuitjer; April 11, 1934 – October 5, 2015) was a German-born American chef, cookbook author, baker, and innkeeper best known for her bakery and gourmet takeout shop in The Hamptons, Loaves & Fishes. She was the author of four cookbooks and the owner of the Bridgehampton Inn. Pump was a mentor to Ina Garten, of Food Network, who wrote the foreword to Pump's final cookbook Summer on a Plate. She was sometimes a guest on Garten's Barefoot Contessa.

Pump was born on a farm in Tarp, Germany. She moved to the US with her husband, Detlef Pump and both children, Harm and Sybille in 1960, where they lived in Frenchtown, New Jersey, before moving to the Hamptons more than a decade later.

A resident of Sag Harbor, New York, Pump died in Bridgehampton on October 5, 2015, at age 81, when she was struck by a pickup truck driver who failed to yield at a crossing.

== Bibliography ==
- The Loaves and Fishes Cookbook (1987)
- The Loaves and Fishes Party Cookbook (1990)
- Country Weekend Entertaining (1999)
- Summer on a Plate (2008)
