= Uhlerstown Covered Bridge =

- U.S. Historic district – Contributing property
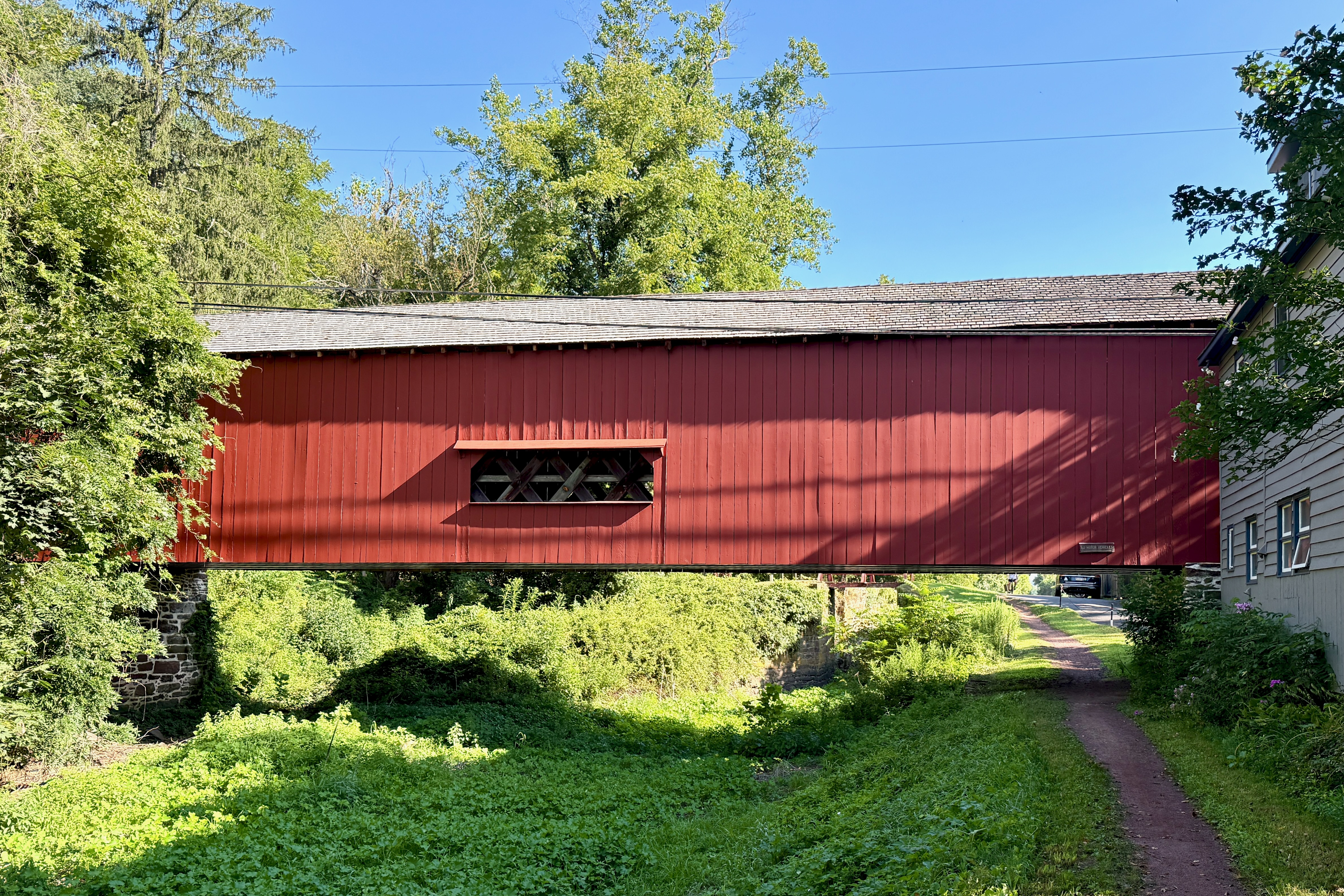
- Uhlerstown Covered Bridge spanning the Delaware Canal

- Location within Pennsylvania Location within the United States
- Location: Uhlerstown Hill Road, Uhlerstown, Pennsylvania
- Coordinates: 40°31′31.6″N 75°4′23.2″W
- Built: 1856
- Architectural style: Town lattice truss
- Part of: Pennsylvania Canal (Delaware Division) (ID74001756)
- MPS: Covered Bridges of the Delaware River Watershed TR
- Added to NRHP: October 29, 1974

The Uhlerstown Covered Bridge spans the Delaware Canal in the village of Uhlerstown in Tinicum Township, Bucks County, Pennsylvania. The historic bridge was built in 1856, and was reconstructed using original materials in 1985. It was added to the National Register of Historic Places as part of the Covered Bridges of the Delaware River Watershed Multiple Property Submission (MPS). It is part of the Delaware Canal and the Uhlerstown Historic District. The bridge was documented by the Historic American Engineering Record (HAER) in 2002.

The bridge was built in 1856 by Mahlon C. Lear and is the only covered bridge that crosses the Delaware Canal. It is next to lock 18 of the canal.

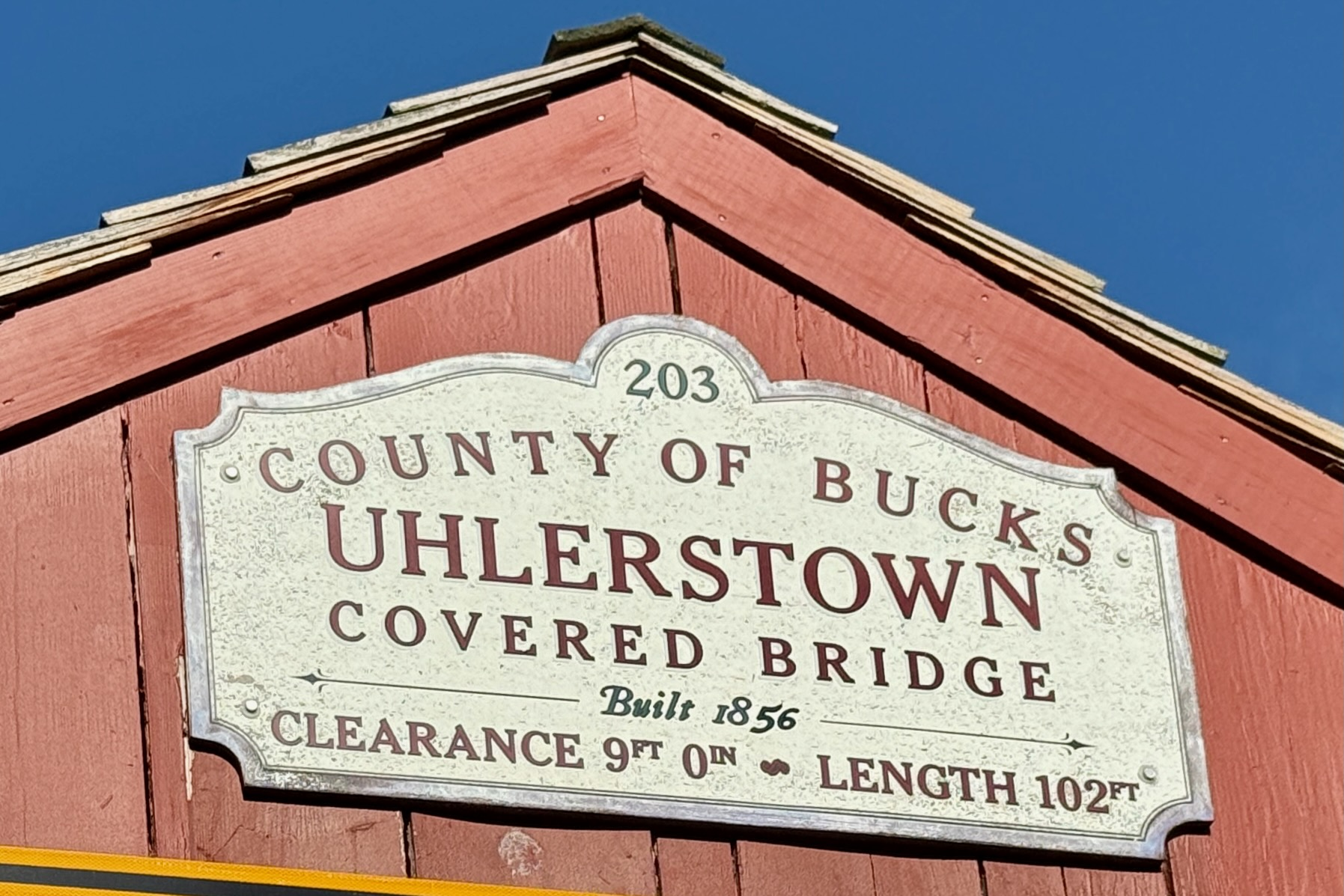
Nameplate

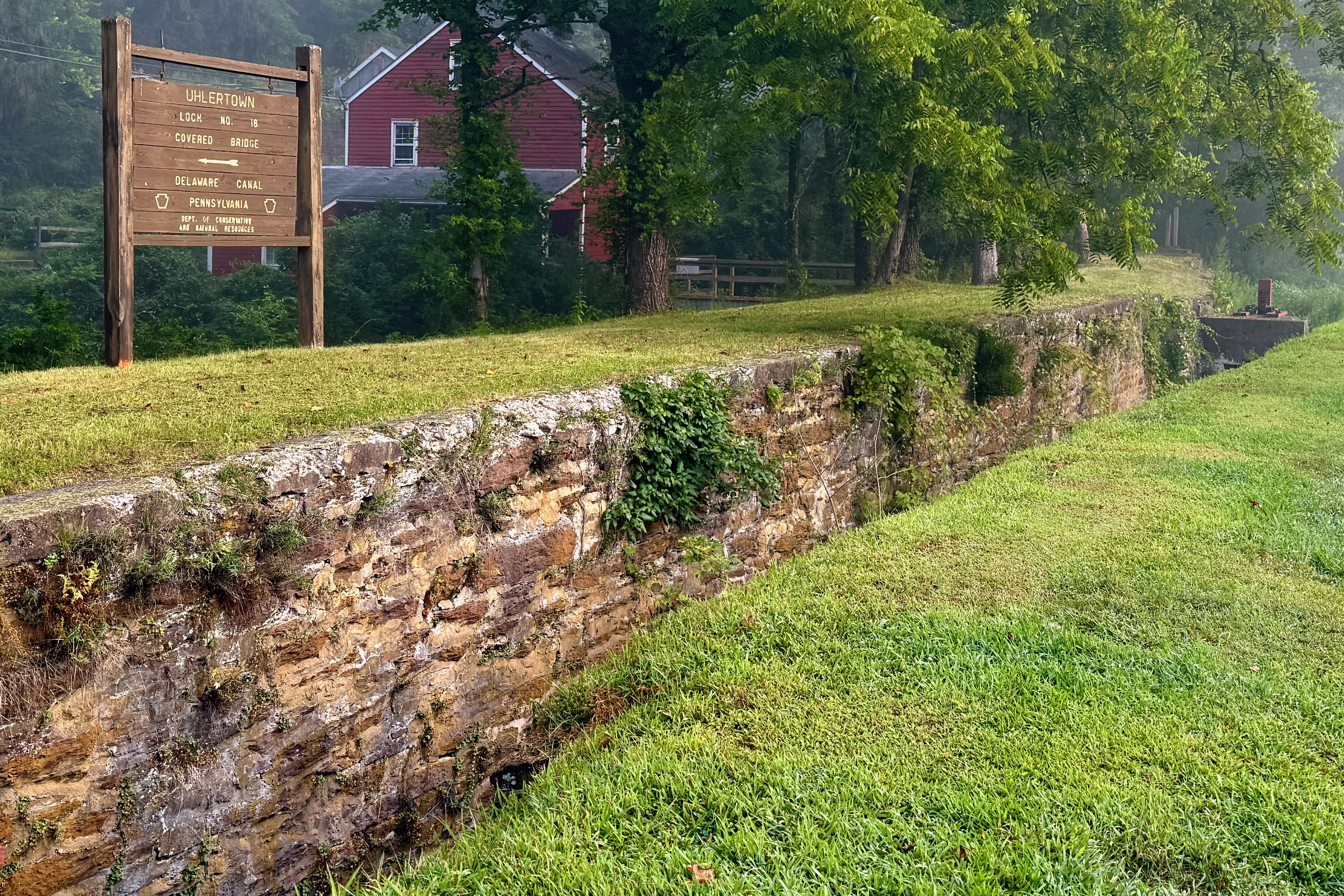
Lock 18, next to the bridge

== See also ==
- List of covered bridges on the National Register of Historic Places in Pennsylvania
- List of bridges documented by the Historic American Engineering Record in Pennsylvania
