= Uhlerstown, Pennsylvania =

Unincorporated community in Pennsylvania, US

- Unincorporated community
- Location within Pennsylvania Location within the United States
- Coordinates: 40°31′31″N 75°04′24″W
- Country: United States
- State: Pennsylvania
- County: Bucks
- Township: Tinicum
- Elevation: 115 ft (35 m)
- Time zone: UTC-5 (Eastern (EST))
  - Summer (DST): UTC-4 (EDT)
- ZIP Code: 18920
- Area codes: 610 and 484
- GNIS feature ID: 1204847

Uhlerstown, also spelled Uhlertown, is an unincorporated community in Tinicum Township, Bucks County, Pennsylvania, United States. The community is located along Pennsylvania Route 32 (River Road) and is served by the 18920 ZIP Code.

Uhlerstown is one of the many Delaware River communities in the county. In 1949, painter Frederick Harer died here.

Uhlerstown actually uses the post office and ZIP Code of nearby Erwinna; therefore, many Uhlerstown residents say that they are from Erwinna, as that is what shows up on their addresses.

The Uhlerstown–Frenchtown Bridge, a free Delaware River Joint Toll Bridge Commission bridge over the Delaware River, connects Pennsylvania Route 32 in Uhlerstown to New Jersey Route 12 in Frenchtown in Hunterdon County, New Jersey; PA 32 leads south to Interstate 295, which leads to Philadelphia. The existing bridge has a roadway width of 16 feet 6 inches. A sidewalk is supported on steel cantilever brackets. The bridge maintains a fifteen-mile per hour speed limit.

The Uhlerstown Historic District, including the Uhlerstown Covered Bridge, was added to the National Register of Historic Places in 1994.

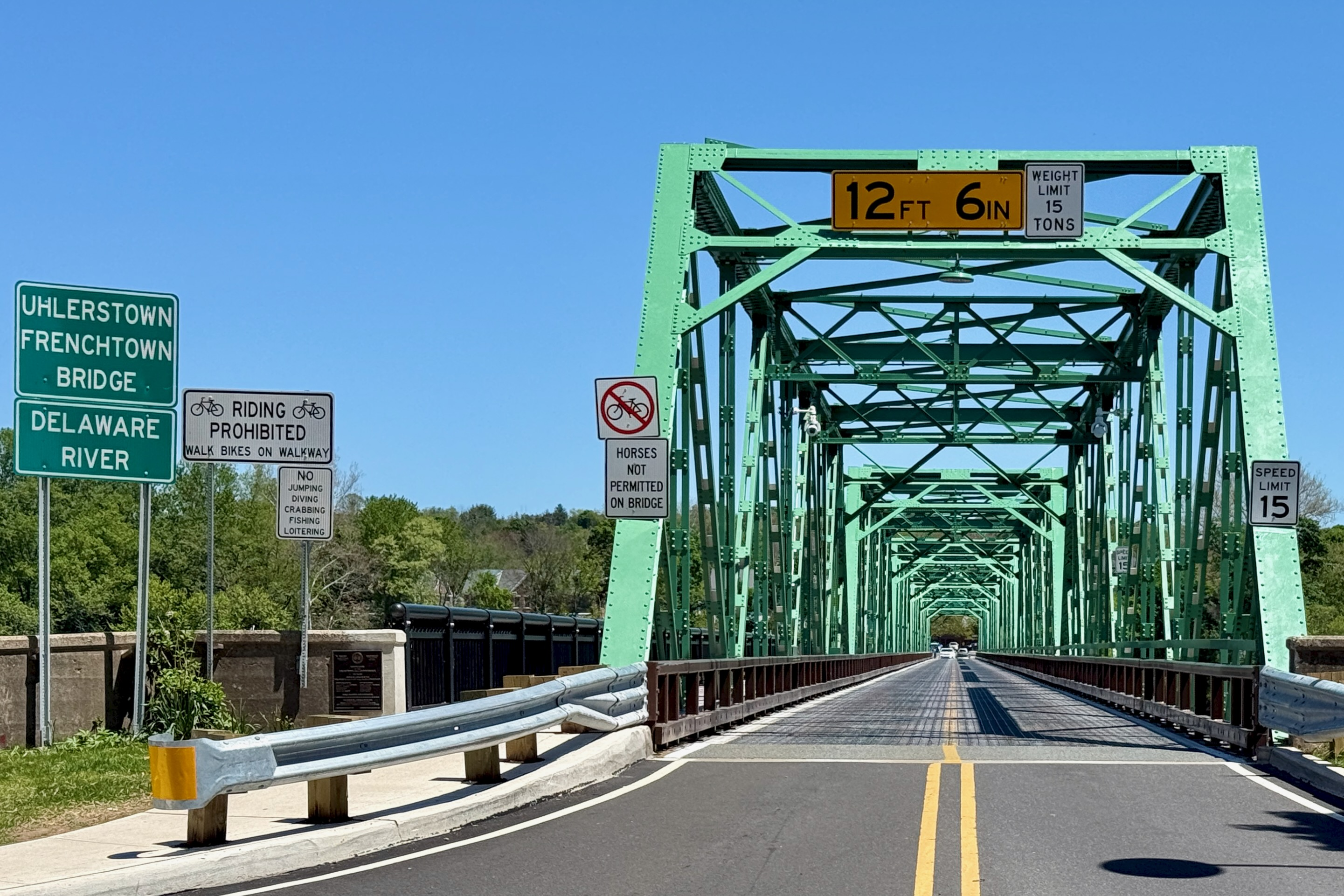
Approach to the Uhlerstown–Frenchtown Bridge from Uhlerstown

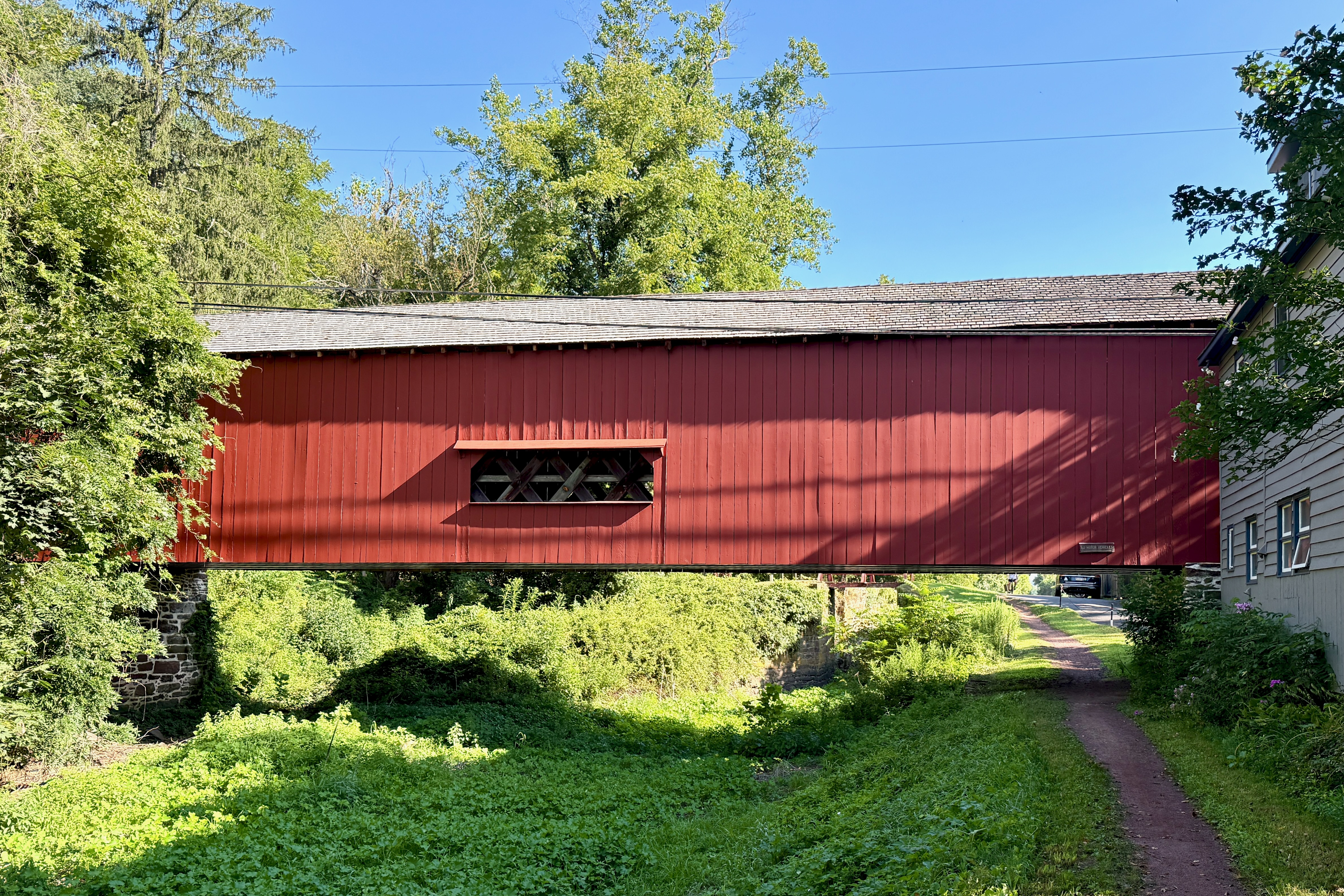
Uhlerstown Covered Bridge spanning the Delaware Canal
