= Willis M. Rivinus =

American historian

Willis M. Rivinus is an American author, preservation activist and historian whose interests center on the Delaware Canal and Bucks County, Pennsylvania.

== Books ==
Among the guides and books Rivinus has written and edited are Guide to the Delaware Canal, The Complete Guide to the Delaware and Lehigh National Corridor, William Penn and the Lenape Indians, The Red Man in Bucks County, Old Stonework in Bucks County, The Cabins of Huron Mountain Club, Early Taverns of Bucks County, and Rowing At Princeton: 1872-2000.

== Delaware Canal advocacy ==
Rivinus is a long-time advocate for preserving the Delaware Canal. While the Canal withstood earlier threats to its existence such as a state-led plan in the 1940s to pave it over and create a road for cars, by the early 1960s it had fallen into a state of neglect. To draw attention to its historical and environmental value, Rivinus in 1964 wrote and published the first guide to the Delaware Canal, titled A Wayfarer's Guide to the Delaware Canal between Easton and Bristol, Pa.

Through the 1960s and 1970s, Rivinus and other local citizens raised funds and lobbied the federal government for the Canal's landmark designation. The Canal was placed on the National Register of Historic Places in 1974 and made a National Historic Landmark in 1976. In 1988, a bill was signed into law creating the Delaware and Lehigh National Heritage Corridor Commission and Rivinus became its first chairman, a post he held until 1991.

Rivinus has continued to be involved in Delaware Canal advocacy. His updated Guide to the Delaware Canal is in its 8th edition, which features vintage photos by Louis Comfort Tiffany. At present, Rivinus is working on the ninth edition. He is a board member of the Friends of the Delaware Canal, a non-profit group dedicated to restoring and maintaining the Canal. Entering his ninth decade, Rivinus still leads free tours of the canal and its environs and gives historical lectures.

== Princeton eating clubs controversy ==
Rivinus' preservation activities have extended to controversial institutions. He is a 1950 alumnus of Princeton University and in 1983 became chief fund-raiser for the school's private eating clubs, including several all-male clubs that at the time were defendants in a sex discrimination suit filed by undergraduate Sally Frank. Rivinus extensively documented the case and the Willis M. Rivinus Papers: 1979-1991 are in the Princeton University Library Department of Rare Books and Special Collections. Rivinus remained a fund-raiser for the clubs until 2003 and continues to support their existence.

== Personal life ==
Rivinus is from a Chestnut Hill, Philadelphia family and his mother, Marion Willis Martin Rivinus, also wrote books of historical interest. Among them are Lights Along the Delaware, The Story of Rittenhouse Square: 1682-1951 and A Full Life, her memoirs of life as a Philadelphia society belle and sportswoman.

Rivinus resides in Solebury Township near the borough of New Hope in Bucks County.

== Bibliography ==
- Barns of Bucks County, with Jeffrey L. Marshall, 2007.
- A Wayfarer's Guide to the Delaware Canal between Bristol and Easton, Pa., retitled A Guide to the Delaware Canal, 1978, 1984, 1989, 1993, 2004.
- Rowing At Princeton: 1872-2000, 2002.
- The Complete Guide to the Delaware and Lehigh National Heritage Corridor, 1994.
- William Penn and the Lenape Indians, 1995.
- New Hope, Pennsylvania,1973.
- Old Stonework in Bucks County, 1972.
- The Cabins of Huron Mountain Club, 1969.
- The Red man in Bucks County, 1965.
- Early Taverns of Bucks County, 1965.
