= Shea Hembrey =

American artist

- Born: 1974 (age 51–52); Hickory Grove, Arkansas, U.S.
- Education: Master of Fine Arts, Cornell University
- Occupation: Conceptual artist
- Known for: "SEEK" biennial
- Website: www.sheahembrey.com

Shea Hembrey (born 1974 in Hickory Grove, Arkansas) is an American conceptual artist. He received national attention in 2011 with the release of "SEEK", a biennial of art showcasing the work of 100 artists—all of whom he invented and created the artwork for himself. Before entering the art world, he worked as licensed breeder of migratory waterfowl with the U.S. Department of the Interior. He also spent a year studying Maori art in New Zealand and, in 2007, he received Master of Fine Arts from Cornell University. He is an advocate for artwork that marries intellectual rigor, technical mastery, and heart and soul.

He is represented by Bryce Wolkowitz Gallery in New York and by the Wylie literary agency.
