= Frenchtown School District =

School district in Hunterdon County, New Jersey, US

Address
- 902 Harrison Street Frenchtown, Hunterdon County, New Jersey, 08825; United States
- Coordinates: 40.534055°N 75.062556°W

District information
- Grades: PreK-8
- Superintendent: James Hintenach
- Business administrator: Teresa O'Brien
- Schools: 1

Students and staff
- Enrollment: 104 (as of 2023–24)
- Faculty: 15.6 FTEs
- Student–teacher ratio: 6.7:1

Other information
- District Factor Group: FG
- Website: www.frenchtownschool.org
Ind.	Per pupil	District spending	Rank (*)	K-8 average	%± vs. average
1A	Total Spending	$19,928	43	$18,891	5.5%
1	Budgetary Cost	15,629	43	14,159	10.4%
2	Classroom Instruction	9,674	46	8,659	11.7%
6	Support Services	2,510	36	2,167	15.8%
8	Administrative Cost	1,365	10	1,547	−11.8%
10	Operations & Maintenance	1,841	41	1,612	14.2%
13	Extracurricular Activities	175	44	104	68.3%
16	Median Teacher Salary	54,770	20	61,136
Data from NJDoE 2014 Taxpayers' Guide to Education Spending. *Of K-8 districts with up to 400 students. Lowest spending=1; Highest=71

The Frenchtown School District is a community public school district that serves students in pre-kindergarten through eighth grade from Frenchtown, in Hunterdon County, in the U.S. state of New Jersey.

As of the 2023–24 school year, the district, comprised of one school, had an enrollment of 104 students and 15.6 classroom teachers (on an FTE basis), for a student–teacher ratio of 6.7:1.

The district participates in the Interdistrict Public School Choice Program, which allows non-resident students to attend school in the district at no cost to their parents, with tuition covered by the resident district. Available slots are announced annually by grade.

Public school students in ninth through twelfth grades attend the Delaware Valley Regional High School in Frenchtown, which serves students in western Hunterdon County from Alexandria, Holland and Kingwood Townships along with the boroughs of Frenchtown and Milford. As of the 2023–24 school year, the high school had an enrollment of 692 students and 61.5 classroom teachers (on an FTE basis), for a student–teacher ratio of 11.3:1.

== History ==
Prior to the completion of Delaware Valley Regional High School, which opened in September 1959, students from Frenchtown had attended Frenchtown High School, which held its final graduation ceremonies in June 1959. The school building had been built in 1925 to serve grades K-12, with the high school on the top floor. The school building was named for Edith Ort Thomas, who served as a teacher and board member for a half century.

In the 2016–17 school year, Frenchtown was tied for the 18th-smallest enrollment of any school district in the state, with 129 students.

The district had been classified by the New Jersey Department of Education as being in District Factor Group "FG", the fourth-highest of eight groupings. District Factor Groups organize districts statewide to allow comparison by common socioeconomic characteristics of the local districts. From lowest socioeconomic status to highest, the categories are A, B, CD, DE, FG, GH, I and J.

== School ==
Edith Ort Thomas Elementary School had an enrollment of 108 students in the 2021–22 school year.

== Administration ==
Core members of the school's administration are:

- James Hintenach, superintendent
- Teresa O'Brien, business administrator / board secretary

== Board of education ==
The district's board of education, comprised of seven members, sets policy and oversees the fiscal and educational operation of the district through its administration. As a Type II school district, the board's trustees are elected directly by voters to serve three-year terms of office on a staggered basis, with either two or three seats up for election each year held (since 2012) as part of the November general election. The board appoints a superintendent to oversee the district's day-to-day operations and a business administrator to supervise the business functions of the district. In February 2012, elections were shifted from April to November.
