= Holland Township School District =

School district in Hunterdon County, New Jersey, US

Address
- 714 Milford-Warren Glen Road Holland Township, Hunterdon County, New Jersey, 08848; United States
- Coordinates: 40.600221°N 75.116882°W

District information
- Grades: PreK-8
- Superintendent: Stephanie Snyder
- Business administrator: Teresa O'Brien
- Schools: 1

Students and staff
- Enrollment: 510 (as of 2023–24)
- Faculty: 62.5 FTEs
- Student–teacher ratio: 8.2:1

Other information
- District Factor Group: FG
- Website: www.hollandschool.org
Ind.	Per pupil	District spending	Rank (*)	K-8 average	%± vs. average
1A	Total Spending	$18,455	32	$18,891	−2.3%
1	Budgetary Cost	16,572	51	14,159	17.0%
2	Classroom Instruction	10,517	58	8,659	21.5%
6	Support Services	2,472	42	2,167	14.1%
8	Administrative Cost	1,837	50	1,547	18.7%
10	Operations & Maintenance	1,619	36	1,612	0.4%
13	Extracurricular Activities	127	33	104	22.1%
16	Median Teacher Salary	55,671	16	61,136
Data from NJDoE 2014 Taxpayers' Guide to Education Spending. *Of K-8 districts with 401-750 students. Lowest spending=1; Highest=64

The Holland Township School District is a community public school district that serves students in pre-kindergarten through eighth grade from Holland Township, in Hunterdon County, in the U.S. state of New Jersey.

As of the 2023–24 school year, the district, comprised of one school, had an enrollment of 510 students and 62.5 classroom teachers (on an FTE basis), for a student–teacher ratio of 8.2:1.

The district participates in the Interdistrict Public School Choice Program, which allows non-resident students to attend school in the district at no cost to their parents, with tuition covered by the resident district. Available slots are announced annually by grade.

The district had been classified by the New Jersey Department of Education as being in District Factor Group "FG", the fourth-highest of eight groupings. District Factor Groups organize districts statewide to allow comparison by common socioeconomic characteristics of the local districts. From lowest socioeconomic status to highest, the categories are A, B, CD, DE, FG, GH, I and J.

Students in public school for ninth through twelfth grades attend Delaware Valley Regional High School, together with students from Alexandria Township, Frenchtown, Kingwood Township and Milford. As of the 2023–24 school year, the high school had an enrollment of 692 students and 61.5 classroom teachers (on an FTE basis), for a student–teacher ratio of 11.3:1.

== Awards and recognition ==
For the 1995-96 school year, Holland Township School was named a "Star School" by the New Jersey Department of Education, the highest honor that a New Jersey school can achieve.

== Schools ==
Schools in the district (with 2023–24 enrollment data from the National Center for Education Statistics) are:

- Holland Township Elementary School served 512 students in grades PreK-8
  - Susan Wardell, principal

== Administration ==
Core members of the district's administration are:

- Stephanie Snyder, superintendent
- Teresa O'Brien, business administrator and board secretary

== Board of education ==
The district's board of education, comprised of nine members, sets policy and oversees the fiscal and educational operation of the district through its administration. As a Type II school district, the board's trustees are elected directly by voters to serve three-year terms of office on a staggered basis, with three seats up for election each year held (since 2012) as part of the November general election. The board appoints a superintendent to oversee the district's day-to-day operations and a business administrator to supervise the business functions of the district. Members of the board of education for the 2024–25 school year are Matthew Davis (President), Brett Curry (Vice President), Thomas Friend, Michael Giovannetti, Amy Hawrylo, John Schleicher and one vacancy.
