= Hughesville =

Hughesville is the name of several places in the United States:

- Hughesville, Maryland
- Hughesville, Missouri
- Hughesville, New Jersey
- Hughesville, Pennsylvania

== Fictional places ==
- Hughesville, a fictional location in the 2019 animated series The Rocketeer.
