= N85 =

N85 may refer to:

== Roads ==
- N85 road (Ireland)
- N-85 National Highway, in the Pakistan
- Nebraska Highway 85, in the United States

== Other uses ==
- Alexandria Airport (New Jersey), in Hunterdon County, New Jersey, United States
- HMS N85, a German submarine surrendered to the Royal Navy after the Second World War
- Nokia N85, a smartphone
- Yugul language
