= Mount Salem Vineyards =

American winery located in New Jersey

Coordinates: 40.592454°N 74.988501°W

- Location: 54 Mount Salem Road, Pittstown, NJ, USA
- Coordinates: 40.592454 N, 74.988501 W
- First vines planted: 2005
- Opened to the public: 2010
- Key people: Peter Leitner (owner)
- Area cultivated: 7
- Cases/yr: 1,000 (2014)
- Distribution: On-site, subscription
- Tasting: Tastings on weekends and by appointment
- Website: http://www.mountsalemvineyards.com/

Mount Salem Vineyards is a boutique winery in the Pittstown section of Alexandria Township in Hunterdon County, New Jersey, United States. Formerly a produce, grain, and dairy farm, the vineyard was first planted in 2005, and opened to the public in 2010. Peter Leiter, the proprietor of Mount Salem, founded the Appalachian Highlands Vinifera Society, whose mission is to enhance the quality of wine grape growing and winemaking in Northern New Jersey. Mount Salem has 7 acres of grapes under cultivation, and produces 1,000 cases of wine per year. The winery is located at over 600 feet above sea level on Mount Salem, the mountain for which the farm is named.

== Wines ==
Mount Salem Vineyards specializes in the use of Austrian and Northern Italian grapes. Wine is produced from Albariño, Barbera, Blaufränkisch (Lemberger), Cabernet Franc, Chardonnay, Grüner Veltliner, Merlot, Riesling, St. Laurent, Traminette, Viognier, and Zweigelt grapes. It is the only winery in New Jersey that produces wine from St. Laurent, which is a vinifera grape indigenous to Austria. Mount Salem is not located in one of New Jersey's three viticultural areas.

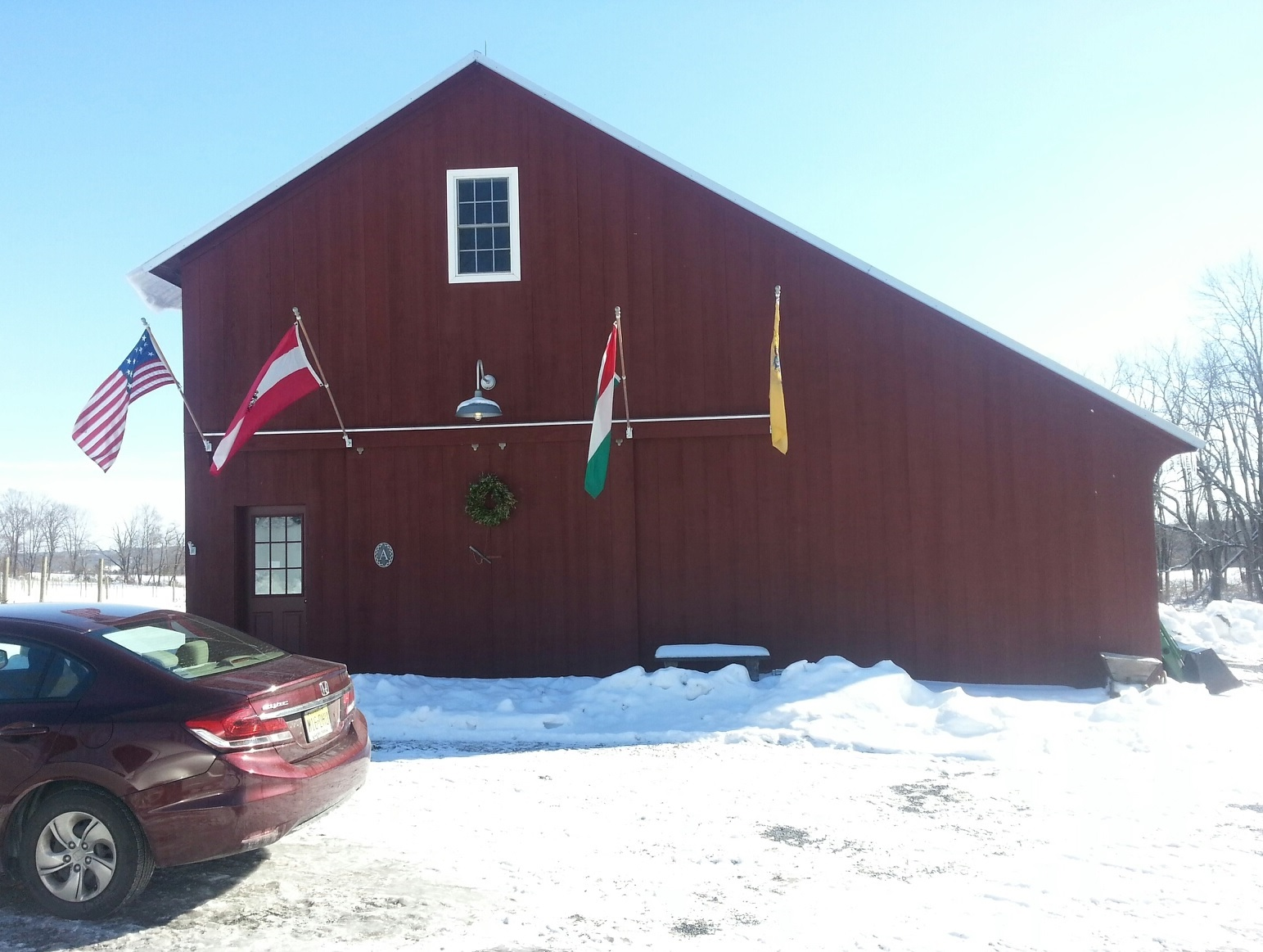
Mount Salem's tasting room is in 200-year-old structure that once served as a barn.

== Advocacy, licensing and associations ==
Mount Salem advocates Burgundian winemaking practices, including a strong emphasis on terroir, and the use of high-quality fruit and labor-intensive farming practices to produce premium wines. Mount Salem has a farm winery license from the New Jersey Division of Alcoholic Beverage Control, which allows it to produce up to 50,000 gallons of wine per year, operate up to 15 off-premises sales rooms, and ship up to 12 cases per year to consumers in-state or out-of-state. The winery is not a member of the Garden State Wine Growers Association, but is a member of the Outer Coastal Plain Vineyard Association.

== See also ==
- Alcohol laws of New Jersey
- American wine
- Judgment of Princeton
- List of wineries, breweries, and distilleries in New Jersey
- New Jersey Farm Winery Act
- New Jersey Wine Industry Advisory Council
- New Jersey wine
