= Mary DeChambres =

American film editor

- Born: Alexandria Township, New Jersey, U.S.
- Education: Sam Houston State University; University of Southern California (film editing course)
- Occupations: Film editor; television editor
- Employer: Bunim/Murray Productions
- Known for: Editing Project Runway, The Real World, Jersey Shore, The Profit
- Board member of: Board of Directors, Motion Picture Editors Guild
- Awards: Primetime Emmy Award (1 win, 2 nominations)

Mary DeChambres is an American film and television editor, and two-time Emmy Award nominee and Emmy Award winner. She sits on the board of directors for the Motion Picture Editors Guild.

== Early life and education ==
DeChambres grew up on a farm in Alexandria Township, New Jersey and attended Delaware Valley Regional High School where she cultivated her creativity at the school’s art program. She went on to study at Sam Houston State University, studying Education and Fine Arts, and while there also attended the radio, TV and Film studies programs. She also started her own local radio show.

She went on to teach at the Aldine Independent School District in Houston. On a summer hiatus, she attended a film editing course at the University of Southern California which led her to an internship at a music-video company . eventually leading to her first job at Bunim/Murray Productions working on shows like The Real World and Jersey Shore.

== Career ==
DeChambres' work has been broadcast across several networks – ABC, CNBC and MTV. She is known for her work with Oprah Winfrey, Heidi Klum, The Kardashians, Charlize Theron, Bethenny Frankel, The Osbournes's, Sean "P. Diddy" Combes, 50 Cent, Ryan O' Neal, Tatum O'Neal, Three6Mafia, Tim Gunn, Lala Anthony, Denise Richards, Marcus Lemionis and Dwayne "The Rock" Johnson. She has worked on shows including MTV's The Real World: Las Vegas and ABC's Making the Band, and Jersey Shore, CNBC's The Profit as well as the Season 5 Finale of Project Runway for which she won her first Primetime Emmy, and "Project Runway All-Stars" (Something Wicked This Way Comes) for which she earned her second Emmy nomination.

== Filmography ==
- Wake Up Call (2014)
