= Pittstown, New Jersey =

Place in Hunterdon County, New Jersey, United States

- Unincorporated community
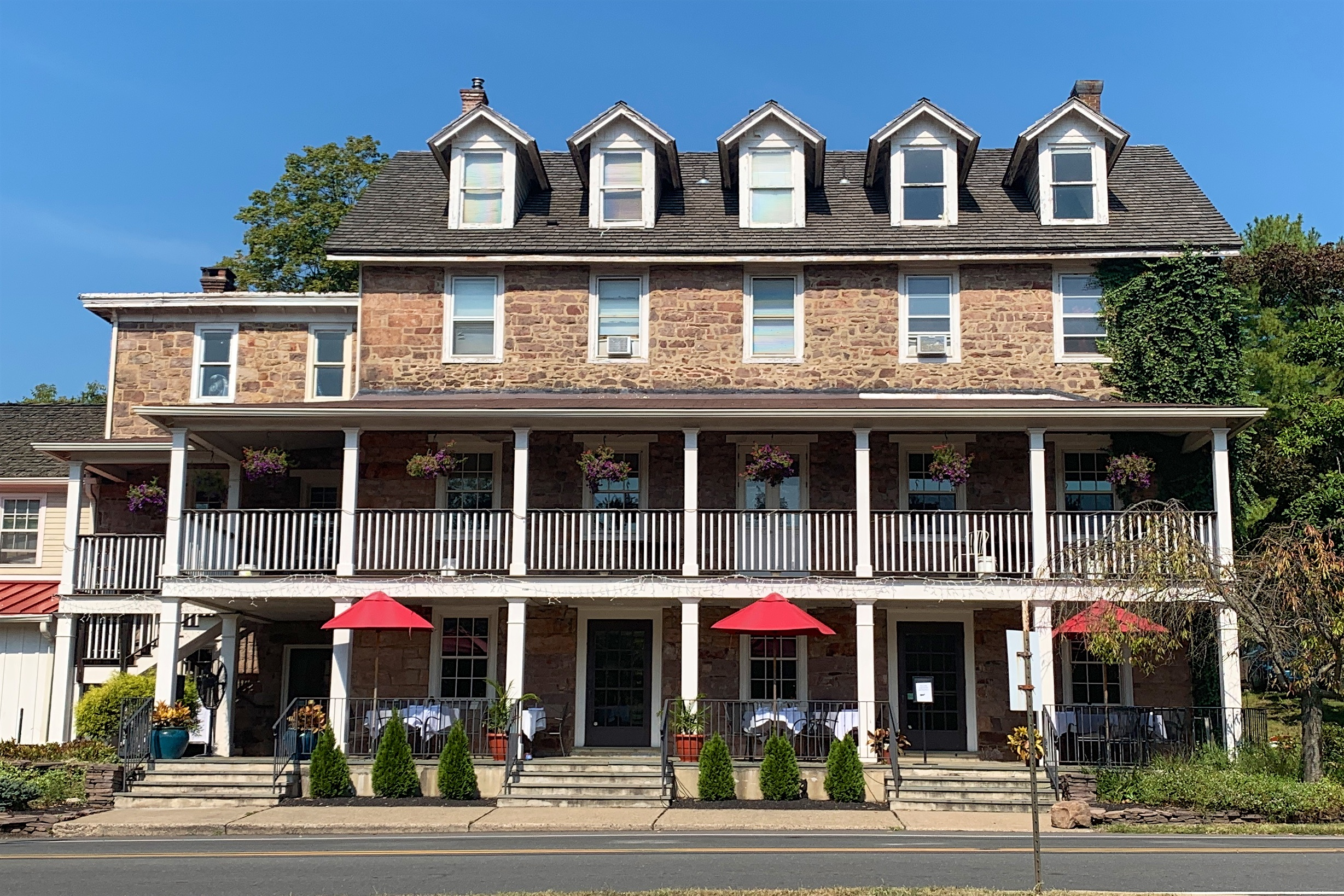
- Pittstown Inn in 2019

- Pittstown's location in Hunterdon County (Inset: Hunterdon County in New Jersey) Pittstown, New Jersey (New Jersey) Pittstown, New Jersey (the United States)
- Coordinates: 40°34′55″N 74°57′33″W
- Country: United States
- State: New Jersey
- County: Hunterdon
- Townships: Alexandria, Franklin and Union
- Named for: William Pitt
- Elevation: 381 ft (116 m)
- Time zone: UTC−05:00
  - Summer (DST): UTC−04:00
- ZIP code: 08867
- GNIS feature ID: 0879337

Pittstown is an unincorporated community located at the intersection of the boundaries of Alexandria, Franklin and Union townships in Hunterdon County, New Jersey. The area is named after William Pitt. The area is served as United States Postal Service ZIP Code 08867. The area was named Hofftown in the 18th century after landowner Lawrence Hoff. The Pittstown Historic District was listed on the state and national registers of historic places in 1990.

According to the 2020–2024 American Community Survey 5-year estimates, ZIP Code Tabulation Area (ZCTA) 08867 had a population of 5,204.

== Historic district ==
- Pittstown Historic District
- U.S. National Register of Historic Places
- U.S. Historic district
- New Jersey Register of Historic Places
- Location: Pittstown Road and adjacent portions of Race Street and Quakertown Road
- Area: 70 acres (28 ha)
- Architectural style: Greek Revival, Italianate, Federal
- NRHP reference No.: 90001483
- NJRHP No.: 1589

Significant dates
- Added to NRHP: October 11, 1990
- Designated NJRHP: August 17, 1990

The Pittstown Historic District is a historic district along Pittstown Road and adjacent portions of Race Street and Quakertown Road, encompassing the village. It was added to the National Register of Historic Places on October 11, 1990 for its significance in agriculture, architecture, settlement, industry, transportation, and military history. It includes 79 contributing buildings.

== Sites of interest ==
- The Pittstown Barn is a barn built in 1800 across from the intersection of CR 579 and Pittstown Road. The south side of the barn has: "So this is Pittstown" painted on it with "R U Lost" and an old county map underneath.
- The Pittstown Inn was originally Hoff's Mill. The building, which served as a tavern and informal town hall, was also a stagecoach stopover and place of lodging. The building went through several owners and was later known as the Century Hotel when owned by Moore Furman, before suffering a fire which greatly damaged the interior.
- The Refine Spa (Furman's Mill) was built as a stone grist mill along the on a tributary of Capoolong Creek by Moore Furman, quartermaster general of George Washington's army.

== Notable people ==
People who were born in, residents of, or otherwise closely associated with Pittstown include:

- Samuel L. Bodine (1900–1958), member of the New Jersey Senate and chairman of the New Jersey Republican State Committee.
- Hiram Deats (1810–1887), businessman, agricultural manufacturing.
- Chris Kappler (born 1967), show jumping competitor and medalist at the 2004 Summer Olympics in Athens.
- George H. Morris (born 1938), equestrian
- Frank Muehlheuser (1926–2006), American football fullback and linebacker who played in the NFL for the Boston Yanks and the New York Bulldogs.
- Frederic A. Potts (1836–1888), Republican nominee for Governor of New Jersey in 1880.
- Michelle Tesauro, Survivor: Pearl Islands contestant, who finished in 12th place.
- Elmer H. Wene (1892–1957), member of the United States House of Representatives.
- Luke Davis, member of the band The Happy Fits.
- Calvin Langman, member of the band The Happy Fits.

== Transportation ==
Alexandria Airport is located 2 statute miles (3 km) west of the central business district.

No Interstate, U.S. or State routes pass through. Only major roads, such as CR 513, CR 519 and CR 579 (which only runs along the northeast border), pass through Alexandria Township.

Interstate 78 passes through neighboring towns Union and Franklin Township.

== Wineries ==
- Beneduce Vineyards
- Mount Salem Vineyards

== Gallery ==
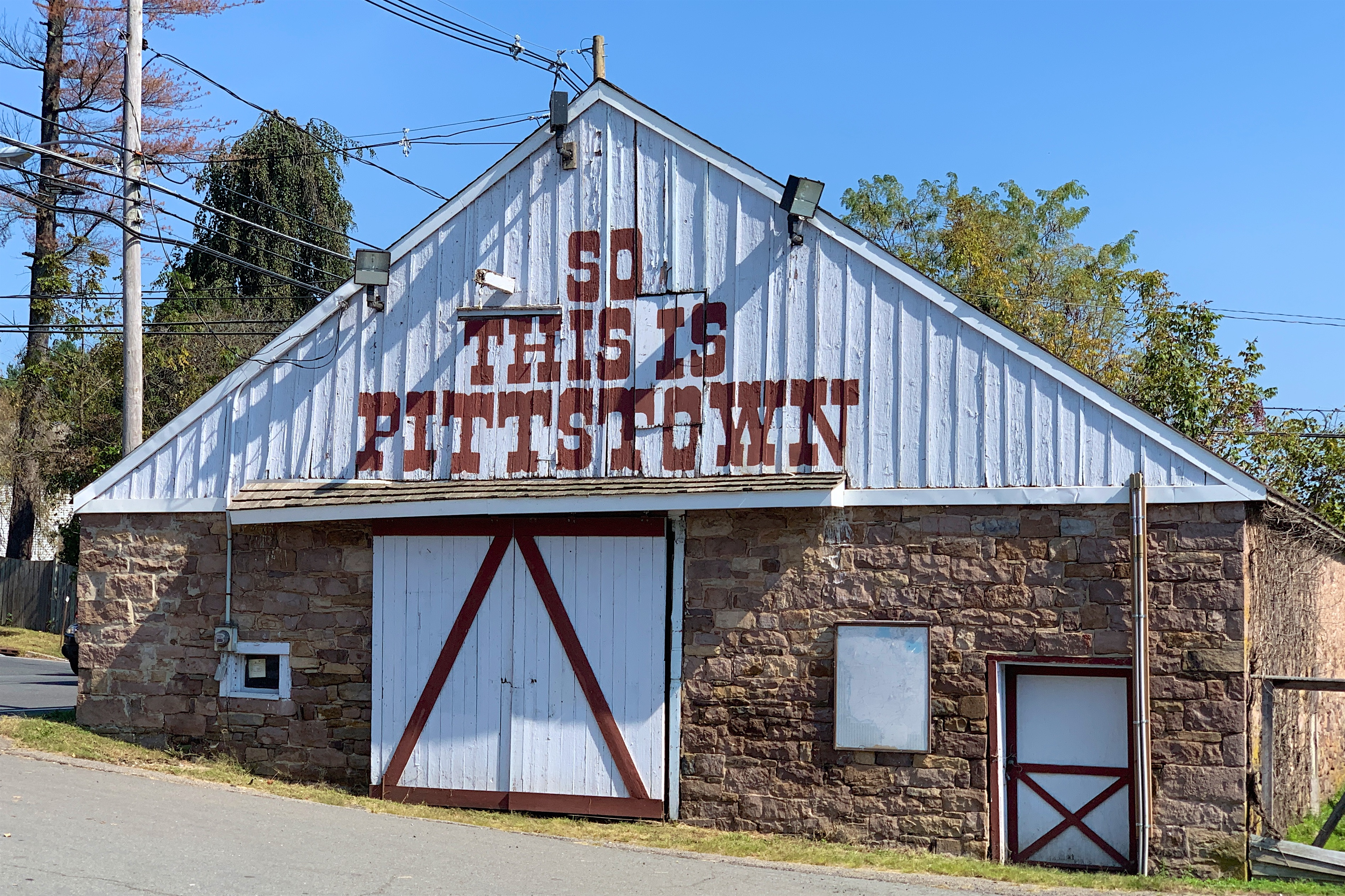
Barn with So This Is Pittstown

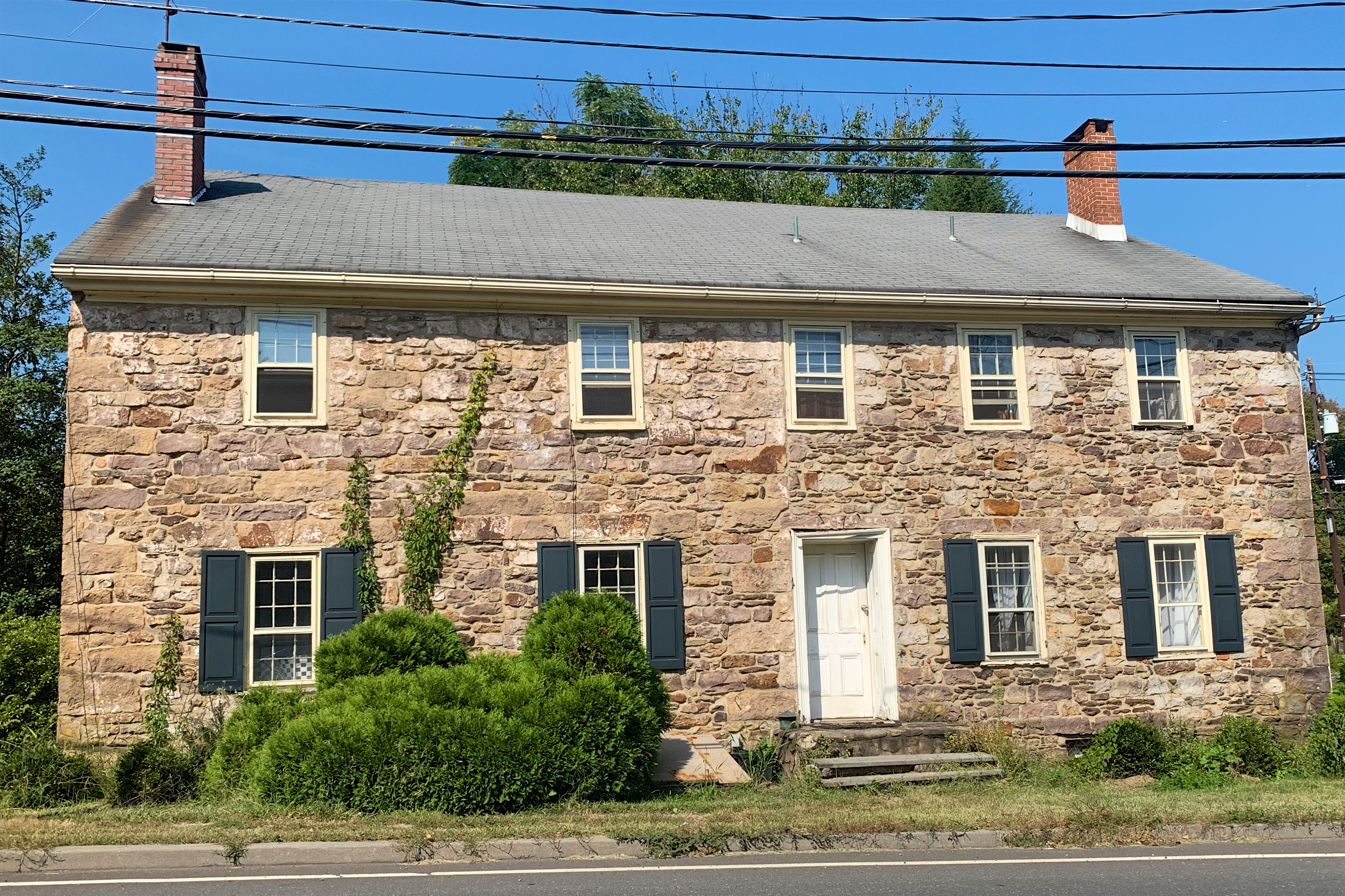
Furman–Stryker House

== See also ==
- Hunterdon Plateau
