= Upper Black Eddy–Milford Bridge =

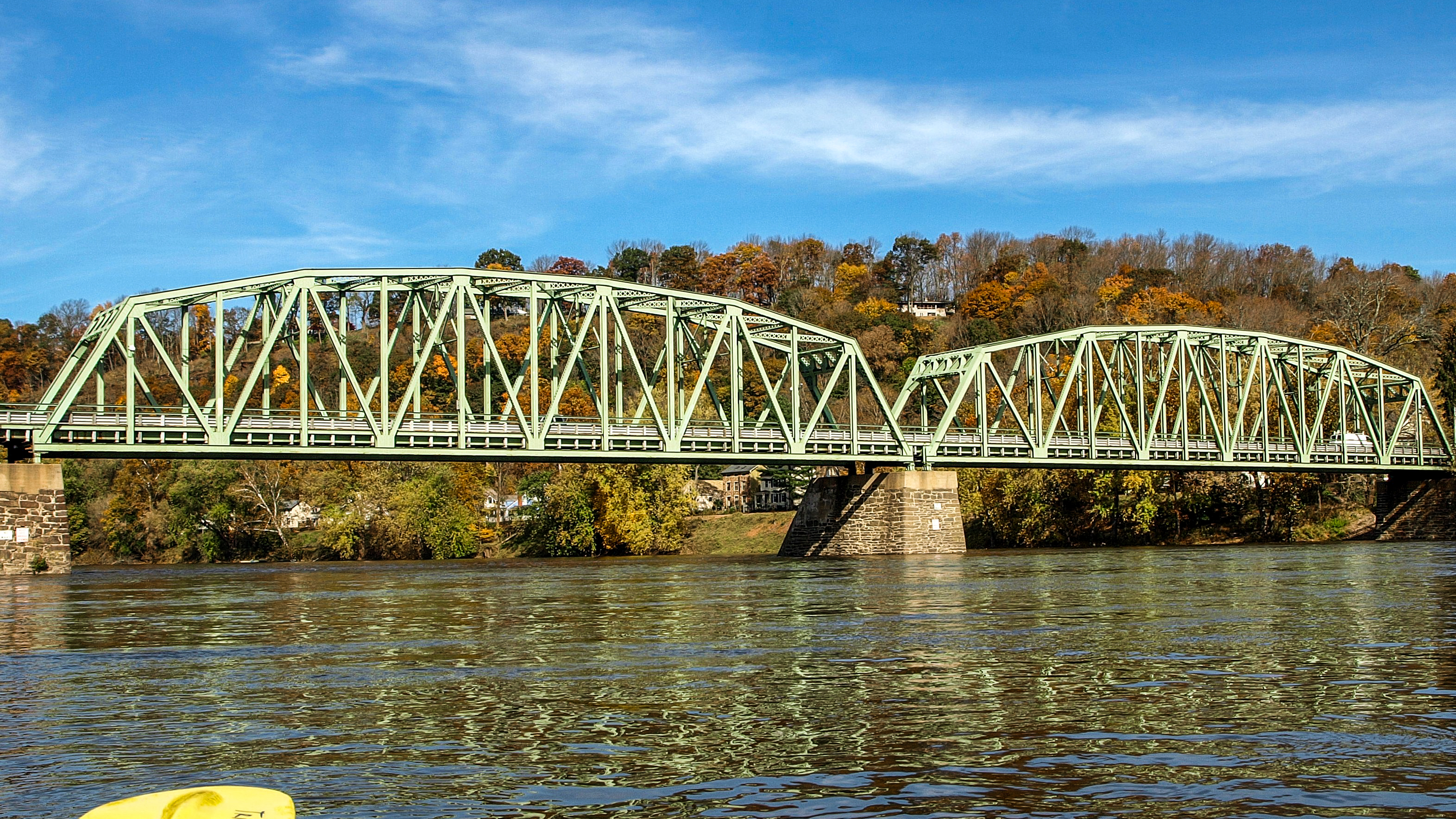
- The Upper Black Eddy–Milford Bridge
- Coordinates: 40.5664°N 75.0986°W
- Carries: Bridge Street
- Crosses: Delaware River
- Locale: Milford, New Jersey and Upper Black Eddy, Pennsylvania
- Maintained by: Delaware River Joint Toll Bridge Commission

Characteristics
- Design: Truss bridge

History
- Opened: January 13, 1934

Statistics
- Toll: None
- Upper Black Eddy–Milford Bridge
- U.S. Historic district – Contributing property
- Part of: Milford Historic District (New Jersey) (ID100006744)
- Designated CP: April 21, 2025

Location
- Interactive map of Upper Black Eddy–Milford Bridge

The Upper Black Eddy–Milford Bridge is a free bridge that crosses over the Delaware River in the United States. Owned and operated by the Delaware River Joint Toll Bridge Commission, it carries Bridge Street, connecting CR 519 in Milford, Hunterdon County, New Jersey, with Pennsylvania Route 32 in Upper Black Eddy, Bucks County, Pennsylvania.

The bridge currently has a 55-ton (49-metric ton) weight limit, the heaviest free bridge on the Delaware.

== History ==
Following a great flood in 1841, a wood-timbered, covered bridge was built in 1842 to accommodate business needs that ferries could not handle. Severely damaged by a subsequent flood in 1903, during which it lost one of its three wooden spans, the bridge was repaired. During its reconstruction, the ferry was put back into service while the bridge was repaired. The wood spans remained in use until replaced by the current steel bridge in 1933; only the stone piers were reused at that time. The bridge charged tolls until 1929.

Two more floods damaged the bridge, including the Flood of 1955 in the aftermath of both Hurricane Connie and Hurricane Diane. The 1955 flood left the bridge under 7 feet (2.1 m) of water; while it did not completely destroy the bridge, it did cause structural damage.

The bridge was added to the National Register of Historic Places on April 21, 2025, as part of the Milford Historic District.

== Gallery ==
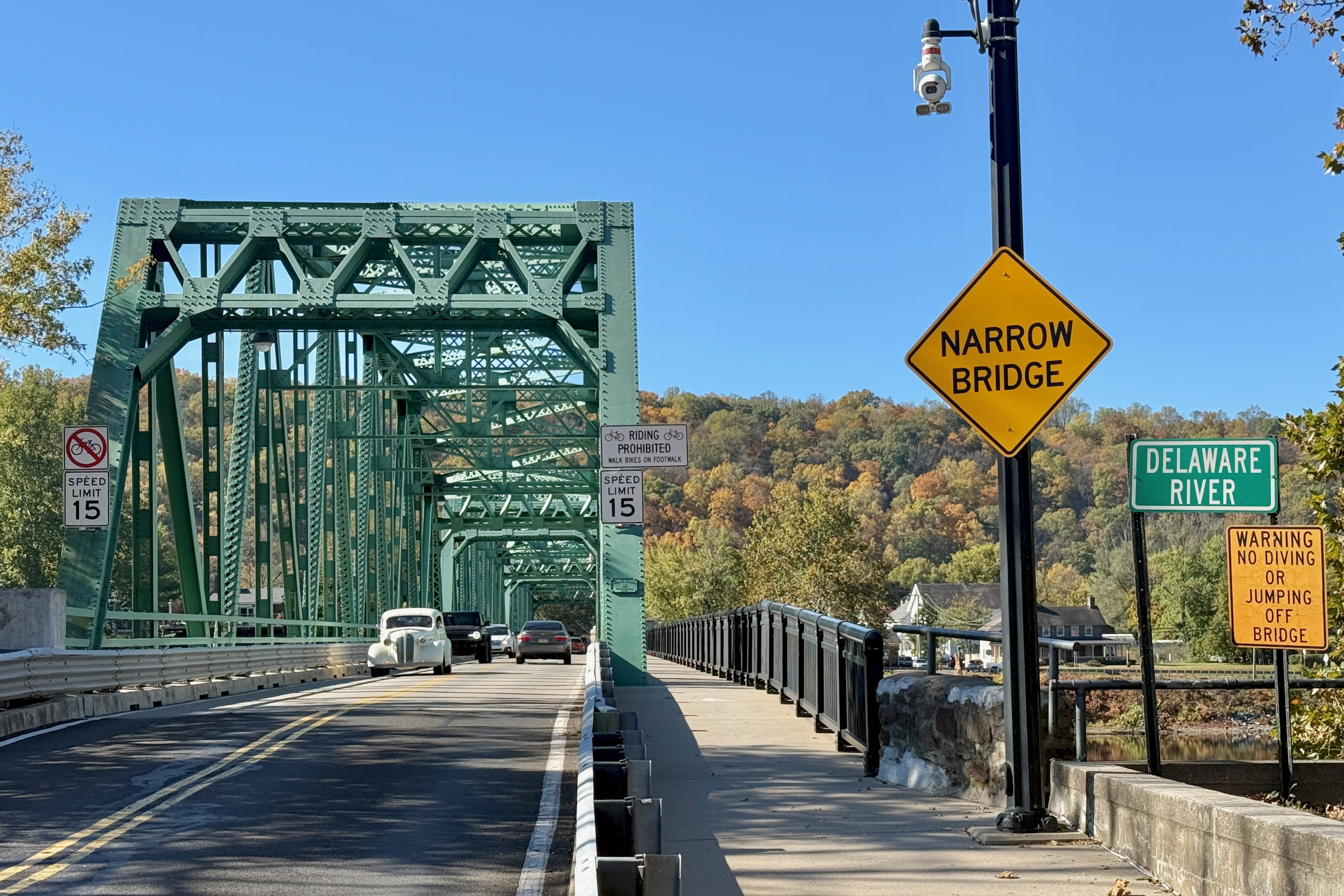
Approach from Milford

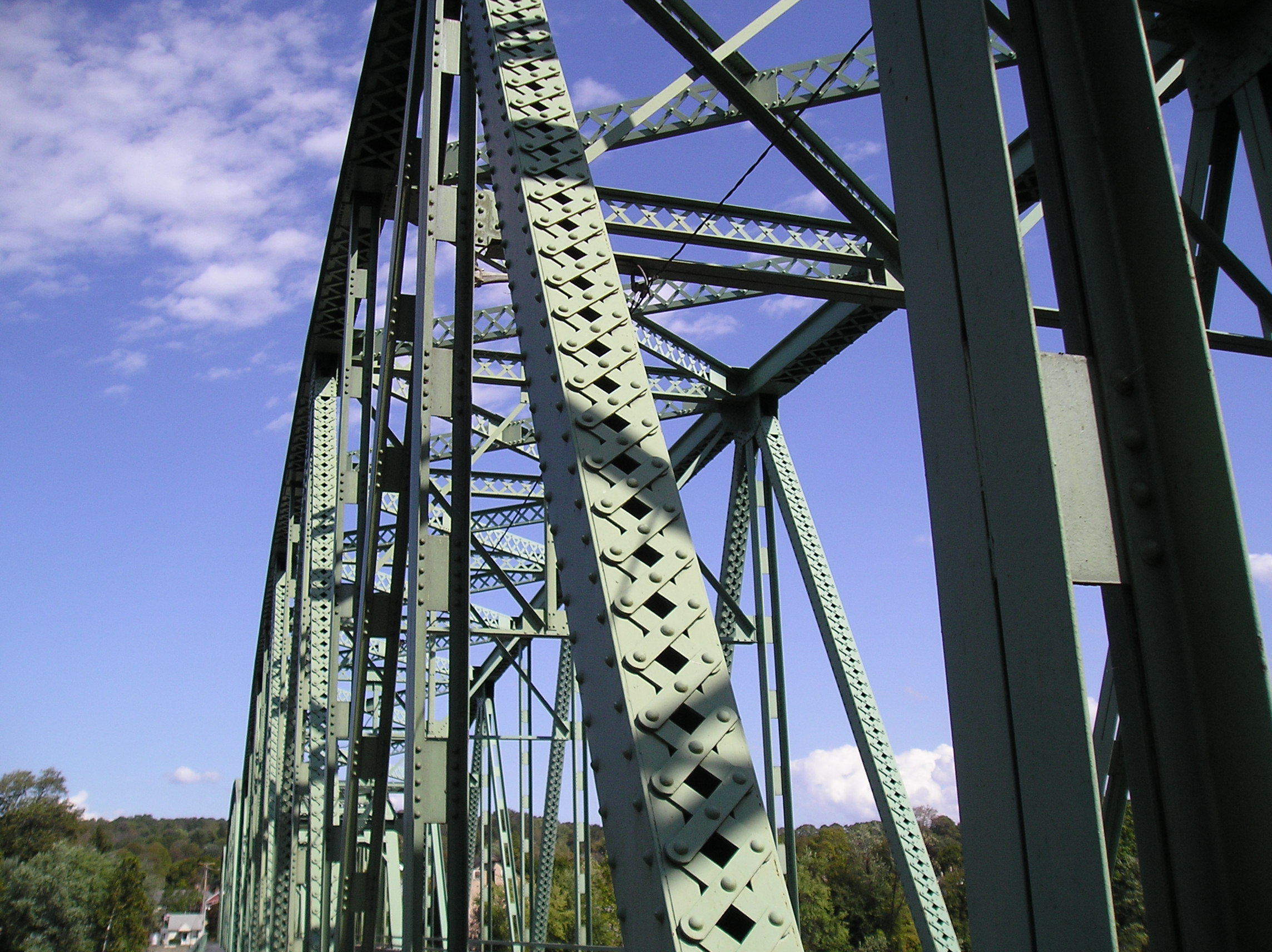
Some structural details of the bridge

== See also ==
- List of bridges on the National Register of Historic Places in New Jersey
- List of crossings of the Delaware River
