= Beneduce Vineyards =

Winery

Coordinates: 40.572459°N 74.975295°W

Beneduce Winery
- Location: 1 Jeremiah Lane, Pittstown, NJ, USA
- Coordinates: 40.572459 N, 74.975295 W
- First vines planted: 2009
- Opened to the public: 2012
- Key people: Michael Beneduce Sr., Michael Beneduce Jr., Justen Beneduce Hiles (owners)
- Area cultivated: 10
- Cases/yr: 4,000 (2014)
- Other attractions: Picnicking permitted
- Distribution: On-site, NJ restaurants, home shipment
- Tasting: Tastings Wednesday to Sunday
- Website: http://beneducevineyards.com/

Beneduce Vineyards (/ˌbɛnəˈduːtʃi/ BEN-ə-DOO-chee) is a winery in the Pittstown section of Alexandria Township in Hunterdon County, New Jersey, United States. A family farm since 2000, the vineyard was first planted in 2009, and opened to the public in 2012. Beneduce has 10 acres of grapes under cultivation, and produces 4,000 cases of wine per year. The winery is named after the family that owns it.

== Wines ==
Beneduce Vineyards primarily grows and produces wine from aromatic varietals, including Blaufränkisch (Lemberger), Cabernet Franc, Cabernet Sauvignon, Chambourcin, Chardonnay, Corot noir, Gewürztraminer, Malbec, Noiret, Pinot noir, Riesling, and Syrah. It is the only winery in New Jersey that produces wine from Noiret, which is a red hybrid grape developed in New York in 1973. Beneduce is not located in one of New Jersey's three viticultural areas.

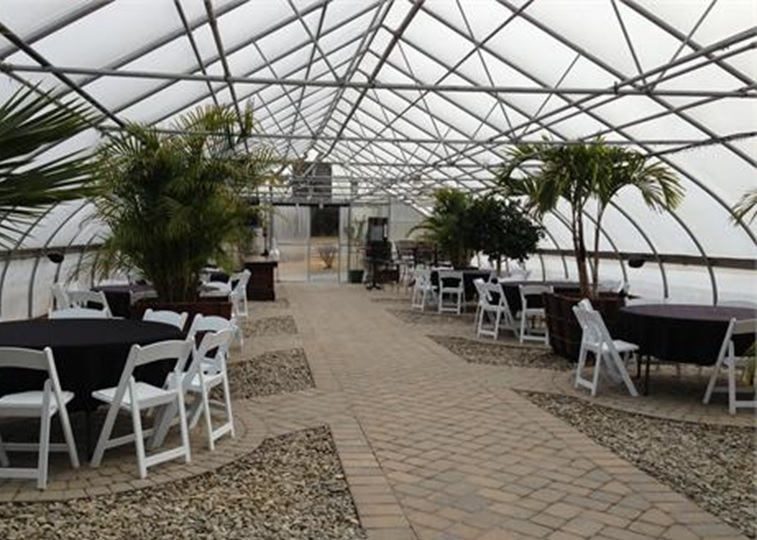
Formerly used for growing plants for a garden center, this greenhouse is now used for hosting special events.

== Licensing and associations ==
Beneduce has a plenary winery license from the New Jersey Division of Alcoholic Beverage Control, which allows it to produce an unrestricted amount of wine, operate up to 15 off-premises sales rooms, and ship up to 12 cases per year to consumers in-state or out-of-state. The winery is a member of the Garden State Wine Growers Association and its subsidiary, Vintage North Jersey.

== See also ==
- Alcohol laws of New Jersey
- American wine
- Judgment of Princeton
- List of wineries, breweries, and distilleries in New Jersey
- New Jersey Farm Winery Act
- New Jersey Wine Industry Advisory Council
- New Jersey wine
