= Milford Historic District (New Jersey) =

- U.S. National Register of Historic Places
- U.S. Historic district
- New Jersey Register of Historic Places
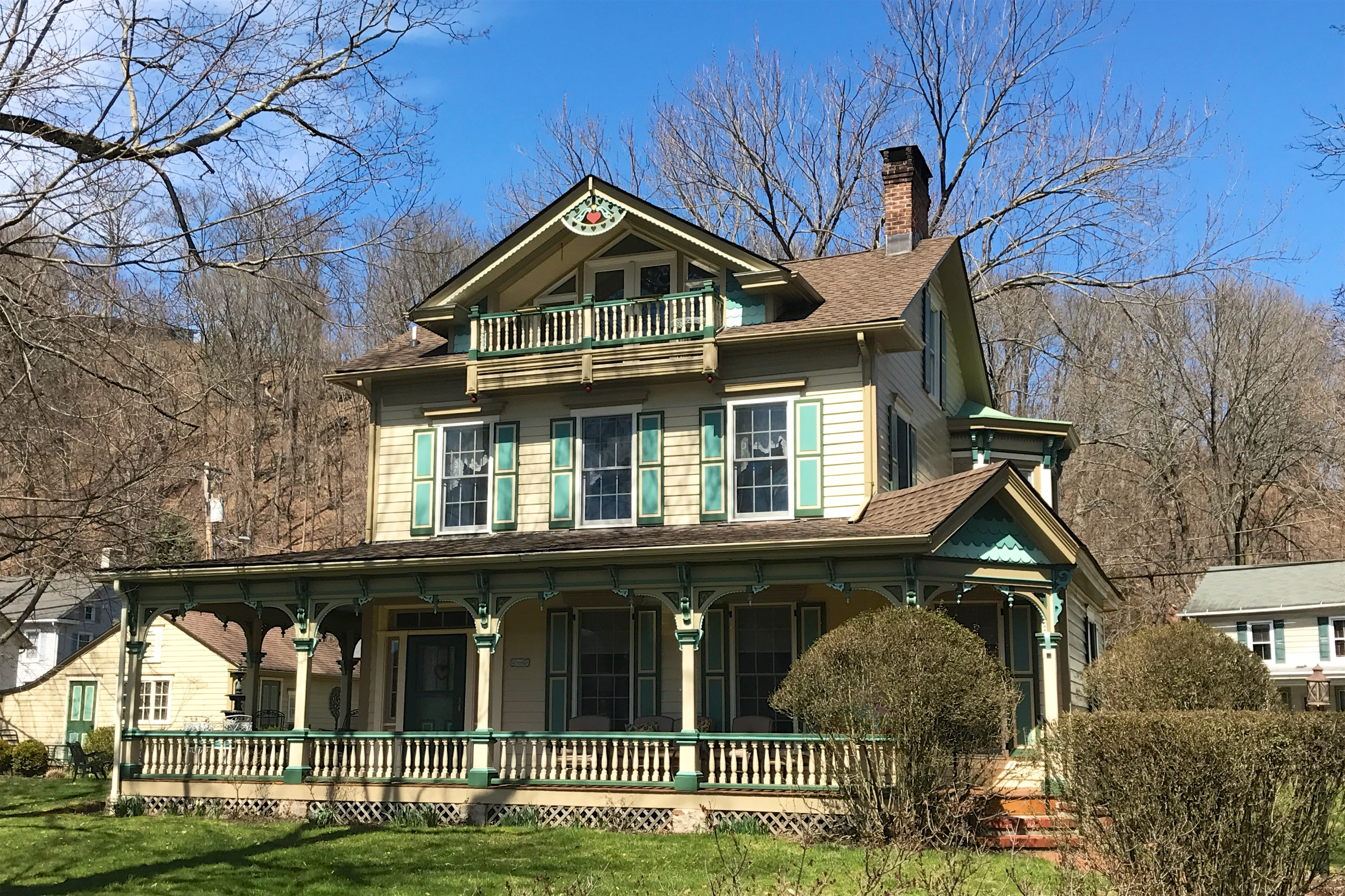
- Italianate house on Spring Garden Street

- Location within Hunterdon County, New Jersey Location within New Jersey Location within the United States
- Location: Bridge, Carpenter, Church, Spring Garden, Green, and Maple Streets, Milford, New Jersey
- Coordinates: 40°34′6″N 75°5′42″W
- NRHP reference No.: 100006744
- NJRHP No.: 5194

Significant dates
- Added to NRHP: April 21, 2025
- Designated NJRHP: March 19, 2025

The Milford Historic District is a 139-acre (56 ha) historic district located along Bridge, Carpenter, Church, Spring Garden, Green, and Maple Streets in the borough of Milford in Hunterdon County, New Jersey, United States. The district was added to the National Register of Historic Places on April 21, 2025, for its significance in community development and industry. The district includes 253 contributing buildings, 7 contributing structures, and 5 contributing sites. The Upper Black Eddy–Milford Bridge is an important contributing property, connecting the community to Upper Black Eddy, Pennsylvania.

== History and description ==
The district's period of significance extends from 1795 to around 1940. In 1842, a wooden bridge was built across the Delaware River, allowing trade access to the Delaware Canal. In the 1850s, construction of the Belvidere Delaware Railroad provided rail access to Trenton. The community was incorporated as a borough in 1911.

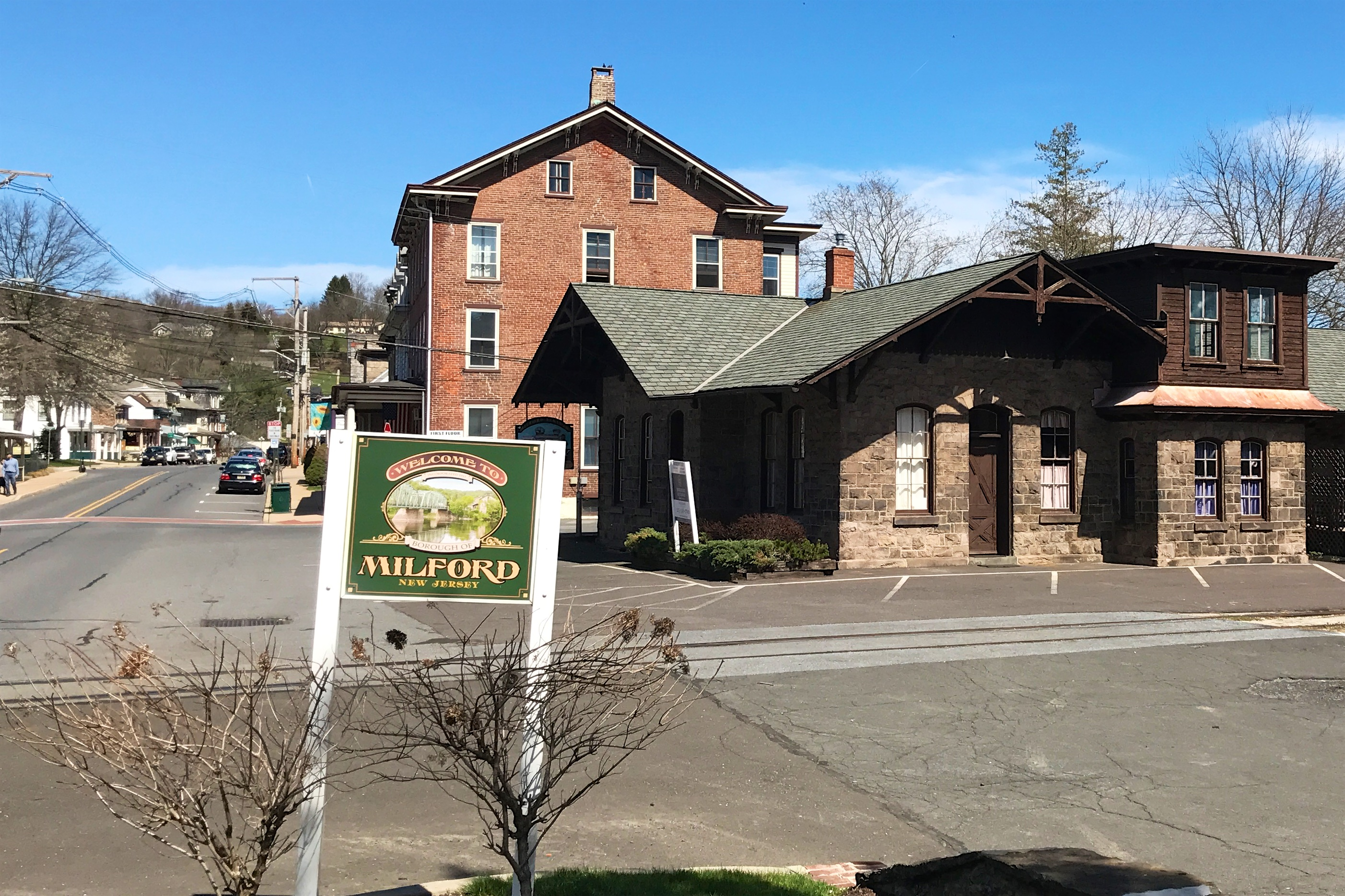
Former station of the Belvidere Delaware Railroad

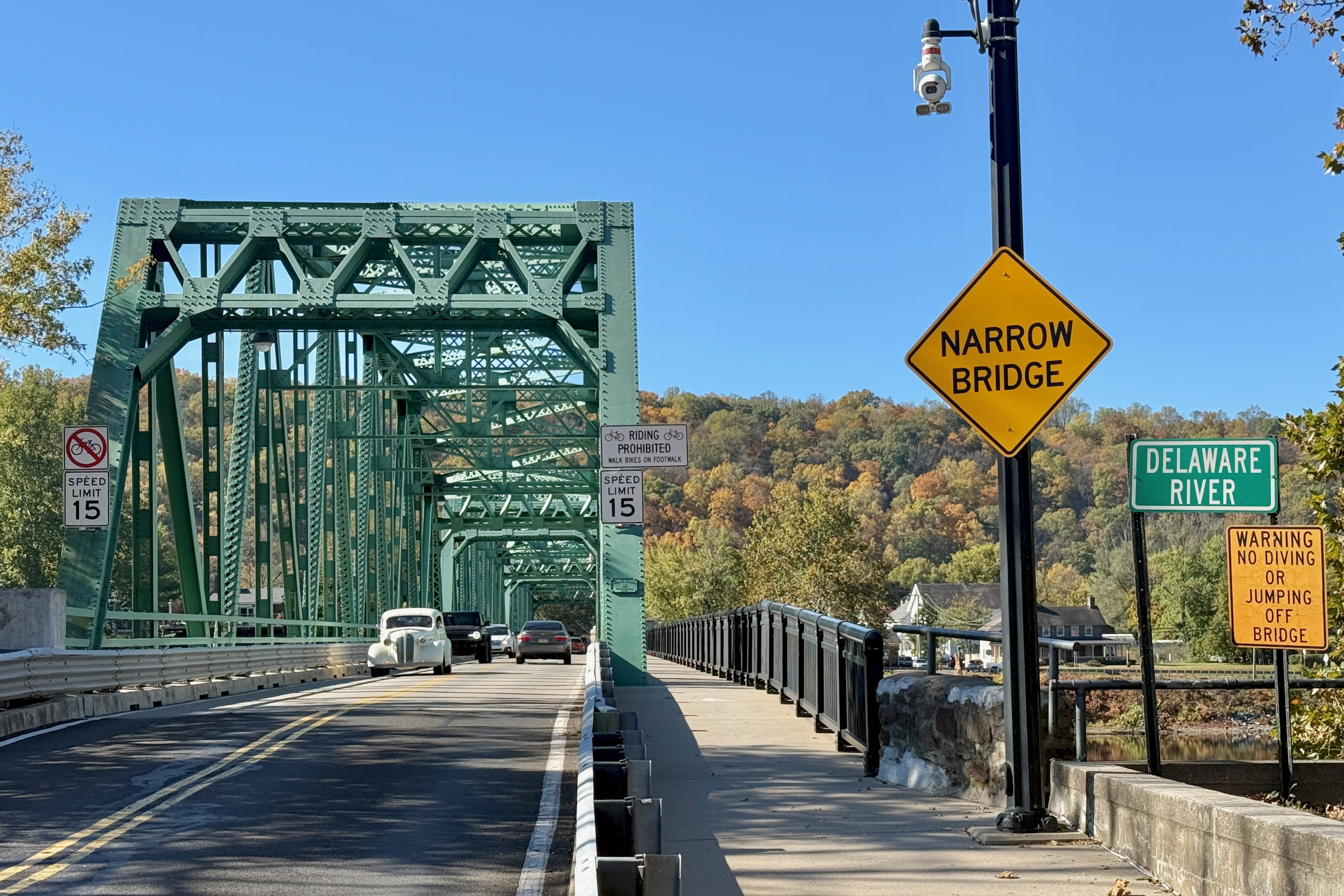
Upper Black Eddy–Milford Bridge approach from Milford

== See also ==
- National Register of Historic Places listings in Hunterdon County, New Jersey
