= Delaware Valley Regional High School =

High school in Hunterdon County, New Jersey, US

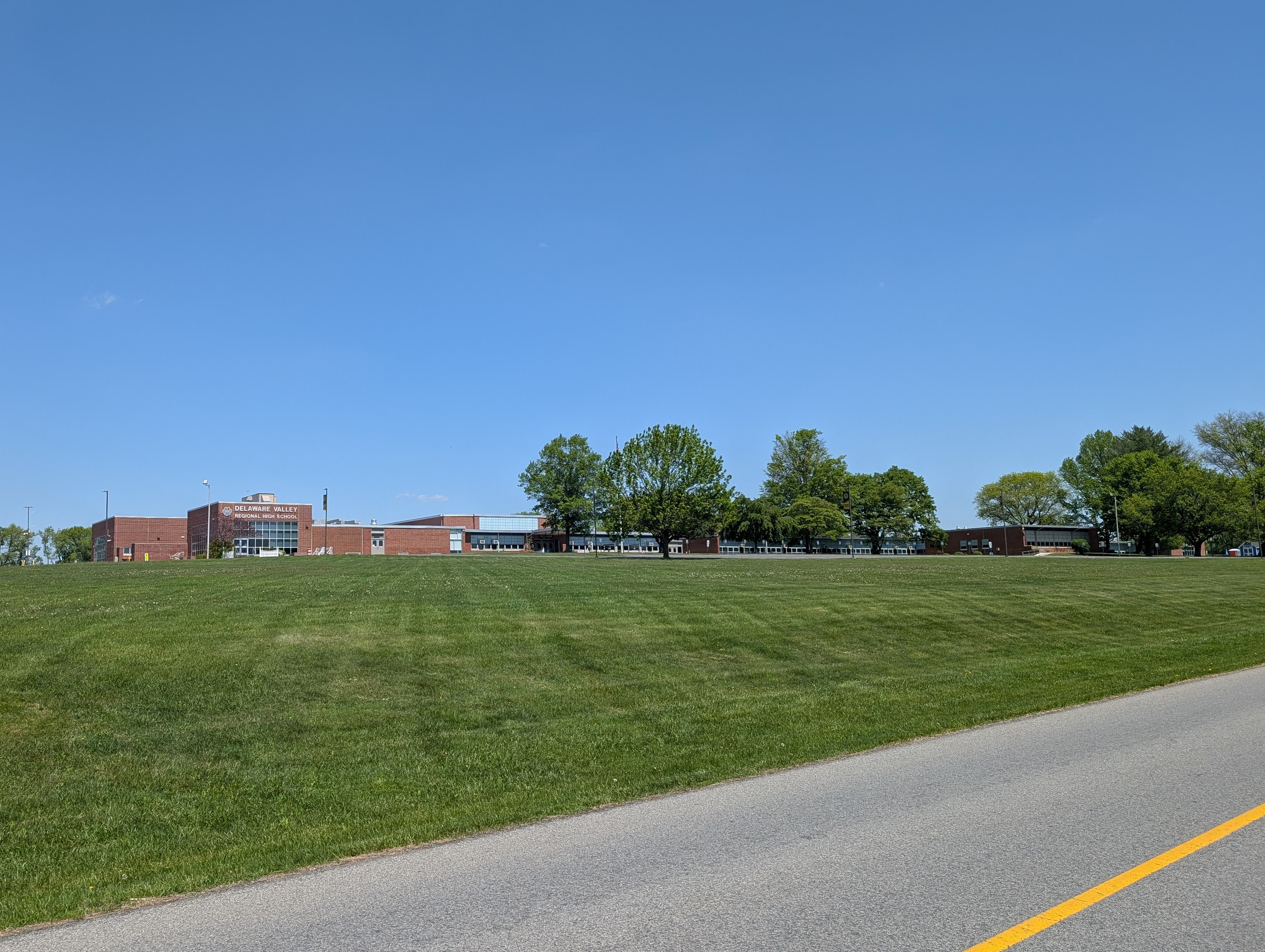

Address
- 19 Senator Stout Road Frenchtown, Hunterdon County, New Jersey, 08825; United States

District information
- Grades: 9th-12th
- Superintendent: Scott McKinney
- Business administrator: Teresa E. O'Brien
- Schools: 1

Students and staff
- Enrollment: 714 (as of 2024–25)
- Faculty: 58.3 FTEs
- Student–teacher ratio: 12.2:1

Other information
- District Factor Group: GH
- Website: www.dvrhs.org
Ind.	Per pupil	District spending	Rank (*)	9-12 average	%± vs. average
1A	Total Spending	$19,791	17	$18,891	4.8%
1	Budgetary Cost	16,335	26	15,592	4.8%
2	Classroom Instruction	8,659	21	8,807	−1.7%
6	Support Services	3,001	40	2,294	30.8%
8	Administrative Cost	1,609	21	1,592	1.1%
10	Operations & Maintenance	1,708	12	1,954	−12.6%
13	Extracurricular Activities	1,357	45	873	55.4%
16	Median Teacher Salary	63,425	14	71,726
Data from NJDoE 2014 Taxpayers' Guide to Education Spending. *Of 9-12 districts with any number of students. Lowest spending=1; Highest=47

Delaware Valley Regional High School

Location
- 40.561579°N 75.009449°W

Information
- Type: Public high school
- Motto: "Cultivating Gold Standards"
- Established: 1959
- NCES School ID: 340375002978
- Principal: Michael Kays
- Faculty: 58.3 FTEs
- Grades: 9-12
- Enrollment: 705 (as of 2024–25)
- Student to teacher ratio: 12.1:1
- Colors: Navy blue and gold
- Athletics conference: Skyland Conference (general); Big Central Football Conference (football)
- Team name: Terriers

Delaware Valley Regional High School is a regional, four-year public high school and school district, that serves students in western Hunterdon County, in the U.S. state of New Jersey. The high school is located in Alexandria Township. Students hail from the townships of Alexandria, Holland and Kingwood along with the boroughs of Frenchtown and Milford.

As of the 2024–25 school year, the school had an enrollment of 705 students and 58.3 classroom teachers (on an FTE basis), for a student–teacher ratio of 12.1:1. There were 76 students (10.8% of enrollment) eligible for free lunch and 14 (2.0% of students) eligible for reduced-cost lunch.

The district had been classified by the New Jersey Department of Education as being in District Factor Group "GH", the third-highest of eight groupings. District Factor Groups organize districts statewide to allow comparison by common socioeconomic characteristics of the local districts. From lowest socioeconomic status to highest, the categories are A, B, CD, DE, FG, GH, I and J.

== History ==
Prior to the school's completion, students from Frenchtown had attended Frenchtown High School, which held its final graduation ceremonies in June 1959.

Constructed at a cost of $1.6 million (equivalent to $17.7 million in 2025) on a 67-acre (27 ha) site, the school opened in September 1959 with 430 students.

== Awards, recognition and rankings ==
The school was the 140th-ranked public high school in New Jersey out of 339 schools statewide in New Jersey Monthly magazine's September 2014 cover story on the state's "Top Public High Schools", using a new ranking methodology. The school had been ranked 131st in the state of 328 schools in 2012, after being ranked 88th in 2010 out of 322 schools listed. The magazine ranked the school 83rd in 2008 out of 316 schools. The school was ranked 80th in the magazine's September 2006 issue, which included 316 schools across the state. Schooldigger.com ranked the school 180th out of 381 public high schools statewide in its 2011 rankings (a decrease of 81 positions from the 2010 ranking) which were based on the combined percentage of students classified as proficient or above proficient on the mathematics (79.4%) and language arts literacy (93.3%) components of the High School Proficiency Assessment (HSPA).

== Athletics ==
The Delaware Valley Regional High School Terriers compete in the Skyland Conference, which is comprised of public and private high schools in Hunterdon, Somerset and Warren counties, and operates under the supervision of the New Jersey State Interscholastic Athletic Association (NJSIAA). With 509 students in grades 10–12, the school was classified by the NJSIAA for the 2019–20 school year as Group II for most athletic competition purposes, which included schools with an enrollment of 486 to 758 students in that grade range. The football team competes in Division 2A of the Big Central Football Conference, which includes 60 public and private high schools in Hunterdon, Middlesex, Somerset, Union and Warren counties, which are broken down into 10 divisions by size and location. The school was classified by the NJSIAA as Group II South for football for 2024–2026, which included schools with 514 to 685 students.

The Del Val wrestling team has had eight individual state champions and 33 individual state placewinners. The team has been the Central Jersey Group II sectional champion 16 times, won two sectional titles in North II Group I, and four titles in Central Jersey Group I. The team has won the New Jersey Group II state championship in 1984, 1985, 1987–1990, 1999 and 2017, and the Group I title in 2022, 2023 and 2025; The program's 11 state titles through 2020 were sixth-most in the state. The 2017 team finished the season with a 23–3 record after defeating Collingswood High School in the semis and moving on to beat Hanover Park High School in the finals 30–28 to win the program's eighth Group II title. The 2022 team knocked off "perennial Group 1 favorite" Paulsboro High School in the semifinals and then defeated Kittatinny Regional High School by a score of 36–23 in the Group I tournament final, to claim the program's ninth state title.

The softball team finished the 1985 season with a 25–2 record after defeating Jefferson Township High School by a score of 3–1 in the final of the playoffs to win the Group II state championship.

The 2000 football team made it to the playoffs for the first time in school history, and posted the up-to-then best record while making it to the semi-final playoff game vs. Manasquan High School where they lost 40–0. The football team made it to the 2007 Central Jersey Group II state sectional tournament, falling to Carteret High School by a score of 13–7. The football team also earned the region title in 2011 and made it to the semi-final round in the state playoffs.

In 2002, the Delaware Valley girls' soccer program won the school's only state championship, led by senior striker Cathy Abel who scored 36 goals while finishing her career with a school-record 82 goals and 52 assists. The team posted a record of 20 wins, 2 losses, and 3 draws on the way to winning the Hunterdon/Warren County Tournament Championship, the Central Jersey Group II Sectional Championship and shared the Group II state championship after a scoreless tie with Indian Hills High School.

The school's boys' and girls' cross-country teams have achieved success in the past few decades. In 2008 the boys' and girls' cross country teams won the Skyland Conference Raritan Division, the boys finishing 9–0 and the girls 7–0. Also in 2008 Julia Mark and Emma Giantisco placed 1st and 3rd at the Group II State Meet and 9th and 15th at the Meet of Champions. In 2009 under former Del Val grad and former boys' assistant coach for the past few years, Dave Giantisco, the Boys' XC Team went undefeated 10–0 bringing its dual meet streak to 20–0. The team won the CJ Group II title for the first time since 1986, placed 2nd at the Group II State Meet and placed 12th at the Meet of Champs. This was the first time the Del Val Boys' team made MoCs since 1975. In 2010, the team extended their dual meet streak to 26–0, won the CJ Group II title again, and took 3rd at Groups, qualifying them for MoCs for back to back years.

The Delaware Valley Regional High School cheerleading team has become one of the most recognized teams in the state and nation. They compete every year in the UCA National Cheerleading Competition in Orlando, Florida. The 2012–2013 team won the National Cheerleading Championship. The 2011–2012 team ended the season with a 5th-place ranking in the UCA National High School Cheerleading championships as well as two New Jersey state championships in Medium Varsity and Group II. The 2010–2011 team was ranked 8th in the nation at the NHSCC. Their 2008–09 varsity team earned a 5th-place ranking at the UCA Nationals, as well as 1st place in The Garden State Open. They have also earned the NJ State Medium Varsity Champions for the 2006–07 and the 2007–2008 seasons. The team earned the Group II state championship title in 2003.

In 2016, the top-ranked Delaware Valley baseball team defeated third-ranked Delran High School in the final game of the South Jersey Group II state sectional tournament by a score of 3–1, earning the program's first sectional title since 1959, advancing them to the Group II state semi-final game against West Deptford High School.

== Superintendent controversy ==
During the 2007–08 school year, district superintendent Robert Walsh was accused of embezzling money from the school. After a trial that lasted over a year, he was imprisoned. The superintendent who followed him, Elizabeth Nastus, made an announcement during the 2008–09 school year addressing this the day after he pleaded guilty of embezzlement of $90,000 to the district courts. The funds were insured through the state, and were later documented and recovered at no cost to local taxpayers.

== Administration ==
Core administration members are:

- Scott McKinney, superintendent
- Teresa E. O'Brien, school business administrator and board secretary
- Michael Kays, principal

== Board of education ==
The district's board of education is comprised of nine members who set policy and oversee the fiscal and educational operation of the district through its administration. As a Type II school district, the board's trustees are elected directly by the voters in the constituent municipalities to serve three-year terms of office on a staggered basis, with three seats up for election each year held (since 2012) as part of the November general election. The board appoints a superintendent to oversee the district's day-to-day operations and a business administrator to supervise the business functions of the district. The nine seats on the board are allocated based on population so that three members are elected from Holland Township, two each from both Alexandria Township and Kingwood Township, and one each from both Frenchtown and Milford.

The district is funded based on the equalized valuation of real property in all of the constituent municipalities. Representatives from Alexandria Township, Kingwood Township and Milford had argued that the each municipality should pay taxes commensurate with the district's cost per pupil multiplied by the number of students sent from each community.

== Notable alumni ==
- Mary DeChambres, film and television editor
- Billy Pauch Jr. (born 1987), professional stock car racing driver
