= Holland Township, New Jersey =

Township in Hunterdon County, New Jersey, US

- Township
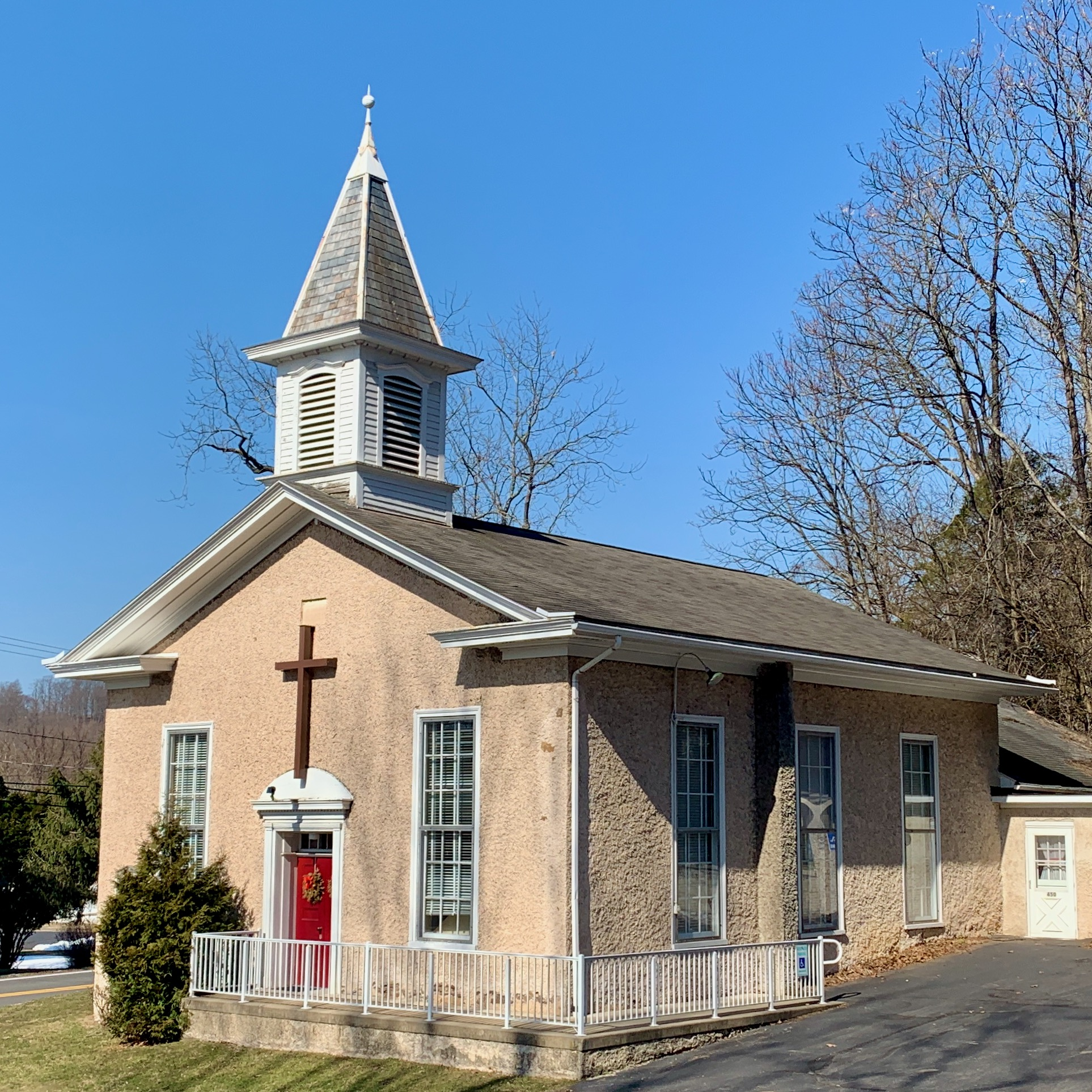
- Holland Presbyterian Church, built 1849

- Wordmark

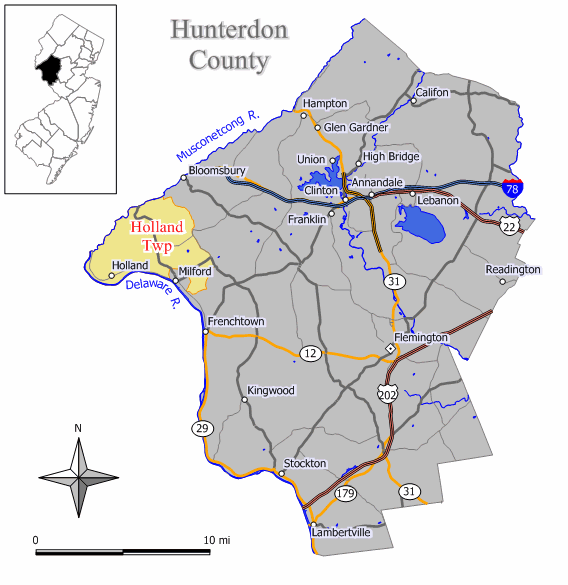
- Location of Holland Township in Hunterdon County highlighted in yellow (right). Inset map: Location of Hunterdon County in New Jersey highlighted in black (left).

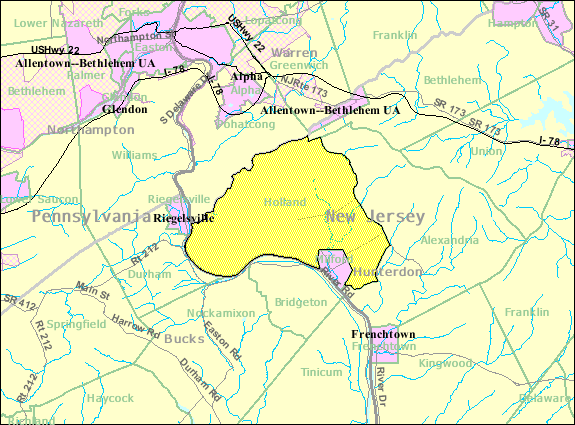
- Census Bureau map of Holland Township, New Jersey

- Location in Hunterdon County Location in New Jersey Location in the United States
- Coordinates: 40.598039°N 75.124165°W
- Country: United States
- State: New Jersey
- County: Hunterdon
- Incorporated: April 13, 1874

Government
  - Type: Township
  - Body: Township Committee
  - Mayor: Daniel Bush (R, term ends December 31, 2023)
  - Municipal clerk: Melissa S. Tigar

Area
  - Total: 23.97 sq mi (62.08 km^{2})
  - Land: 23.47 sq mi (60.78 km^{2})
  - Water: 0.50 sq mi (1.30 km^{2}) 2.09%
  - Rank: 116th of 565 in state 10th of 26 in county
- Elevation: 381 ft (116 m)

Population (2020)
  - Total: 5,177
  - Estimate (2023): 5,208
  - Rank: 372nd of 565 in state 7th of 26 in county
  - Density: 220.6/sq mi (85.2/km^{2})
  - Rank: 498th of 565 in state 17th of 26 in county
- Time zone: UTC−05:00 (Eastern (EST))
  - Summer (DST): UTC−04:00 (Eastern (EDT))
- ZIP Codes: 08804 – Bloomsbury; 08848 – Milford
- Area code: 908
- FIPS code: 3401932460
- GNIS feature ID: 0882185
- Website: www.hollandtownshipnj.gov

Holland Township is a township in Hunterdon County, in the U.S. state of New Jersey. As of the 2020 United States census, the township's population was 5,177, a decrease of 114 (−2.2%) from the 2010 census count of 5,291, which in turn reflected an increase of 167 (+3.3%) from the 5,124 counted in the 2000 census.

Holland Township is located in the northwestern part of Hunterdon County. The Delaware River forms its boundary with Pennsylvania and the Musconetcong River its boundary with Warren County. It was created from Alexandria Township on April 13, 1874, before being dissolved and reabsorbed into Alexandria Township on March 4, 1878. The township was reformed and separated as a municipality of its own again on March 11, 1879. Milford was created on April 15, 1911, from portions of Holland Township, based on the results of a referendum held on May 8, 1911. The township was named by Dutch settlers for Holland.

== Geography ==
According to the United States Census Bureau, the township had a total area of 23.97 square miles (62.08 km^{2}), including 23.47 square miles (60.78 km^{2}) of land and 0.50 square miles (1.30 km^{2}) of water (2.09%).

The township borders the municipalities of Alexandria Township, Bethlehem Township and Milford in Hunterdon County; Pohatcong Township in Warren County; and Bridgeton Township, Durham Township, Nockamixon Township and Riegelsville in Bucks County across the Delaware River in the Commonwealth of Pennsylvania.

Unincorporated communities, localities and place names located partially or completely within the township include Amsterdam, Finesville, Hughesville, Little York, Mount Joy, Riegel Ridge, Spring Mills and Warren Paper Mills.

== Demographics ==
Historical population
Census	Pop.	Note	%±
1880	1,886		—
1890	1,704		−9.7%
1900	1,652		−3.1%
1910	1,699		2.8%
1920	911	*	−46.4%
1930	994		9.1%
1940	1,150		15.7%
1950	1,341		16.6%
1960	2,495		86.1%
1970	3,587		43.8%
1980	4,593		28.0%
1990	4,892		6.5%
2000	5,124		4.7%
2010	5,291		3.3%
2020	5,177		−2.2%
2023 (est.)	5,208		0.6%
Population sources: 1880–1920 1880–1890; 1890–1910 1910–1930; 1940–2000 2000; 2010 2020 * = Lost territory in previous decade.

=== 2010 census ===
The 2010 United States census counted 5,291 people, 1,972 households, and 1,544 families in the township. The population density was 225.0 inhabitants per square mile (86.9/km^{2}). There were 2,066 housing units at an average density of 87.9 per square mile (33.9/km^{2}). The racial makeup was 97.62% (5,165) White, 0.72% (38) Black or African American, 0.06% (3) Native American, 0.77% (41) Asian, 0.04% (2) Pacific Islander, 0.28% (15) from other races, and 0.51% (27) from two or more races. Hispanic or Latino of any race were 2.68% (142) of the population.

Of the 1,972 households, 34.0% had children under the age of 18; 68.8% were married couples living together; 6.9% had a female householder with no husband present and 21.7% were non-families. Of all households, 18.1% were made up of individuals and 9.0% had someone living alone who was 65 years of age or older. The average household size was 2.68 and the average family size was 3.06.

24.1% of the population were under the age of 18, 6.1% from 18 to 24, 20.5% from 25 to 44, 33.3% from 45 to 64, and 16.0% who were 65 years of age or older. The median age was 44.5 years. For every 100 females, the population had 96.7 males. For every 100 females ages 18 and older there were 92.8 males.

The Census Bureau's 2006–2010 American Community Survey showed that (in 2010 inflation-adjusted dollars) median household income was $85,190 (with a margin of error of +/− $11,358) and the median family income was $99,535 (+/− $16,553). Males had a median income of $77,951 (+/− $14,766) versus $56,719 (+/− $14,287) for females. The per capita income for the borough was $43,162 (+/− $5,210). About 1.9% of families and 3.2% of the population were below the poverty line, including 3.6% of those under age 18 and none of those age 65 or over.

=== 2000 census ===
As of the 2000 United States census there were 5,124 people, 1,881 households, and 1,523 families residing in the township. The population density was 216.2 inhabitants per square mile (83.5/km^{2}). There were 1,942 housing units at an average density of 81.9 per square mile (31.6/km^{2}). The racial makeup of the township was 98.09% White, 0.43% African American, 0.04% Native American, 0.43% Asian, 0.39% from other races, and 0.62% from two or more races. Hispanic or Latino of any race were 1.70% of the population.

There were 1,881 households, out of which 33.3% had children under the age of 18 living with them, 73.2% were married couples living together, 5.2% had a female householder with no husband present, and 19.0% were non-families. 15.5% of all households were made up of individuals, and 7.7% had someone living alone who was 65 years of age or older. The average household size was 2.72 and the average family size was 3.06.

In the township the population was spread out, with 24.7% under the age of 18, 5.6% from 18 to 24, 26.8% from 25 to 44, 28.4% from 45 to 64, and 14.5% who were 65 years of age or older. The median age was 41 years. For every 100 females, there were 97.7 males. For every 100 females age 18 and over, there were 95.1 males.

The median income for a household in the township was $68,083, and the median income for a family was $71,925. Males had a median income of $50,737 versus $35,615 for females. The per capita income for the township was $28,581. About 1.6% of families and 2.2% of the population were below the poverty line, including 2.9% of those under age 18 and 3.3% of those age 65 or over.

== Parks and recreation ==
The 523-acre (2.12 km^{2}) Musconetcong Gorge Nature Preserve is an undeveloped park managed by the Hunterdon County Parks and Recreational System, with steeply wooded terrain overlooking the Musconetcong River. The gorge includes many spring-fed streams, a variety of plant species and wildlife. While much of the area offers challenging hikes, a variety of trails are being developed to offer access to less-seasoned hikers.

== Government ==
=== Local government ===
Holland Township is governed under the Township form of government, one of 141 municipalities (of the 564) statewide that use this form. The Township Committee is comprised of five members, who are elected directly by the voters at-large in partisan elections to serve three-year terms of office on a staggered basis, with either one or two seats coming up for election each year as part of the November general election in a three-year cycle. At an annual reorganization meeting, the Township Committee selects one of its members to serve as Mayor.

As of 2023, members of the Holland Township Committee are Mayor Daniel T. Bush (R, term on committee ends December 31, 2024; term as mayor ends 2023), Deputy Mayor Scott M. Wilhelm (R, term on committee ends 2025; term as deputy mayor ends 2023), Lisa Pezzano Mickey (R, 2023), Robert H. Thurgarland (R, 2025) and Duane C. Young (R, 2023; elected to serve an unexpired term).

In January 2022, the Township Council appointed Duane Young to fill the seat that expires in December 2022 that had been held by Ray Krov until his resignation that became effective earlier that month. Young served on an interim basis until the November 2022 general election, when he was chosen to serve the balance of the term of office.

In April 2019, the Township Committee selected Lisa Mickey from a list of three candidates nominated by the Republican municipal committee to the fill the seat expiring in December 2020 that had been held by Thomas Scheibener until he resigned from office earlier that month.

In March 2016, the Township Committee selected Robert Thurgarland from three candidates nominated by the Republican municipal committee to fill the term expiring December 2016 of Tony Roselle, who had resigned from office the previous month.

=== Federal, state and county representation ===
Holland Township is located in the 7th Congressional District and is part of New Jersey's 23rd state legislative district.

For the 119th United States Congress, New Jersey's 7th congressional district is represented by Thomas Kean Jr. (R, Westfield). New Jersey is represented in the United States Senate by Democrats Cory Booker (Newark, term ends 2027) and Andy Kim (Moorestown, term ends 2031).

For the 2026–2027 session, the 23rd legislative district of the New Jersey Legislature is represented in the State Senate by Doug Steinhardt (R, Lopatcong Township) and in the General Assembly by John DiMaio (R, Hackettstown) and Erik Peterson (R, Franklin Township).

Hunterdon County is governed by a Board of County Commissioners comprised of five members who are elected at-large on a partisan basis to serve three-year terms of office on a staggered basis, with either one or two seats up for election each year as part of the November general election. At an annual reorganization meeting held each January, the commissioners select one member to serve as the board's Director and another to serve as Deputy Director, each for a one-year term. As of 2025, Hunterdon County's Commissioners are Director John E. Lanza (R; Raritan Township, 2025), Deputy Director Shaun C. Van Doren (R; Tewksbury Township, 2026), Jeff Kuhl (R; Raritan Township, 2027), Zachary T. Rich (R; West Amwell Township, 2025) and Susan Soloway (R; Franklin Township, 2027).

Constitutional officers elected on a countywide basis are Clerk Mary H. Melfi (R; Flemington, 2026), Sheriff Fredrick W. Brown (R; Alexandria Township, 2025) and Surrogate Heidi Rohrbach (R; Lebanon Township, 2028).

=== Politics ===
As of March 2011, there were a total of 3,699 registered voters in Holland Township, of which 669 (18.1%) were registered as Democrats, 1,537 (41.6%) were registered as Republicans and 1,490 (40.3%) were registered as Unaffiliated. There were 3 voters registered as Libertarians or Greens.

Gubernatorial election results for Holland Township
Year	Republican		Democratic		Third party(ies)	
Year	No.	%	No.	%	No.	%
2025	1,671	60.17%	1,084	39.03%	22	0.79%
2021	1,601	66.02%	801	33.03%	23	0.95%
2017	1,157	65.59%	566	32.09%	41	2.32%
2013	1,453	75.76%	435	22.68%	30	1.56%
2009	1,478	65.89%	551	24.57%	214	9.54%
2005	1,109	62.66%	550	31.07%	111	6.27%

In the 2012 presidential election, Republican Mitt Romney received 60.8% of the vote (1,680 cast), ahead of Democrat Barack Obama with 37.7% (1,041 votes), and other candidates with 1.6% (43 votes), among the 2,785 ballots cast by the township's 3,867 registered voters (21 ballots were spoiled), for a turnout of 72.0%. In the 2008 presidential election, Republican John McCain received 57.5% of the vote (1,698 cast), ahead of Democrat Barack Obama with 39.9% (1,180 votes) and other candidates with 1.6% (48 votes), among the 2,955 ballots cast by the township's 3,723 registered voters, for a turnout of 79.4%. In the 2004 presidential election, Republican George W. Bush received 62.9% of the vote (1,805 ballots cast), outpolling Democrat John Kerry with 36.1% (1,036 votes) and other candidates with 1.1% (38 votes), among the 2,871 ballots cast by the township's 3,612 registered voters, for a turnout percentage of 79.5.

United States presidential election results for Holland Township
Year	Republican		Democratic		Third party(ies)	
Year	No.	%	No.	%	No.	%
2024	2,136	61.61%	1,274	36.75%	57	1.64%
2020	2,128	60.32%	1,323	37.50%	77	2.18%
2016	1,927	63.89%	941	31.20%	148	4.91%
2012	1,680	60.78%	1,041	37.66%	43	1.56%
2008	1,698	58.03%	1,180	40.33%	48	1.64%
2004	1,805	62.70%	1,036	35.98%	38	1.32%

In the 2013 gubernatorial election, Republican Chris Christie received 74.4% of the vote (1,353 cast), ahead of Democrat Barbara Buono with 23.9% (435 votes), and other candidates with 1.7% (30 votes), among the 1,849 ballots cast by the township's 3,836 registered voters (31 ballots were spoiled), for a turnout of 48.2%. In the 2009 gubernatorial election, Republican Chris Christie received 65.0% of the vote (1,478 ballots cast), ahead of Democrat Jon Corzine with 24.2% (551 votes), Independent Chris Daggett with 8.4% (192 votes) and other candidates with 1.0% (22 votes), among the 2,274 ballots cast by the township's 3,693 registered voters, yielding a 61.6% turnout.

United States Senate election results for Holland Township1
Year	Republican		Democratic		Third party(ies)	
Year	No.	%	No.	%	No.	%
2024	1,985	60.85%	1,187	36.39%	90	2.76%
2018	1,635	63.57%	832	32.35%	105	4.08%
2012	1,516	59.40%	930	36.44%	106	4.15%
2006	999	58.01%	633	36.76%	90	5.23%

United States Senate election results for Holland Township2
Year	Republican		Democratic		Third party(ies)	
Year	No.	%	No.	%	No.	%
2020	2,094	61.00%	1,248	36.35%	91	2.65%
2014	844	62.47%	464	34.34%	43	3.18%
2013	740	66.73%	360	32.46%	9	0.81%
2008	1,777	65.31%	851	31.28%	93	3.42%

== Education ==
The Holland Township School District serves public school students in pre-kindergarten through eighth grade at Holland Township Elementary School. As of the 2023–24 school year, the district, comprised of one school, had an enrollment of 510 students and 62.5 classroom teachers (on an FTE basis), for a student–teacher ratio of 8.2:1.

Students in public school for ninth through twelfth grades attend Delaware Valley Regional High School, together with students from Alexandria Township, Frenchtown, Kingwood Township and Milford. As of the 2023–24 school year, the high school had an enrollment of 692 students and 61.5 classroom teachers (on an FTE basis), for a student–teacher ratio of 11.3:1. Seats on the high school district's nine-member board of education are allocated based on the population of the constituent municipalities, with three seats assigned to Holland Township.

Eighth grade students from all of Hunterdon County are eligible to apply to attend the high school programs offered by the Hunterdon County Vocational School District, a county-wide vocational school district that offers career and technical education at its campuses in Raritan Township and at programs sited at local high schools, with no tuition charged to students for attendance.

== Transportation ==
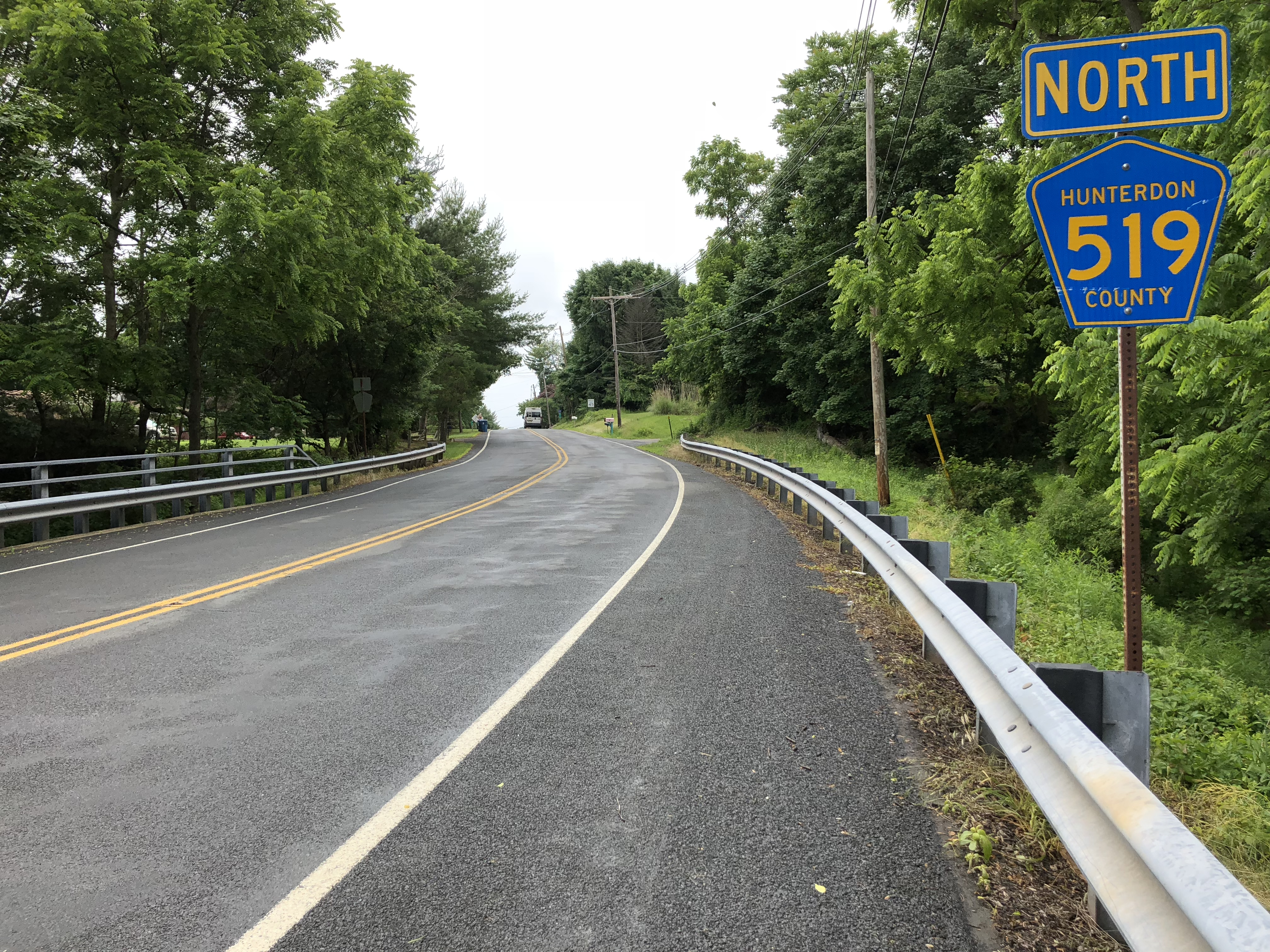
CR 519 in Holland Township

As of May 2010, the township had a total of 62.58 miles (100.71 km) of roadways, of which 45.73 miles (73.60 km) were maintained by the municipality and 16.85 miles (27.12 km) by Hunterdon County.

The only major road that passes through the township is County Route 519.

The closest limited access road is Interstate 78/U.S. Route 22 ("Phillipsburg-Newark Expressway") in neighboring Pohatcong Township in Warren County.

== References in fiction ==
In the 1984 film The Adventures of Buckaroo Banzai Across the 8th Dimension, Holland Township is the location of the Banzai Institute for Biomedical Research and Strategic Information.

== Notable people ==
People who were born in, residents of, or otherwise closely associated with Holland Township include:

- Connie Myers (born 1944), politicians who served in the New Jersey General Assembly from 1996 to 2006, where she represented the 23rd Legislative District

== Landmarks ==
The Volendam Windmill Museum is a working mill driven by wind, used for grinding raw grain into flour. The 60-foot (18 m) structure is seven stories high with sail arms 68 feet (21 m) from tip to tip, having been designed and constructed in 1965 by Paul and May Jorgenson, using windmills they had seen in Denmark and the Netherlands as models. The windmill is located on the 127-acre (51 ha) Charlie Brown Christmas Tree Farm, a property that has been preserved, though the windmill itself is not part of the preservation agreement.
