= Alexandria Township, New Jersey =

Township in Hunterdon County, New Jersey, US

- Township
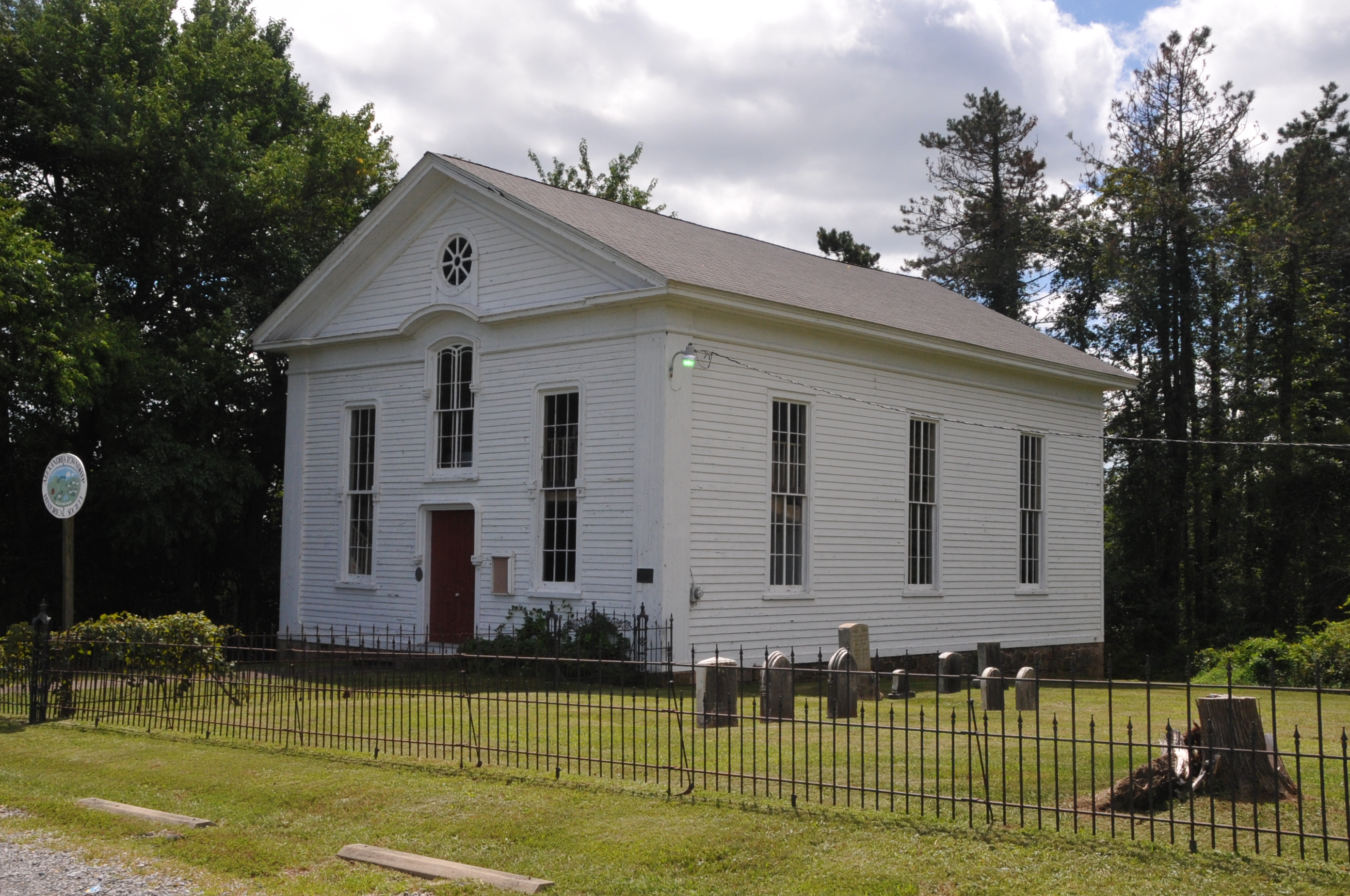
- Alexandria Township Historical Museum

- Seal

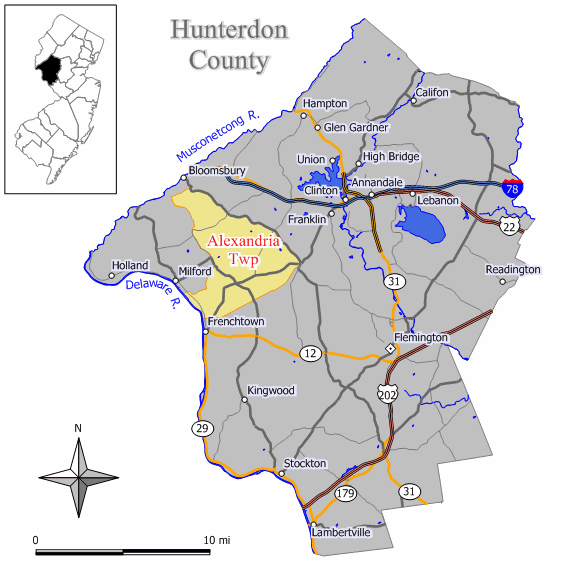
- Location of Alexandria Township in Hunterdon County highlighted in yellow (right). Inset map: Location of Hunterdon County in New Jersey highlighted in black (left).

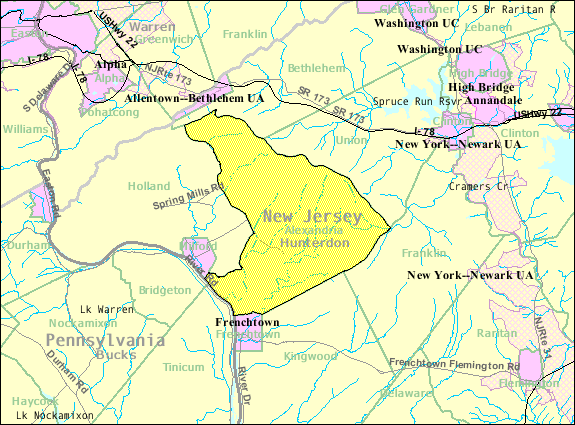
- Census Bureau map of Alexandria Township, New Jersey

- Location in Hunterdon County Location in New Jersey Location in the United States
- Coordinates: 40.594532°N 75.026566°W
- Country: United States
- State: New Jersey
- County: Hunterdon
- Royal charter: March 5, 1765
- Incorporated: February 21, 1798
- Named for: James Alexander

Government
  - Type: Township
  - Body: Township Committee
  - Mayor: Jim Kiernan (R, term ends December 31, 2024)
  - Municipal clerk: Michele Bobrowski

Area
  - Total: 27.75 sq mi (71.87 km^{2})
  - Land: 27.53 sq mi (71.31 km^{2})
  - Water: 0.22 sq mi (0.56 km^{2}) 0.79%
  - Rank: 98th of 565 in state 9th of 26 in county
- Elevation: 404 ft (123 m)

Population (2020)
  - Total: 4,809
  - Estimate (2023): 4,817
  - Rank: 385th of 565 in state 9th of 26 in county
  - Density: 174.7/sq mi (67.5/km^{2})
  - Rank: 513th of 565 in state 21st of 26 in county
- Time zone: UTC−05:00 (Eastern (EST))
  - Summer (DST): UTC−04:00 (Eastern (EDT))
- ZIP Code: 08848 – Milford; 08867 – Pittstown
- Area code: 908
- FIPS code: 3401900550
- GNIS feature ID: 0882186
- Website: www.alexandrianj.gov

Alexandria Township is a township in Hunterdon County, in the U.S. state of New Jersey. As of the 2020 United States census, the township's population was 4,809, a decrease of 129 (−2.6%) from the 2010 census count of 4,938, which in turn reflected an increase of 240 (+5.1%) from the 4,698 counted in the 2000 census.

Alexandria was formed by Royal charter on March 5, 1765, from portions of Bethlehem Township, and was incorporated as one of New Jersey's initial 104 townships by an act of the New Jersey Legislature on February 21, 1798. Portions of the township were taken to form Frenchtown (April 4, 1867) and Holland Township (April 13, 1874, restored to Alexandria on March 4, 1878, and recreated on March 11, 1879). The township was named for James Alexander, a surveyor who served as New Jersey Attorney General and who had acquired 10,000 acres (4,000 ha) of land in the area in 1744.

== Geography ==
According to the United States Census Bureau, the township had a total area of 27.75 square miles (71.87 km^{2}), including 27.53 square miles (71.31 km^{2}) of land and 0.22 square miles (0.56 km^{2}) of water (0.79%).

Unincorporated communities, localities and place names located partially or completely within the township include Everittstown, Little York, Mechlings Corner, Mount Pleasant, Mount Salem, Palmyra and Swinesburg. Pittstown is an unincorporated community that is also spread across Franklin Township and Union Township.

The township borders the municipalities of Bethlehem Township, Franklin Township, Frenchtown, Holland Township, Kingwood Township, Milford and Union Township in Hunterdon County; and both Bridgeton Township and Tinicum Township in Bucks County across the Delaware River border with Pennsylvania.

== Demographics ==
Historical population
Census	Pop.	Note	%±
1790	1,503		—
1810	2,271		—
1820	2,619		15.3%
1830	3,042		16.2%
1840	3,420		12.4%
1850	3,811		11.4%
1860	4,088		7.3%
1870	3,341	*	−18.3%
1880	1,324	*	−60.4%
1890	1,250		−5.6%
1900	1,045		−16.4%
1910	1,045		0.0%
1920	938	*	−10.2%
1930	1,094		16.6%
1940	1,186		8.4%
1950	1,369		15.4%
1960	1,629		19.0%
1970	2,127		30.6%
1980	2,798		31.5%
1990	3,594		28.4%
2000	4,698		30.7%
2010	4,938		5.1%
2020	4,809		−2.6%
2023 (est.)	4,817		0.2%
Population sources: 1790–1920; 1840 1850–1870 1850; 1870 1880–1890 1890–1910; 1910–1930 1940–2000; 2000 2010 2020 * = Lost territory in previous decade.

=== 2010 census ===
The 2010 United States census counted 4,938 people, 1,758 households, and 1,384 families in the township. The population density was 180.1 inhabitants per square mile (69.5/km^{2}). There were 1,865 housing units at an average density of 68.0 per square mile (26.3/km^{2}). The racial makeup was 94.80% (4,681) White, 2.00% (99) Black or African American, 0.04% (2) Native American, 1.82% (90) Asian, 0.02% (1) Pacific Islander, 0.63% (31) from other races, and 0.69% (34) from two or more races. Hispanic or Latino of any race were 3.22% (159) of the population.

Of the 1,758 households, 35.7% had children under the age of 18; 71.4% were married couples living together; 5.3% had a female householder with no husband present and 21.3% were non-families. Of all households, 16.7% were made up of individuals and 7.5% had someone living alone who was 65 years of age or older. The average household size was 2.78 and the average family size was 3.16.

25.5% of the population were under the age of 18, 6.5% from 18 to 24, 16.8% from 25 to 44, 38.5% from 45 to 64, and 12.6% who were 65 years of age or older. The median age was 45.5 years. For every 100 females, the population had 99.7 males. For every 100 females ages 18 and older there were 95.9 males.

The Census Bureau's 2006–2010 American Community Survey showed that (in 2010 inflation-adjusted dollars) median household income was $117,404 (with a margin of error of +/− $11,426) and the median family income was $137,821 (+/− $24,473). Males had a median income of $101,927 (+/− $22,844) versus $60,875 (+/− $7,233) for females. The per capita income for the borough was $47,777 (+/− $5,059). About 3.0% of families and 3.3% of the population were below the poverty line, including 2.9% of those under age 18 and 3.1% of those age 65 or over.

=== 2000 census ===
As of the 2000 United States census there were 4,698 people, 1,535 households, and 1,290 families residing in the township. The population density was 170.6 inhabitants per square mile (65.9/km^{2}). There were 1,598 housing units at an average density of 58.0 per square mile (22.4/km^{2}). The racial makeup of the township was 97.02% White, 0.79% African American, 0.11% Native American, 0.72% Asian, 0.04% Pacific Islander, 0.45% from other races, and 0.87% from two or more races. Hispanic or Latino of any race were 1.72% of the population.

There were 1,535 households, out of which 42.9% had children under the age of 18 living with them, 77.9% were married couples living together, 4.4% had a female householder with no husband present, and 15.9% were non-families. 13.5% of all households were made up of individuals, and 5.2% had someone living alone who was 65 years of age or older. The average household size was 2.95 and the average family size was 3.25.

In the township the population was spread out, with 28.1% under the age of 18, 4.9% from 18 to 24, 27.1% from 25 to 44, 27.8% from 45 to 64, and 12.1% who were 65 years of age or older. The median age was 40 years. For every 100 females, there were 100.3 males. For every 100 females age 18 and over, there were 95.0 males.

The median income for a household in the township was $92,730, and the median income for a family was $93,619. Males had a median income of $70,996 versus $39,904 for females. The per capita income for the township was $34,622. About 4.3% of families and 5.0% of the population were below the poverty line, including 7.7% of those under age 18 and 2.7% of those age 65 or over.

== Government ==
=== Local government ===
Alexandria Township is governed under the Township form of New Jersey municipal government, one of 141 municipalities (of the 564) statewide that use this form, the second-most commonly used form of government in the state. The governing body is comprised of a five-member Township Committee, whose members are elected directly by the voters at-large in partisan elections to serve three-year terms of office on a staggered basis, with one seat coming up for election each year as part of the November general election in a three-year cycle. At an annual reorganization meeting, the Township Committee selects one of its members to serve as mayor and another as deputy mayor.

In the November 2020 general election, voters approved a ballot question that asked if they wanted to expand the township committee from three members to five. In November 2021, voters chose two candidates to serve three-year terms and one to serve a two-year term, so that there were five members elected to the Township Committee starting in January 2022.

As of 2026, members of the Alexandria Township Committee are Mayor James Kiernan (R, term as mayor ends December 31, 2026; ), Deputy Mayor Tom Hudanish (R, 2028), Jay M. Arancio R, 2027), Robert Mortara (R, 2026) and Brad Patkochis (R, 2028).

=== Federal, state and county representation ===
Alexandria Township is located in the 7th Congressional district and is part of New Jersey's 23rd state legislative district.

For the 119th United States Congress, New Jersey's 7th congressional district is represented by Thomas Kean Jr. (R, Westfield). New Jersey is represented in the United States Senate by Democrats Cory Booker (Newark, term ends 2027) and Andy Kim (Moorestown, term ends 2031).

For the 2026–2027 session, the 23rd legislative district of the New Jersey Legislature is represented in the State Senate by Doug Steinhardt (R, Lopatcong Township) and in the General Assembly by John DiMaio (R, Hackettstown) and Erik Peterson (R, Franklin Township).

Hunterdon County is governed by a Board of County Commissioners comprised of five members who are elected at-large on a partisan basis to serve three-year terms of office on a staggered basis, with either one or two seats up for election each year as part of the November general election. At an annual reorganization meeting held each January, the commissioners select one member to serve as the board's Director and another to serve as Deputy Director, each for a one-year term. As of 2025, Hunterdon County's Commissioners are Director John E. Lanza (R; Raritan Township, 2025), Deputy Director Shaun C. Van Doren (R; Tewksbury Township, 2026), Jeff Kuhl (R; Raritan Township, 2027), Zachary T. Rich (R; West Amwell Township, 2025) and Susan Soloway (R; Franklin Township, 2027).

Constitutional officers elected on a countywide basis are Clerk Mary H. Melfi (R; Flemington, 2026), Sheriff Fredrick W. Brown (R; Alexandria Township, 2025) and Surrogate Heidi Rohrbach (R; Lebanon Township, 2028).

=== Politics ===
Like most municipalities in Hunterdon County, the township leans very strongly towards the Republican Party on the national and state levels. As of March 2011, there were a total of 3,411 registered voters in Alexandria Township, of which 533 (15.6%) were registered as Democrats, 1,458 (42.7%) were registered as Republicans and 1,417 (41.5%) were registered as Unaffiliated. There were 3 voters registered as Libertarians or Greens.

Gubernatorial election results for Alexandria Township
Year	Republican		Democratic		Third party(ies)	
Year	No.	%	No.	%	No.	%
2025	1,574	60.59%	1,008	38.80%	16	0.62%
2021	1,463	65.99%	728	32.84%	26	1.17%
2017	1,227	67.23%	566	31.01%	32	1.75%
2013	1,332	78.72%	332	19.62%	28	1.65%
2009	1,520	73.32%	388	18.72%	165	7.96%
2005	1,090	67.24%	431	26.59%	100	6.17%

In the 2012 presidential election, Republican Mitt Romney received 64.4% of the vote (1,695 cast), ahead of Democrat Barack Obama with 34.1% (899 votes), and other candidates with 1.5% (39 votes), among the 2,651 ballots cast by the township's 3,571 registered voters (18 ballots were spoiled), for a turnout of 74.2%. In the 2008 presidential election, Republican John McCain received 60.2% of the vote here (1,643 cast), ahead of Democrat Barack Obama with 37.4% (1,019 votes) and other candidates with 1.8% (48 votes), among the 2,728 ballots cast by the township's 3,378 registered voters, for a turnout of 80.8%. In the 2004 presidential election, Republican George W. Bush received 65.9% of the vote here (1,665 ballots cast), outpolling Democrat John Kerry with 36.2% (916 votes) and other candidates with 0.9% (28 votes), among the 2,528 ballots cast by the township's 3,030 registered voters, for a turnout percentage of 83.4.

United States presidential election results for Alexandria
Year	Republican		Democratic		Third party(ies)	
Year	No.	%	No.	%	No.	%
2024	1,941	60.13%	1,241	38.44%	46	1.43%
2020	1,972	58.45%	1,332	39.48%	70	2.07%
2016	1,788	63.86%	906	32.36%	106	3.79%
2012	1,695	64.38%	899	34.14%	39	1.48%
2008	1,643	60.63%	1,019	37.60%	48	1.77%
2004	1,665	63.82%	916	35.11%	28	1.07%

In the 2013 gubernatorial election, Republican Chris Christie received 78.7% of the vote (1,332 cast), ahead of Democrat Barbara Buono with 19.6% (332 votes), and other candidates with 1.7% (28 votes), among the 1,726 ballots cast by the township's 3,588 registered voters (34 ballots were spoiled), for a turnout of 48.1%. In the 2009 gubernatorial election, Republican Chris Christie received 72.3% of the vote here (1,520 ballots cast), ahead of Democrat Jon Corzine with 18.5% (388 votes), Independent Chris Daggett with 6.7% (140 votes) and other candidates with 1.2% (25 votes), among the 2,102 ballots cast by the township's 3,386 registered voters, yielding a 62.1% turnout.

United States Senate election results for Alexandria Township1
Year	Republican		Democratic		Third party(ies)	
Year	No.	%	No.	%	No.	%
2024	1,825	60.61%	1,120	37.20%	66	2.19%
2018	1,613	64.83%	790	31.75%	85	3.42%
2012	1,603	64.46%	808	32.49%	76	3.06%
2006	970	61.63%	528	33.55%	76	4.83%

United States Senate election results for Alexandria Township2
Year	Republican		Democratic		Third party(ies)	
Year	No.	%	No.	%	No.	%
2020	2,014	60.85%	1,221	36.89%	75	2.27%
2014	949	70.87%	359	26.81%	31	2.32%
2013	815	70.38%	328	28.32%	15	1.30%
2008	1,719	67.62%	747	29.39%	76	2.99%

== Education ==
The Alexandria Township School District serves students in pre-kindergarten through eighth grade. As of the 2023–24 school year, the district, comprised of one school, had an enrollment of 428 students and 47.0 classroom teachers (on an FTE basis), for a student–teacher ratio of 9.1:1.

Students in public school for ninth through twelfth grades attend Delaware Valley Regional High School, together with students from Frenchtown, Holland Township, Kingwood Township and Milford. The school is part of the Delaware Valley Regional High School District. As of the 2023–24 school year, the high school had an enrollment of 692 students and 61.5 classroom teachers (on an FTE basis), for a student–teacher ratio of 11.3:1. Seats on the high school district's nine-member board of education are allocated based on the population of the constituent municipalities, with two seats assigned to Alexandria Township.

The Alexandria Township Education Foundation, is a non-profit organization established in 1997, whose mission is to help achieve and maintain an extra margin of excellence by employing private resources to supplement traditional school district funding.

Eighth grade students from all of Hunterdon County are eligible to apply to attend the high school programs offered by the Hunterdon County Vocational School District, a county-wide vocational school district that offers career and technical education at its campuses in Raritan Township and at programs sited at local high schools, with no tuition charged to students for attendance.

== Transportation ==
Alexandria Field Airport is a privately owned public-use general aviation airport located in the geographic center of the township.

=== Roads and highways ===
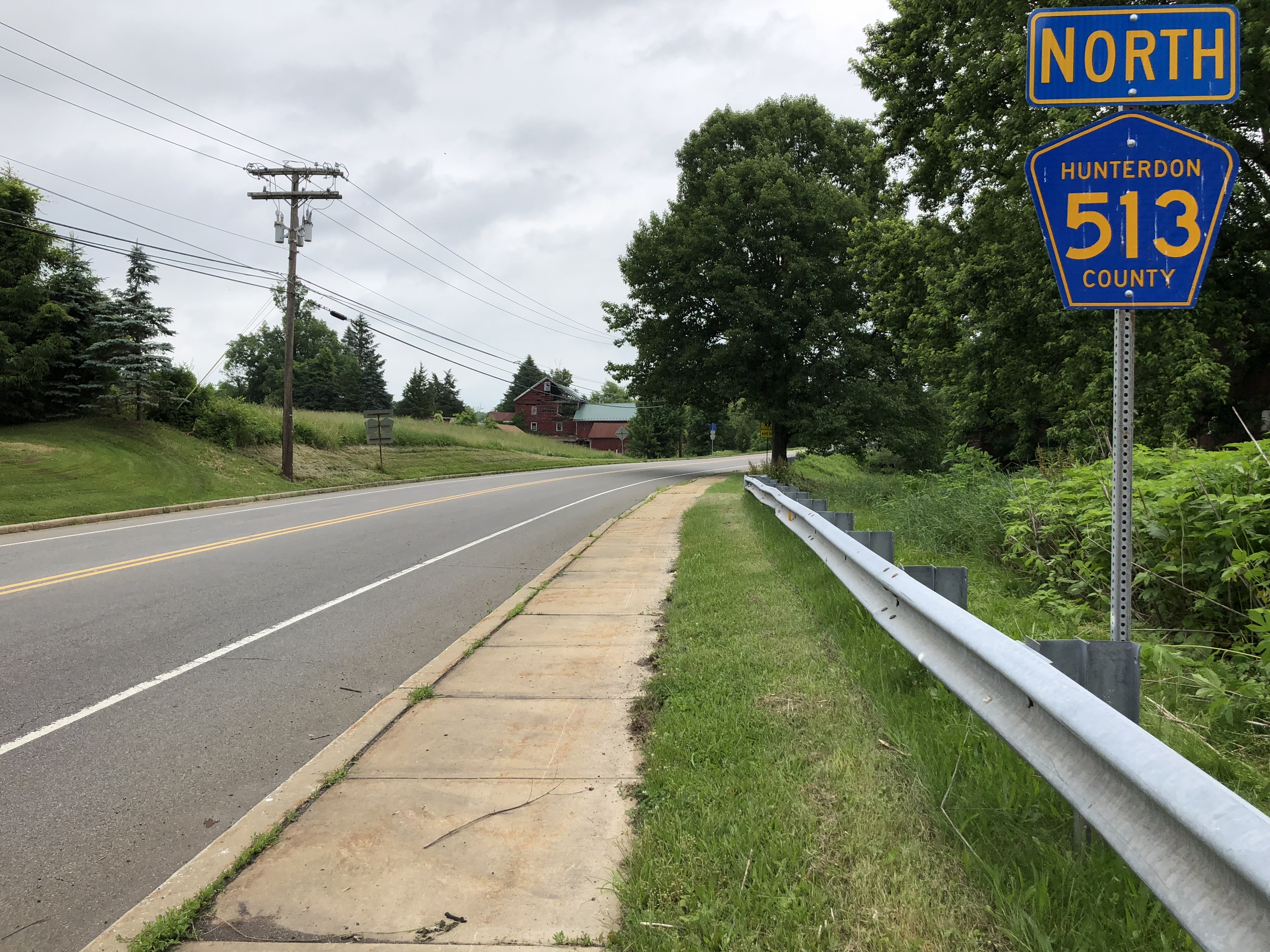
County Route 513 (Everittstown Road) in Alexandria Township

As of May 2010, the township had a total of 71.43 miles (114.96 km) of roadways, of which 48.77 miles (78.49 km) were maintained by the municipality and 22.66 miles (36.47 km) by Hunterdon County.

No Interstate, U.S. or State routes pass through the township. The most significant roads to pass through Alexandria are County Route 513 (Everittstown Road), CR 519 and CR 579 (which only runs along the northeast border).

Interstate 78 is the closest limited access road which is accessible outside the municipality in bordering Union and Franklin Townships.

== Wineries ==
- Beneduce Vineyards
- Mount Salem Vineyards

== Notable people ==
People who were born in, residents of, or otherwise closely associated with Alexandria Township include:

- Mary DeChambres, film and television editor
- Carla Katz (born 1959), union leader
- Frank Muehlheuser (1926–2006), American football fullback and linebacker who played in the NFL for the Boston Yanks and the New York Bulldogs
- Jayson Williams (born 1968), former NBA player with the New Jersey Nets and Philadelphia 76ers, who owned an estate that featured a private basketball court, a personalized movie theatre and many other features
