= Alexandria Airport (New Jersey) =

Airport in Alexandria Township, New Jersey, United States

- IATA: none; ICAO: none; FAA LID: N85

Summary
- Airport type: Public use
- Owner: Alexandria Airpark, LLC
- Operator: W. Fritsche - L. Castner
- Serves: Pittstown, New Jersey
- Location: Hunterdon County, New Jersey
- Elevation AMSL: 480 ft (150 m)
- Coordinates: 40°35′15″N 075°01′09″W
- Website: alexandriafield.com

Map
- Interactive map of Alexandria Airport

Runways
Direction	Length		Surface
Direction	ft	m	Surface
8/26	2,550	777	Asphalt
13/31	1,804	550	Asphalt/turf

Statistics (2010)
- Aircraft operations: 18,453
- Based aircraft: 76
- Source: Federal Aviation Administration

Alexandria Airport (FAA LID: N85) is a public-use airport located in Alexandria Township, New Jersey, two nautical miles (3.704 km) west of Pittstown, in Hunterdon County, New Jersey, United States. The airport is privately owned.

Alexandria Airport conducted an annual balloon festival from 1989 to 1998.
