= Hughesville, New Jersey =

Populated place in Hunterdon and Warren counties, New Jersey, US

- Unincorporated community
- Location within Hunterdon County, New Jersey Location within Warren County, New Jersey Location within New Jersey Location within the United States
- Coordinates: 40°37′19″N 75°09′21″W
- Country: United States
- State: New Jersey
- County: Hunterdon and Warren
- Township: Holland and Pohatcong
- Named for: Hugh Hughes
- Elevation: 190 ft (58 m)
- GNIS feature ID: 877282

Hughesville is an unincorporated community located along the border of Holland Township in Hunterdon County and Pohatcong Township in Warren County, in the U.S. state of New Jersey. The community is named after Hugh Hughes, a lawyer from Philadelphia, who built a forge here during the 18th century.

The Hughesville Dam on the Musconetcong River was removed in 2016 to allow American shad to spawn further upriver.
