= Frank Muehlheuser =

American football player (1926–2006)

No. 23
- Positions: Fullback, linebacker

Personal information
- Born: July 2, 1926; Irvington, New Jersey, U.S.
- Died: April 22, 2006 (aged 79); Pittstown, New Jersey, U.S.
- Listed height: 6 ft 2 in (1.88 m)
- Listed weight: 215 lb (98 kg)

Career information
- High school: Bloomfield (NJ)
- College: Colgate
- NFL draft: 1947: 8th round, 64th overall pick

Career history
- Boston Yanks/New York Bulldogs (1948–1949)

Career NFL statistics
- Rushing yards: 179
- Rushing average: 3.8
- Receptions: 5
- Receiving yards: 45
- Total touchdowns: 2
- Stats at Pro Football Reference

Frank Muehlheuser (July 2, 1926 – April 22, 2006) was an American professional football fullback and linebacker. He played for the Boston Yanks/New York Bulldogs from 1948 to 1949.

He died on April 22, 2006, at his home in Pittstown, New Jersey at age 79.
