= Milford, New Jersey =

Borough in Hunterdon County, New Jersey, US

- Borough
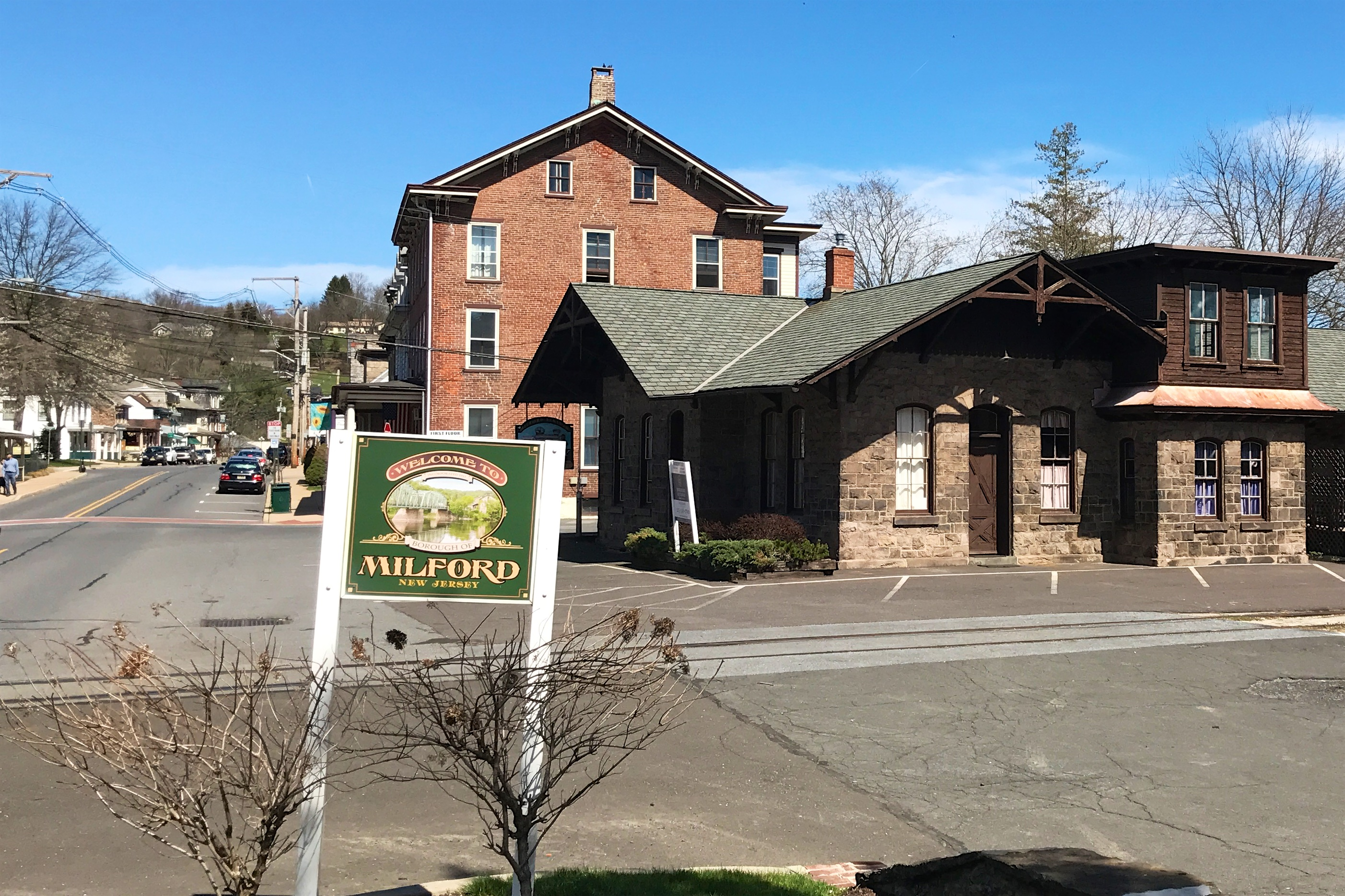
- Bridge Street, by Railroad Avenue

- Seal

- Location of Milford in Hunterdon County highlighted in red (left). Inset map: Location of Hunterdon County in New Jersey highlighted in orange (right).

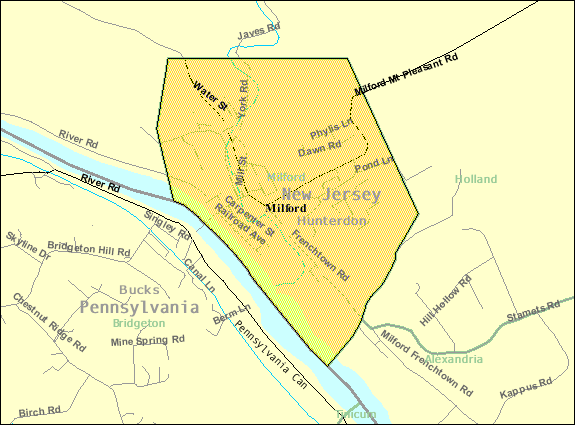
- Census Bureau map of Milford, New Jersey

- Location in Hunterdon County Location in New Jersey Location in the United States
- Coordinates: 40°34′07″N 75°05′40″W
- Country: United States
- State: New Jersey
- County: Hunterdon
- Incorporated: May 8, 1911

Government
  - Type: Borough
  - Body: Borough Council
  - Mayor: Henry R. Schepens (R, term ends December 31, 2023)
  - Municipal clerk: Karen Dysart

Area
  - Total: 1.27 sq mi (3.29 km^{2})
  - Land: 1.18 sq mi (3.06 km^{2})
  - Water: 0.089 sq mi (0.23 km^{2}) 6.93%
  - Rank: 476th of 565 in state 19th of 26 in county
- Elevation: 253 ft (77 m)

Population (2020)
  - Total: 1,232
  - Estimate (2023): 1,222
  - Rank: 525th of 565 in state 23rd of 26 in county
  - Density: 1,042/sq mi (402/km^{2})
  - Rank: 379th of 565 in state 9th of 26 in county
- Time zone: UTC−05:00 (Eastern (EST))
  - Summer (DST): UTC−04:00 (Eastern (EDT))
- ZIP Code: 08848
- Area code: 908
- FIPS code: 3401946260
- GNIS feature ID: 885301
- Website: www.milfordnj.gov

Milford is a borough located in western Hunterdon County, in the U.S. state of New Jersey. As of the 2020 United States census, the borough's population was 1,232, a decrease of one person (−0.1%) from the 2010 census count of 1,233, which in turn reflected an increase of 38 (+3.2%) from the 1,195 counted in the 2000 census.

Milford was incorporated as a borough by an act of the New Jersey Legislature on April 15, 1911, from portions of Holland Township, based on the results of a referendum held on May 8, 1911. The borough's incorporation was confirmed on March 13, 1925.

The borough is located on the Delaware River in the western portion of Hunterdon County, known as the Hunterdon Plateau. The borough dates to the mid-18th century when a grist mill was established beside a river in what was then Bethlehem Township. After the mill was destroyed by fire in 1769, the settlement became known as Burnt Mills in Alexandria Township. The area was renamed "Lowreytown" after Thomas Lowrey purchased land in the area in 1796. The community became commonly known as "Millford" or "Millsford" by the beginning of the 19th century, but by 1844 the name had lost a letter or two. By 1863 it was consistently spelled as "Milford". The community was incorporated in 1911 but the official incorporation was not registered until 1925.

The Milford Historic District, encompassing the community, was listed on the National Register of Historic Places in 2025.

== Geography ==
According to the United States Census Bureau, the borough had a total area of 1.27 square miles (3.29 km^{2}), including 1.18 square miles (3.06 km^{2}) of land and 0.09 square miles (0.23 km^{2}) of water (6.93%).

Milford borders the municipalities of Alexandria Township and Holland Township in Hunterdon County; and Bridgeton Township in Bucks County, across the Delaware River in the Commonwealth of Pennsylvania.

== Demographics ==
Historical population
Census	Pop.	Note	%±
1920	656		—
1930	933		42.2%
1940	933		0.0%
1950	1,012		8.5%
1960	1,114		10.1%
1970	1,230		10.4%
1980	1,368		11.2%
1990	1,273		−6.9%
2000	1,195		−6.1%
2010	1,233		3.2%
2020	1,232		−0.1%
2023 (est.)	1,222	▼	−0.8%
Population sources:1920 1920–1930 1940–2000; 2000 2010 2020

=== 2010 census ===
The 2010 United States census counted 1,233 people, 520 households, and 331 families in the borough. The population density was 1,073.4 inhabitants per square mile (414.4/km^{2}). There were 552 housing units at an average density of 480.5 per square mile (185.5/km^{2}). The racial makeup was 97.32% (1,200) White, 0.24% (3) Black or African American, 0.16% (2) Native American, 0.97% (12) Asian, 0.08% (1) Pacific Islander, 0.24% (3) from other races, and 0.97% (12) from two or more races. Hispanic or Latino of any race were 2.19% (27) of the population.

Of the 520 households, 26.7% had children under the age of 18; 51.7% were married couples living together; 7.9% had a female householder with no husband present and 36.3% were non-families. Of all households, 28.8% were made up of individuals and 12.3% had someone living alone who was 65 years of age or older. The average household size was 2.36 and the average family size was 2.93.

20.6% of the population were under the age of 18, 6.4% from 18 to 24, 24.2% from 25 to 44, 32.8% from 45 to 64, and 16.0% who were 65 years of age or older. The median age was 44.1 years. For every 100 females, the population had 95.7 males. For every 100 females ages 18 and older there were 97.0 males.

The Census Bureau's 2006–2010 American Community Survey showed that (in 2010 inflation-adjusted dollars) median household income was $75,948 (with a margin of error of +/− $6,902) and the median family income was $79,653 (+/− $5,673). Males had a median income of $52,679 (+/− $12,062) versus $42,778 (+/− $8,377) for females. The per capita income for the borough was $32,823 (+/− $2,774). About 0.9% of families and 2.6% of the population were below the poverty line, including none of those under age 18 and 6.6% of those age 65 or over.

=== 2000 census ===
At the 2000 United States census there were 1,195 people, 469 households and 323 families residing in the borough. The population density was 1,037.7 inhabitants per square mile (400.7/km^{2}). There were 484 housing units at an average density of 420.3 per square mile (162.3/km^{2}). The racial makeup of the borough was 97.57% White, 0.17% African American, 0.17% Native American, 0.42% Asian, 0.33% Pacific Islander, 0.08% from other races, and 1.26% from two or more races. Hispanic or Latino of any race were 2.01% of the population.

There were 469 households, of which 33.5% had children under the age of 18 living with them, 59.1% were married couples living together, 5.5% had a female householder with no husband present, and 31.1% were non-families. 27.1% of all households were made up of individuals, and 11.9% had someone living alone who was 65 years of age or older. The average household size was 2.55 and the average family size was 3.11.

25.4% of the population were under the age of 18, 4.6% from 18 to 24, 33.3% from 25 to 44, 23.1% from 45 to 64, and 13.6% who were 65 years of age or older. The median age was 39 years. For every 100 females, there were 102.9 males. For every 100 females age 18 and over, there were 97.3 males.

The median household income was $54,519 and the median family income was $62,167. Males had a median income of $46,500 and females $31,765. The per capita income was $25,039. About 1.8% of families and 3.7% of the population were below the poverty line, including 3.7% of those under age 18 and 6.4% of those age 65 or over.

== Government ==
=== Local government ===
Milford is governed under the borough form of New Jersey municipal government, one of 218 municipalities (of the 564) statewide that use this form, the most commonly used form of government in the state. The governing body is comprised of the mayor and the borough council, with all positions elected at-large on a partisan basis as part of the November general election. A mayor is elected directly by the voters to a four-year term of office. The borough council includes six members, who are elected to serve three-year terms on a staggered basis, with two seats coming up for election each year in a three-year cycle. The borough form of government used by Milford is a "weak mayor / strong council" government in which council members act as the legislative body with the mayor presiding at meetings and voting only in the event of a tie. The mayor can veto ordinances subject to an override by a two-thirds majority vote of the council. The mayor makes committee and liaison assignments for council members, and most appointments are made by the mayor with the advice and consent of the council.

As of 2023, the mayor of Milford Borough is Republican Henry Schepens, whose term of office ends December 31, 2023. Members of the Borough Council are Noralie LaFevre (R, 2025), James Gallos (R, 2024; appointed to serve an unexpired term), Ronald R. Rehl (R, 2025), Robert E. White (D, 2023) and Elisa Yager (R, 2024), with one seat vacant.

In February 2023, Russell Heller was shot and killed at a PSE&G facility by a former employee, leaving his seat expiring in December 2023 vacant.

In November 2018, Henry Schepens was elected to serve the balance of the term as mayor expiring in December 2019 that had been held by Ronald R. Rehl.

In January 2016, the Common Council selected Carole Heller to fill the seat expiring in December 2017 that became vacant after Ronald Rehl stepped down to be sworn in as mayor.

=== Federal, state and county representation ===
Milford is located in the 7th Congressional District and is part of New Jersey's 23rd state legislative district.

For the 119th United States Congress, New Jersey's 7th congressional district is represented by Thomas Kean Jr. (R, Westfield). New Jersey is represented in the United States Senate by Democrats Cory Booker (Newark, term ends 2027) and Andy Kim (Moorestown, term ends 2031).

For the 2026–2027 session, the 23rd legislative district of the New Jersey Legislature is represented in the State Senate by Doug Steinhardt (R, Lopatcong Township) and in the General Assembly by John DiMaio (R, Hackettstown) and Erik Peterson (R, Franklin Township).

Hunterdon County is governed by a Board of County Commissioners comprised of five members who are elected at-large on a partisan basis to serve three-year terms of office on a staggered basis, with either one or two seats up for election each year as part of the November general election. At an annual reorganization meeting held each January, the commissioners select one member to serve as the board's Director and another to serve as Deputy Director, each for a one-year term. As of 2025, Hunterdon County's Commissioners are Director John E. Lanza (R; Raritan Township, 2025), Deputy Director Shaun C. Van Doren (R; Tewksbury Township, 2026), Jeff Kuhl (R; Raritan Township, 2027), Zachary T. Rich (R; West Amwell Township, 2025) and Susan Soloway (R; Franklin Township, 2027).

Constitutional officers elected on a countywide basis are Clerk Mary H. Melfi (R; Flemington, 2026), Sheriff Fredrick W. Brown (R; Alexandria Township, 2025) and Surrogate Heidi Rohrbach (R; Lebanon Township, 2028).

=== Politics ===
In March 2011, there were 823 registered voters in Milford Township, of whom 206 (25.0%) were registered as Democrats, 304 (36.9%) as Republicans and 313 (38.0%) as unaffiliated. There were no voters registered to other parties.

Gubernatorial election results for Milford
Year	Republican		Democratic		Third party(ies)	
Year	No.	%	No.	%	No.	%
2025	293	48.83%	302	50.33%	5	0.83%
2021	262	54.24%	216	44.72%	5	1.04%
2017	192	48.85%	186	47.33%	15	3.82%
2013	274	67.82%	118	29.21%	12	2.97%
2009	281	59.03%	135	28.36%	60	12.61%
2005	225	54.22%	157	37.83%	33	7.95%

In the 2012 presidential election, Republican Mitt Romney received 49.7% of the vote (314 cast), ahead of Democrat Barack Obama with 47.0% (297 votes), and other candidates with 3.3% (21 votes), among the 635 ballots cast by the borough's 855 registered voters (3 ballots were spoiled), for a turnout of 74.3%. In the 2008 presidential election, Republican John McCain received 51.4% of the vote (340 cast), ahead of Democrat Barack Obama with 46.4% (307 votes) and other candidates with 2.1% (14 votes), among the 661 ballots cast by the township's 840 registered voters, for a turnout of 78.7%. In the 2004 presidential election, Republican George W. Bush received 57.9% of the vote (364 ballots cast), outpolling Democrat John Kerry with 40.7% (256 votes) and other candidates with 1.1% (9 votes), among the 629 ballots cast by the township's 787 registered voters, for a turnout percentage of 79.9.

United States presidential election results for Milford
Year	Republican		Democratic		Third party(ies)	
Year	No.	%	No.	%	No.	%
2024	378	52.57%	325	45.20%	16	2.23%
2020	369	50.83%	337	46.42%	20	2.75%
2016	350	53.60%	270	41.35%	33	5.05%
2012	314	49.68%	297	46.99%	21	3.32%
2008	340	51.44%	307	46.44%	14	2.12%
2004	364	57.87%	256	40.70%	9	1.43%

In the 2013 gubernatorial election, Republican Chris Christie received 67.8% of the vote (274 cast), ahead of Democrat Barbara Buono with 29.2% (118 votes), and other candidates with 3.0% (12 votes), among the 407 ballots cast by the borough's 851 registered voters (3 ballots were spoiled), for a turnout of 47.8%. In the 2009 gubernatorial election, Republican Chris Christie received 58.4% of the vote (281 ballots cast), ahead of Democrat Jon Corzine with 28.1% (135 votes), Independent Chris Daggett with 10.6% (51 votes) and other candidates with 1.9% (9 votes), among the 481 ballots cast by the township's 827 registered voters, yielding a 58.2% turnout.

United States Senate election results for Milford1
Year	Republican		Democratic		Third party(ies)	
Year	No.	%	No.	%	No.	%
2024	341	50.67%	303	45.02%	29	4.31%
2018	303	52.88%	236	41.19%	34	5.93%
2012	287	48.81%	270	45.92%	31	5.27%
2006	228	57.14%	151	37.84%	20	5.01%

United States Senate election results for Milford2
Year	Republican		Democratic		Third party(ies)	
Year	No.	%	No.	%	No.	%
2020	353	49.72%	320	45.07%	37	5.21%
2014	176	49.86%	163	46.18%	14	3.97%
2013	135	56.25%	102	42.50%	3	1.25%
2008	344	56.86%	227	37.52%	34	5.62%

== Education ==
The Milford Borough School District serves public school students in pre-kindergarten through eighth grade at Milford Public School. As of the 2023–24 school year, the district, comprised of one school, had an enrollment of 70 students and 9.1 classroom teachers (on an FTE basis), for a student–teacher ratio of 7.7:1. In the 2016–17 school year, the Milford district had the 5th-smallest enrollment of any school district in the state, with 81 students.

Students in public school for ninth through twelfth grades attend Delaware Valley Regional High School, together with students from Alexandria Township, Frenchtown, Holland Township and Kingwood Township. As of the 2023–24 school year, the high school had an enrollment of 692 students and 61.5 classroom teachers (on an FTE basis), for a student–teacher ratio of 11.3:1. The nine seats on the high school district's board of education are allocated based on the population of the constituent municipalities, with one seat assigned to Milford.

Eighth grade students from all of Hunterdon County are eligible to apply to attend the high school programs offered by the Hunterdon County Vocational School District, a county-wide vocational school district that offers career and technical education at its campuses in Raritan Township and at programs sited at local high schools, with no tuition charged to students for attendance.

== Transportation ==
=== Roads and highways ===
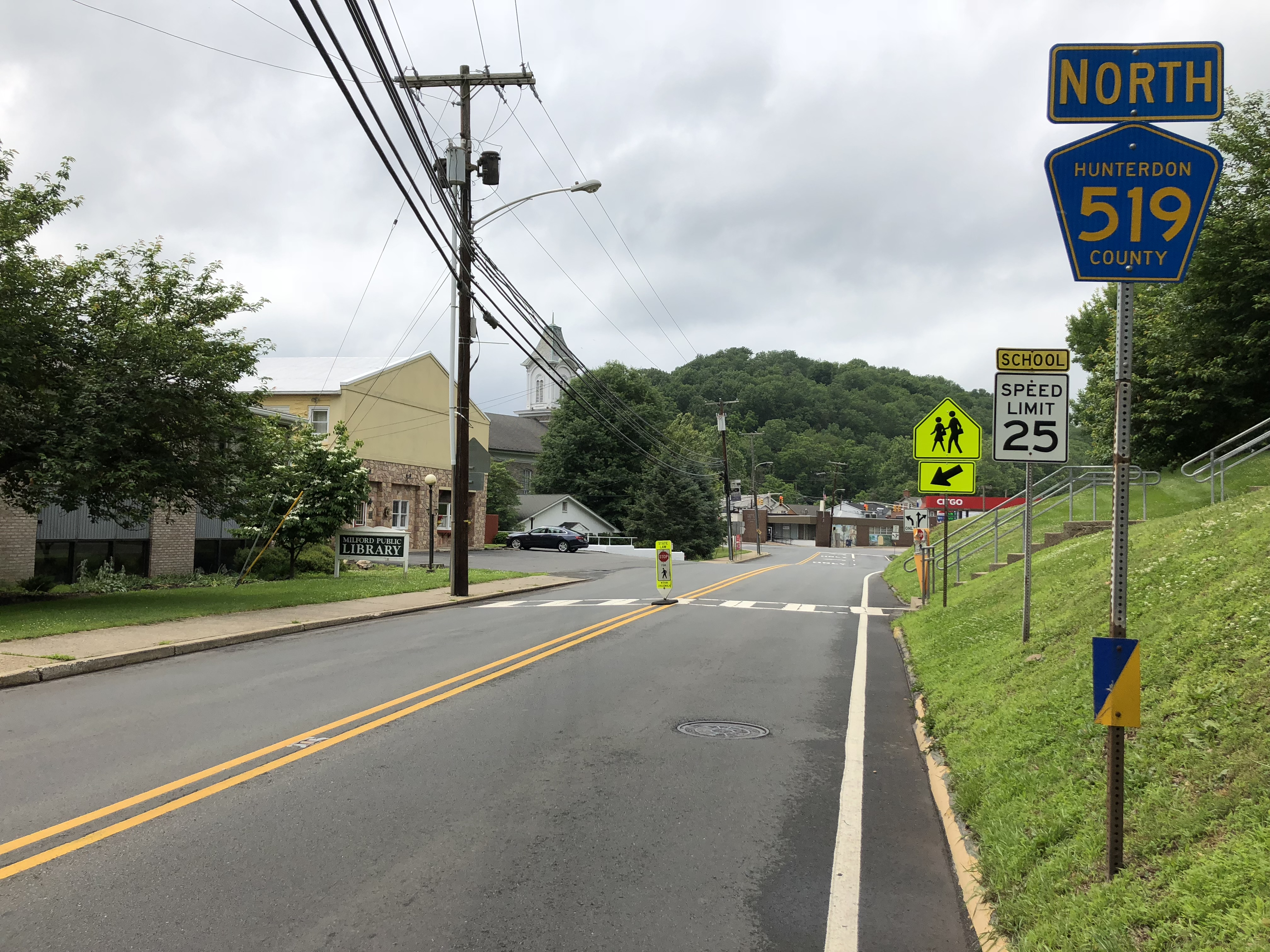
County Route 519 in Milford

In May 2010, the borough had 10.34 mi (16.64 km) of roadways, of which 7.86 mi (12.65 km) were maintained by the municipality and 2.48 mi (3.99 km) by Hunterdon County.

County Route 519 (CR 519) is the only major roadway passing through Milford.

The Upper Black Eddy – Milford Bridge, owned and operated by the Delaware River Joint Toll Bridge Commission, carries Bridge Street across the Delaware River, connecting CR 519 in Milford with Pennsylvania Route 32 in Upper Black Eddy, Pennsylvania. The existing bridge was constructed in 1933 on the site of a covered bridge built in 1842 and another partially destroyed in a 1903 flood. The bridge is a Warren truss that extends 700 ft (210 m) across the river.

=== Public transportation ===
The Hunterdon County LINK provide bus service on Routes 17 / 18, which operate between Milford and Clinton.

== Notable people ==
People who were born in, residents of, or otherwise closely associated with Milford include:

- Louis Adamic (1899–1951), Slovene-American author and translator
- Carlton Cooley (1898–1981), violist and composer
- Elias Deemer (1838–1918) member of the United States House of Representatives from Pennsylvania from 1901 to 1907
- Richard Egielski (born 1952), illustrator who was awarded the 1987 Caldecott Medal for his work in the book Hey, Al, written by Arthur Yorinks
- Wanda Gág (1893–1946), artist and author of children's books (Millions of Cats)
- Thomas Lowrey (1737–1809), settled in Milford in the 1790s and built the first hotel and grist mill on Bridge Street. He named the town Lowreytown, but it was renamed Millsford following his death in 1809
- George C. Ludlow (1830–1900), 25th Governor of New Jersey
- Abigail Roberts (minister) (1791–1841), pioneer in religion and women's rights who was one of the first American women to serve as a minister and established the United Church in Milford

== See also ==
- Hunterdon Plateau
