= Cherryville =

Cherryville may refer to one of the following places:

- Cherryville, British Columbia
- Cherryville, Missouri
- Cherryville, New Jersey
- Cherryville, North Carolina
- Cherryville, Oregon
- Cherryville, Pennsylvania
- Cherryville, South Australia
