= Franklin Township, Hunterdon County, New Jersey =

Township in Hunterdon County, New Jersey, US

Franklin Township, New Jersey
- Township
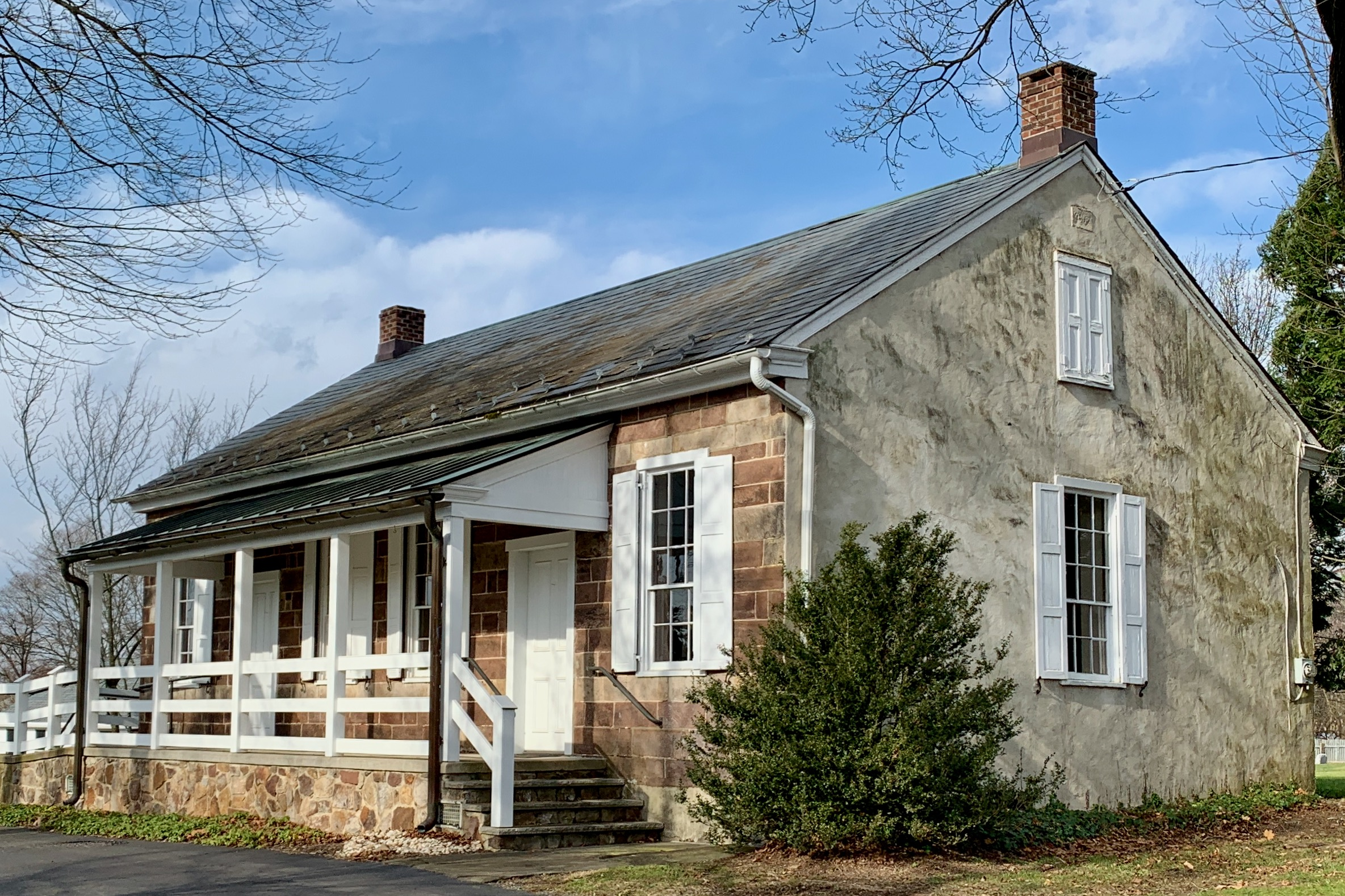
- Quaker Meeting House in the Quakertown section of the township

- Seal

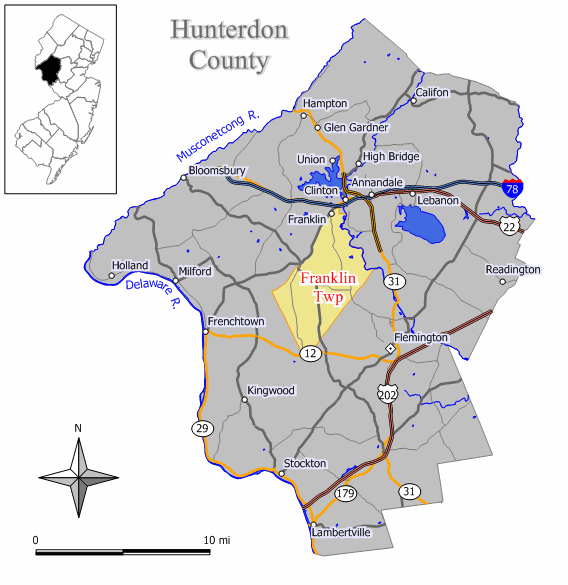
- Location of Franklin Township in Hunterdon County highlighted in yellow (right). Inset map: Location of Hunterdon County in New Jersey highlighted in black (left).

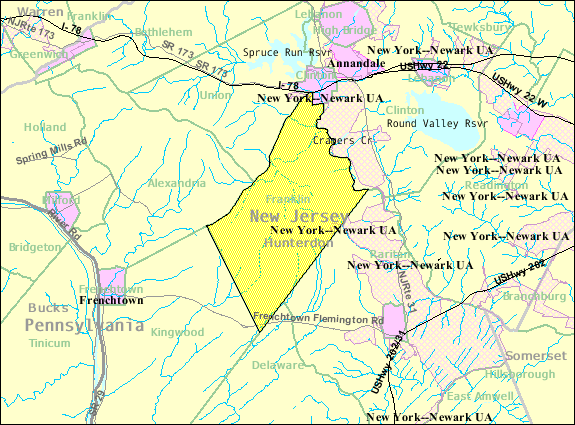
- Census Bureau map of Franklin Township, Hunterdon County, New Jersey

- Location in Hunterdon County Location in New Jersey Location in the United States
- Coordinates: 40.569033°N 74.931227°W
- Country: United States
- State: New Jersey
- County: Hunterdon
- Incorporated: April 7, 1845
- Named for: Benjamin Franklin

Government
  - Type: Township
  - Body: Township Committee
  - Mayor: Philip Koury (R, term ends December 31, 2023)
  - Municipal clerk: Christine Burke

Area
  - Total: 23.17 sq mi (60.02 km^{2})
  - Land: 23.03 sq mi (59.66 km^{2})
  - Water: 0.14 sq mi (0.36 km^{2}) 0.60%
  - Rank: 120th of 565 in state 11th of 26 in county
- Elevation: 600 ft (180 m)

Population (2020)
  - Total: 3,267
  - Estimate (2023): 3,286
  - Rank: 436th of 565 in state 16th of 26 in county
  - Density: 141.8/sq mi (54.7/km^{2})
  - Rank: 524th of 565 in state 22nd of 26 in county
- Time zone: UTC−05:00 (Eastern (EST))
  - Summer (DST): UTC−04:00 (Eastern (EDT))
- ZIP Code: 08867 – Pittstown
- Area code: 908
- FIPS code: 3401924870
- GNIS feature ID: 0882184
- Website: www.franklin-twp.org

Franklin Township is a township in central Hunterdon County, in the U.S. state of New Jersey. As of the 2020 United States census, the township's population was 3,267, an increase of 72 (+2.3%) from the 2010 census count of 3,195, which in turn reflected an increase of 205 (+6.9%) from the 2,990 counted in the 2000 census. Most of the township lies on the Hunterdon Plateau with only the eastern section along the South Branch Raritan River being on the lower part of the Newark Basin.

== History ==
Long populated by the Lenape (Delaware) Native Americans, the first European settlement of present-day Franklin was around 1700, when it became a Quaker community of settlers who came from Burlington County. The most reliable records that are available about the early days of the Township are found in the minutes of the Friends' Meeting in Quakertown.

Franklin Township was established by an act of the New Jersey Legislature on April 7, 1845, when it was created from portions of Kingwood Township, based on the results of a referendum held that day. Portions of the township were taken to form Clinton town on April 5, 1865. The township was named for Benjamin Franklin.

The rich soil made the township a center of agriculture for hundreds of years. While Franklin Township had long hosted a major dairy farming industry, in modern times, the primary crops have been corn, hay and soybeans.

== Geography ==
According to the United States Census Bureau, the township had a total area of 23.18 square miles (60.02 km^{2}), including 23.04 square miles (59.66 km^{2}) of land and 0.14 square miles (0.36 km^{2}) of water (0.60%).

Unincorporated communities, localities and place names located partially or completely within the township include Allens Corner, Alvater Corner, Cherryville (previously known as Dogtown), Grandin, Kingtown, Lansdowne, Littletown, Oak Grove, Pittstown, Quakertown (previously known as Fairview), Sidney and Sunnyside. Pittstown, previously known as Hoffs, is also spread across Alexandria Township and Union Township.

The Capoolong Creek, which runs through Pittstown, was an attraction to early settlers and they soon established three of the oldest churches in present-day Hunterdon: Thomas Episcopal, established in 1723, Bethlehem Presbyterian, organized in 1730 and the Quaker Church in 1733.

The township borders the Hunterdon County municipalities of Alexandria Township, Clinton, Clinton Township, Delaware Township, Kingwood Township, Raritan Township and Union Township.

== Demographics ==
Historical population
Census	Pop.	Note	%±
1850	1,454		—
1860	1,552		6.7%
1870	1,342	*	−13.5%
1880	1,338		−0.3%
1890	1,287		−3.8%
1900	1,258		−2.3%
1910	1,099		−12.6%
1920	980		−10.8%
1930	1,100		12.2%
1940	1,211		10.1%
1950	1,255		3.6%
1960	1,777		41.6%
1970	2,154		21.2%
1980	2,294		6.5%
1990	2,851		24.3%
2000	2,990		4.9%
2010	3,195		6.9%
2020	3,267		2.3%
2023 (est.)	3,286		0.6%
Population sources: 1850–1920; 1850–1870 1850 1870; 1880–1890 1890–1910; 1910–1930 1940–2000; 2000 2010 2020 * = Lost territory in previous decade.

=== 2010 census ===
The 2010 United States census counted 3,195 people, 1,137 households, and 908 families in the township. The population density was 140.1 per square mile (54.1/km^{2}). There were 1,204 housing units at an average density of 52.8 per square mile (20.4/km^{2}). The racial makeup was 96.84% (3,094) White, 0.69% (22) Black or African American, 0.16% (5) Native American, 1.25% (40) Asian, 0.09% (3) Pacific Islander, 0.44% (14) from other races, and 0.53% (17) from two or more races. Hispanic or Latino of any race were 3.44% (110) of the population.

Of the 1,137 households, 34.6% had children under the age of 18; 71.0% were married couples living together; 5.3% had a female householder with no husband present and 20.1% were non-families. Of all households, 15.1% were made up of individuals and 6.9% had someone living alone who was 65 years of age or older. The average household size was 2.80 and the average family size was 3.13.

24.7% of the population were under the age of 18, 5.9% from 18 to 24, 19.4% from 25 to 44, 34.6% from 45 to 64, and 15.3% who were 65 years of age or older. The median age was 45.0 years. For every 100 females, the population had 98.1 males. For every 100 females ages 18 and older there were 98.9 males.

The Census Bureau's 2006–2010 American Community Survey showed that (in 2010 inflation-adjusted dollars) median household income was $104,500 (with a margin of error of +/− $19,534) and the median family income was $118,182 (+/− $16,643). Males had a median income of $72,303 (+/− $13,313) versus $52,202 (+/− $5,525) for females. The per capita income for the borough was $46,892 (+/− $5,196). About 1.7% of families and 1.1% of the population were below the poverty line, including 1.0% of those under age 18 and none of those age 65 or over.

=== 2000 census ===
As of the 2000 United States census there were 2,990 people, 1,091 households, and 890 families residing in the township. The population density was 130.7 inhabitants per square mile (50.5/km^{2}). There were 1,125 housing units at an average density of 49.2 per square mile (19.0/km^{2}). The racial makeup of the township was 97.53% White, 0.40% African American, 0.23% Native American, 0.77% Asian, 0.33% from other races, and 0.74% from two or more races. Hispanic or Latino of any race were 2.24% of the population.

There were 1,091 households, out of which 34.6% had children under the age of 18 living with them, 73.8% were married couples living together, 5.7% had a female householder with no husband present, and 18.4% were non-families. 14.2% of all households were made up of individuals, and 6.0% had someone living alone who was 65 years of age or older. The average household size was 2.74 and the average family size was 3.04.

In the township the population was spread out, with 24.9% under the age of 18, 4.4% from 18 to 24, 28.0% from 25 to 44, 30.6% from 45 to 64, and 12.1% who were 65 years of age or older. The median age was 42 years. For every 100 females, there were 98.3 males. For every 100 females age 18 and over, there were 99.1 males.

The median income for a household in the township was $91,364, and the median income for a family was $96,320. Males had a median income of $66,667 versus $44,779 for females. The per capita income for the township was $39,668. About 1.5% of families and 1.6% of the population were below the poverty line, including 1.5% of those under age 18 and 4.9% of those age 65 or over.

== Government ==
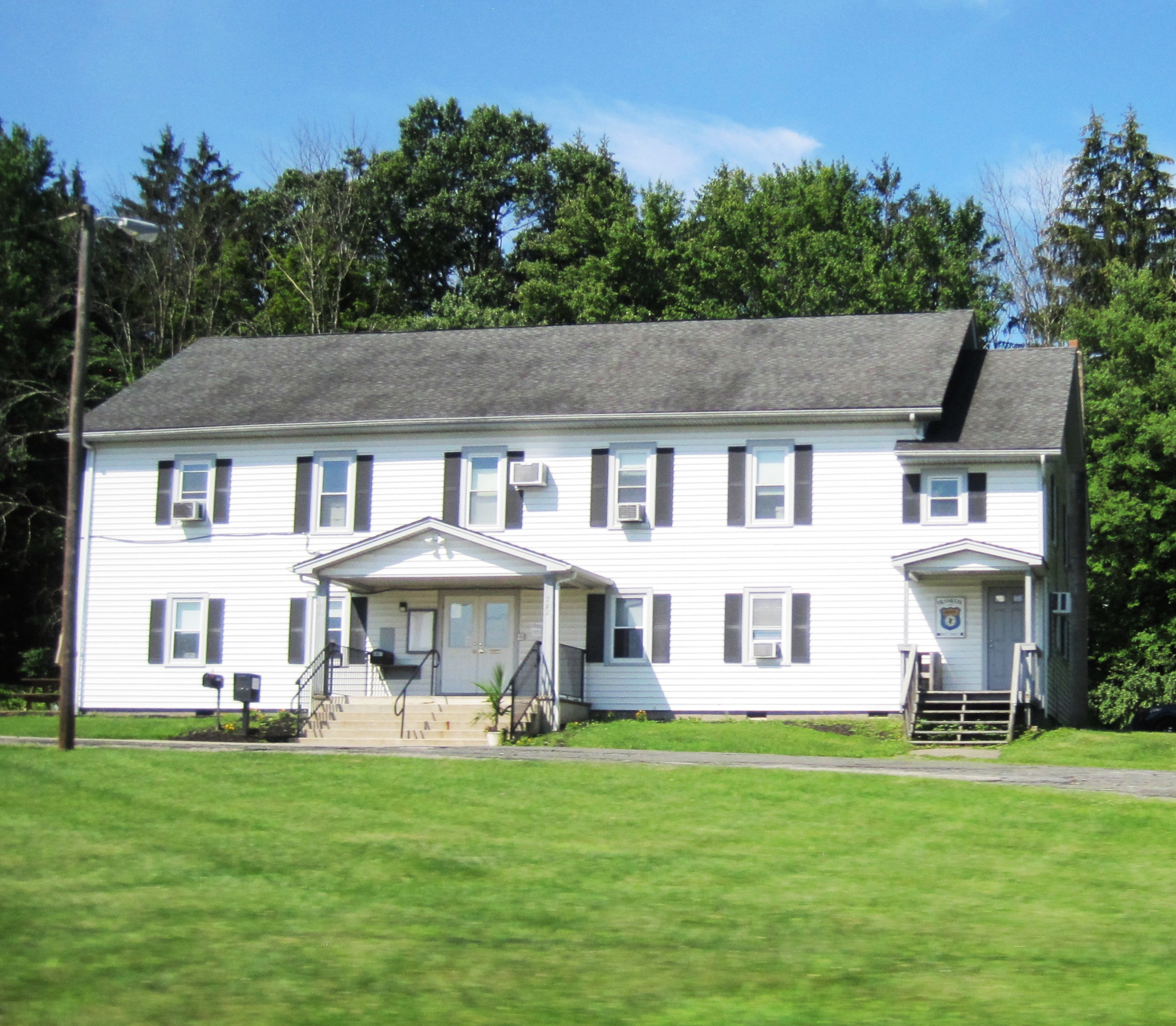
Franklin Township Municipal Building

=== Local government ===
Franklin Township is governed under the Township form of government, which is used by 141 of the state's 564 municipalities. The Township Committee is comprised of five members, who are elected directly by the voters at-large in partisan elections to serve three-year terms of office on a staggered basis, with either one or two seats coming up for election each year as part of the November general election in a three-year cycle. At an annual reorganization meeting, the Township Committee selects one of its members to serve as Mayor and another as Deputy Mayor.

As of 2023, members of the Franklin Township Committee are Mayor Philip J. Koury (R, term on committee and as mayor ends December 31, 2023), Deputy Mayor Michael Homulak (R, term on committee ends 2024; term as deputy mayor ends 2023), Sebastian Donaruma (R, 2025), Craig A. Repmann (R, 2024) and Deanna Seiple (R, 2025).

In January 2019, the Township Committee selected Sebastian Donaruma from a list of three candidates nominated by the Republic municipal committee to fill the seat expiring in December 2019 that was vacated in December 2018 by Susan Soloway before she was sworn into the Hunterdon County Board of Chosen Freeholders.

=== Federal, state and county representation ===
Franklin Township is located in the 7th Congressional District and is part of New Jersey's 23rd state legislative district. Prior to the 2010 Census, Franklin Township had been part of the 12th Congressional District, a change made by the New Jersey Redistricting Commission that took effect in January 2013, based on the results of the November 2012 general elections.

For the 119th United States Congress, New Jersey's 7th congressional district is represented by Thomas Kean Jr. (R, Westfield). New Jersey is represented in the United States Senate by Democrats Cory Booker (Newark, term ends 2027) and Andy Kim (Moorestown, term ends 2031).

For the 2026–2027 session, the 23rd legislative district of the New Jersey Legislature is represented in the State Senate by Doug Steinhardt (R, Lopatcong Township) and in the General Assembly by John DiMaio (R, Hackettstown) and Erik Peterson (R, Franklin Township).

Hunterdon County is governed by a Board of County Commissioners comprised of five members who are elected at-large on a partisan basis to serve three-year terms of office on a staggered basis, with either one or two seats up for election each year as part of the November general election. At an annual reorganization meeting held each January, the commissioners select one member to serve as the board's Director and another to serve as Deputy Director, each for a one-year term. As of 2025, Hunterdon County's Commissioners are Director John E. Lanza (R; Raritan Township, 2025), Deputy Director Shaun C. Van Doren (R; Tewksbury Township, 2026), Jeff Kuhl (R; Raritan Township, 2027), Zachary T. Rich (R; West Amwell Township, 2025) and Susan Soloway (R; Franklin Township, 2027).

Constitutional officers elected on a countywide basis are Clerk Mary H. Melfi (R; Flemington, 2026), Sheriff Fredrick W. Brown (R; Alexandria Township, 2025) and Surrogate Heidi Rohrbach (R; Lebanon Township, 2028).

=== Politics ===
As of March 2011, there were a total of 2,253 registered voters in Franklin Township, of which 382 (17.0%) were registered as Democrats, 1,021 (45.3%) were registered as Republicans and 850 (37.7%) were registered as Unaffiliated. There were no voters registered to other parties.

Gubernatorial election results for Franklin Township
Year	Republican		Democratic		Third party(ies)	
Year	No.	%	No.	%	No.	%
2025	1,039	60.69%	660	38.55%	13	0.76%
2021	1,048	68.45%	476	31.09%	7	0.46%
2017	803	66.53%	378	31.32%	26	2.15%
2013	861	77.78%	225	20.33%	21	1.90%
2009	977	69.99%	303	21.70%	116	8.31%
2005	838	67.20%	365	29.27%	44	3.53%

In the 2012 presidential election, Republican Mitt Romney received 65.8% of the vote (1,166 cast), ahead of Democrat Barack Obama with 33.2% (588 votes), and other candidates with 1.0% (18 votes), among the 1,781 ballots cast by the township's 2,362 registered voters (9 ballots were spoiled), for a turnout of 75.4%. In the 2008 presidential election, Republican John McCain received 61.0% of the vote (1,118 cast), ahead of Democrat Barack Obama with 36.6% (670 votes) and other candidates with 1.7% (31 votes), among the 1,833 ballots cast by the township's 2,228 registered voters, for a turnout of 82.3%. In the 2004 presidential election, Republican George W. Bush received 63.3% of the vote (1,130 ballots cast), outpolling Democrat John Kerry with 35.3% (630 votes) and other candidates with 1.1% (24 votes), among the 1,784 ballots cast by the township's 2,133 registered voters, for a turnout percentage of 83.6.

United States presidential election results for Franklin Township
Year	Republican		Democratic		Third party(ies)	
Year	No.	%	No.	%	No.	%
2024	1,306	60.60%	807	37.45%	42	1.95%
2020	1,300	59.55%	840	38.48%	43	1.97%
2016	1,135	61.92%	620	33.82%	78	4.26%
2012	1,166	65.80%	588	33.18%	18	1.02%
2008	1,118	61.46%	670	36.83%	31	1.70%
2004	1,130	63.34%	630	35.31%	24	1.35%

In the 2013 gubernatorial election, Republican Chris Christie received 77.8% of the vote (861 cast), ahead of Democrat Barbara Buono with 20.3% (225 votes), and other candidates with 1.9% (21 votes), among the 1,132 ballots cast by the township's 2,279 registered voters (25 ballots were spoiled), for a turnout of 49.7%. In the 2009 gubernatorial election, Republican Chris Christie received 69.5% of the vote (977 ballots cast), ahead of Democrat Jon Corzine with 21.6% (303 votes), Independent Chris Daggett with 8.0% (112 votes) and other candidates with 0.3% (4 votes), among the 1,406 ballots cast by the township's 2,215 registered voters, yielding a 63.5% turnout.

United States Senate election results for Franklin Township1
Year	Republican		Democratic		Third party(ies)	
Year	No.	%	No.	%	No.	%
2024	1,246	61.20%	743	36.49%	47	2.31%
2018	1,071	65.34%	519	31.67%	49	2.99%
2012	1,066	64.41%	541	32.69%	48	2.90%
2006	703	61.40%	399	34.85%	43	3.76%

United States Senate election results for Franklin Township2
Year	Republican		Democratic		Third party(ies)	
Year	No.	%	No.	%	No.	%
2020	1,320	61.60%	779	36.35%	44	2.05%
2014	640	67.16%	291	30.54%	22	2.31%
2013	538	69.42%	230	29.68%	7	0.90%
2008	1,132	66.71%	523	30.82%	42	2.47%

== Education ==
The Franklin Township School District serves public school students in pre-kindergarten through eighth grade at Franklin Township School. As of the 2023–24 school year, the district, comprised of one school, had an enrollment of 272 students and 32.2 classroom teachers (on an FTE basis), for a student–teacher ratio of 8.5:1.

Public school students in ninth through twelfth grades attend North Hunterdon High School in Annandale together with students from Bethlehem Township, Clinton Town, Clinton Township, Lebanon Borough and Union Township. As of the 2023–24 school year, the high school had an enrollment of 1,262 students and 115.5 classroom teachers (on an FTE basis), for a student–teacher ratio of 10.9:1. The school is part of the North Hunterdon-Voorhees Regional High School District, which also includes students from Califon, Glen Gardner, Hampton, High Bridge, Lebanon Township and Tewksbury Township, who attend Voorhees High School in Lebanon Township.

== Transportation ==
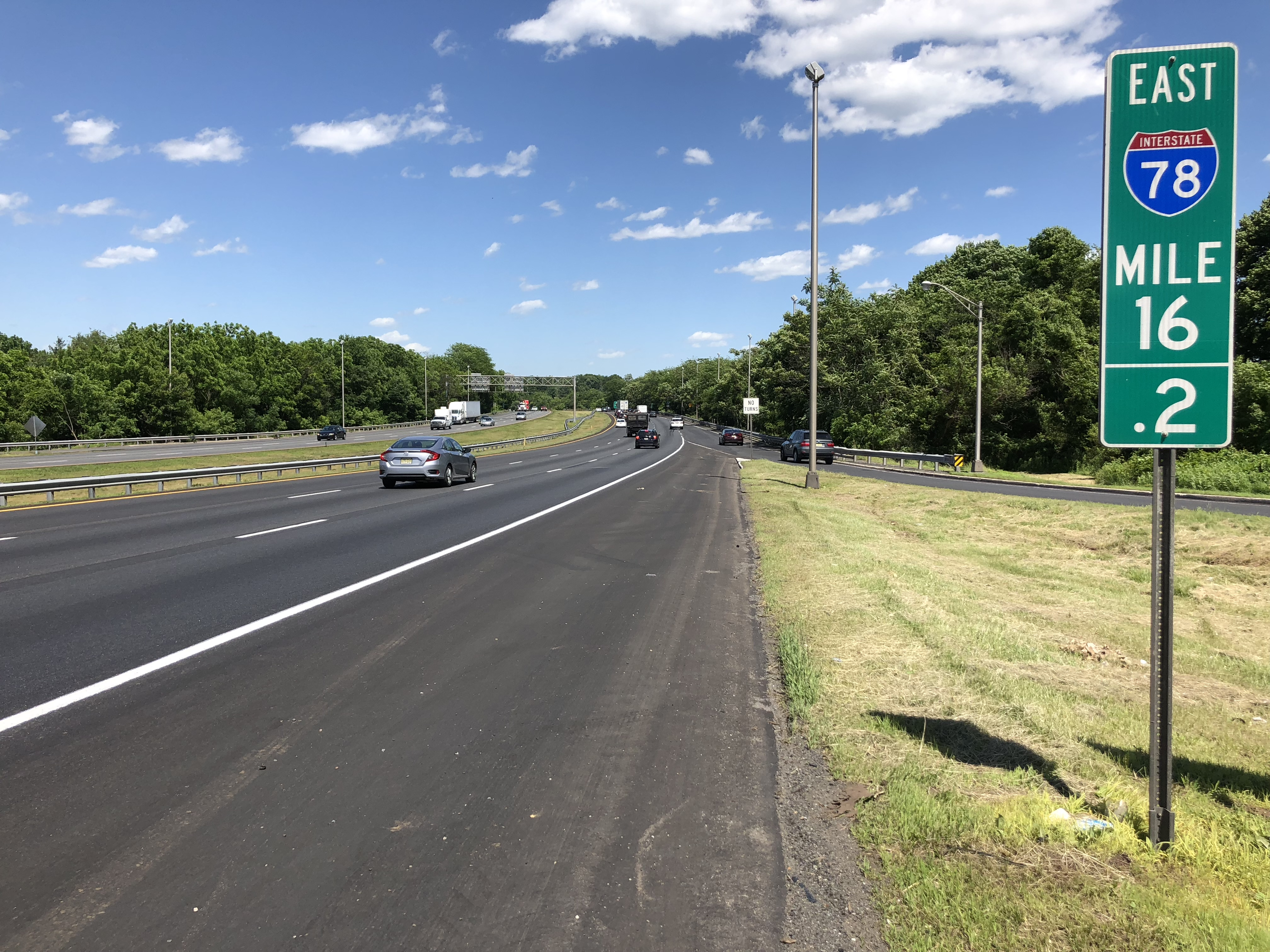
Interstate 78 / U.S. Route 22 eastbound in Franklin Township

As of May 2010, the township had a total of 53.09 miles (85.44 km) of roadways, of which 32.91 miles (52.96 km) were maintained by the municipality, 19.55 miles (31.46 km) by Hunterdon County and 0.63 miles (1.01 km) by the New Jersey Department of Transportation.

There are several major roads in Franklin Township. The most significant is Interstate 78 / U.S. Route 22, which traverses through for a fifth of a mile with an interchange (Exit 15) at the northern tip of the township (which is the eastern overlapping end of Route 173). Route 12 also passes through for just less than 0.5 miles (0.80 km).

County roads that pass through include CR 513 and CR 579.

The Norfolk Southern Railway's Lehigh Line (formerly the mainline of the Lehigh Valley Railroad), runs through the northern part of Franklin Township.

== Points of interest ==
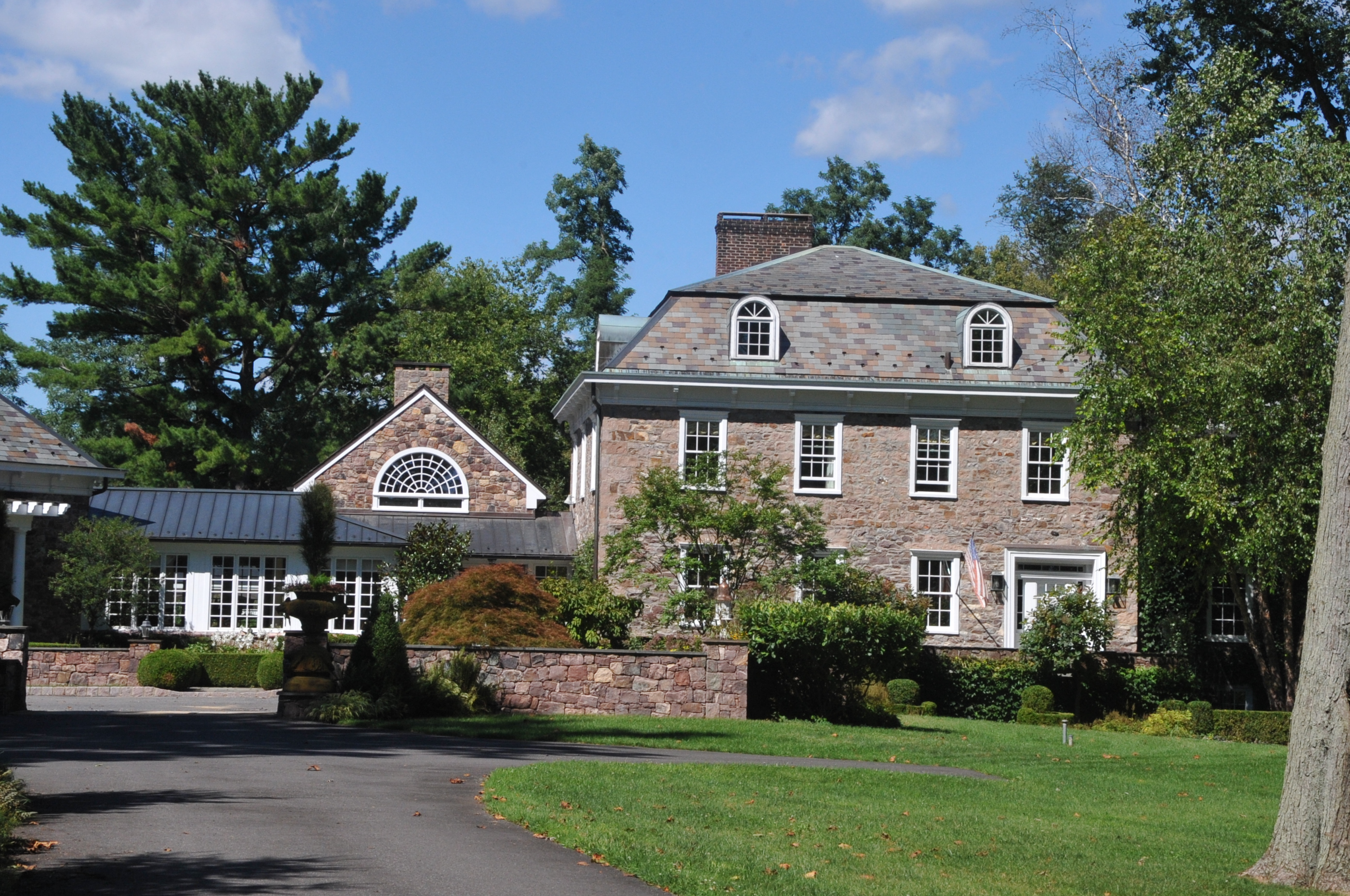
Lansdown

- Lansdown, a historic house in Lansdowne, was owned by Commissary-General Charles Stewart during the American Revolution. It was listed on the National Register of Historic Places in 1979.
- Quaker Meeting House, a Quaker meeting house in Quakertown, was listed on the NRHP in 1990

== Notable people ==
People who were born in, residents of, or otherwise closely associated with Franklin Township include:

- Christian Bauman (born 1970), novelist, essayist, and lyricist
- Hiram Deats (1810–1887), businessman, agricultural manufacturing
- Chris Kappler (born 1967), Olympic gold and silver medalist in equestrian events
- John J. Myers (born 1941), prelate of the Catholic Church and former Archbishop emeritus of Newark, New Jersey
- Erik Peterson (born 1966), politician who serves in the New Jersey General Assembly representing the 23rd Legislative District
- Toshiko Takaezu (1922–2011), ceramic artist and painter
