= Hiram Edmund Deats =

American philatelist, historian and publisher

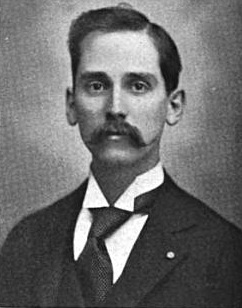
- Born: May 20, 1870
- Died: March 16, 1963 (aged 92)
- Engineering career
- Institutions: American Philatelic Society
- Projects: Formed a famous collection of revenue stamps and philatelic library
- Awards: APS Hall of Fame

Hiram Edmund Deats (May 20, 1870 – March 16, 1963) was an American philatelist, historian and publisher from Flemington, Hunterdon County, New Jersey. He was especially acclaimed for his collection of revenue stamps.

== Life and family ==
Hiram Edmund Deats was born on May 20, 1870, in the Brookville section of Stockton to Hiram Deats (1810–1887) and Elmira Stevenson (1830–1908).

In 1929, he donated several pieces of agricultural equipment made by the Deats company, started by his father, to Rutgers University under the care of Professor Wabun C. Krueger. This collection, including the Deats plow, patented by his grandfather, John Deats, became important in the creation of the New Jersey Museum of Agriculture in 1990.

He died on March 16, 1963.

== Collecting interests ==
As a youth, Deats started collecting postage stamps of the United States and the Confederate States of America and eventually created one of the finest collections of his era, eventually selling the collection.

Deats specialized in the collecting of United States revenue stamps, and his collection, which in 1888 included the revenue collection of Edward Boker Sterling, was unsurpassed. George L. Toppan and Alexander Holland used this collection as a basis for writing, in 1899, An Historical Reference List of the Revenue Stamps of the United States Including the Private Die Proprietary Stamps, which was re-printed in 1979 as The Boston Revenue Book.

Deats also formed one of the finest libraries of philatelic books and literature in the United States, which, in 1952, he donated to the Free Library of Philadelphia.

== Philatelic activity ==
At the age of 16, Deats joined the American Philatelic Association (later renamed the American Philatelic Society) and served the society in various ways, including serving as president and generally attending at conventions.

== Historian ==
From 1890 to 1957, he was the librarian for the Hunterdon County Historical Society. The library is now known as the Hiram E. Deats Memorial Research Library.

From 1891 to 1905, he was editor and publisher of The Jerseyman, a journal of local history and genealogy.

== Honors and awards ==
Deats signed the Roll of Distinguished Philatelists in 1933 and was named to the American Philatelic Society Hall of Fame in 1963.

== See also ==
- Philately
- Philatelic literature
