= Harriet Stewart =

Harriet Stewart may refer to:

- Harriet Stewart, Countess of Galloway (1811–1885)
- Harriet Bradford Tiffany Stewart (1798–1830), American missionary to the Sandwich Islands
