= Quakertown, New Jersey =

Populated place in Hunterdon County, New Jersey, US

- Unincorporated community
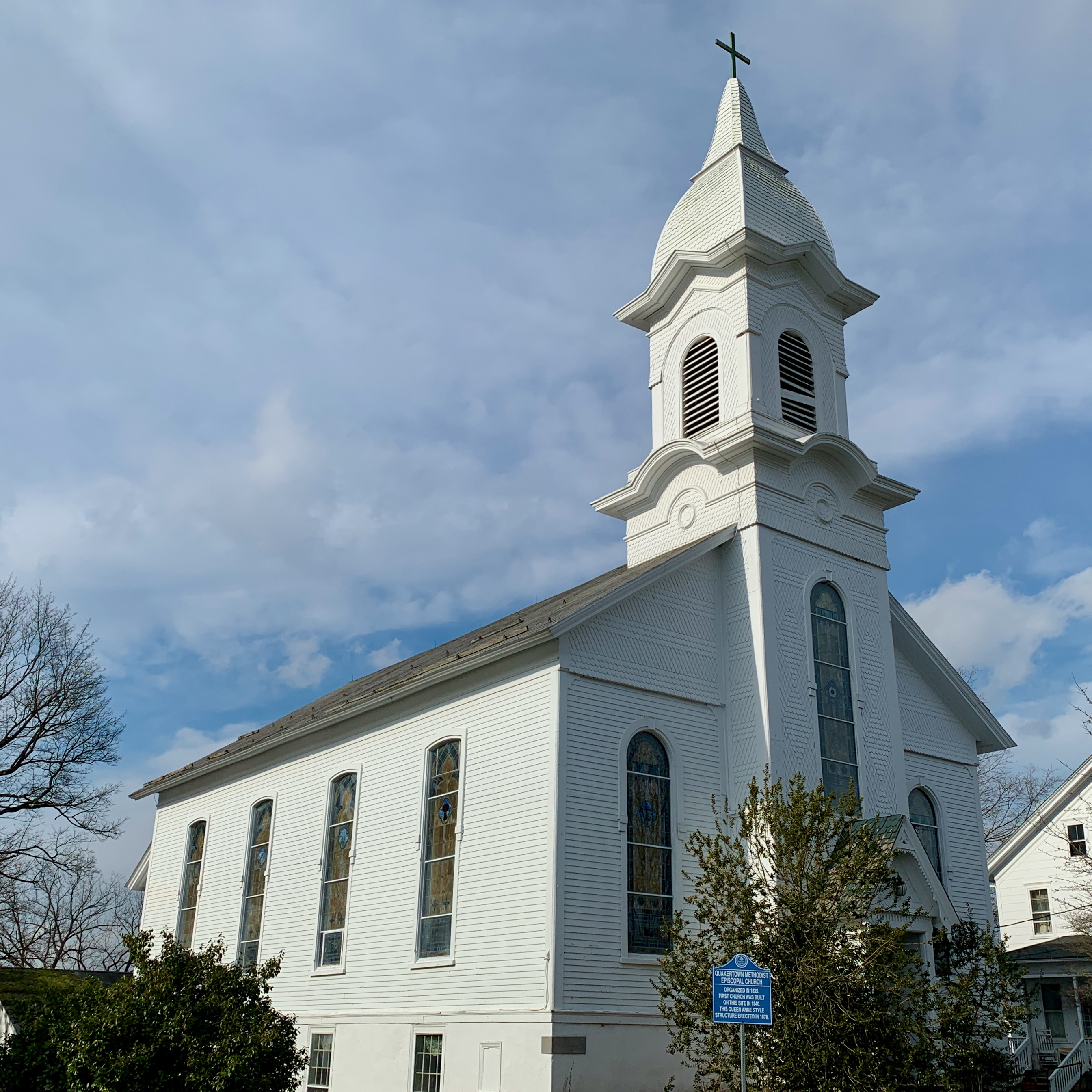
- Quakertown Methodist Episcopal Church

- Location within Hunterdon County, New Jersey Location within New Jersey Location within the United States
- Coordinates: 40°33′56″N 74°56′30″W
- Country: United States
- State: New Jersey
- County: Hunterdon
- Township: Franklin
- Elevation: 650 ft (200 m)
- ZIP Code: 08868
- GNIS feature ID: 879564

Quakertown is an unincorporated community located within Franklin Township in Hunterdon County, New Jersey. It was once known as Fairview. The area was settled by Quakers from Burlington County, who organized a meeting house here in 1733. The Quakertown Historic District was listed on the state and national registers of historic places in 1990.

== History ==
In 1828, local wheelwright, John Deats (1769–1841), invented an iron plow, the Deats plow. In 1831, his son, Hiram Deats (1810–1887), started to make these plows. In 1836, Hiram built a foundry here for plow and stove castings. He later expanded his manufacturing business at Pittstown and Stockton and became the first millionaire in Hunterdon County.

In 1836, a commercial tannery was built here by John Allen. The millstone used for crushing tree bark and extracting tannin is now in front of the Potter/Allen house.

== Historic district ==
- Quakertown Historic District
- U.S. National Register of Historic Places
- U.S. Historic district
- New Jersey Register of Historic Places
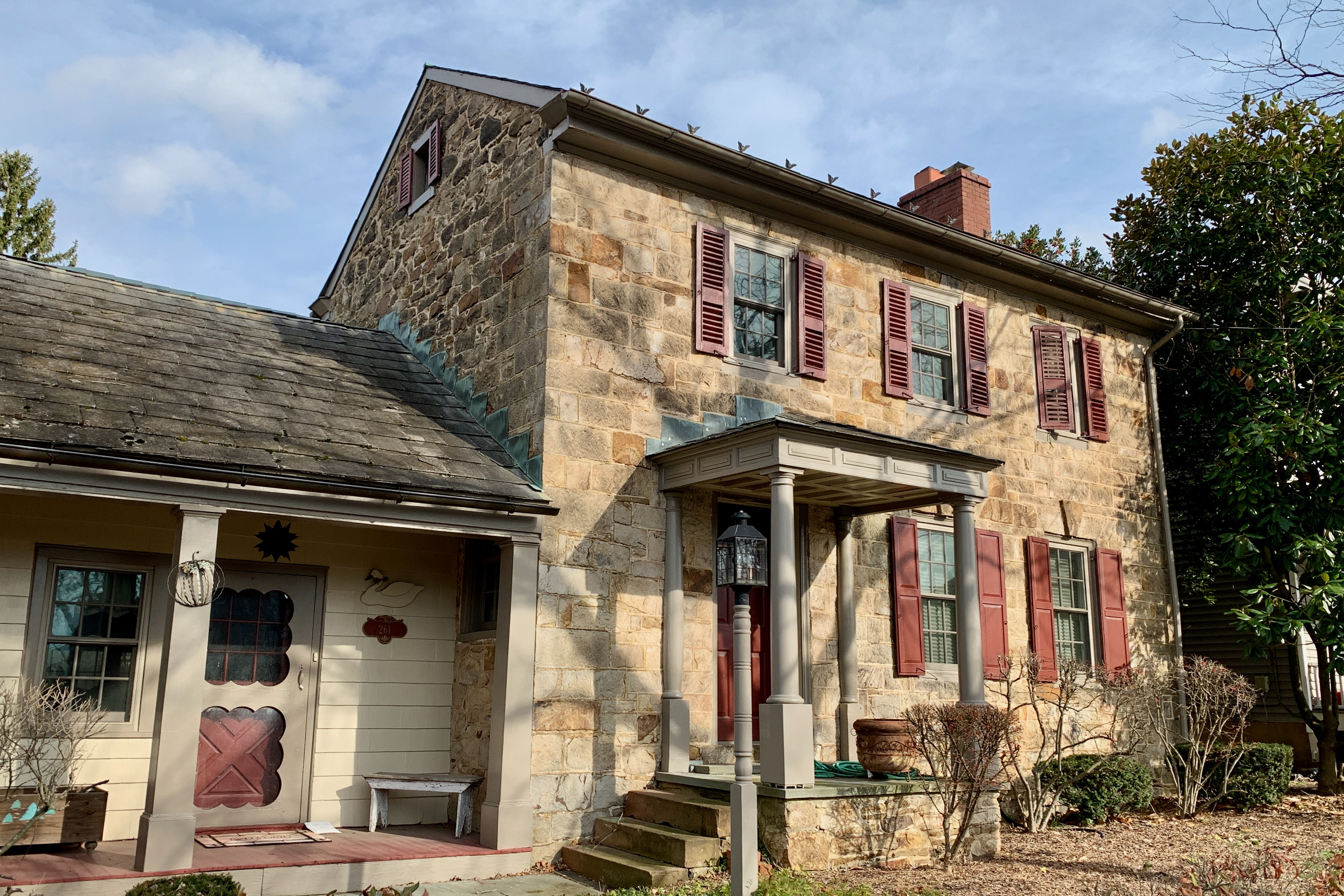
- William Probasco House, built c. 1814
- Location: Roughly bounded by Quakertown, Cherryville Roads, Quaker Lane, and Locust Grove Road
- Area: 78 acres (32 ha)
- Architectural style: Bungalow/craftsman, Greek Revival, Italianate
- NRHP reference No.: 90001242
- NJRHP No.: 1590

Significant dates
- Added to NRHP: August 23, 1990
- Designated NJRHP: February 20, 1990

The Quakertown Historic District is a historic district along Quakertown Road, encompassing the village. It was added to the National Register of Historic Places on August 23, 1990 for its significance in architecture and community development. It includes 74 contributing buildings.

The district includes the Quaker Meeting House, a Friends meeting house, that was reconstructed in 1862 using the stones from the original 1754 building. The Potter/Allen House is a stone house built in 1765. The Federal style William Probasco House was built c. 1814. The Henry Cliffton House is one of the earliest erected buildings in the community. The William Cronce House has an oculus and decorative shingles. The Quakertown Methodist Episcopal Church, built in 1878, features an ornate 3-stage steeple. It is the tenth oldest Methodist Church in the county.

== Notable people ==
People who were born in, residents of, or otherwise closely associated with Quakertown include:

- Hiram Deats (1810–1887), businessman, agricultural manufacturing
- Toshiko Takaezu (1922–2011), ceramic artist and painter

== Gallery ==
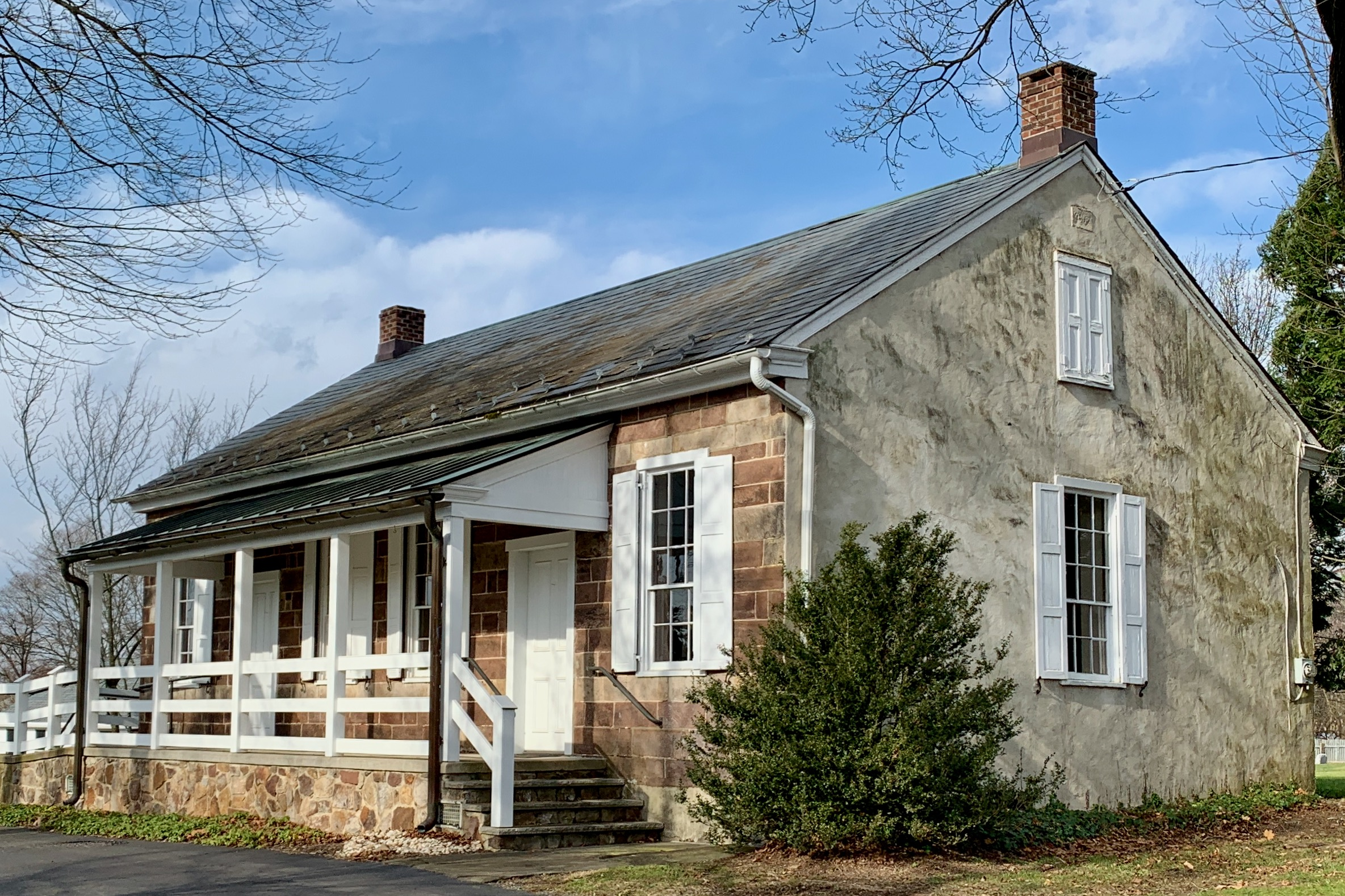
Quaker Meeting House

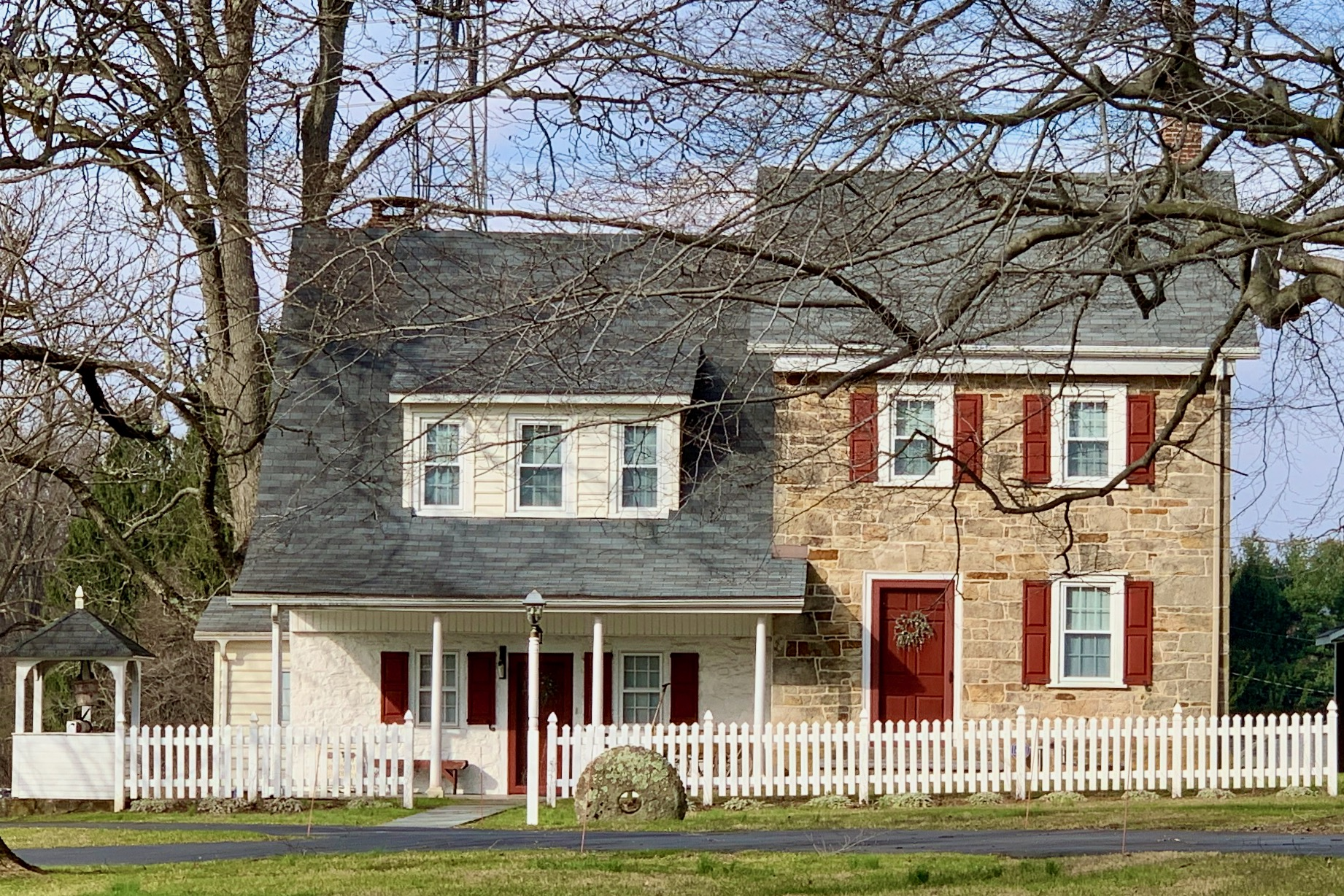
Potter/Allen House

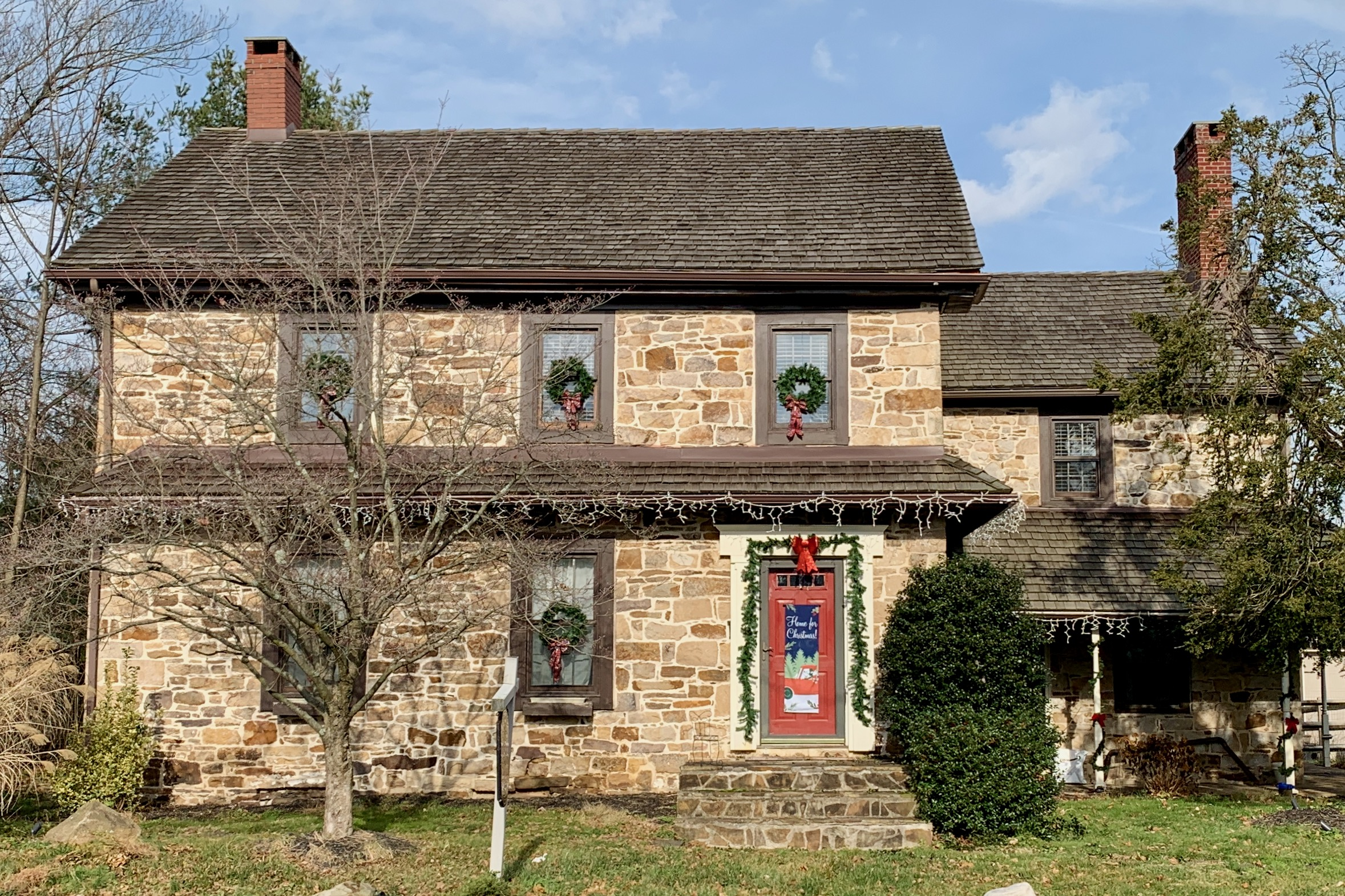
Henry Cliffton House

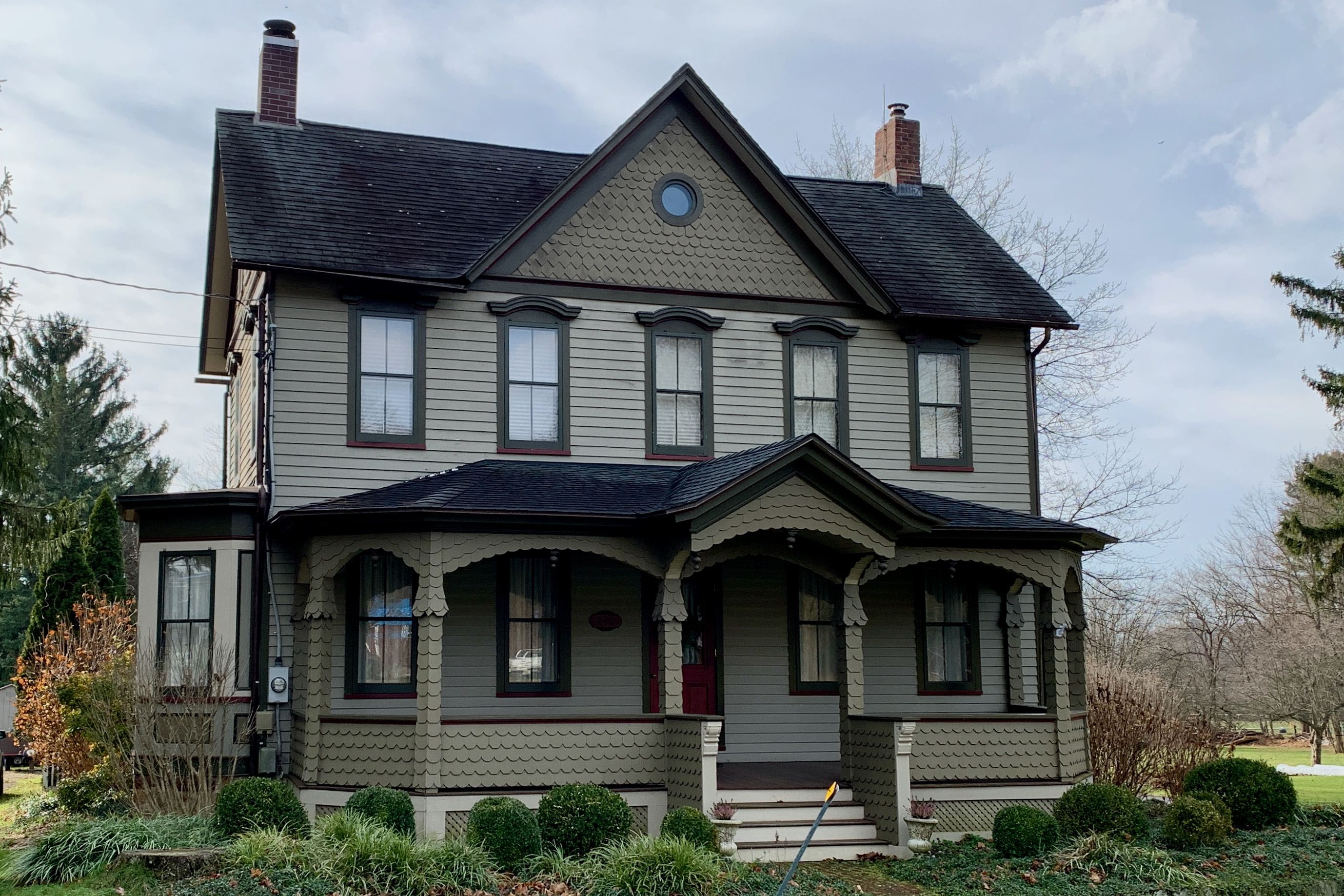
William Cronce House
