= Rockhill Agricultural Historic District =

Historic district in New Jersey, United States

- U.S. National Register of Historic Places
- U.S. Historic district
- New Jersey Register of Historic Places
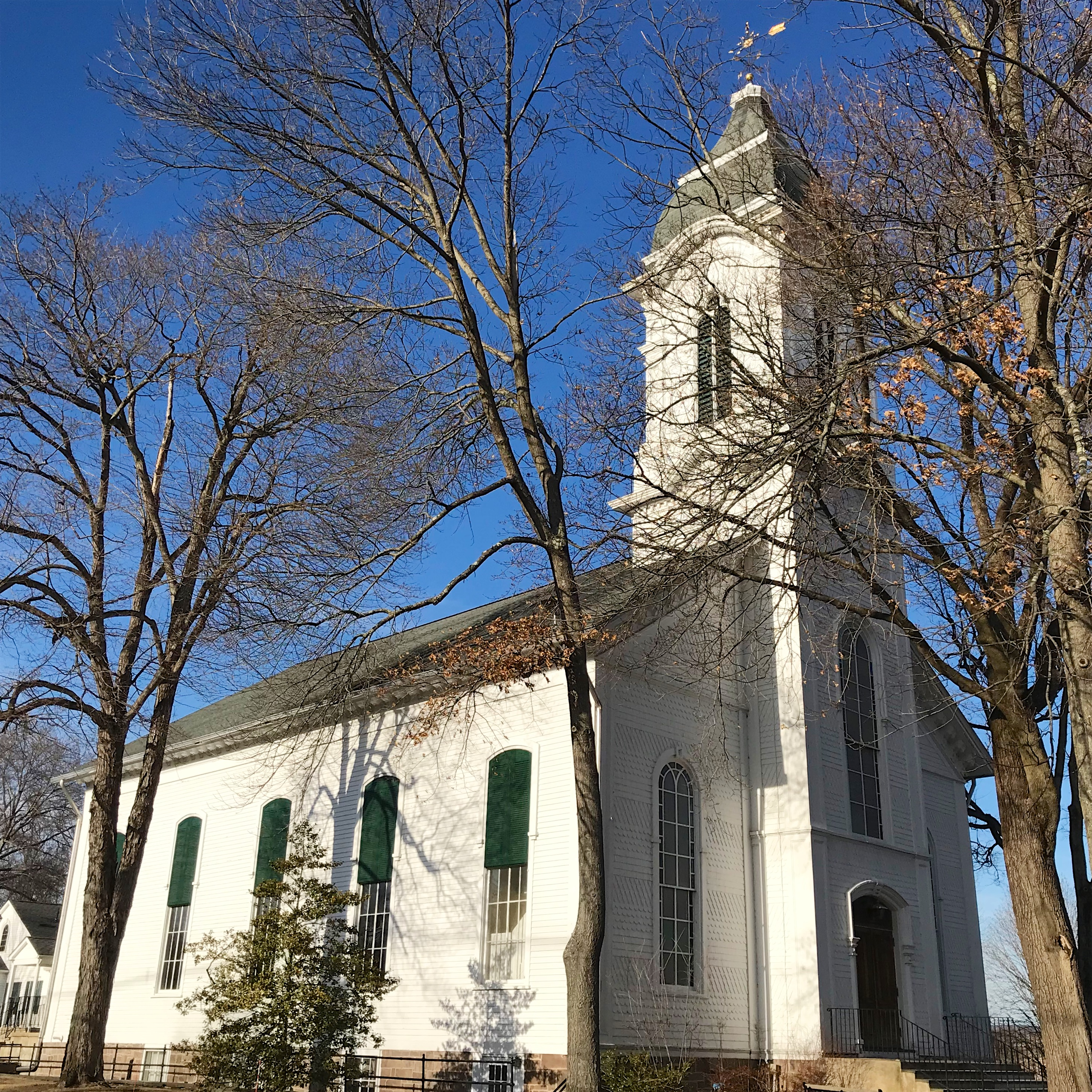
- Bethlehem United Presbyterian Church in 2018

- Location within Hunterdon County, New Jersey Location within New Jersey Location within the United States
- Nearest city: Pittstown, New Jersey
- Coordinates: 40°35′59″N 74°57′12″W
- Area: 1,075 acres (435 ha)
- NRHP reference No.: 84002717
- NJRHP No.: 1637

Significant dates
- Added to NRHP: April 5, 1984
- Designated NJRHP: June 25, 1980

The Rockhill Agricultural Historic District is a 1,075-acre (435 ha) historic district located north of Pittstown along County Route 513 in a southern triangular portion of Union Township in Hunterdon County, New Jersey. A small part of the district extends into Franklin Township. The district was added to the National Register of Historic Places on April 5, 1984, for its significance in agriculture during the 18th and 19th centuries.

== History and description ==
The Bethlehem United Presbyterian Church, now known as the Bethlehem Presbyterian Church, was founded in 1730. The current church building, located in Grandin, New Jersey, was built 1870–1871. It replaced the old stone church built 1830–1831. Charles Stewart, an officer during the American Revolutionary War, is buried in the church cemetery. The two and one-half story stone Rock Hill Farm was built around 1747.

== Gallery ==
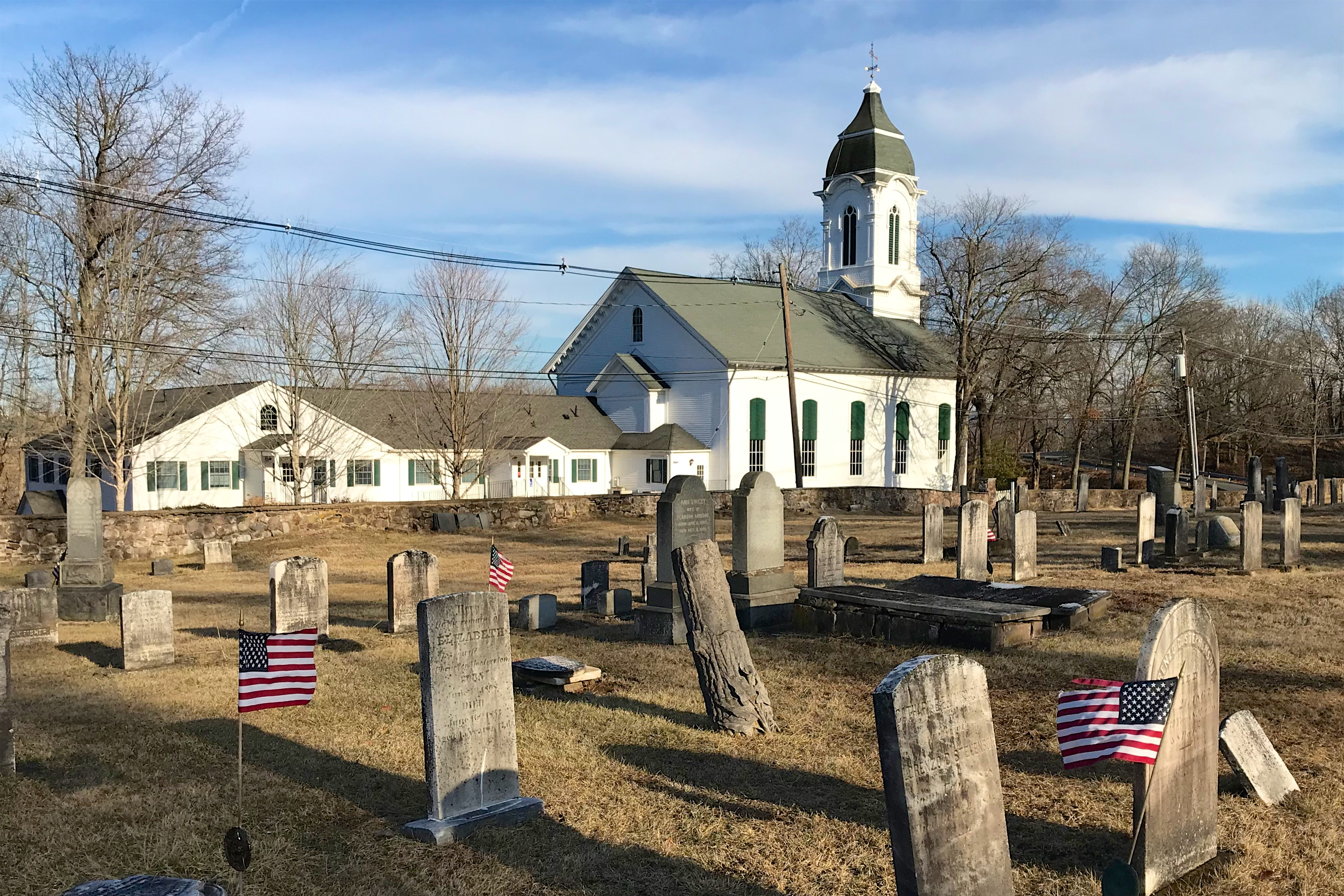
Bethlehem United Presbyterian Church and Cemetery

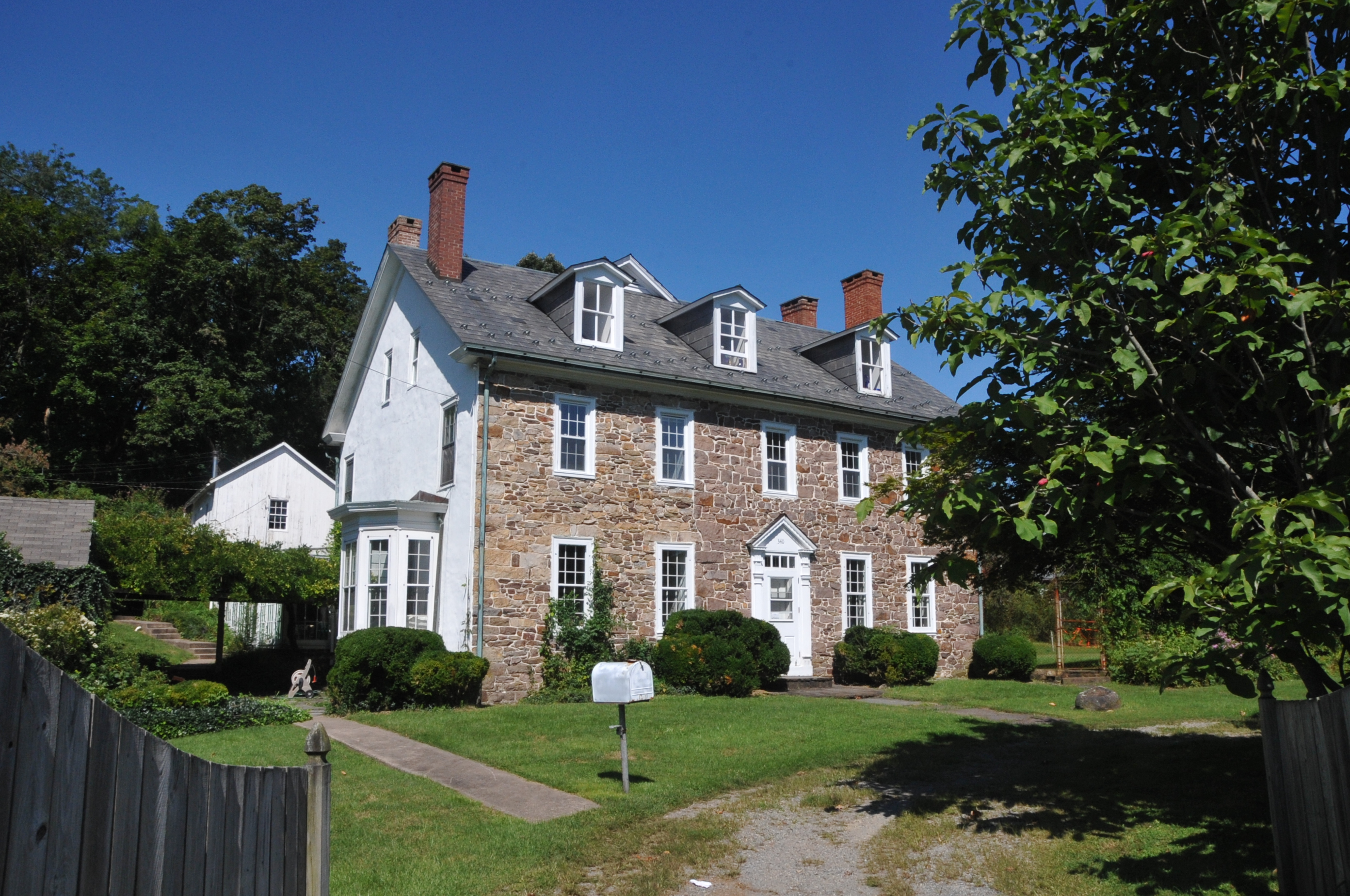
Rock Hill Farm

== See also ==
- National Register of Historic Places listings in Hunterdon County, New Jersey
- Pittstown Historic District
