= Quaker Meeting House (Quakertown, New Jersey) =

Historic church in New Jersey, United States

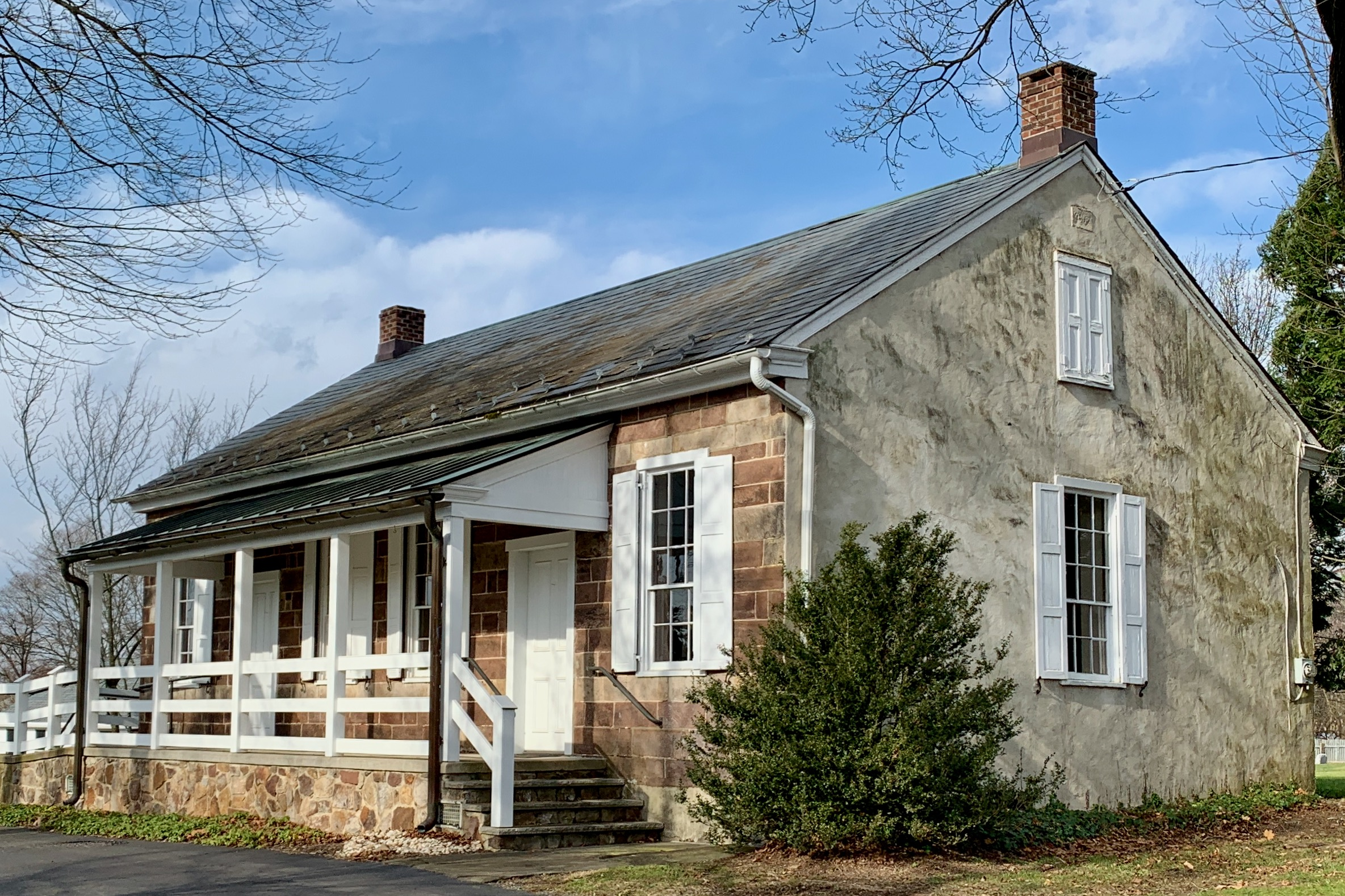
- Quaker Meeting House in 2020

- Location within Hunterdon County, New Jersey
- 40°33′59″N 74°56′37″W
- Location: Quakertown Road, Quakertown, New Jersey
- Denomination: Quaker

Architecture
- Completed: 1862
- Quaker Meeting House
- U.S. Historic district – Contributing property
- Part of: Quakertown Historic District (ID90001242)
- Designated CP: August 23, 1990

The Quaker Meeting House is a historic Friends meeting house at the intersection of Quakertown Road and White Bridge Road in the Quakertown section of Franklin Township in Hunterdon County, New Jersey. In 1733, Quaker settlers acquired four acres of land here and built a log house for their first meeting house. A stone church was built here in 1754. The current building is a reconstruction built in 1862 using the original stones from that church. It is a key contributing property of the Quakertown Historic District, which was added to the National Register of Historic Places on August 23, 1990. The adjoining burial ground is also contributing to the district. The building is the only Quaker meeting house constructed in Hunterdon County.

== Gallery ==
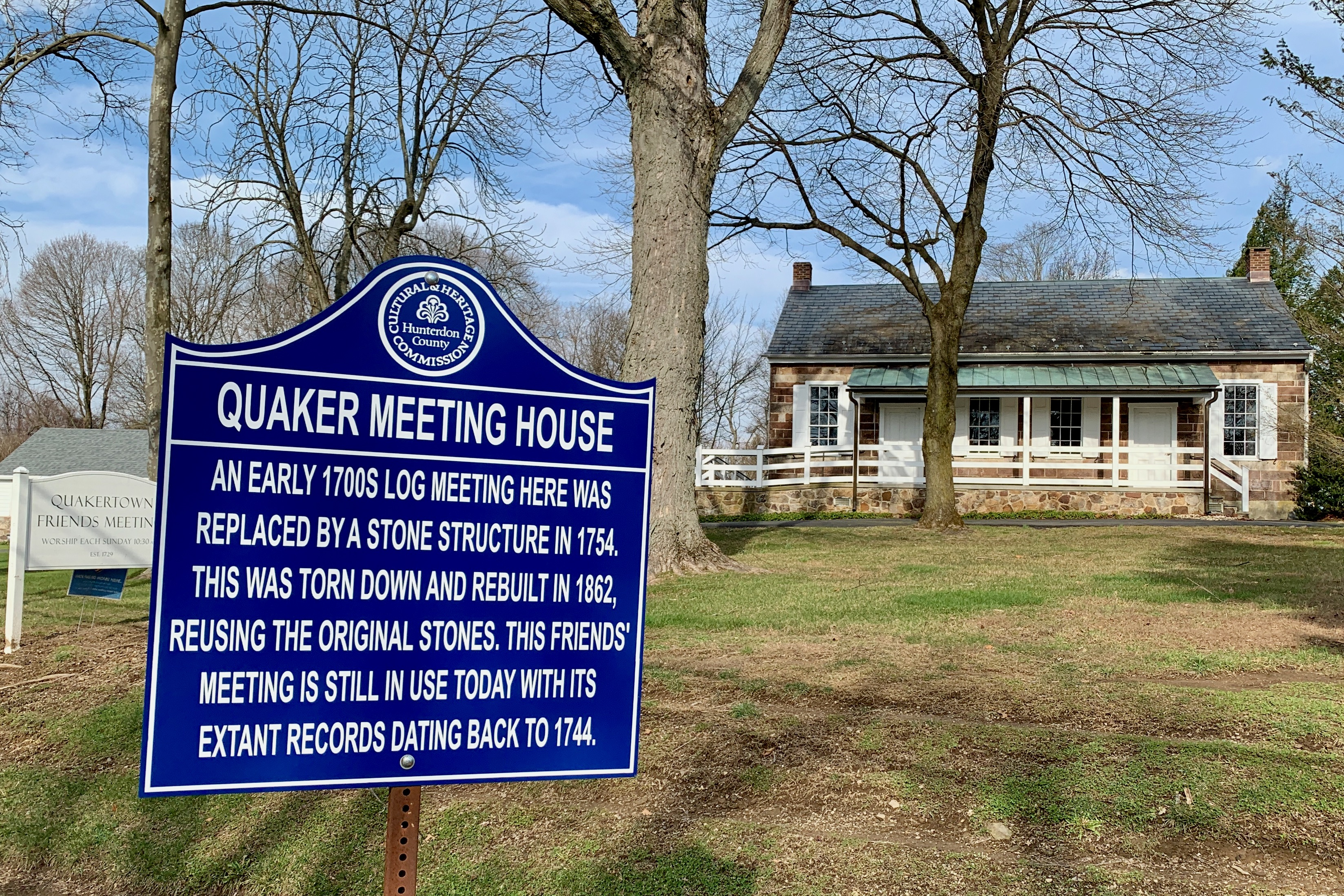
View from Quakertown Road

== See also ==
- National Register of Historic Places listings in Hunterdon County, New Jersey
- List of Quaker meeting houses
