= Hunterdon County Historical Society =

Historical society in New Jersey, US

The Hunterdon County Historical Society is a historical society located in Flemington, New Jersey dedicated to collecting, preserving, and sharing the history of Hunterdon County. The society began in 1885 as one room in the Flemington Public Library by Hiram E. Deats, who served as its librarian from 1891 until his death in 1963. Today, the society operates out of The Doric House, a Greek Revival style home named for its exterior Doric columns. Its collection includes genealogies, Lenni Lenape artifacts, and over 5,000 county documents dating from 1677.
