= Lansdown (Pittstown, New Jersey) =

Historic house in New Jersey, United States

- U.S. National Register of Historic Places
- New Jersey Register of Historic Places
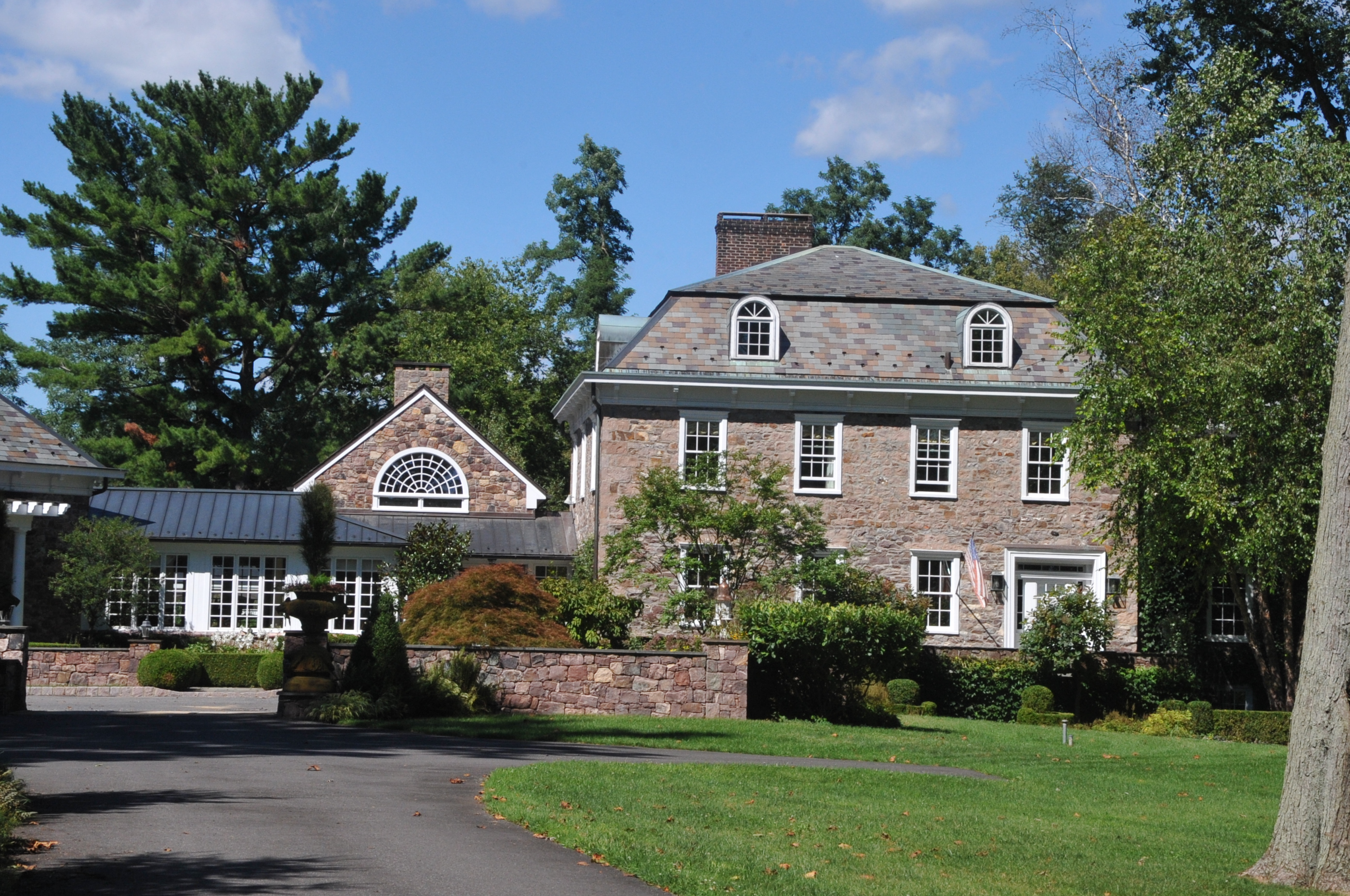

- Location within Hunterdon County, New Jersey Location within New Jersey Location within the United States
- Location: Hamden Road, Lansdowne, New Jersey
- Nearest city: Pittstown, New Jersey
- Coordinates: 40°36′22″N 74°54′24″W
- Area: 49 acres (20 ha)
- Built: 1763
- Architectural style: Greek Revival, Georgian
- NRHP reference No.: 79001497
- NJRHP No.: 1588

Significant dates
- Added to NRHP: November 2, 1979
- Designated NJRHP: July 21, 1979

Lansdown, also known as the Charles Stewart Plantation, is a historic house located on Hamden Road along the South Branch Raritan River in the village of Lansdowne, northeast of Pittstown, in Franklin Township, Hunterdon County, New Jersey. It was added to the National Register of Historic Places on November 2, 1979, for its significance in architecture, military, and politics/government.

The oldest part of the house was probably built c. 1763, when the land was deeded to Charles Stewart by his father-in-law, Justice Samuel Johnston. George Washington and his wife often visited this house.
