= Lansdowne, New Jersey =

Populated place in Hunterdon County, New Jersey, US

- Unincorporated community
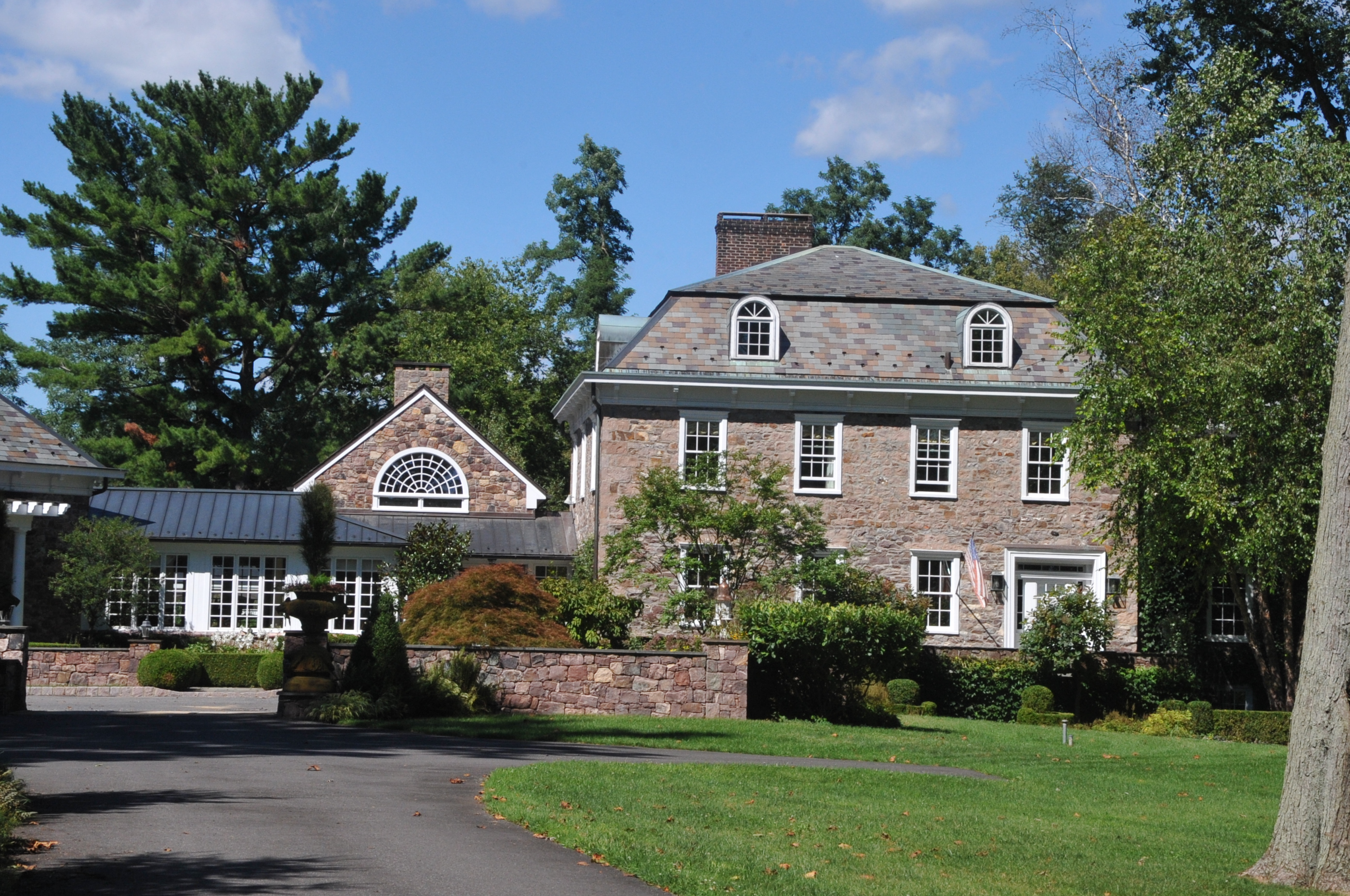
- Historic house Lansdown

- Location of Lansdowne in Hunterdon County Inset: Location of county within the state of New Jersey Lansdowne, New Jersey (New Jersey) Lansdowne, New Jersey (the United States)
- Coordinates: 40°36′30″N 74°54′23″W
- Country: United States
- State: New Jersey
- County: Hunterdon
- Township: Franklin
- Elevation: 167 ft (51 m)
- GNIS feature ID: 877671

Lansdowne (also spelled Landsdown or Lansdown) is an unincorporated community located within Franklin Township in Hunterdon County, New Jersey. It was named after Lansdown, England. Judge Samuel Johnston (1706–1785) owned a large estate here. Charles Stewart (1729–1800) married Mary Oakley Johnston (d. 1771), daughter of the judge, and lived in the mansion built here, Lansdown, which is listed on the National Register of Historic Places.
