= Charles Stewart (New Jersey politician) =

American politician (1729–1800)

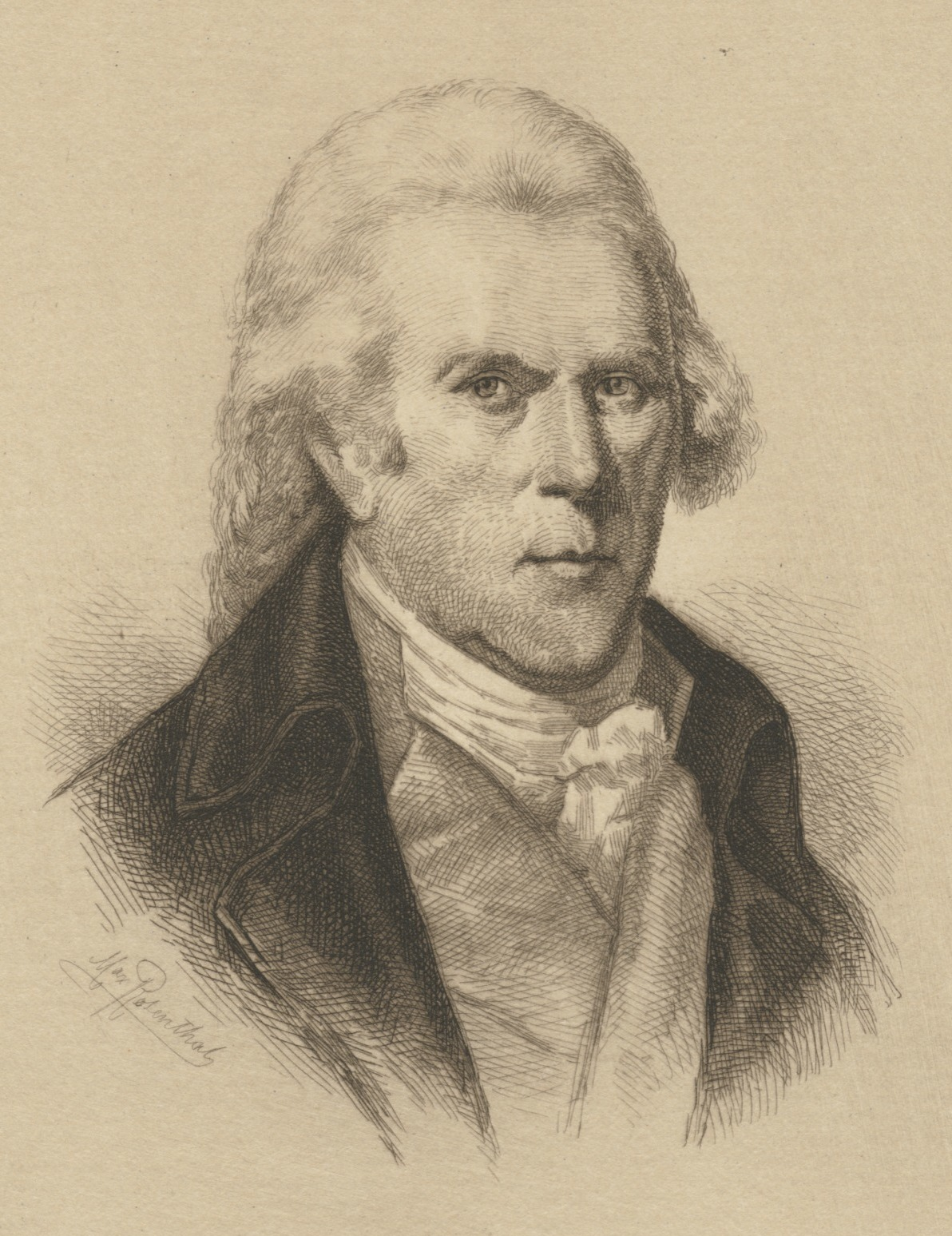

Member of the Second Continental Congress
- In office 1784–1785

Member of the Provincial Congress of New Jersey
- In office 1775–1776

Personal details
- Born: 1729 Gortlea, County Donegal, Ireland
- Died: June 24, 1800 (aged 70–71) Flemington, New Jersey, U.S.
- Resting place: Bethlehem United Presbyterian Church Cemetery; Grandin, New Jersey, U.S.
- Spouse: Mary Oakley Johnston
- Children: Robert Stewart
- Relatives: Farrand Stewart Stranahan (great-grandson); Charles Seaforth Stewart (great-grandson)
- Occupation: soldier; politician
- Military career
- Branch: Continental Army
- Rank: Commissory General
- Conflicts: American Revolutionary War

Charles Stewart (1729 – June 24, 1800) was an officer during the American Revolutionary War and a Continental Congressman.

== Early life ==
Charles Stewart was born in 1729 in Gortlea, County Donegal, Ireland, to Robert Stewart, an Ulster Scots gentleman. His paternal grandfather, Charles Stewart, was an officer of dragoons and fought for William III of England at the Battle of the Boyne. Gortlea was given to his grandfather by William III for his war service. He emigrated to the Thirteen Colonies in 1750 and pursued a career in agriculture. After 1763, he lived at Lansdown, his mansion in Landsdown, New Jersey.

== Personal life ==
Stewart married Mary Oakley Johnston, daughter of Judge Samuel Johnston, who owned a large estate in Hunterdon County, New Jersey.

General Farrand Stewart Stranahan was his great-grandson. Another great-grandson was Charles Seaforth Stewart.

== Career ==
Stewart was commissioned lieutenant colonel of militia in Hunterdon County, New Jersey on April 10, 1771, and commissioned colonel of a battalion of Minutemen on February 15, 1776. He served in four sessions of the Provincial Congress of New Jersey (1775–76).

After the outbreak of war, he was appointed commissary general of issues by the Continental Congress on June 18, 1777. Stewart later became a New Jersey delegate to the Second Continental Congress in 1784 and 1785.

== Death ==
Stewart died June 24, 1800, at a farm he owned on Mt. Carmel (Coxe's Hill) in Flemington. He is interred at the Bethlehem United Presbyterian Church Cemetery in Grandin.

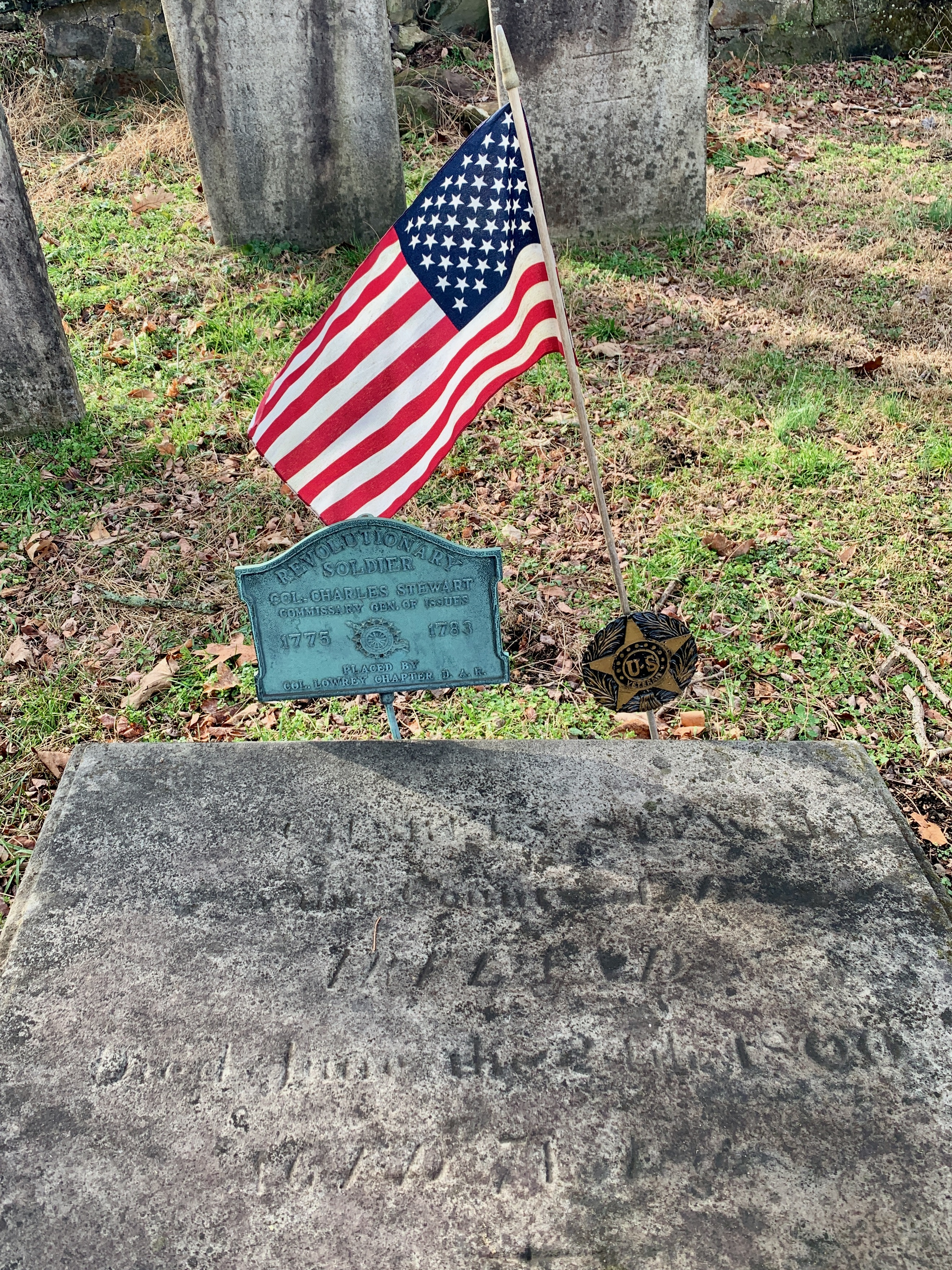
Gravestone of Stewart in Bethlehem Presbyterian Cemetery
