= Charles Seaforth Stewart =

US Army Corps of Engineers colonel

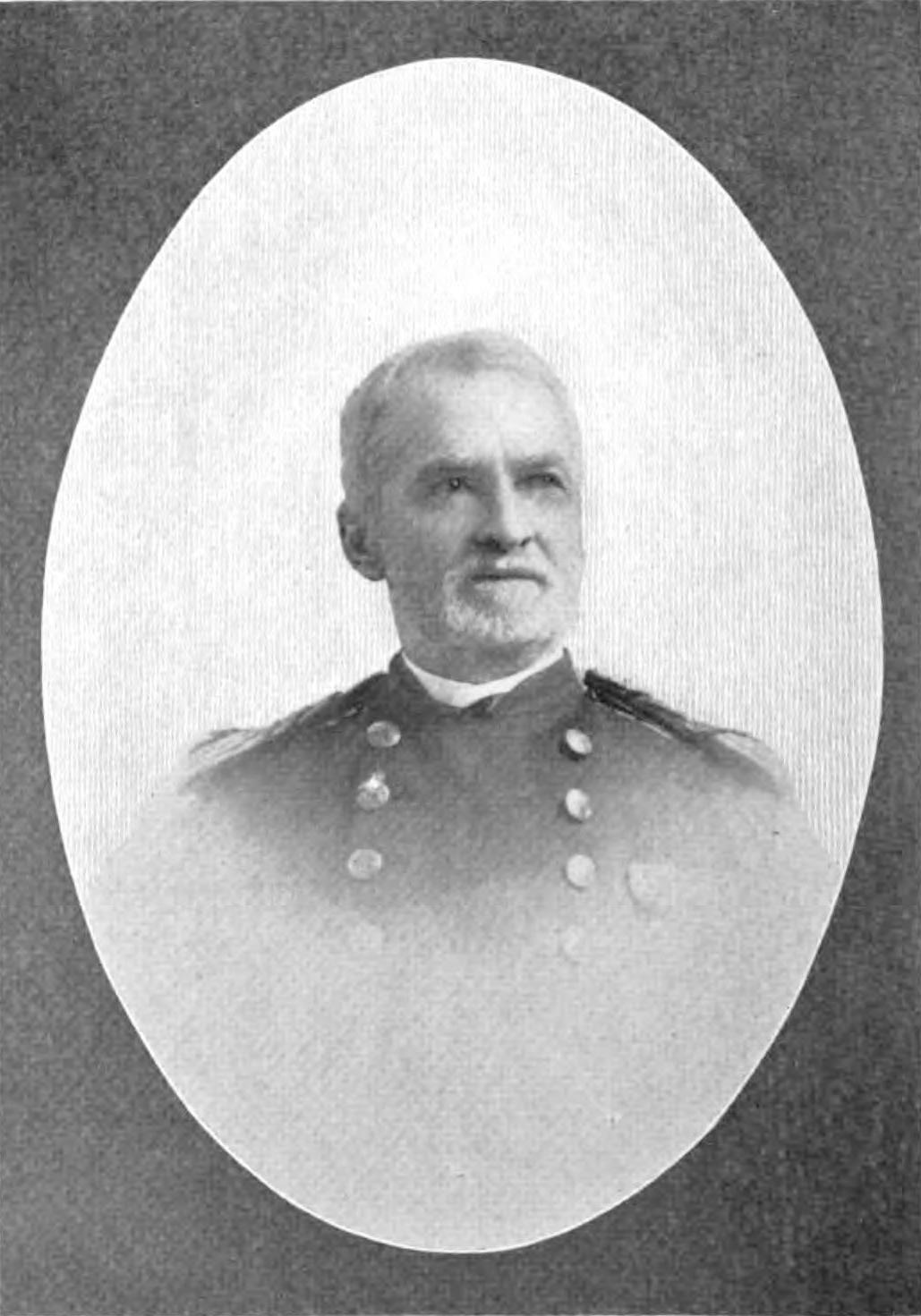
- Born: April 11, 1823; American ship Thames at sea in the Pacific Ocean
- Died: July 22, 1904 (aged 81); Siasconset, Massachusetts, U.S.
- Burial place: Lakewood Cemetery, Cooperstown, New York, U.S. 42°42′22″N 74°54′47″W
- Relatives: Harriet Bradford Tiffany Stewart (mother); Charles Stewart (great-grandfather)
- Military career
- Allegiance: United States of America
- Branch: United States Army Corps of Engineers
- Service years: 1846–1886
- Rank: Colonel (active duty); Brigadier General (retired list)
- Conflicts: American Civil War; Siege of Yorktown; Battle of Williamsburg

Charles Seaforth Stewart (April 11, 1823 – July 22, 1904) was a colonel in the United States Army Corps of Engineers. He graduated first in his West Point Class of 1846, which included future generals George McClellan, Stonewall Jackson, and George Pickett.

== Early life ==
Stewart was born aboard the US ship Thames on April 11, 1823, while the Thames was at sea in the Pacific Ocean. His mother was Harriet Bradford (née Tiffany), and his father, Reverend Charles Samuel Stewart was a US Navy chaplain. Stewart's ancestors included great-grandfather Charles Stewart.

Stewart was raised and educated in Cooperstown, New York, and Princeton, New Jersey. At age 17, Stewart began the first of three sea journeys as the captain's clerk aboard the U.S.S. Brandywine. In 1842, he began attendance at the United States Military Academy. Stewart graduated in 1846, ranked first of the 59 students in his class, which entitled him to a coveted assignment in the Corps of Engineers.

== Start of career ==
Stewart specialized in seacoast construction and his first posting was as assistant engineer planning and overseeing the construction of Fort Trumbull, Connecticut. Beginning in 1847, he carried out a similar assignment at Fort Warren, Massachusetts. From 1849 to 1854, Stewart was assistant professor of engineering at West Point. He returned to Fort Warren in 1854, and was superintending engineer of construction there and at nearby Forts Independence and Winthrop. From 1859 to 1861, Stewart was superintending engineer for the Great Brewster and Deer Island seawalls outside Boston Harbor.

== Civil War ==
Stewart served primarily in Virginia during the American Civil War and his postings between 1861 and 1865 included: assistant engineer and chief engineer of the defenses at Hampton Roads (1861-1864); supervising engineer of the field works constructed in Newport News (1861); assistant engineer during the Siege of Yorktown (1862); assistant engineer during the Battle of Williamsburg (1862); and reconnoitering with the advance party of the forces commanded by George Stoneman between Williamsburg and Mechanicsville (1862).

Following a period of illness and convalescence at Fort Monroe, Stewart's later wartime postings included: consulting engineer during the defense of Suffolk, Virginia (1863); consulting engineer for construction of the defenses of Portsmouth and Norfolk (1863); consulting engineer during demonstrations outside of Richmond (1863); supervising engineer for construction of defenses at Port Lookout, Maryland (1864); chief engineer of the Middle Military Division (1864-1865); and special duty in Baltimore and Cumberland, Maryland (1865), followed by special duty at Fort Clinch, Florida (1865). Stewart received brevet promotion to lieutenant colonel in recognition of his wartime service.

== Later career ==
After the war, Stewart was superintending engineer of the defenses of the Delaware River and Delaware Bay (1865-1870). From 1870 to 1886, he was a member of the board of engineers that planned the defenses of the Pacific Coast, a duty he carried out while serving as superintending engineer of construction of Fort Point, Point San Jose, and Angel Island in San Francisco Harbor.

In 1872, Stewart supervised the removal of Rincon Rock from San Francisco Harbor. In 1872 and 1872, he led the team that examined the seawalls and breakwaters at Trinidad Harbor, Santa Cruz, and Estero Bay. Between 1873 and 1886, Stewart was superintending engineer of construction of the fort at San Diego, leader of the team that examined the estuary in Santa Barbara Channel, and the team that surveyed the San Joaquin River below Stockton. In 1874 and 1875, he supervised the removal of the wreck of the SS Patrician and the outcropping known as Noonday Rock from San Francisco Harbor. Between 1875 and 1886, Stewart oversaw improvements to the harbor in San Diego Bay, and the San Joaquin River. He also oversaw the survey of the Colorado River between Fort Yuma and Dorado Canyon in 1879, examination of the harbors of San Luis Obispo, San Buenaventura, and Santa Barbara in 1879, and survey of Trinidad Harbor from 1879 to 1880. From 1880 until his retirement, Stewart was chief engineer of the 12th Lighthouse District, examined and surveyed the channel for San Diego Harbor, constructed a breakwater for the San Luis Obispo Harbor, and served on several engineer boards that planned River and Harbor Improvements.

== Retirement and death ==
Stewart was promoted to colonel in June 1882. He retired in 1886, and lived in Cooperstown. In 1904, he was promoted to brigadier general on the retired list in recognition of the superior service he rendered throughout his career. He died in Siasconset, Massachusetts, on July 22, 1904, and was buried at Lakewood Cemetery in Cooperstown.
