= Hiram Deats =

American businessman (1810–1887)

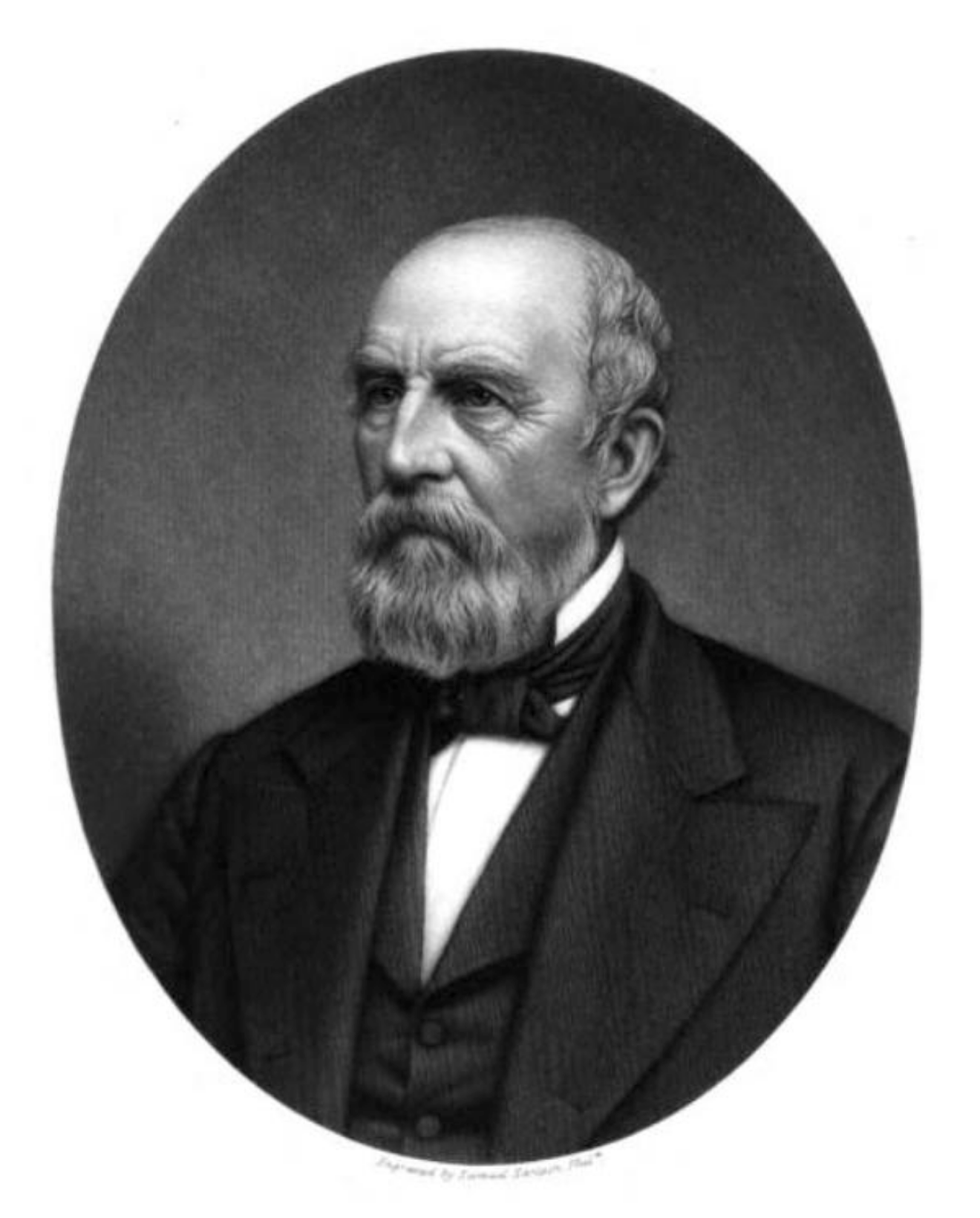
- Born: April 12, 1810
- Died: November 22, 1887 (aged 77)
- Known for: Manufacture of the Deats Plow

Hiram Deats (April 12, 1810 – November 22, 1887) was an American businessman from Hunterdon County, New Jersey. He was known for manufacturing agricultural equipment, especially the Deats plow, and became the first millionaire in Hunterdon County.

== Life and family ==
Hiram Deats was born on April 12, 1810, to John Deats (1769–1841) and Ursula Barton (1767–1853). His first marriage was in 1838 to Rebecca Higgins (1820–1862) of Hillsborough Township. They had four children, including Lemuel Madison Deats (1845–1879). His second marriage was in 1865 to Elmira Stevenson (1830–1908) of LaSalle County, Illinois. They had one son, Hiram Edmund Deats (1870–1963), who was born in the Brookville section of Stockton.

He died on November 22, 1887, and is buried in the Cherryville Baptist Cemetery.

== Business ==
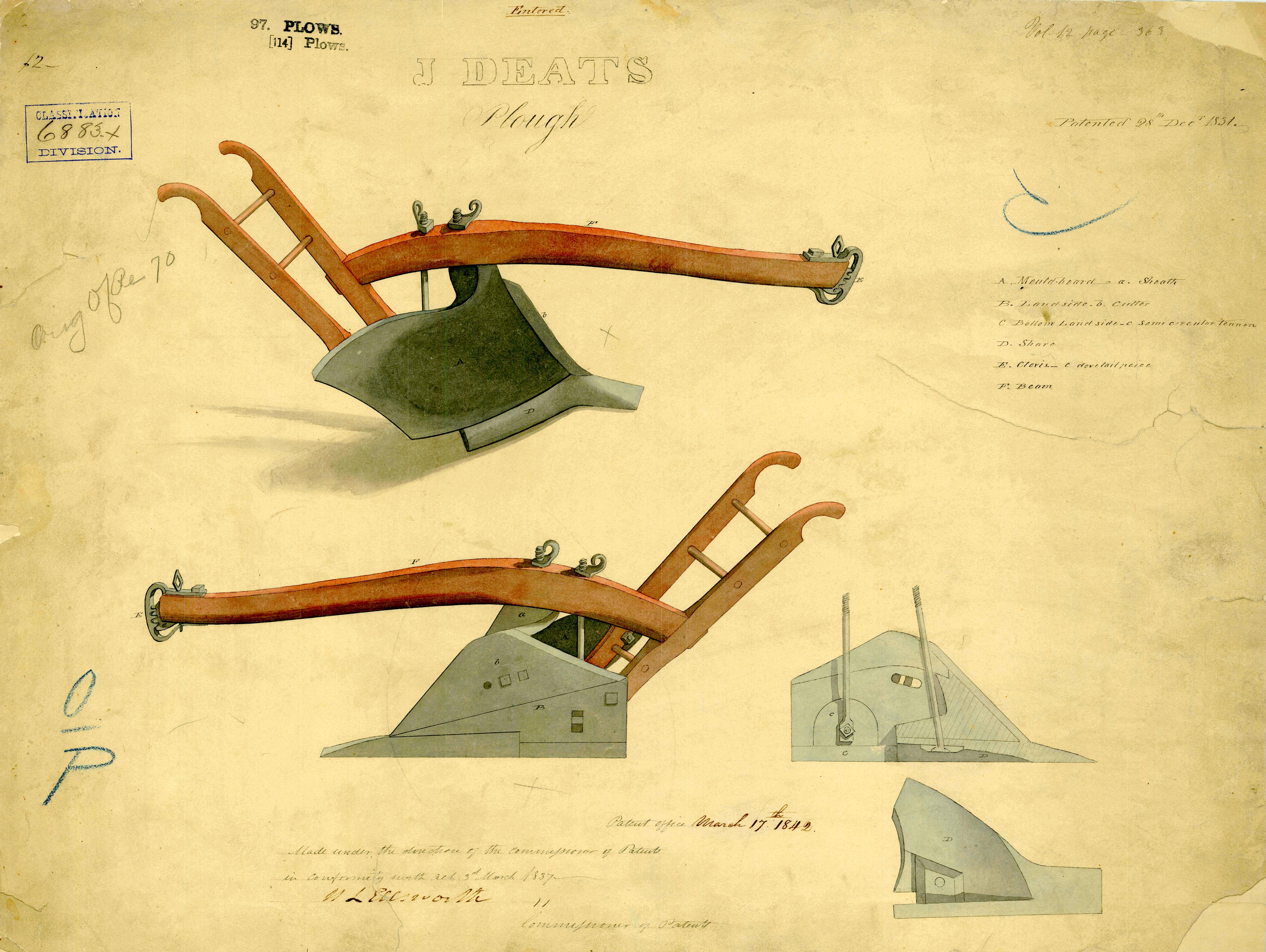
Patent Diagram for the Deats Plow

In 1831, he started to make the Deats plow, first patented by his father in 1828, and again in 1831. In 1836, he built a foundry at his farm near Quakertown, New Jersey, for both plow and stove castings. In 1845, following the death of his father, as administrator, he was granted a reissue of the 1831 patent. In 1852, he expanded his operations by moving stove casting to Stockton and building a new machine-shop at Pittstown to produce other agricultural equipment. In 1859, he moved to live in Pittstown and built a foundry there, moving operations from Quakertown. There he manufactured agricultural equipment: threshing machines, mowers, corn shellers, and reapers. In 1866, he founded the firm Deats, Case & Co. with partners William J. Case, Rhutson Case and his son, Lemuel M. Deats. The firm became known as L. M. Deats & Co. later. His nephew, Hiram Deats Jr. (1853–1928), son of his brother, Gilbert Deats (1808–1870), ran the company until 1904.

== Legacy ==
In 1929, his son, Hiram Edmund Deats, donated several pieces of agricultural equipment, including a Deats plow, made by the Deats company to Rutgers University for their museum, which later became the New Jersey Museum of Agriculture. Additional ones are on display at the Red Mill Museum Village in Clinton and the Holcombe-Jimison Farm Museum in Lambertville.
