= New Jersey Museum of Agriculture =

Former agriculture museum in North Brunswick, New Jersey

- Established: 1990
- Dissolved: 2011
- Location: North Brunswick, New Jersey, U.S.
- Type: Agriculture

The New Jersey Museum of Agriculture was an American agriculture museum, located in North Brunswick, New Jersey, and focused on the evolution of agriculture in New Jersey.

The museum's exhibits included farm tools and machinery, household implements, scientific instruments, trade tools, farm vehicles, early electrical appliances and a general store. Other displays told the story of important agricultural crops in New Jersey, including apples, cranberries, tomatoes, blueberries, corn and potatoes.

== History and operations ==
The museum opened in 1990 and was located on the campus of the School of Environmental and Biological Sciences of Rutgers University at 103 College Farm Road. It featured the collection of Professor Wabun C. Krueger, including the Deats plow, patented in 1828 by John Deats of Hunterdon County and manufactured by his son, Hiram Deats. The museum was closed in 2011 due to state budget cuts.

Part of the museum's collection of photographs of farms and barns in Monmouth and Mercer Counties were donated to the Monmouth County Archives.

== Building ==
After the museum closed, the land and the 30,000 square-foot building reverted to Rutgers University, and the building was used as classrooms and storage space for several years. From 2016 - 2019, the George Street Playhouse leased the building while their original location was razed for the construction of the downtown New Brunswick Performing Arts Center. In 2019, Rutgers announced plans to convert the former museum into a makerspace. Rutgers sought funding from the New Jersey Economic Development Authority to assess building-code requirements and compete the conceptual design for a proposed 20,000 square-foot "Mega-Makerspace" in the former museum building.

== See also ==
- Agriculture in the United States
- List of museums in New Jersey
