= John Deats =

American wheelwright and plow inventor

- Born: February 1, 1769
- Died: May 1, 1841 (aged 72)
- Known for: Invention of the Deats plow

John Deats (February 1, 1769 – May 1, 1841) was an American wheelwright and inventor of the Deats plow from Hunterdon County, New Jersey.

== Life and family ==
John Deats was born in 1769 to William Deats (also spelled Deitz), a German immigrant, and wife Mary at their home about four miles northwest of Flemington. He married Ursula Barton (1767–1853) and they had four children: Elisha Deats (1800–1862), Rhoda Deats Thurston (1803–1880), Gilbert Deats (1808–1870), and Hiram Deats (1810–1887).

He was a wheelwright, like his father, and worked in that trade. After designing a plow and unable to find a manufacturer locally, he moved west. He died in Newark, Ohio in 1841.

== Deats plow ==
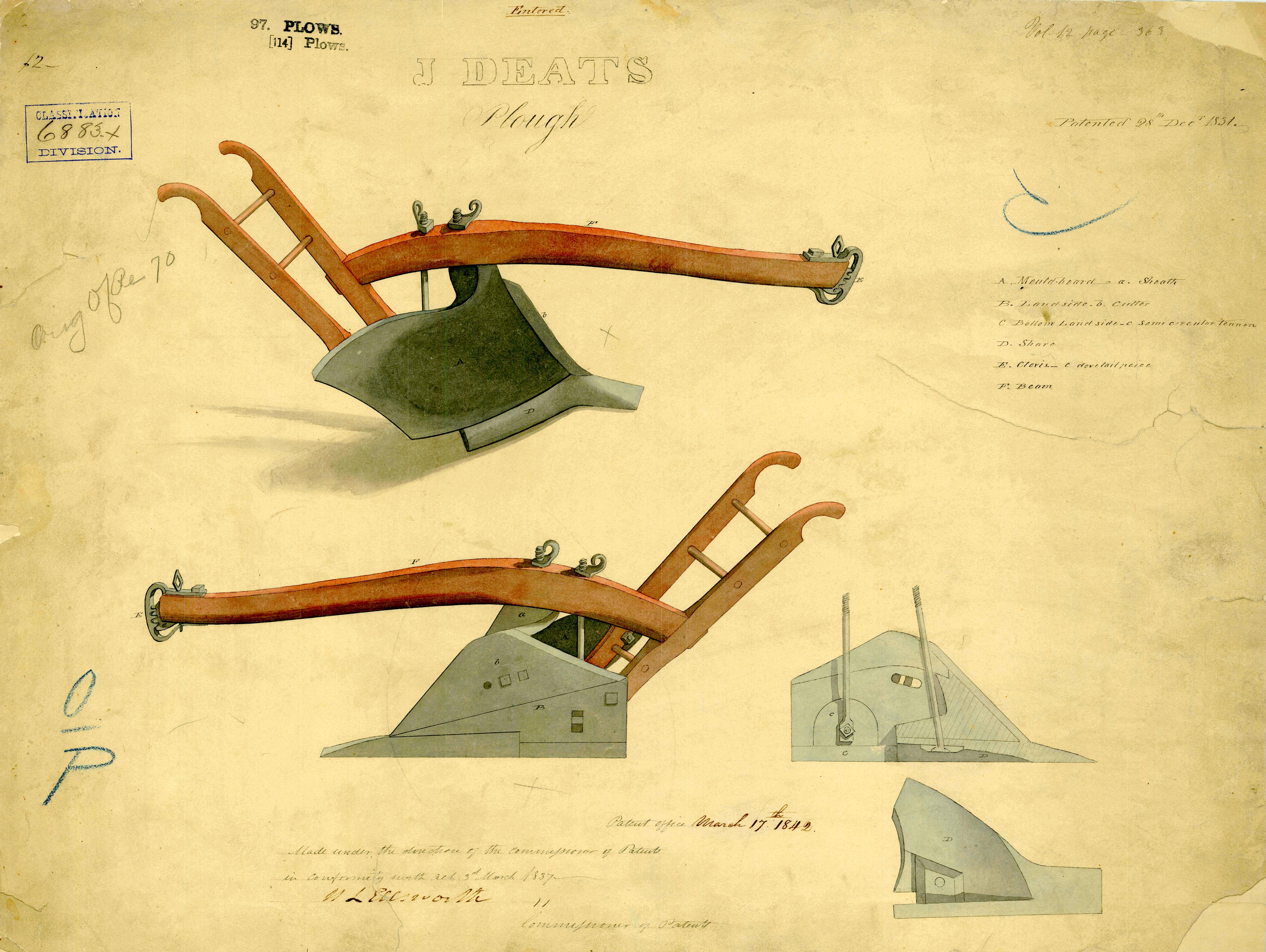
Patent Diagram for the Deats Plow

After experimenting in building plows, Deats was issued a patent for an improved plow in 1828. He was issued another patent in 1831, which detailed improvements in the moldboard, main landside, bottom landside, cutter, share, plate of iron under the share, and clevis. After his death, his son, Hiram Deats, as administrator, was granted a reissue of this 1831 patent on May 16, 1845. The plow was successfully manufactured and sold by Hiram for many years. The improved moldboard was said to scour better than others. Hiram's nephew, Hiram Deats Jr. (1853–1928), son of Gilbert Deats (1808–1870), later ran the company at Pittstown until 1904.

== Legacy ==
In 1929, his grandson, Hiram Edmund Deats, donated several pieces of agricultural equipment, including a Deats plow, made by the Deats company to Rutgers University for their agricultural museum under the care of Professor Wabun C. Krueger. This collection became important in the creation of the New Jersey Museum of Agriculture in 1990.
