= Grandin, New Jersey =

Populated place in Hunterdon County, New Jersey, US

- Unincorporated community
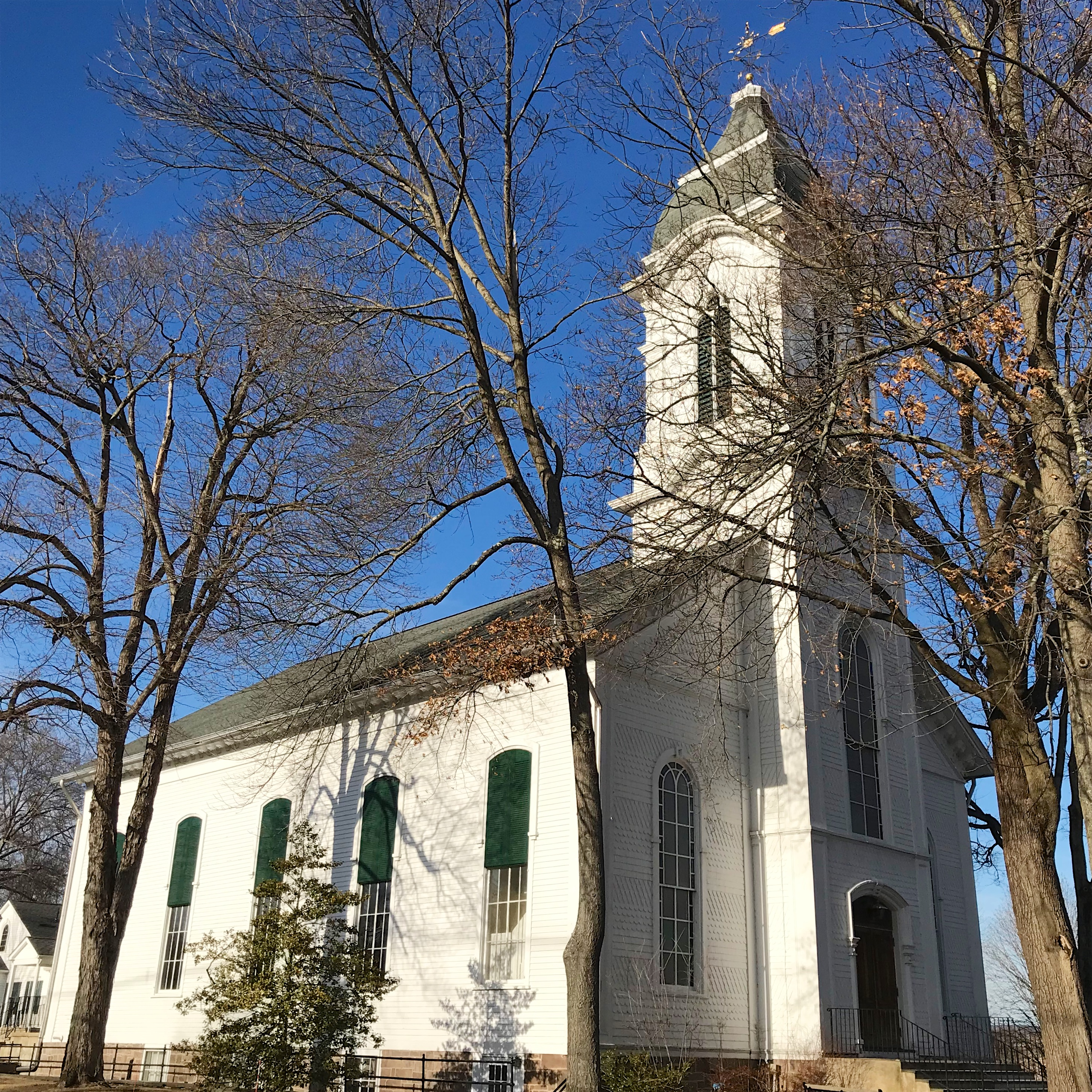
- Bethlehem United Presbyterian Church, the Grandin Church

- Location of Grandin in Hunterdon County Inset: Location of county within the state of New Jersey Grandin (New Jersey) Grandin (the United States)
- Coordinates: 40°37′03″N 74°56′02″W
- Country: United States
- State: New Jersey
- County: Hunterdon
- Township: Franklin and Union
- Elevation: 253 ft (77 m)
- GNIS feature ID: 876705

Grandin is an unincorporated community located along the border of Franklin and Union townships in Hunterdon County, New Jersey, United States.

The Bethlehem United Presbyterian Church, also known as the Grandin Church, is a contributing property of the Rockhill Agricultural Historic District, listed on the National Register of Historic Places.

The Norfolk Southern Railway's Lehigh Line (formerly the mainline of the Lehigh Valley Railroad), runs through the community.
