= Cherryville, Oregon =

Unincorporated community in Oregon, US

- Unincorporated community
- Location within Oregon Location within the United States
- Coordinates: 45°22′01″N 122°09′18″W
- Country: United States
- State: Oregon
- County: Clackamas
- Elevation: 1,280 ft (390 m)
- Time zone: UTC-8 (Pacific (PST))
  - Summer (DST): UTC-7 (PDT)
- GNIS feature ID: 1139605

Cherryville is an unincorporated community and former town in Clackamas County, Oregon, United States, founded in 1884. It is located approximately 6 miles (9.7 km) east of Sandy on U.S. Route 26, near the route of the Barlow Road.

The town population had dwindled to 50 in 1915, and the majority of the town was demolished in 1950 after the construction of the Mount Hood Highway. The Cherryville Cemetery still exists, and in 2014 was designated as a local historic site.

== History ==
The name of the community is said to have come from the wild cherries that grew in the area. Cherryville post office was established in 1884 and closed in 1958. In 1915, Cherryville had a population of 50, a public school, and a church. Contemporarily church building is gone, but the church cemetery still exists. The majority of the town was demolished in 1950 upon the construction of the Mount Hood Highway. In 2014, the cemetery at Cherryville was formally marked and designated a local historic site.
