= Harriet Bradford Tiffany Stewart =

American missionary

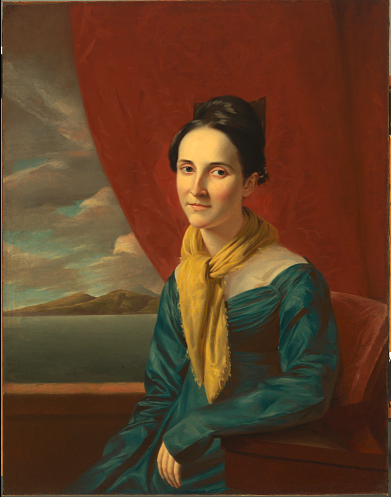
Harriet Bradford Tiffany Stewart

Harriet Bradford Tiffany Stewart (June 24, 1798 – September 6, 1830) was an American missionary to the Sandwich Islands.

== Early life ==
Harriet Bradford Tiffany was born near Stamford, Connecticut, on June 24, 1798. Her father, Isaiah Tiffany (1759-1800), was an officer in the Continental Army, and her mother Anne Whiting (1762-1830) was a descendant of William Bradford, the leader of the pilgrims of Leiden, and for thirty years, the governor of Plymouth Colony.

When a child, Stewart was known for a sweet disposition and a lively sensibility. Gouverneur Morris, who was in the habit of meeting her at the springs of Lebanon, often spoke of her as presenting at this period one of the most perfect pictures of beautiful childhood he had ever seen.

Stewart's father died while she was very young, and she passed her youth chiefly under the guardianship of an uncle, in Albany, New York. But the marriage of an elder sister, in 1815, to a gentleman of Cooperstown, New York, led her from that time to make his house her home. The appointment of her brother, soon after, to the rectorship of the Episcopal Church in that village, brought all the members of her family closer together.

The two or three succeeding years were to her a period of much enjoyment. But it was not until the occurrence of a protracted and dangerous illness, in the summer of 1819, that she became convinced of the necessity of spiritual peace. It was two years after her recovery, in the autumn of 1821, that she received a marriage proposal from the Rev. Charles Samuel Stewart, who had been a US Navy chaplain, but was then just appointed by the American Board of Foreign Missions as a missionary to the Sandwich Islands. In January 1822, after the decision to accept the marriage proposal was finalized, Stewart returned to Cooperstown, to pass a few weeks with her family, and to prepare for her departure. On June 3, 1822, she married, at Albany.

== Career ==
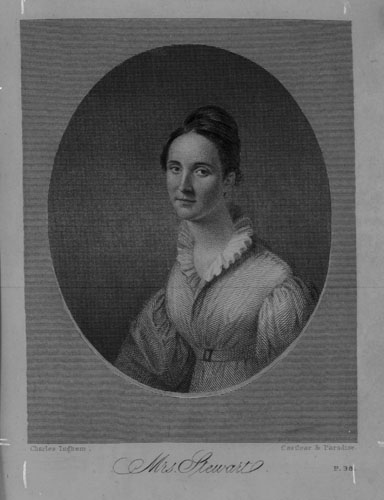
Harriet Stewart, 1822

On November 19, 1822, in a company of some thirty missionaries with whom they were to be associated, Stewart and her husband embarked at New Haven, Connecticut, on the ship Thames under Captain Clasby. Their son, Charles Seaforth Stewart, was born while at sea on April 11, 1823. On April 27, they arrived at Honolulu, Oahu, the principal port of the Sandwich Islands.

In the appointments of the missionaries to the different islands of the group, soon after their landing, Mr. and Mrs. Stewart and Mr. and Mrs. William Richards were assigned to Maui, three days’ sail from Oahu. Here, at the town of Lahaina, in the midst of 20,000 Native Hawaiians, they took up their residence. Their new home consisted of two small native huts, each of a single apartment, and furnished with mats, their trunks, and a few seats and tables made of the packing boxes they had carried from the U.S. But great as was this change to Mrs. Stewart, from the luxuries to which she had been accustomed, she felt content, as stated in a letter dated January 1, 1824. About six months afterward, she wrote to her friends,—

"We are most contented and most happy, and rejoice that God has seen fit to honor and bless us by permitting us to be the bearers of his light and truth to this dark corner of the earth. Could you feel the same gladness that often fills our bosoms, in witnessing the happy influence of the Gospel on the minds and hearts of many of these interesting creatures, you would be satisfied, yes more than satisfied, that we should be what we are, and where we are, poor missionaries in the distant islands of the sea."

== Later life and death ==
Stewart's health continued to be good until March 1825, when some overexertion during the illness of nearly all the other missionary members laid the foundation of a disease which in a few weeks, brought her near death. While she was in this condition, the Sandwich Islands were visited by Lord Byron, in the Blonde ship of war, and he offered her a passage to Hawaii, which was accepted. But the change of air during a month in which the ship was refitting for the sea did not benefit Stewart, so it was decided by the mission, under the advice of several physicians, for Mr. Stewart to return with her to the United States. They accordingly availed themselves of an opportunity to sail for London, where they arrived in April 1826. Mrs. Stewart was now in a state of helplessness, but after spending three months in England, she was able to continue her homeward voyage, embarking near the end of July. She reached New York after a pleasant passage; and on September 13, 1826, was reunited with her friends in the valley of Otsego.

Stewart's wish was to restore her health so that she and her husband could return to the mission. But they were both reluctantly compelled to abandon the expectation of safely revisiting a tropical climate. In January, 1830, Stewart was again bed-ridden. After lingering for eight months, she died, September 6, 1830, (Note: According to Hough (1875), Stewart died in January 1830.) age 32, in Cooperstown, New York. She was buried at Lakewood Cemetery in Cooperstown.
