= Cherryville, New Jersey =

Populated place in Hunterdon County, New Jersey, US

- Unincorporated community
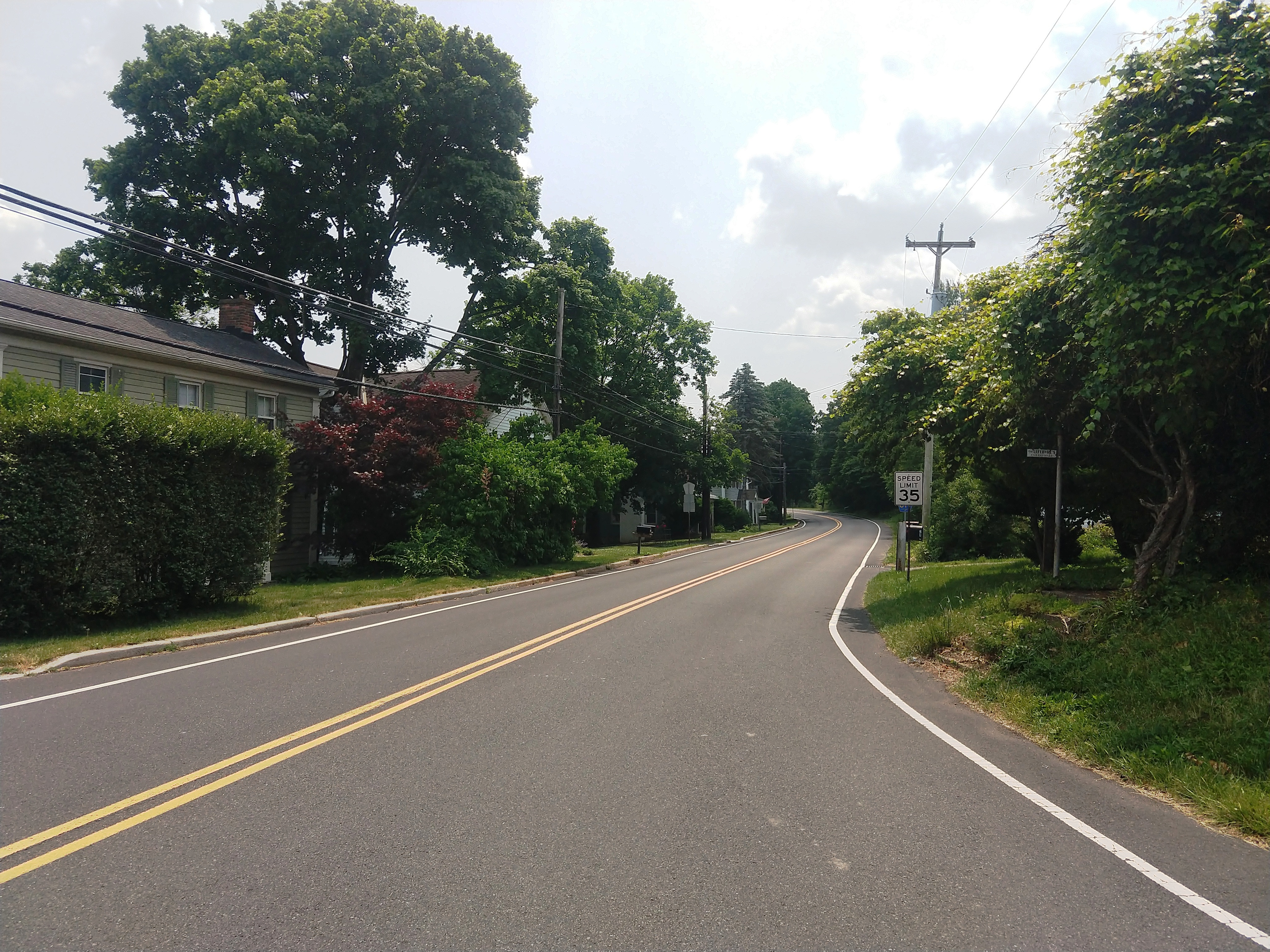
- Looking south along Cherryville Road (CR 617)

- Cherryville's location in Hunterdon County (Inset: Hunterdon County in New Jersey) Cherryville, New Jersey (New Jersey) Cherryville, New Jersey (the United States)
- Coordinates: 40°33′40″N 74°54′12″W
- Country: United States
- State: New Jersey
- County: Hunterdon
- Township: Franklin
- Elevation: 679 ft (207 m)
- GNIS feature ID: 875399

Cherryville is an unincorporated community located within Franklin Township, in Hunterdon County, in the U.S. state of New Jersey.

== History ==
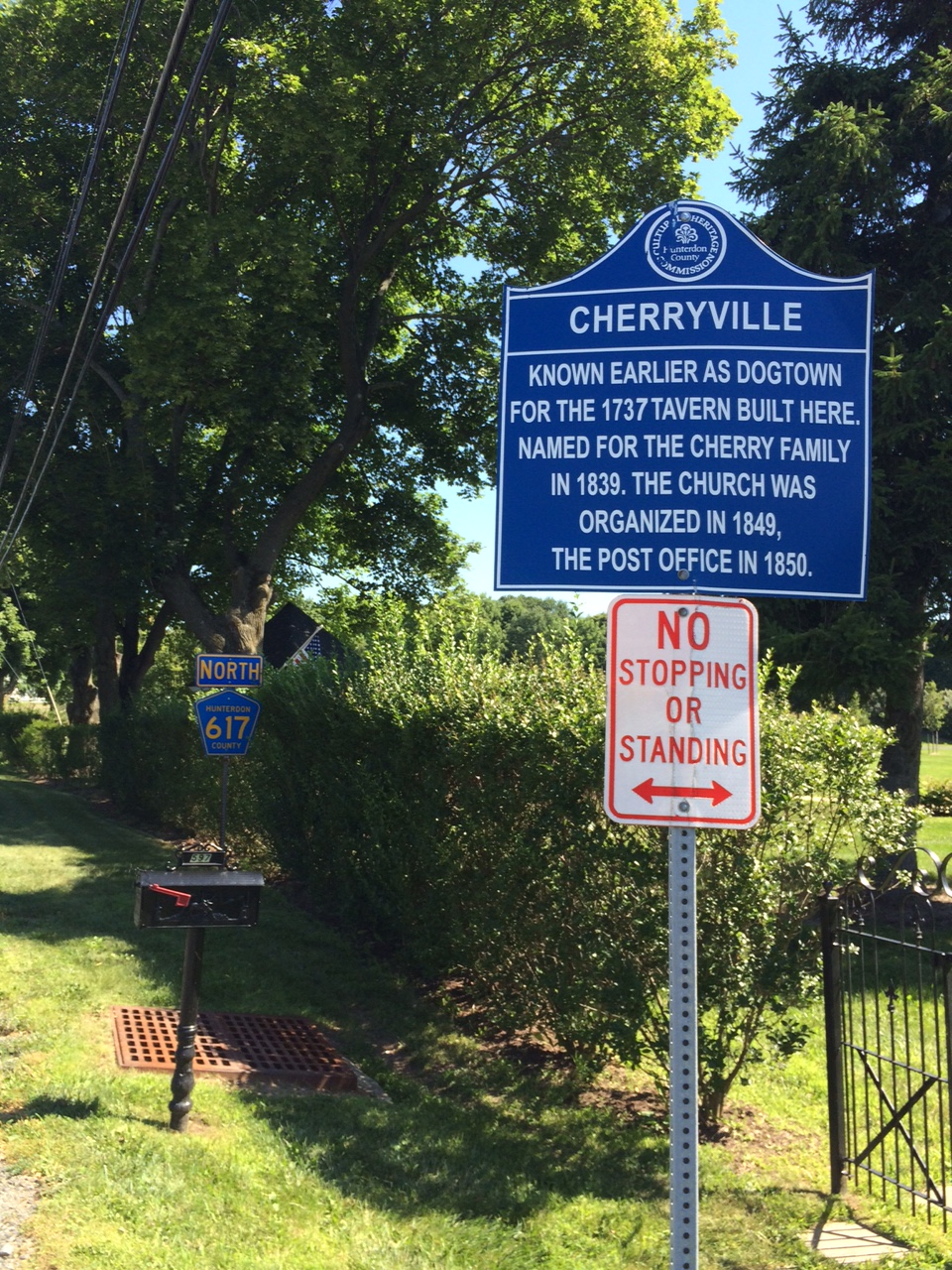
Historical marker for the community

A tavern was built in Cherryville in 1736.

Around 1830, a stone schoolhouse was erected. It was replaced by a wood-frame school in 1860.

A Baptist church was founded in Cherryville in 1849.

By 1882, Cherryville had a post office, and was described as being in "a superior farming district". It had a population of 65.
