= List of cemeteries in New Jersey =

The following list of New Jersey cemeteries lists cemeteries in the U.S. state of New Jersey. The cemeteries are grouped by county.

== Atlantic County ==
- Atlantic City Cemetery, Pleasantville
- Atlantic County Veterans Cemetery, Estell Manor
- Friendship Church Cemetery, Buena
- Holy Cross Cemetery and Chapel Mausoleum, Mays Landing
- Lincoln Memorial Park, Mays Landing
- Laurel Memorial Park and Crematory, Pomona
- Head Of The River Cemetery, 600 NJ Route-49, Estell Manor

== Bergen County ==
- Americus Cemetery, Saddle Brook
- B'Nai Israel Cemetery, Saddle Brook
- Brookside Cemetery, Englewood
- Cedar Park and Beth El Cemetery, Emerson
- Cemetery of the Madonna, Leonia
- Christ the King Cemetery, Franklin Lakes
- Edgewater Cemetery (also known as Vreeland Cemetery), Edgewater
- Fairview Cemetery, Fairview
- French Burial Ground, Hackensack
- First Reformed Dutch Church, Hackensack
- George Washington Memorial Park (Paramus, New Jersey)
- Gethsemane Cemetery, Little Ferry
- Hackensack Cemetery, Hackensack
- Hillside Cemetery, Lyndhurst
- Holy Cross Cemetery, North Arlington
- Lodi Burial Grounds, Hackensack
- Maple Grove Park Cemetery, Hackensack
- Maryrest Cemetery & Mausoleum (Mahwah, New Jersey)
- Mount Carmel Cemetery, Tenafly
- Mount Moriah Cemetery, Fairview
- Mountain Cemetery, Ramsey
- North Arlington Jewish Cemetery
- Old Hook Cemetery (now Westwood Cemetery), Westwood
- Pascack Cemetery, Park Ridge
- Riverside Cemetery, Saddle Brook
- Saint Andrews Cemetery, Hackensack
- Saint Francis de Sales Cemetery, Lodi
- Saint Joseph Cemetery, Hackensack
- Saint Joseph's Cemetery, Lyndhurst
- Saint Luke's Cemetery, Park Ridge
- Saint Mary's Cemetery, Hackensack
- SS Peter and Paul Cemetery, Hackensack
- Valleau Cemetery, Ridgewood
- Westwood Cemetery, Hackensack
- Woodside Cemetery, Dumont
- Woodside Cemetery, Hackensack
- Wyckoff Reformed Church Cemetery, Wyckoff

== Burlington County ==
- Arney's Mount Friends Meetinghouse and Burial Ground, Springfield Township
- Beverly National Cemetery, Beverly
- Coopertown Meeting House Cemetery
- Lakeview Memorial Park, Cinnaminson Township
- Mount Holly Cemetery, Mount Holly
- Mount Moriah Cemetery, Hainesport Township
- Miller Cemetery, New Gretna
- Old Upper Springfield Friends Burying Ground, Springfield Township and Wrightstown
- St. Mary's Episcopal Church, Burlington, New Jersey
- St. Peter's Cemetery, Jesus the Good Shepherd Parish, Riverside
- Brigadier General William C. Doyle Memorial Cemetery

== Camden County ==
- Arlington Cemetery, Pennsauken
- Calvary Cemetery and Mausoleum, Cherry Hill Township, New Jersey
- Colestown Cemetery, Cherry Hill Township
- Harleigh Cemetery, Camden and Collingswood
- Locustwood Memorial Park, Cherry Hill Township

== Cape May County ==
- Cape May County Veterans Memorial Park and Cemetery, 129 Crest Haven Road, Cape May Court House
- Cold Spring Presbyterian Cemetery, 780 Seashore Road, Cold Spring
- Seaside Cemetery Co, 559 Route US 9 S, Marmora

== Cumberland County ==
- Old Broad Street Presbyterian Church Cemetery, Bridgeton
- Siloam Cemetery, Vineland
- Mount Pleasant Cemetery, Millville
- Greenwood Memorial Park, Millville
- Holy Cross Cemetery, Millville
- Sacred Heart Cemetery, Vineland
- Cumberland County Veterans Cemetery, Hopewell Township

== Essex County ==
- Bloomfield Cemetery, Bloomfield
- Christ Church Cemetery & Mausoleum, Belleville
- Clinton Cemetery
- Fairmount Cemetery, Newark
- Franklin Reformed Church Cemetery, Nutley
- Glendale Cemetery, Bloomfield
- Holy Sepulchre Cemetery, East Orange
- St. Mary's Cemetery, East Orange
- Immaculate Conception Cemetery, Montclair
- Mount Hebron Cemetery, Montclair
- Mount Olivet Cemetery, Newark
- Mount Pleasant Cemetery, Newark
- Old First Presbyterian Church (Newark, New Jersey)
- Rosedale Cemetery, Orange
- Saint Stephen's Cemetery & The Chapel at Short Hills, Short Hills
- St. Johns Catholic Cemetery, Orange
- Woodland Cemetery, Newark, New Jersey
- Brookdale Reformed Church, Bloomfield.
- Belleville Reformed Church (now under a new name), Belleville.

== Gloucester County ==
- Eglington Cemetery, Clarksboro
- Trinity Church (Swedesboro, New Jersey)

== Hunterdon County ==
- Allerton Methodist Cemetery, Annandale
- Amwell Ridge Cemetery, Ringoes
- Baptistown Cemetery, Baptistown
- Barber Burying Ground, Sandy Ridge
- Bethlehem Cemetery, Union Township (Grandin)
- Bethlehem Baptist Cemetery, Pattenburg
- Bethlehem Presbyterian Churchyard, Union Township (Grandin)
- Bloomsbury Methodist Churchyard, Bloomsbury
- Bloomsbury Presbyterian Churchyard, Bloomsbury
- Central Baptist Church Cemetery, Hampton
- Cherryville Mountainview Cemetery, Flemington
- Clinton Baptist Church Cemetery, Clinton
- Clinton Presbyterian Churchyard, Clinton
- Clover Hill Reformed Church Cemetery, Clover Hill
- Cokesbury Presbyterian Church Cemetery, Cokesbury
- Cokesbury United Methodist Church Cemetery, Cokesbury
- Evergreen Cemetery, Clinton
- Everittstown Methodist Cemetery, Everittstown
- Fairmount Cemetery, Fairmount
- Fairmount Presbyterian Cemetery, Fairmount
- Fairmount Methodist Churchyard, Fairmount
- First Presbyterian Church Cemetery, Lambertville
- Flemington Baptist Churchyard, Flemington
- Flemington Jewish Community Cemetery, Flemington
- Flemington Presbyterian Church Cemetery, Flemington
- Fountain Grove Cemetery, Glen Gardner
- Frenchtown Cemetery, Frenchtown
- Friends Cemetery, Pittstown
- Holcombe Riverview Cemetery, Lambertville
- Holland Presbyterian Church Cemetery, Holland
- Immaculate Conception Cemetery and Mausoleum, Annandale
- Locktown Christian Cemetery, Locktown
- Locust Grove Cemetery, Quakertown
- Lower Amwell Cemetery – New Yard, Sergeantsville
- Lower Amwell Cemetery – Old Yard, Sergeantsville
- Lower Valley Union Cemetery, Califon
- Memorial Park Cemetery, Whitehouse
- Methodist Episcopal Church Cemetery, Kingwood
- Milford Christian Churchyard, Milford
- Milford Union Cemetery, Milford
- Mount Hope Cemetery, Lambertville
- Mount Pleasant Cemetery, Mount Pleasant
- Mountain View Cemetery, Cokesbury
- Musconetcong Valley Cemetery, Hampton
- New Germantown Cemetery, Oldwick
- New Lebanon Reformed Church Cemetery, Lebanon
- Newell Cemetery, Stanton
- Nixon Cemetery, Quakertown
- Norton Cemetery, Norton
- Norton Methodist Episcopal Cemetery, Norton
- Oak Summit Cemetery, Kingwood
- Old Lebanon Reformed Church Cemetery, Lebanon
- Old Saint Mary Cemetery, Clinton
- Old School Baptist Cemetery, Locktown
- Oldwick Methodist Cemetery, Oldwick
- Pattenburg United Methodist Church Cemetery, Pattenburg
- Philhower Family Burying Ground, Lebanon
- Pleasant Ridge Cemetery, Ringoes
- Prallsville Cemetery, Stockton
- Prospect Hill Cemetery, Flemington
- Readington Reformed Church Cemetery, Readington
- Riverside Cemetery, Clinton
- Rocks Methodist Episcopal Cemetery, Mount Airy
- Rosemont Cemetery, Rosemont
- Rural Hill Cemetery, Whitehouse
- Saint Ann’s Catholic Church Cemetery, Hampton
- Saint John the Evangelist Cemetery, Lambertville
- Saint Magdalen Cemetery, Flemington
- Saint Thomas Episcopal Church Cemetery, Pittstown
- Sand Brook German Baptist Church Cemetery, Sand Brook
- Sandy Ridge Cemetery, Sandy Ridge
- Second English Presbyterian Church Cemetery, Mount Airy
- Sergeantsville Methodist Episcopal Church Cemetery, Sergeantsville
- Slacktown Cemetery, Kingwood
- Spruce Run Cemetery, Spruce Run
- Stout-Manners Cemetery, Ringoes
- Three Bridges Reformed Church Cemetery, Three Bridges
- Union Cemetery, Grandin
- Union Cemetery, Lebanon
- Union Cemetery, Ringoes
- United Methodist Cemetery, Whitehouse
- Wertsville Baptist Churchyard, Ringoes
- Woodschurch Cemetery, Readington
- Zion Lutheran Church Cemetery, Oldwick

== Mercer County ==
- Ewing Church Cemetery & Mausoleum, Ewing
- Friends Burying Ground, Trenton
- Greenwood Cemetery, Hamilton Township
- Groveville Methodist Church Cemetery, Groveville, Hamilton Township
- Old School Baptist Cemetery, Hopewell
- Cemeteries in Robbinsville, NJ Princeton
- Princeton Cemetery, Princeton
- Riverview Cemetery, Trenton
- Saint Mary's Cemetery, Trenton
- Stony Brook Meeting House and Cemetery, Princeton

== Middlesex County ==
- Alpine Cemetery, Perth Amboy
- Chestnut Hill Cemetery, Old Bridge, East Brunswick
- Christ Church Cemetery, South Amboy
- Christ Church, New Brunswick, New Jersey
- Elm Ridge Cemetery, North Brunswick
- Elmwood Cemetery, North Brunswick
- First Presbyterian Churchyard, New Brunswick
- First Presbyterian Church and Cemetery, Woodbridge,
- First Reformed Church Cemetery, New Brunswick
- Floral Park Cemetery, South Brunswick
- Frost Woods Memorial Park, East Brunswick
- Harris Hebrew Cemetery, New Market Road, South Plainfield
- Holy Cross Burial Park, South Brunswick
- Holy Redeemer Cemetery, 1734 Clinton Avenue, South Plainfield
- Lake Nelson Memorial Park, Randolphville Road, Piscataway
- Liberty Grove Memorial Mausoleum & Crematory, Old Bridge
- Mary Ellis Burial Site, New Brunswick
- Mount Lebanon Memorial Park, Iselin
- Resurrection Cemetery, Hoes Lane, Piscataway
- Sacred Heart Cemetery, Parlin, New Jersey
- St. Peter's Cemetery, New Brunswick
- Seventh Day Baptist Cemetery, Stelton Road, Piscataway
- Stelton Baptist Church, Edison
- Three Mile Run Cemetery, New Brunswick
- Trinity Episcopal Church, Woodbridge
- Van Liew Cemetery, North Brunswick
- Willow Grove Cemetery, New Brunswick

== Monmouth County ==
- Presbyterian Cemetery, Allentown
- Shoreland Memorial Gardens, Hazlet
- Aumack Family Burying Ground, Hazlet
- Maplewood Cemetery, Freehold Township
- Locust Grove Cemetery, Eatontown
- Glenwood Cemetery, West Long Branch
- Green Grove Cemetery, Keyport
- Holmdel Cemetery & Mausoleum, Holmdel
- Woodbine Cemetery, Oceanport
- St. John's Cemetery, Allentown
- Monmouth Memorial Park Cemetery, Tinton Falls
- Cream Ridge Cemetery, Upper Freehold
- Emley Hill Cemetery, Emleys Hill
- St. Rose of Lima, Freehold
- Old Scots Burying Ground, Marlboro Township
- Old Tennent Cemetery, Manalapan Township
- Farmingdale Evergreen Cemetery, Farmingdale
- Adelphia Cemetery, Adelphia
- Cedar Lawn Cemetery, Howell
- St. Vladimir's Russian Orthodox Cemetery, Jackson
- Ardena Baptist Church Cemetery, Ardena
- St. Anne's Cemetery, Wall Township
- Atlantic Cemetery, Colts Neck
- Atlantic View Cemetery & Mausoleum, Manasquan
- St. Catharine's Cemetery, Sea Girt
- St. Gabriel's Cemetery, Marlboro
- White Ridge Cemetery, Eatontown
- Yellow Meeting House Cemetery, Red Valley

== Morris County ==
- Beth Israel Memorial Park, Cedar Knolls
- Chester Cemetery, Chester
- Evergreen Cemetery, Morristown
- Fair Mount Cemetery, Chatham
- First Presbyterian Cemetery, Rockaway
- Gate of Heaven Cemetery, East Hanover
- German Valley Rural Cemetery, Long Valley
- Greenwood Cemetery, Boonton
- Heavenly Rest Memorial Park, East Hanover
- Hilltop Presbyterian Cemetery, Mendham
- Mount Holiness Memorial Park, Butler
- Orchard Street Cemetery, Dover
- Our Lady of the Mountain Cemetery, Schooley's Mountain
- Pleasant Hill Cemetery, Chester
- Presbyterian Church Cemetery, Morristown
- Restland Memorial Park, East Hanover
- Rev. John Hancock House, Cider Mill and Cemetery - Florham Park NPS gallery
- St. Joseph's Catholic Church , Mendham
- St. Mary's Cemetery, Mine Hill Township
- St. Vincent Cemetery, Madison
- Union Cemetery, Washington Township

== Ocean County ==
- Miller Cemetery, New Gretna
- Zion United Methodist Cemetery, Plumsted
- White Cedars Memorial Park, Stafford
- Whiting Memorial Park & Mausoleum, Whiting

== Passaic County ==
- Cedar Lawn Cemetery, Paterson
- Immaculate Conception Cemetery, Clifton
- King Solomon Memorial Park, Clifton
- Laurel Grove Memorial Park, Totowa

== Salem County ==
- Finn's Point National Cemetery, Salem
- St. John's Episcopal Cemetery, Salem

== Somerset County ==
- Abraham Stryker Burying Ground, Skillman
- Adamsville Cemetery (see Mountain Top Cemetery, below)
- Basking Ridge Cemetery, Basking Ridge
- Bedminster Reformed Church Cemetery, Bedminster
- Beekman Cemetery, Rocky Hill
- Bernardsville Methodist Cemetery, Bernardsville
- Bishop Janes Cemetery, Bernardsville
- Blau-Nevius Burying Ground, Skillman
- Blawenburg Reformed Church Cemetery, Blawenburg
- Bolmer Family Burying Ground, Martinsville
- Bound Brook Mountain Avenue Cemetery, Bound Brook
- Brokaw-Polhameus Family Burying Ground, South Bound Brook
- Brook Avenue Presbyterian Cemetery, North Plainfield
- Castner-Compton Cemetery, Martinsville
- Cedar Grove Cemetery, Franklin Township
- Cedar Hill Cemetery, East Millstone
- Clover Hill Reformed Church Cemetery, Hillsborough
- Coddington-Van Tuyl Cemetery, Warren
- Covenhoven Family Burying Ground, Franklin Township
- Davis Burial Ground, Zarephath
- Dumont Burying Ground, Hillsborough Township
- Dutchtown Cemetery (see Unionville Cemetery, below)
- Early Settlers Burial Ground, Somerville
- Eldert Smith-Bennett Burial Ground, Franklin Township
- Evergreen Cemetery, Basking Ridge
- First Reformed Dutch Church, Somerville
- Fisher Family Graveyard, South Bound Brook
- Flagtown Cemetery, Raritan
- Gladstone Methodist Cemetery (see Peapack Union Cemetery, below)
- Grand View Cemetery (see Mountain Top Cemetery, below)
- Griggstown Cemetery, Franklin Township
- Hall Cemetery, Neshanic Station
- Harlingen Reform Cemetery, Rocky Hill
- Hill Cemetery, Monmouth Junction
- Hillsborough Reformed Church and Millstone Cemetery, Hillsborough
- Hoagland Cemetery, Raritan
- Hofheimer Cemetery, Plainfield
- Holy Cross Cemetery, Basking Ridge
- Holy Ghost Carpatho-Russian Orthodox Cemetery, Manville
- Immaculate Conception Cemetery, Somerville
- Jerolaman Cemetery, Peapack-Gladstone
- Kingston Presbyterian Church Cemetery, Kingston
- Lamington Black Cemetery, an African American cemetery
- Lamington Presbyterian Church Cemetery
- Liberty Corner Presbyterian Church Cemetery, Liberty Corner
- Mill Lane Cemetery, Flagtown
- Millington Baptist Church Cemetery, Millington
- Mount Bethel Cemetery, Warren
- Mount Horeb United Methodist Cemetery, Warren
- Mountain Top Cemetery, Somerville
- Neshanic Cemetery, Neshanic
- New Somerville Cemetery, Somerville
- North Branch Reformed Church Cemetery, North Branch
- North Plainfield Township Burying Ground (see Brook Avenue Presbyterian Cemetery, above)
- Old Dutch Parsonage Burial Ground, Somerville
- Old Presbyterian Graveyard, Bound Brook
- Old Raritan Cemetery (see Old Somerville Cemetery, below)
- Old Somerville Cemetery, Somerville
- Oppie Burying Ground, Rocky Hill
- Peapack Reform Cemetery, Peapack
- Peapack Union Cemetery, Gladstone
- Pleasant Plains Cemetery, Franklin Township
- Pluckemin Cemetery, Pluckemin
- Pluckemin Presbyterian Church New Cemetery, Pluckemin
- Pottersville Reform Cemetery, Pottersville
- Prince Rogers Cemetery, Martinsville
- Raritan Cemetery, Somerville
- Rocky Hill Cemetery, Rocky Hill
- Sacred Ground Upper Cemetery, Skillman
- Sacred Ground Lower Cemetery, Skillman
- Sacred Heart Cemetery, Manville
- Saint Andrew Ukrainian Orthodox Cemetery, South Bound Brook
- Saint Bernard's Cemetery, Bernardsville
- Saint Joseph Cemetery, Bound Brook
- Saint Mary's Cemetery, Watchung
- Saints Peter and Paul Cemetery, Hillsborough
- Saums Burying Ground, Hillsborough
- Shalom Cemetery
- Skillman-Beekman Cemetery (see Beekman Cemetery, above)
- Smalley Farm Burial Ground (see Symen Van Wickle Cemetery, below)
- Somerset Hills Memorial Park, Basking Ridge
- Somerville Cemetery, Somerville
- Somerville New Cemetery, Somerville
- Somerville Old Cemetery, Somerville
- South Branch Reformed Church Cemetery, South Branch
- South Middlebush Cemetery, Franklin Township
- Springdale United Methodist Church Cemetery, Warren
- Stout-Shepherd Burial Ground, Stoutsburg
- Swan Cemetery, North Branch
- Symen Van Wickle Cemetery, Somerset
- Temple Shalom Cemetery, Chimney Rock
- Ten Mile Run Cemetery, Little Rocky Hill, Franklin Township
- Trinity United Church Cemetery, Warren
- Tucker Family Burying Ground, Warren
- Tunison Burial Ground (see Early Settlers Burial Ground, above)
- Tunison Cemetery, Somerville
- Unionville Cemetery, Montgomery
- Van Nest – Weston Burying Ground, Hillsborough
- Van Pelt Burial Ground, North Branch
- Van Vegthen-Davis Cemetery, Finderne
- Vanderveer Cemetery #01, North Branch
- Vanderveer Cemetery #02, North Branch
- Veghte Burying Ground, Raritan
- Vermeule Family Burial Ground, North Plainfield
- Voorhees-Nevius Burying Ground, Franklin Township

== Sussex County ==
- Deckertown-Union Cemetery, Wantage
- Harmony Hill Methodist Church Cemetery, Stillwater
- Lafayette Cemetery, Lafayette
- Newton Cemetery, Newton
- North Church Cemetery, Hardyston Township
- Stillwater Cemetery, Stillwater

== Union County ==
- Evergreen Cemetery, Hillside
- Fairview Cemetery (Westfield, New Jersey)
- French-Richards Cemetery (Springfield, New Jersey) (40.6827888144643, -74.31718794108211)
- Hillside Cemetery, Scotch Plains
- Hollywood Memorial Park and Cemetery, Union
- St. John's Episcopal Churchyard, Elizabeth
- Gods Acre Cemetery, Scotch Plains Presbyterian Church, Scotch Plains
- Rahway Cemetery
- Rosedale Cemetery, Linden
- Rosehill Cemetery and Crematory, Linden
- First Presbyterian Churchyard, Elizabeth

== Warren County ==
- Belvidere Cemetery, Belvidere
- Cedar Ridge Cemetery, Blairstown
- Greenwich Presbyterian Church Cemetery, Greenwich Township
- The Olde Presbyterian Burial Ground, Hackettstown
