= Edgewater Cemetery =

Cemetery in Bergen County, New Jersey, US

- Interactive map of Edgewater Cemetery

Details
- Established: 18th century
- Location: 684 River Road; Edgewater, New Jersey
- Country: United States
- Coordinates: 40.819641°N 73.979453°W
- Size: 1.6 acres (6,500 m^{2})
- Find a Grave: Edgewater Cemetery

The Edgewater Cemetery (also known as Vreeland Cemetery) is a cemetery in the Bergen County, New Jersey community of Edgewater.

== Site ==
The 1.6-acre cemetery has its entrance on River Road near the Hudson River and the Hudson River Waterfront Walkway. It is nestled between private residences and buildings that were once part of the Alcoa Edgewater Works, an Alcoa aluminum processing plant, at the foot of the Hudson Palisades.

== Burials ==
The cemetery was created by the Vreeland family and was initially a private burial ground. It holds the graves of local heroes from the American Revolutionary War through Spanish–American War. Two slaves also are buried there, as is Go-Won-Go Mohawk, an Indian princess and actress who married a former Indian fighter and settled in Edgewater, where she died in 1924. The last burial in took place in 1982.

== See also ==
- Gethsemane Cemetery
- Fort Lee Historic Park
- Burdett's Landing
- English Neighborhood
- Bergen County Cemeteries
- List of cemeteries in Hudson County, New Jersey
