= JVI =

JVI may refer to:

- Central Jersey Regional Airport, in Somerset County, New Jersey, United States
- Journal of Value Inquiry
- Journal of Virology
- Jack Van Impe
