= Sandy Ridge =

Sandy Ridge or Sandyridge may refer to:

- Sandyridge Care Home, UK, site of child abuse scandal
- Sandy Ridge, Hong Kong
- Sandy Ridge, New Jersey
- Sandy Ridge (Virginia) in the United States
  - The Sandy Ridge Tunnel on the CSX Kingsport Subdivision
- Sandy Ridge, North Carolina
