= Alcoa Edgewater Works =

Former building in New Jersey, US

- U.S. National Register of Historic Places
- New Jersey Register of Historic Places
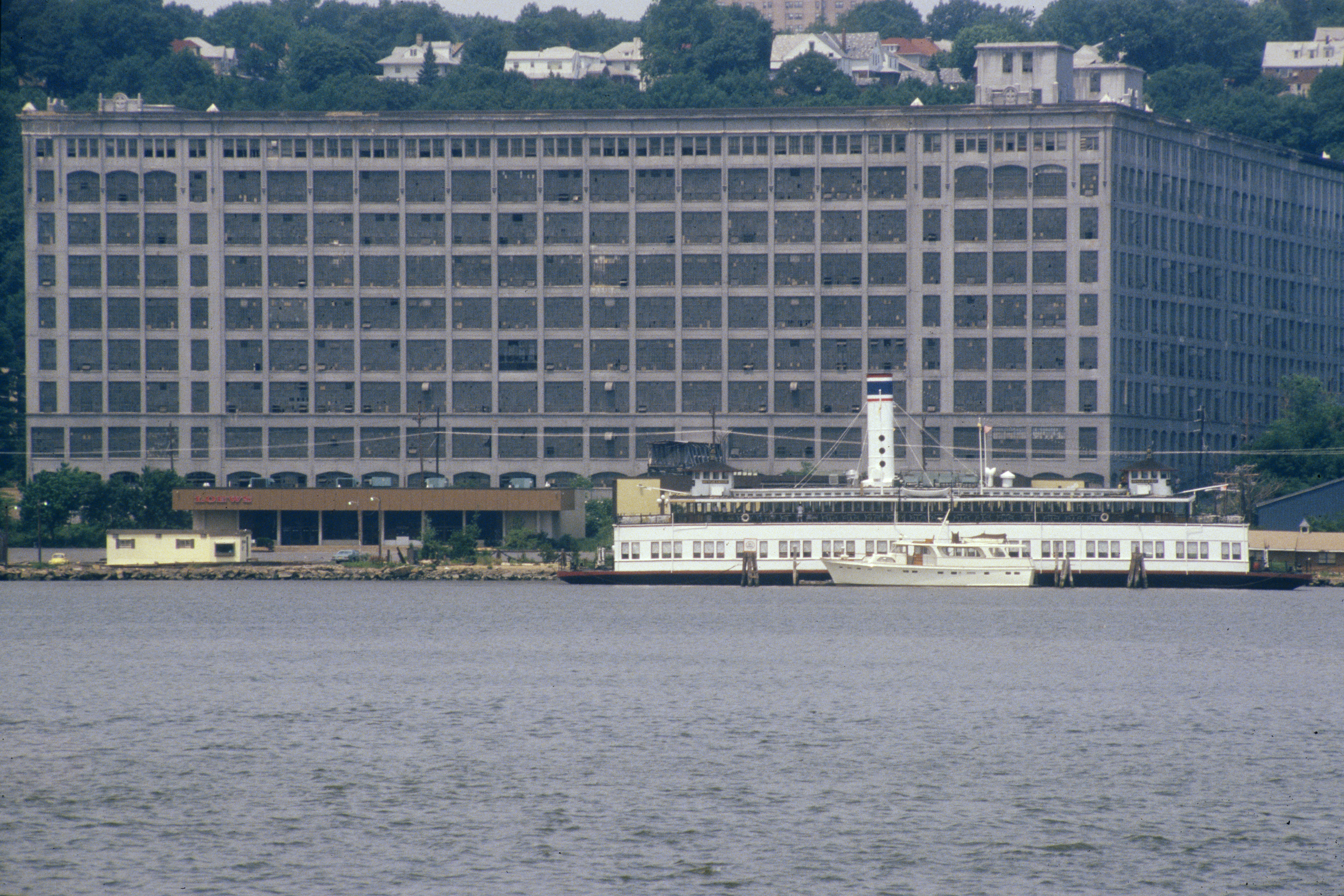
- Primary structure of the Alcoa Works in 1984

- Location within Bergen County, New Jersey Location within New Jersey Location within the United States
- Location: 700 River Road, Edgewater, New Jersey
- Coordinates: 40°49′12″N 73°58′46″W
- Area: 9 acres (3.6 ha)
- Built: 1916
- Architects: Fickes, Edwin Stanton; Turner Construction Company
- Demolished: 1998 (rolling mill in 2013)
- NRHP reference No.: 78001735
- NJRHP No.: 463

Significant dates
- Added to NRHP: August 10, 1978
- Designated NJRHP: April 6, 1978

The Alcoa Edgewater Works was located in Edgewater, Bergen County, New Jersey, United States. The building was built in 1916 for the Alcoa company and added to the National Register of Historic Places on August 10, 1978. The building has since been demolished.

== See also ==
- Edgewater Cemetery
- National Register of Historic Places listings in Bergen County, New Jersey
