= Sand Brook, New Jersey =

Populated place in Hunterdon County, New Jersey, US

- Unincorporated community
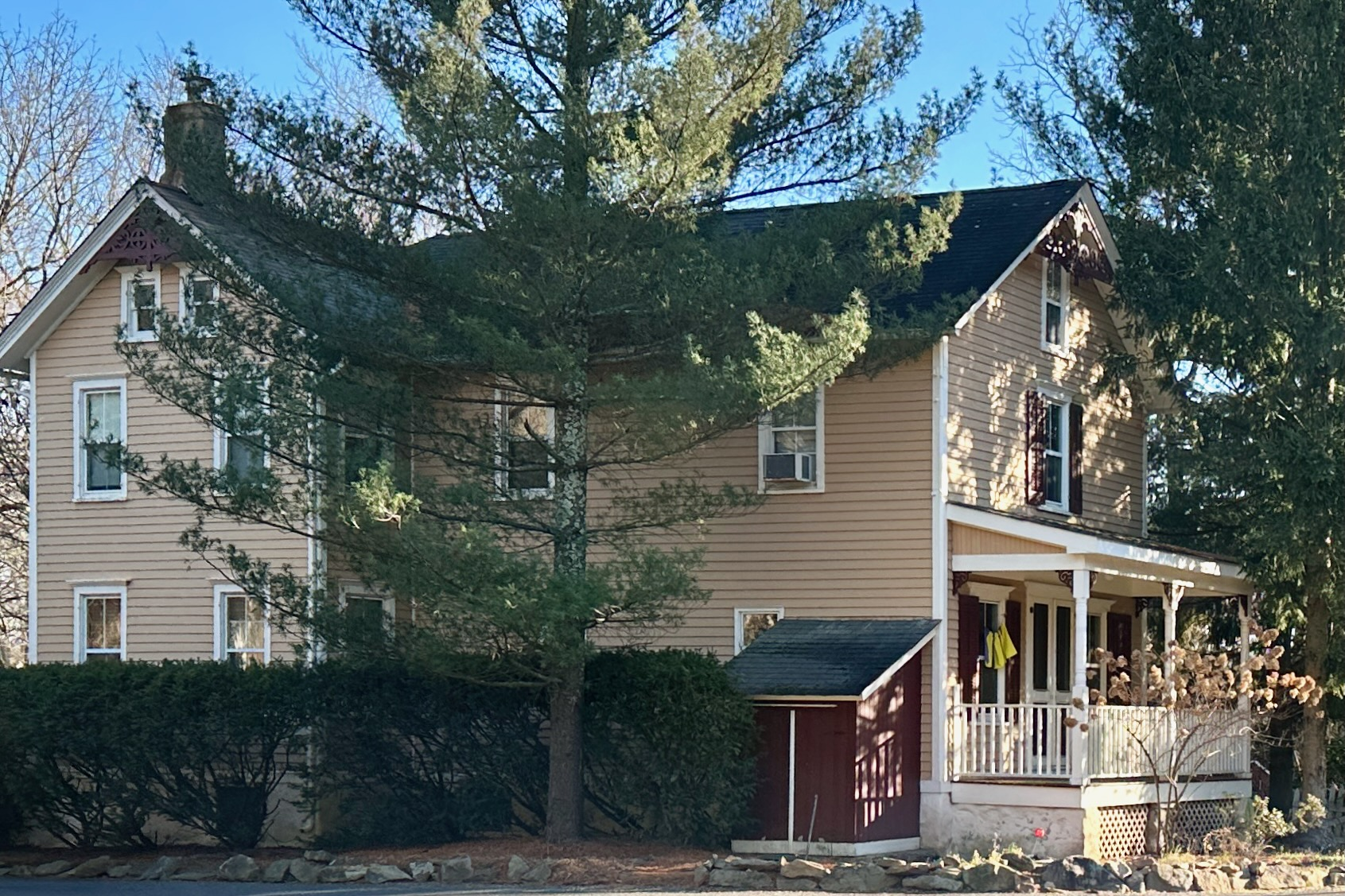
- Former Sand Brook General Store

- Location of Sand Brook in Hunterdon County Inset: Location of county within the state of New Jersey Sand Brook (New Jersey) Sand Brook (the United States)
- Coordinates: 40°28′09″N 74°55′01″W
- Country: United States
- State: New Jersey
- County: Hunterdon
- Township: Delaware
- Elevation: 318 ft (97 m)
- GNIS feature ID: 880245

Sand Brook is an unincorporated community located along County Route 523, Sand Brook-Headquarters & Britton Roads in Delaware Township in Hunterdon County, in the U.S. state of New Jersey.

== Historic district ==
- Sand Brook Historic District
- U.S. National Register of Historic Places
- U.S. Historic district
- New Jersey Register of Historic Places
- Area: 27 acres (11 ha)
- Architectural style: Greek Revival, Late Victorian
- NRHP reference No.: 13000497
- NJRHP No.: 4843

Significant dates
- Added to NRHP: July 17, 2013
- Designated NJRHP: February 21, 2013

The Sand Brook Historic District is a 27-acre (11 ha) historic district encompassing the community. It was added to the National Register of Historic Places on July 17, 2013, for its significance in architecture and community development. The district includes 16 contributing buildings, six contributing structures, and two contributing sites. It includes Greek Revival and Late Victorian architecture.

The former Sand Brook General Store was built around 1902 by Samuel F. Fauss. It is a two-story frame building featuring Queen Anne architecture. The Sand Brook German Baptist Church was built in 1848 by a group from the Amwell Church of the Brethren. It is a one-story stuccoed-stone building with Greek Revival influences. The congregation was locally known as the "Moorites", after elder John P. Moore and his family. The small stone-walled graveyard located behind the church also contributes to the district.

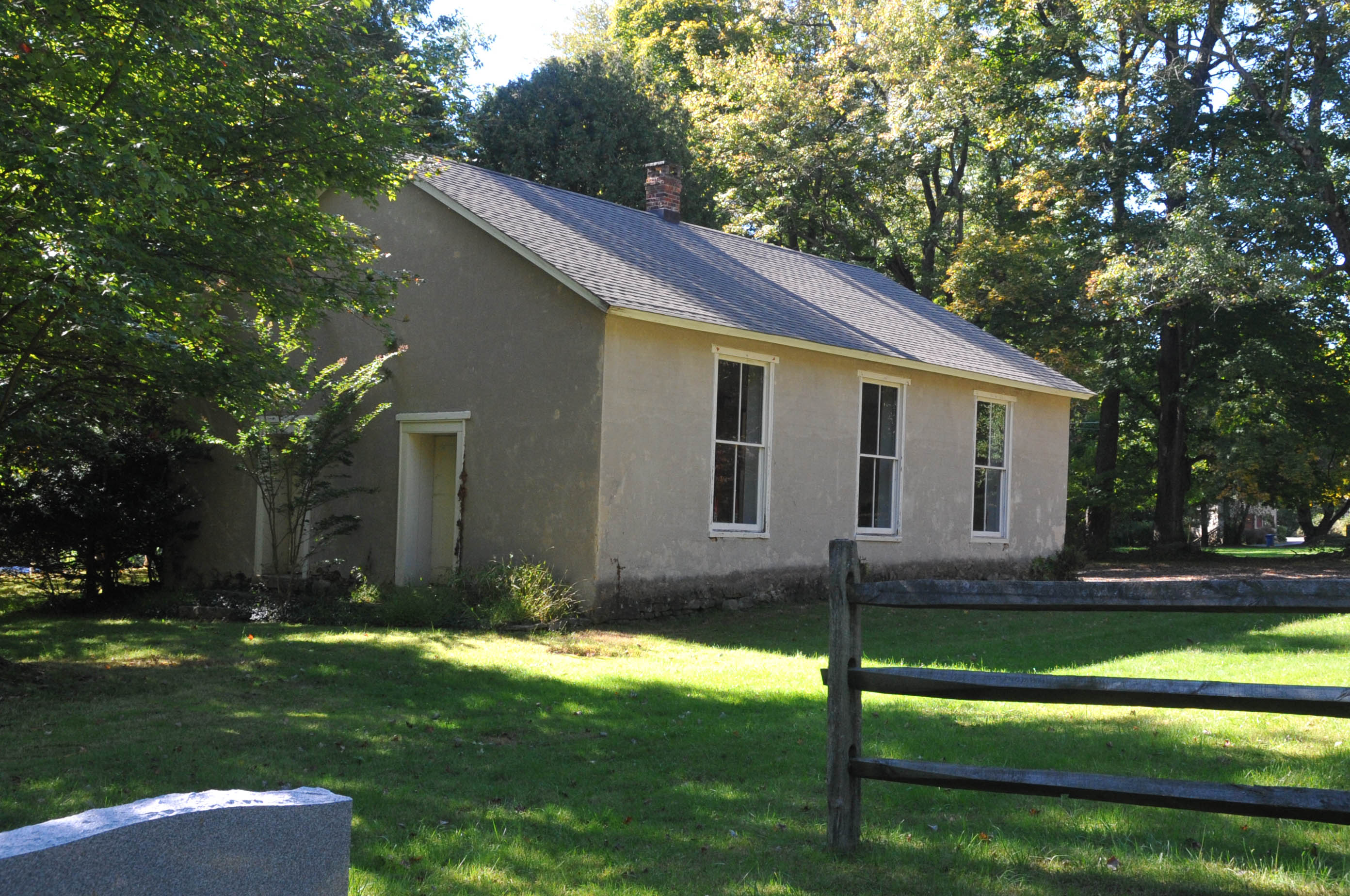
German Baptist Church

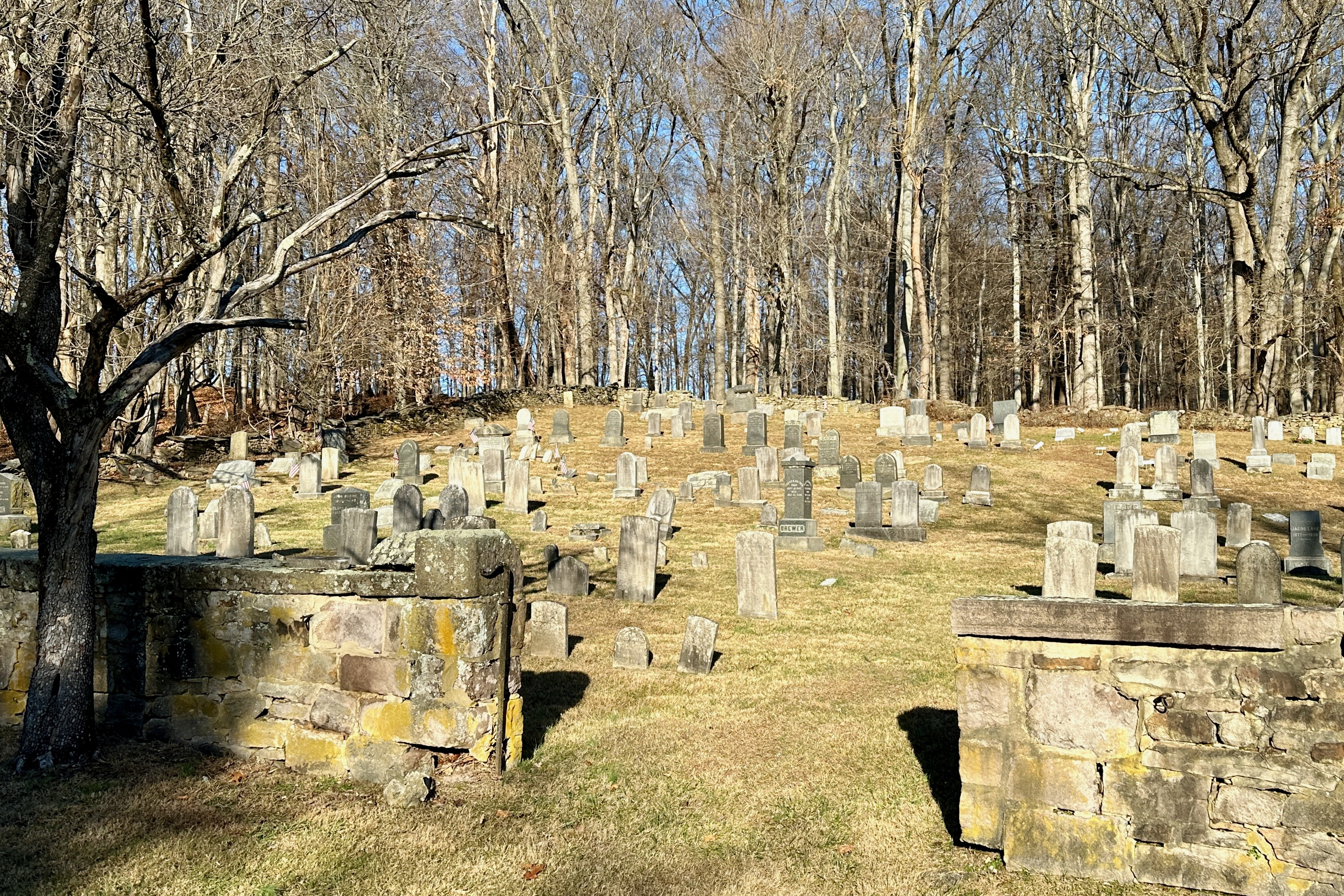
Graveyard
