= Brigadier General William C. Doyle Memorial Cemetery =

Veteran's cemetery in New Jersey

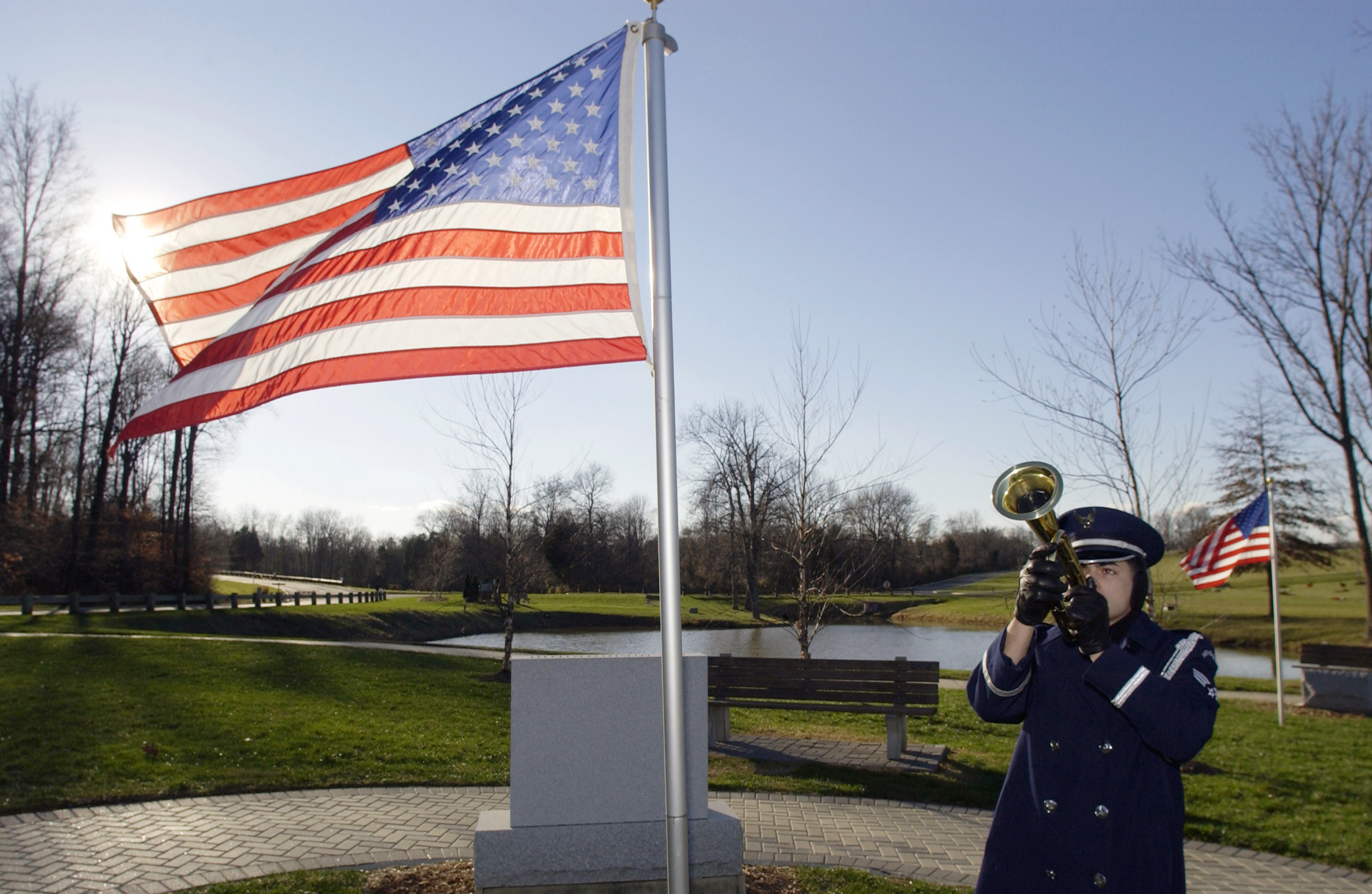
- Military funeral training at the cemetery
- Interactive maps of the cemetery

Details
- Established: May 30, 1986
- Location: North Hanover Township, New Jersey
- Country: United States
- Coordinates: 40.09354°N 74.56409°W
- Type: Military veterans
- Owned by: US Department of Veterans Affairs
- Size: 225 acres (91 ha)
- Website: BG William C. Doyle Veterans Memorial Cemetery
- Find a Grave: Brigadier General William C. Doyle Memorial Cemetery

The 225-acre (91 ha) Brigadier General William C. Doyle Memorial Cemetery, spearheaded by its namesake U.S. Army Brigadier General William C. Doyle, was dedicated on May 30, 1986 by Governor Thomas Kean. It is located in the Arneytown section of North Hanover Township in Burlington County, New Jersey. Burials are open to military families living within a 75-mile (121 km) radius of the cemetery. The United States Army Corps of Engineers oversaw the planning and outlay of the cemetery, including its non-denominational chapel. A $5,529,378 expansion grant from the National Cemetery Association, through its Veterans Cemetery Grants Program, was awarded in 2020.

The creation of the cemetery arose from a 1965 need when at that time the only two federal veterans' cemeteries in the state were full. The cemetery opened as New Jersey's first state-operated veterans' cemetery, serving as "a lasting memorial to those men and women who put their lives on the line to defend our country's honor and freedom." Among the free benefits accorded to veterans and their families is a chapel for their use, and eternal maintenance. The facility was funded jointly by the state and federal governments and is managed by the New Jersey Department of Military and Veterans Affairs.

== See also ==
- List of cemeteries in New Jersey
- Wreaths Across America
