= Cooperstown, New Jersey =

- Unincorporated community
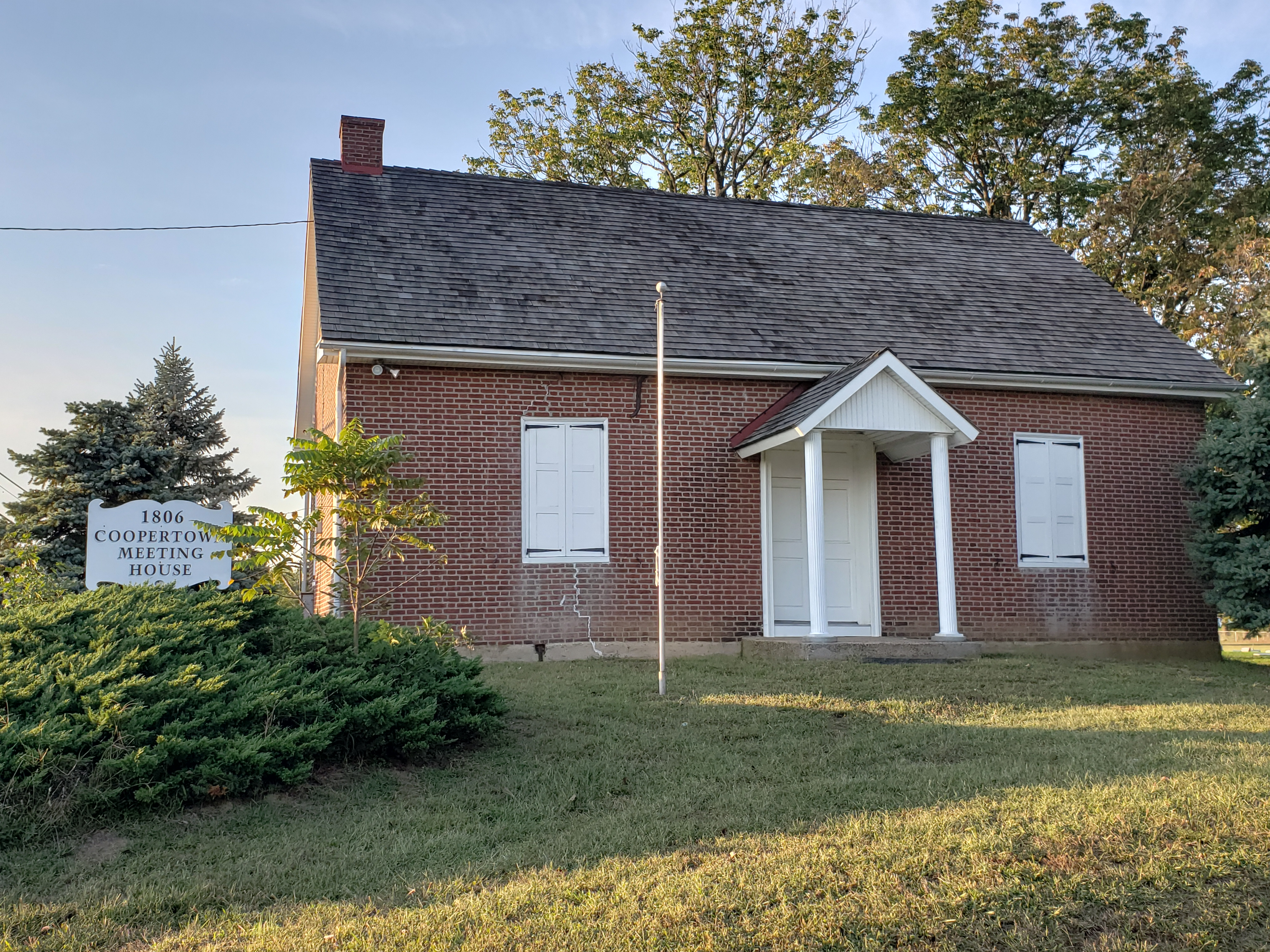
- Coopertown Meetinghouse, listed on the National Register of Historic Places

- Location of Cooperstown in Burlington County (Inset: Location of county within the state of New Jersey) Cooperstown (New Jersey) Cooperstown (the United States)
- Coordinates: 40°02′48″N 74°54′12″W
- Country: United States
- State: New Jersey
- County: Burlington
- Townships: Edgewater Park and Willingboro
- Elevation: 30 ft (9.1 m)
- Time zone: UTC-5 (Eastern (EST))
  - Summer (DST): UTC-4 (EDT)
- GNIS feature ID: 883162

Cooperstown, historically known as Coopertown, is an unincorporated community located along the border of Edgewater Park and Willingboro townships in Burlington County, New Jersey, United States. The community was named by William Cooper, the father of the author Fenimore Cooper. The Coopertown Meetinghouse was built in 1806 and added to the National Register of Historic Places in 1978.
