= Cokesbury, New Jersey =

Populated place in Hunterdon County, New Jersey, US

- Unincorporated community
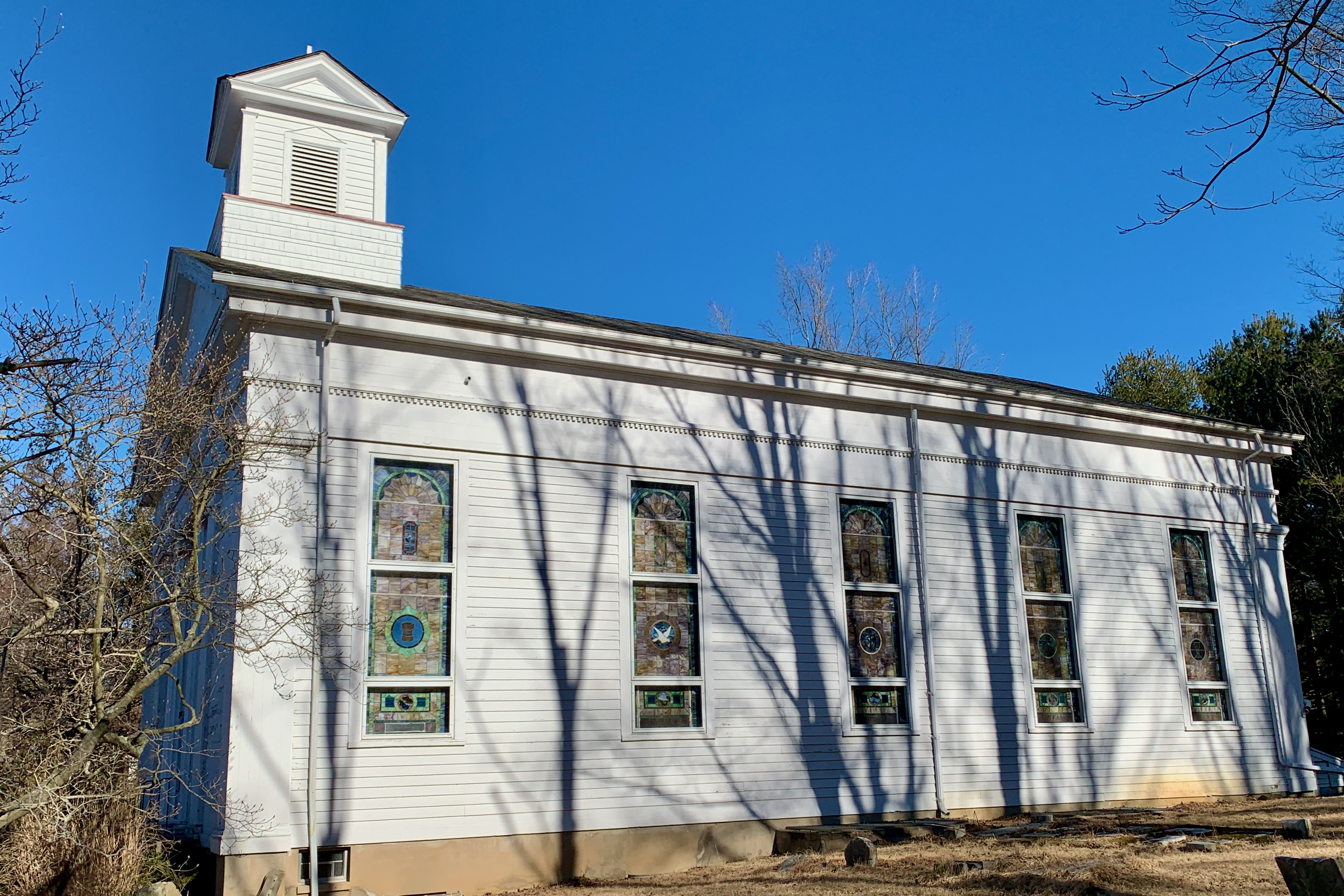
- Cokesbury United Methodist Church

- Location within Hunterdon County, New Jersey Location within New Jersey Location within the United States
- Coordinates: 40°41′00″N 74°50′11″W
- Country: United States
- State: New Jersey
- County: Hunterdon
- Township: Clinton and Tewksbury
- Established: 1754
- GNIS feature ID: 875541

Cokesbury, historically known as Cokesburg, is an unincorporated community located on the border of Clinton and Tewksbury townships in Hunterdon County, New Jersey. It was named after two Methodist bishops, Coke and Asbury. The Cokesbury Historic District was listed on the state and national registers of historic places in 1997.

== History ==
In 1754, an iron furnace was built in Cokesbury. The first known settler was Mindurt Farley. When Farley died in 1790, his farm was passed to his son Joshua. A man named Conrad Apgar built a tavern, but it was destroyed by fire in April 1812. A hotel was built by John Farley, Mindurt's other son. In 1815, the Cokesbury church was completed and the community was thriving. However, the post office constantly misspelled Cokesbury as Cokesburg. The town started to fall in the 1880s. The wheelwright shop and the hotel closed. In 1915, the post office also closed. Shrinkage continued during World War II.

== Historic district ==
- Cokesbury Historic District
- U.S. National Register of Historic Places
- U.S. Historic district
- New Jersey Register of Historic Places
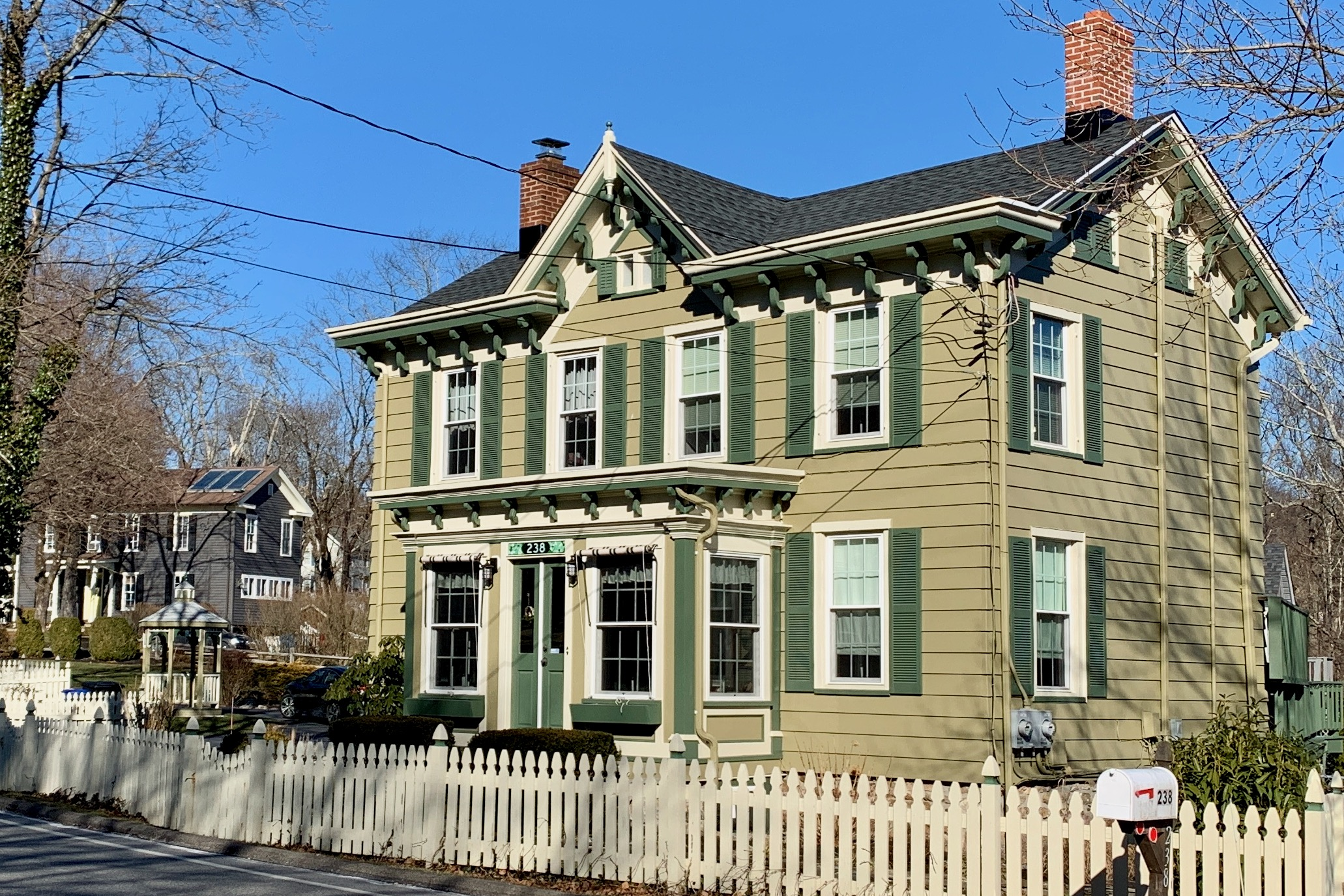
- Queen Anne style house
- Location: Cokesbury-Califon Road, CR 639, Water Street, and McCatharn Road
- Area: 50 acres (20 ha)
- Architectural style: Greek Revival, Italianate, Queen Anne
- NRHP reference No.: 97000802
- NJRHP No.: 3248

Significant dates
- Added to NRHP: July 17, 1997
- Designated NJRHP: June 3, 1997

The Cokesbury Historic District is a 50-acre (20 ha) historic district encompassing the community. It was added to the National Register of Historic Places on July 17, 1997, for its significance in architecture, commerce, religion, and community planning and development. The district includes 44 contributing buildings, three contributing structures, and two contributing sites.

The current Cokesbury United Methodist Church was built in 1851 and features Greek Revival architecture.

== Gallery ==
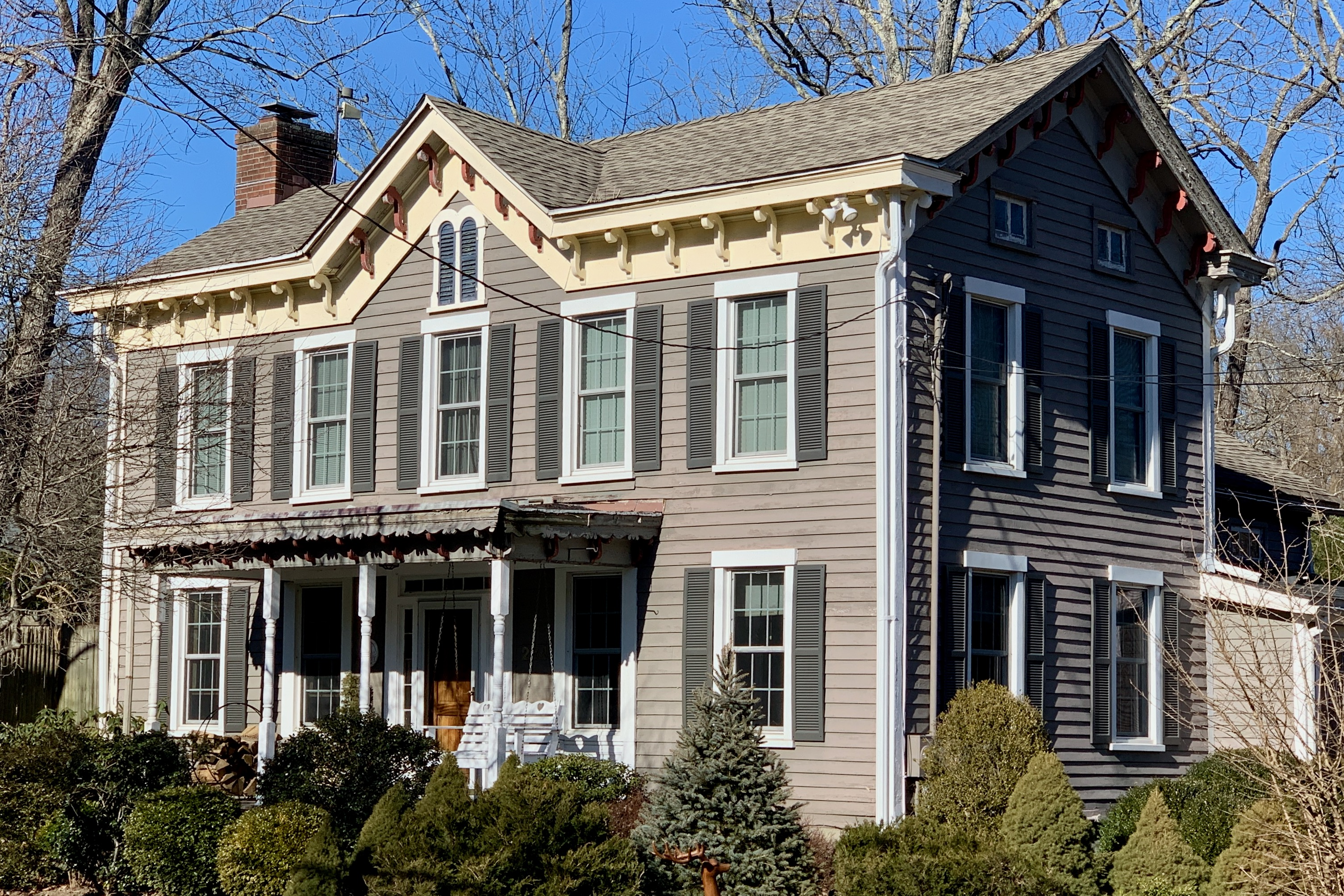
Italianate style house

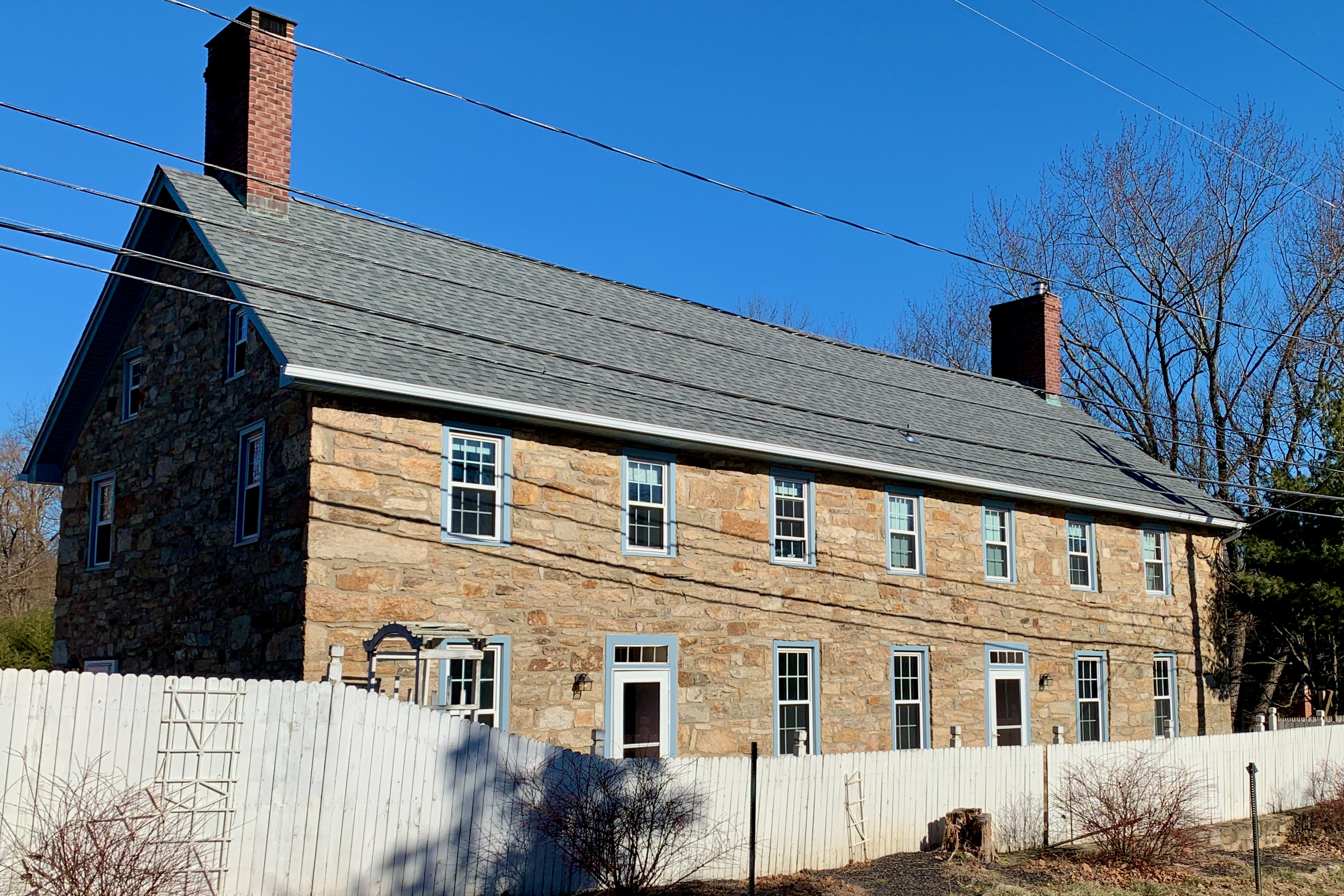
Former tavern and hotel
