= Gethsemane Cemetery =

Historic African American cemetery in Little Ferry, New Jersey

- U.S. National Register of Historic Places
- New Jersey Register of Historic Places
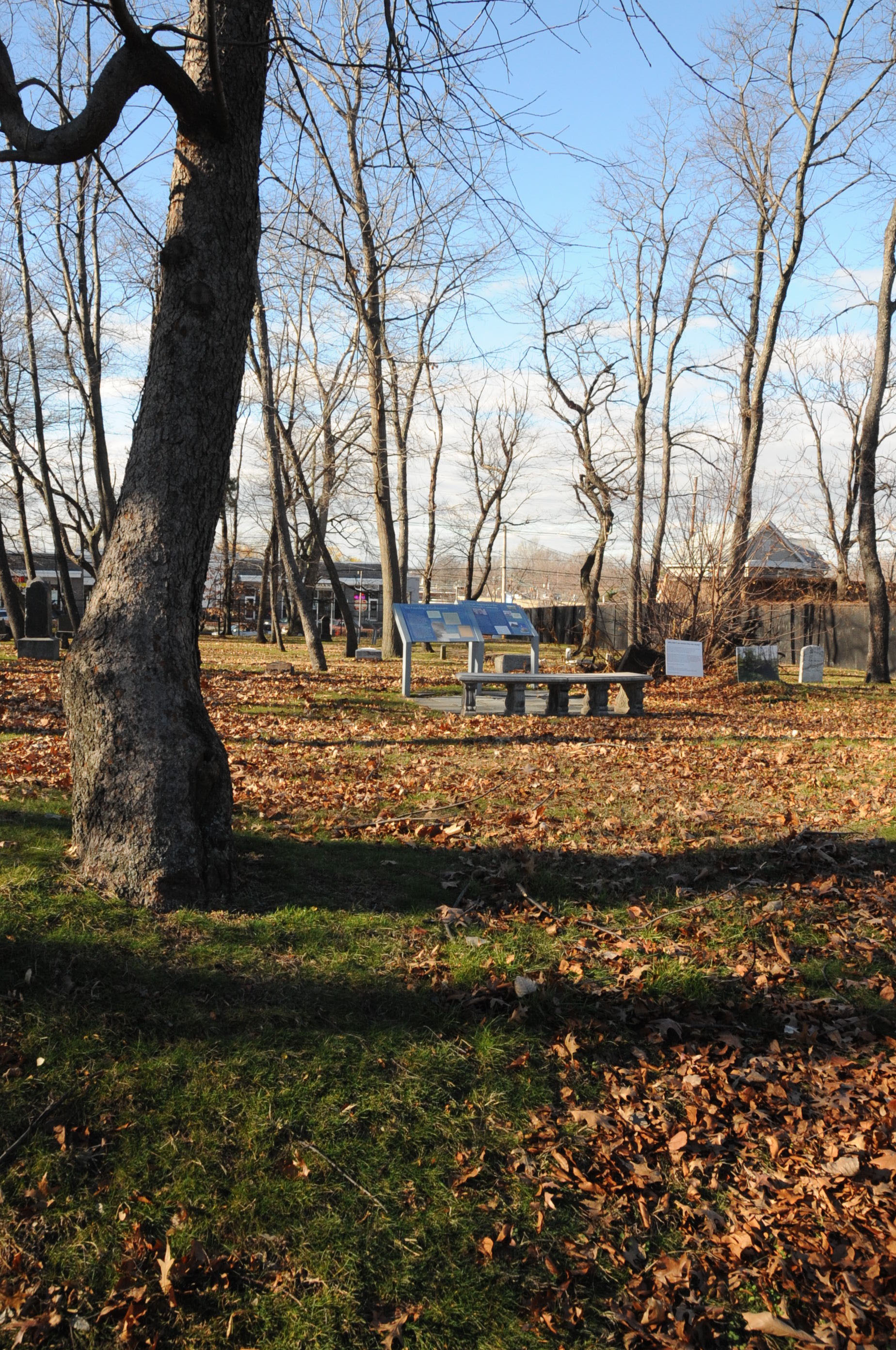

- Location within Bergen County, New Jersey Location within New Jersey Location within the United States
- Location: 360-370 Liberty Street, Little Ferry, New Jersey
- Coordinates: 40°51′20″N 74°2′29″W
- Area: less than one acre
- Built: 1860
- NRHP reference No.: 94000330
- NJRHP No.: 549

Significant dates
- Added to NRHP: April 20, 1994
- Designated NJRHP: February 24, 1994

The Gethsemane Cemetery is located in Little Ferry, Bergen County, New Jersey, United States on an acre on a sandy hill just off U.S. Route 46 and Liberty Street. The cemetery was added to the National Register of Historic Places on April 20, 1994.

== Name ==
Gethsemane (Greek ΓεΘσημανἰ, Gethsēmani Hebrew:גת שמנים, Aramaic:גת שמני, Gath-Šmânê, Assyrian ܓܕܣܡܢ, Gat Šmānê, lit. "oil press") is a garden at the foot of the Mount of Olives in Jerusalem, most famous as the place where Jesus and his disciples prayed the night before Jesus' crucifixion.

== History ==
The cemetery was opened in 1860 as a burial ground for nearby African-American residents. In 1901 the cemetery was turned over to seven African-American trustees and incorporated as Gethsemane Cemetery. Over 500 people were buried in less than an acre of land. The last burial occurred in 1924. Bergen County took over the maintenance of the cemetery in 1985 and dedicated it as a County Historic Site. Fewer than 50 gravestones remain intact.

== Notable burials ==
- Elizabeth Sutliff Dulfer, (d. 1880) – formerly enslaved, owned second largest clay company at the time.
- Peter Billings – Civil War veteran
- Silas M. Carpenter – Civil War veteran

== See also ==
- National Register of Historic Places listings in Bergen County, New Jersey
- Bergen County Cemeteries
