= Presbyterian Cemetery, Allentown, New Jersey =

Cemetery in Monmouth County, New Jersey, US

Coordinates: 40°10′27″N 74°35′10″W

Allentown Presbyterian Cemetery (also known as Presbyterian Churchyard) is a cemetery located in Allentown, in Monmouth County, New Jersey, United States.

== Noted interments ==
- James Henderson Imlay (1764–1823), a U.S. Representative from March 4, 1797 to March 3, 1801, from New Jersey's at-large congressional district (1797–99) and New Jersey's 4th congressional district (1799–1801).
- William Augustus Newell (1817–1901), physician and politician, who was a three-term member of the United States House of Representatives, served as a Republican as the 18th Governor of New Jersey, and as Governor of the Washington Territory from 1880–84.
