= Van Nest – Weston Burying Ground =

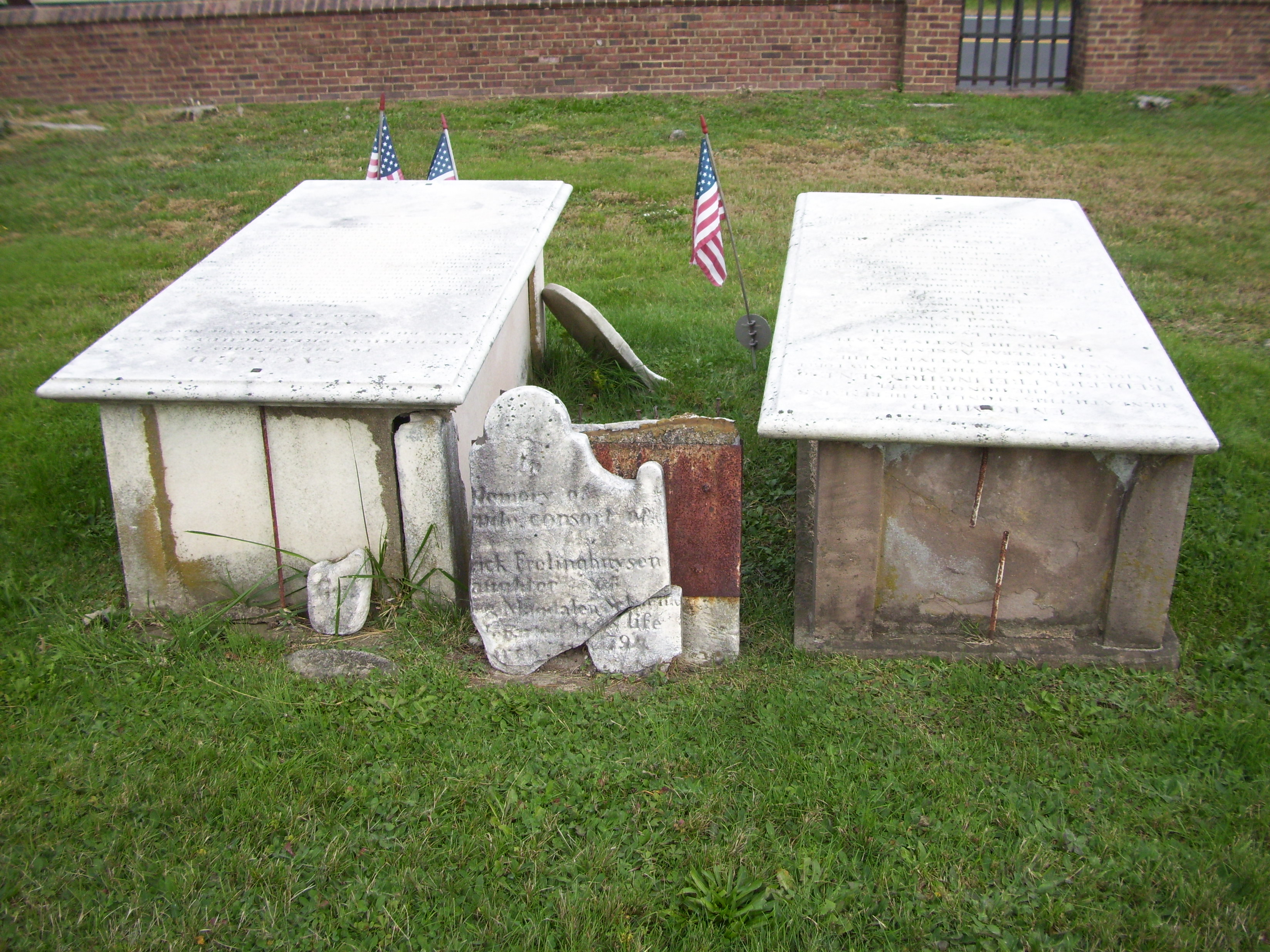
- Frederick Frelinghuysen (1753–1804) grave
- Interactive map of Van Nest – Weston Burying Ground

Details
- Established: circa 1800
- Location: Hillsborough Township, New Jersey
- Country: United States
- Coordinates: 40°31′41″N 074°35′30″W
- Size: about 1/16 acre
- No. of graves: between 20 and 30 extant stones and 42 names

The Van Nest – Weston Burying Ground is in Hillsborough Township, New Jersey on the border with Manville, New Jersey, United States. It is also referred to as the Van Nest Burying Ground and the Frelinghuysen Burying Ground. The cemetery is located on Millstone River Road (County Route 533) and the corner of Schmidt Street. It resides on the edge of Central Jersey Regional Airport. On the opposite side of the Millstone River and slightly north is the Davis Burial Ground in Zarephath, New Jersey. It has a similar brick wall surrounding the cemetery and dates from the same era. Van Nest – Weston Burying Ground was surveyed in 1912 by E. Gertrude Nevius of East Millstone and was published in the Somerset County Historical Quarterly. Between 1912 and 2008 there are 42 identifiable burials.

== Notable burials ==
- Frederick Frelinghuysen (1753–1804), was a United States Senator from New Jersey from 1793 until 1796, and served as a U.S. District Attorney for New Jersey in 1801.
- Frederick Frelinghuysen (1788–1820), was a New Jersey attorney and the son of Frederick Sr.

== Images ==
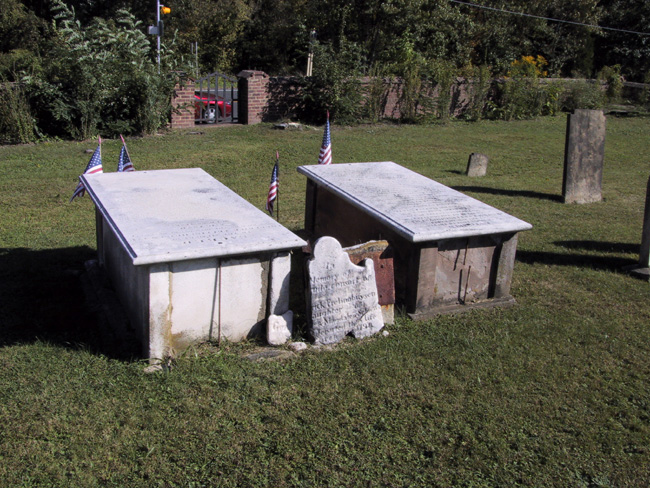
Grave of Frederick Frelinghuysen (1753–1804)

Photographed from the other side

Tombstone inscription of Frederick Frelinghuysen (1753–1804)

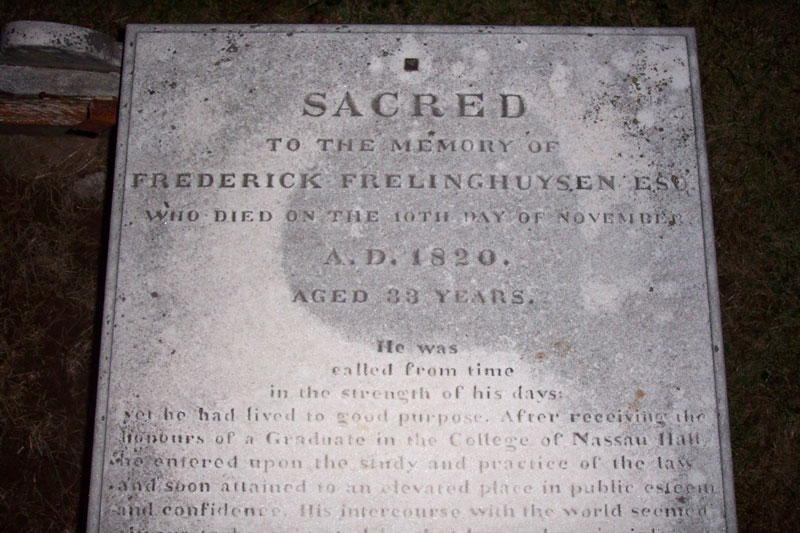
Tombstone of Frederick Frelinghuysen (1788–1820)

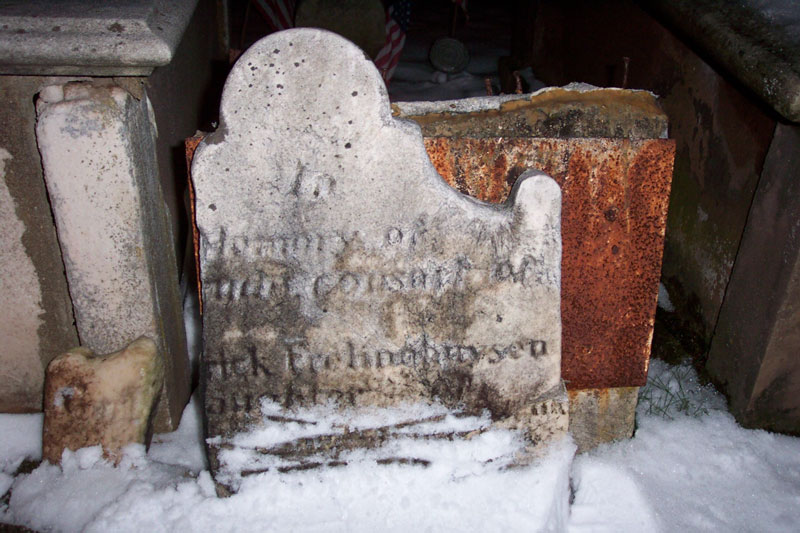
"In memory of ..., consort of [Frede]rick Frelinghuysen ... daughter of ..."
