= Mount Airy, New Jersey =

Populated place in Hunterdon County, New Jersey, US

- Unincorporated community
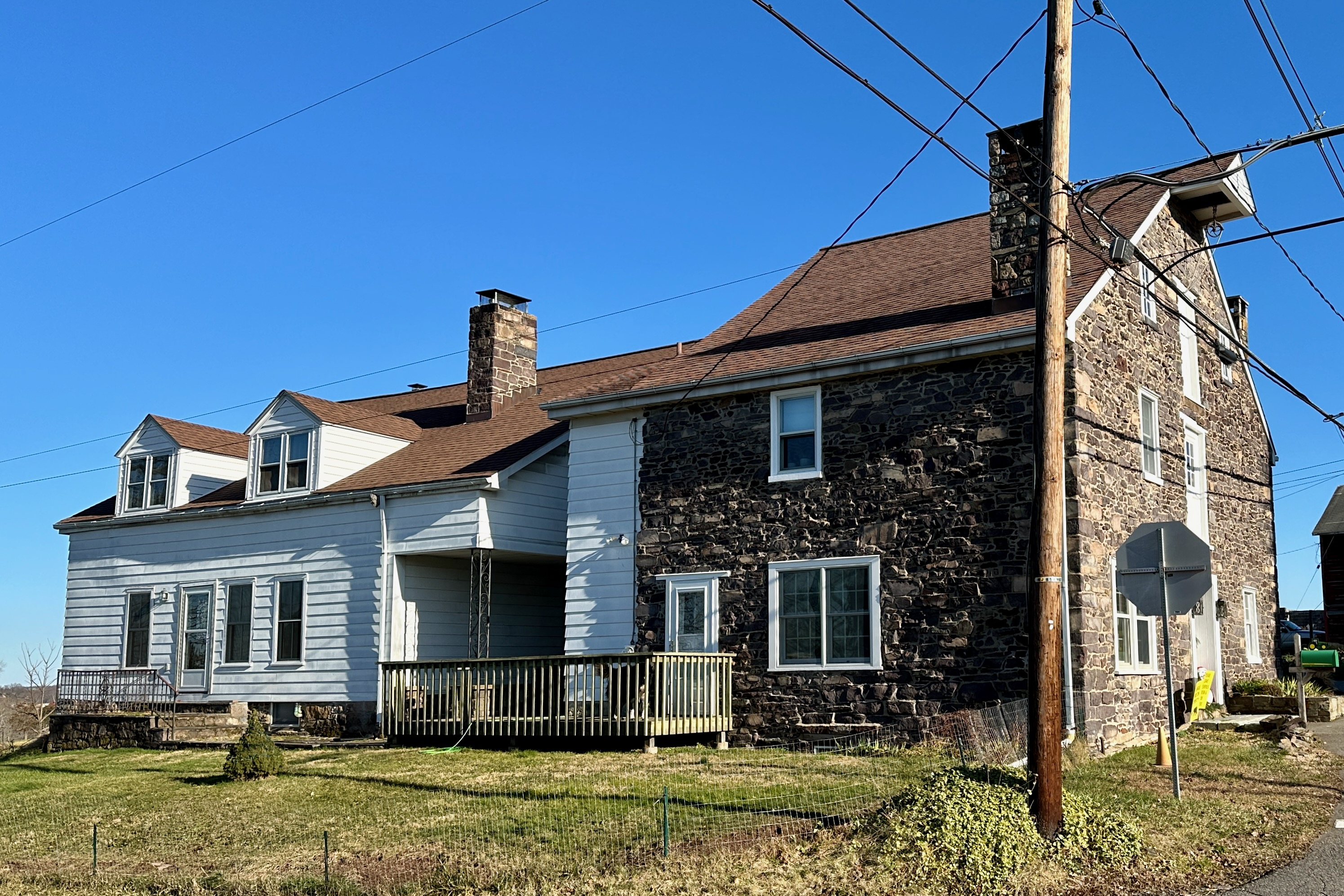
- Old Mount Airy Tavern and Holcombe's Storehouse

- Location of Mount Airy in Hunterdon County Inset: Location of county within the state of New Jersey Mount Airy (New Jersey) Mount Airy (the United States)
- Coordinates: 40°23′55″N 74°54′26″W
- Country: United States
- State: New Jersey
- County: Hunterdon
- Township: West Amwell
- Elevation: 259 ft (79 m)
- GNIS feature ID: 878514

Mount Airy is an unincorporated community located within West Amwell Township in Hunterdon County, in the U.S. state of New Jersey.

== History ==
A mill existed on the Alexauken Creek east of Mount Airy prior to the Revolution. By 1881, Mount Airy had a school, store, church, wagon and blacksmith shop, grist-mill, and about 12 dwellings. Prior to 1881 a hotel was located at the settlement.

== Historic district ==
- Mount Airy Historic District
- U.S. National Register of Historic Places
- U.S. Historic district
- New Jersey Register of Historic Places
- Area: 105 acres (42 ha)
- NRHP reference No.: 89001943
- NJRHP No.: 1641

Significant dates
- Added to NRHP: November 13, 1989
- Designated NJRHP: September 14, 1989

The Mount Airy Historic District is a 105-acre (42 ha) historic district encompassing the community. It was added to the National Register of Historic Places on November 13, 1989, for its significance in architecture, commerce, industry, and settlement. The district includes 26 contributing buildings, and two contributing sites. The Old Mount Airy Tavern was built in the late 18th century and was a stage coach stop on the Old York Road. Holcombe's Storehouse is a late 18th century two and one-half story coursed rubble stone building with overhanging hoist. Both have been converted into residences. The Gothic Revival style Second English Presbyterian Church of Amwell, also known as the Mount Airy Presbyterian Church, was built in 1874. The church was founded in 1754. The cemetery was started in the mid 18th century.

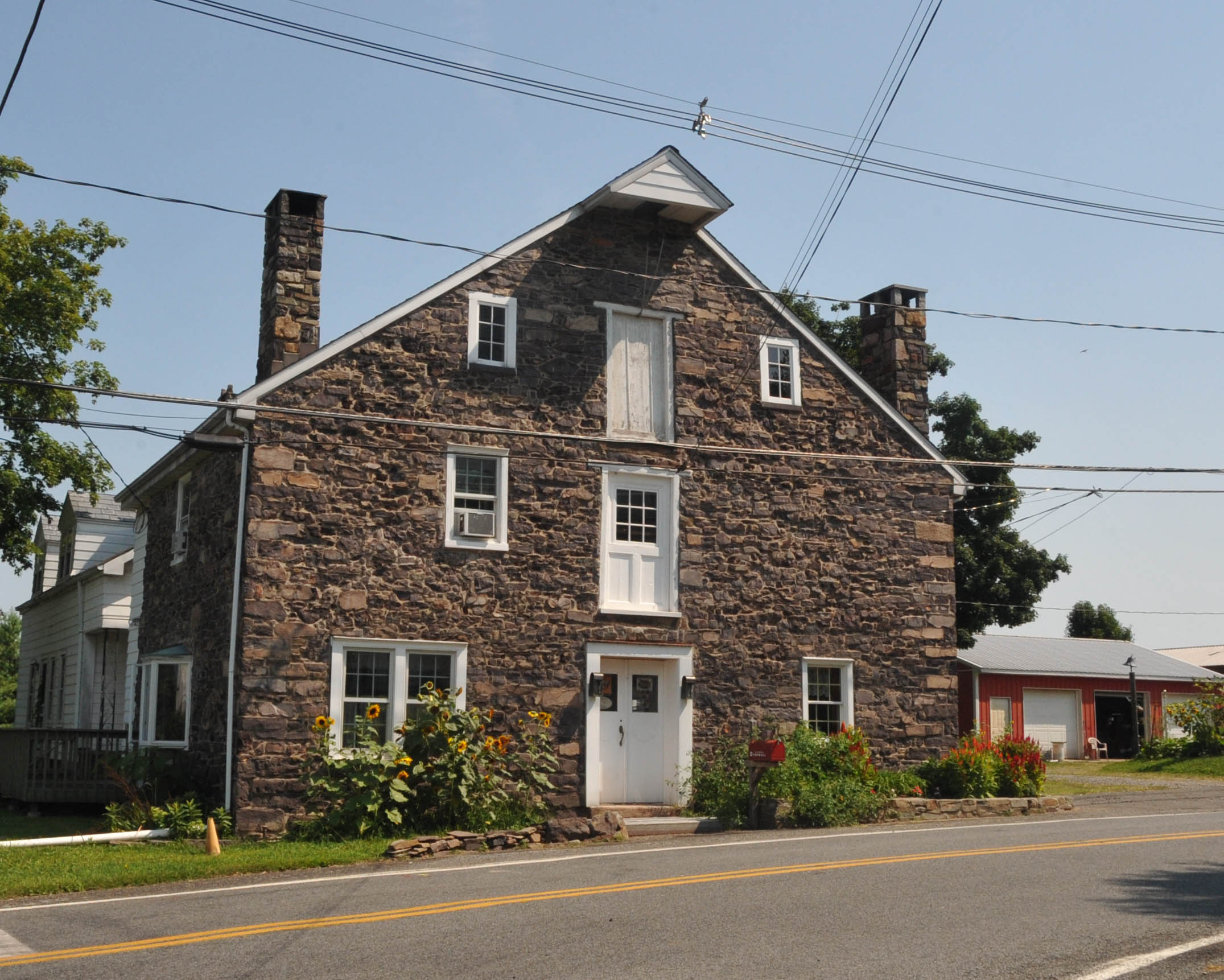
Holcombe's Storehouse

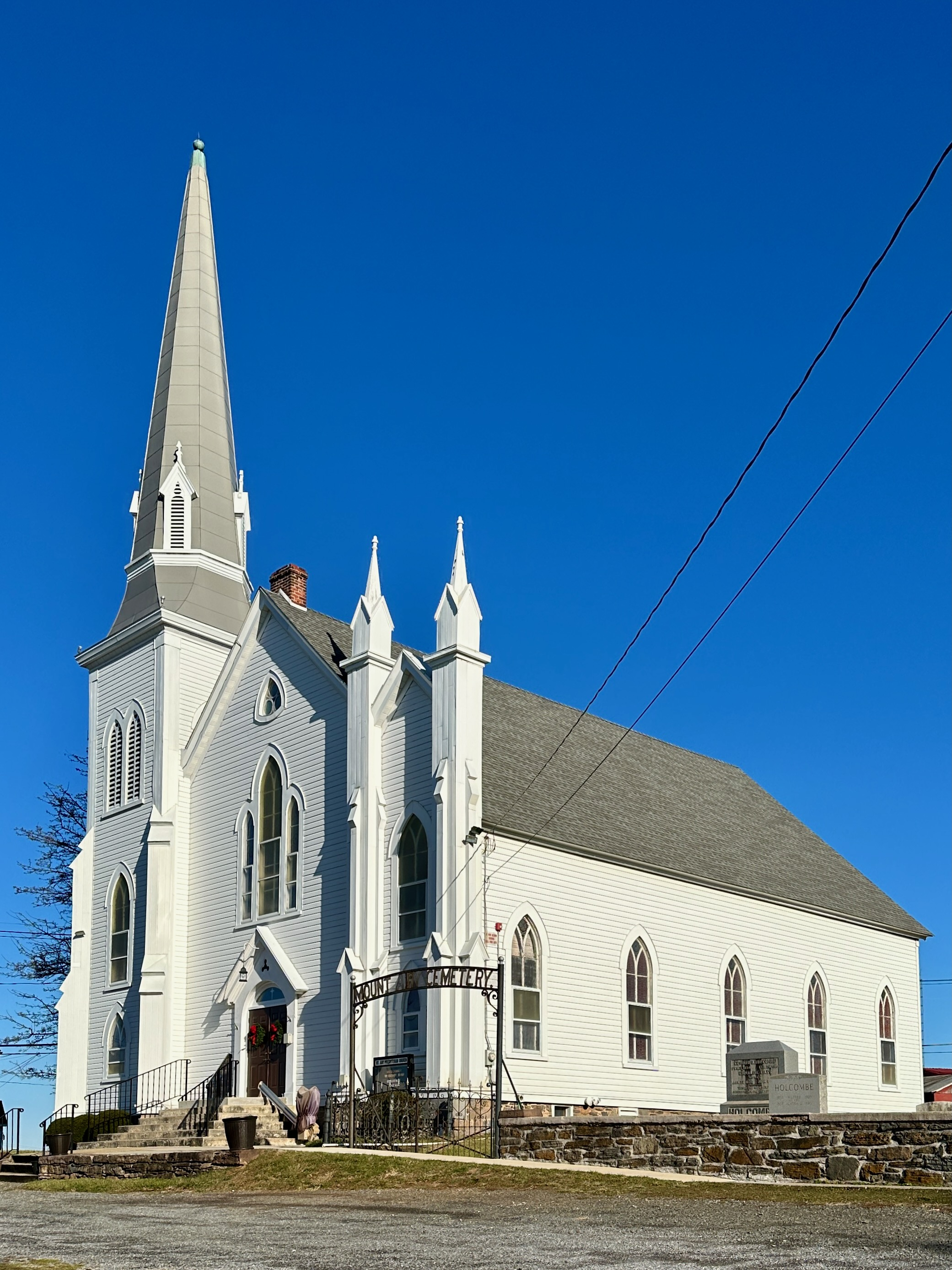
Mount Airy Presbyterian Church

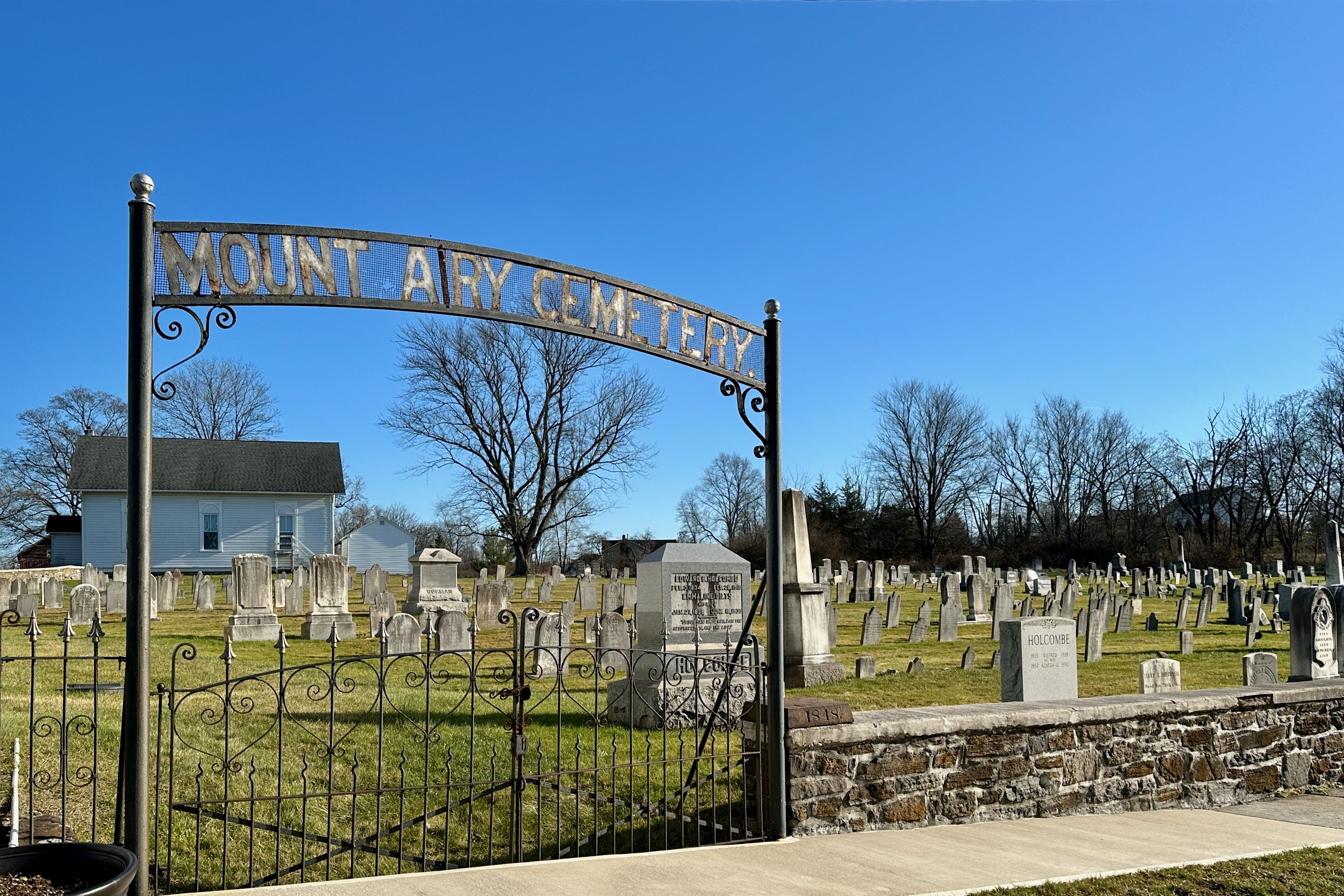
Mount Airy Cemetery

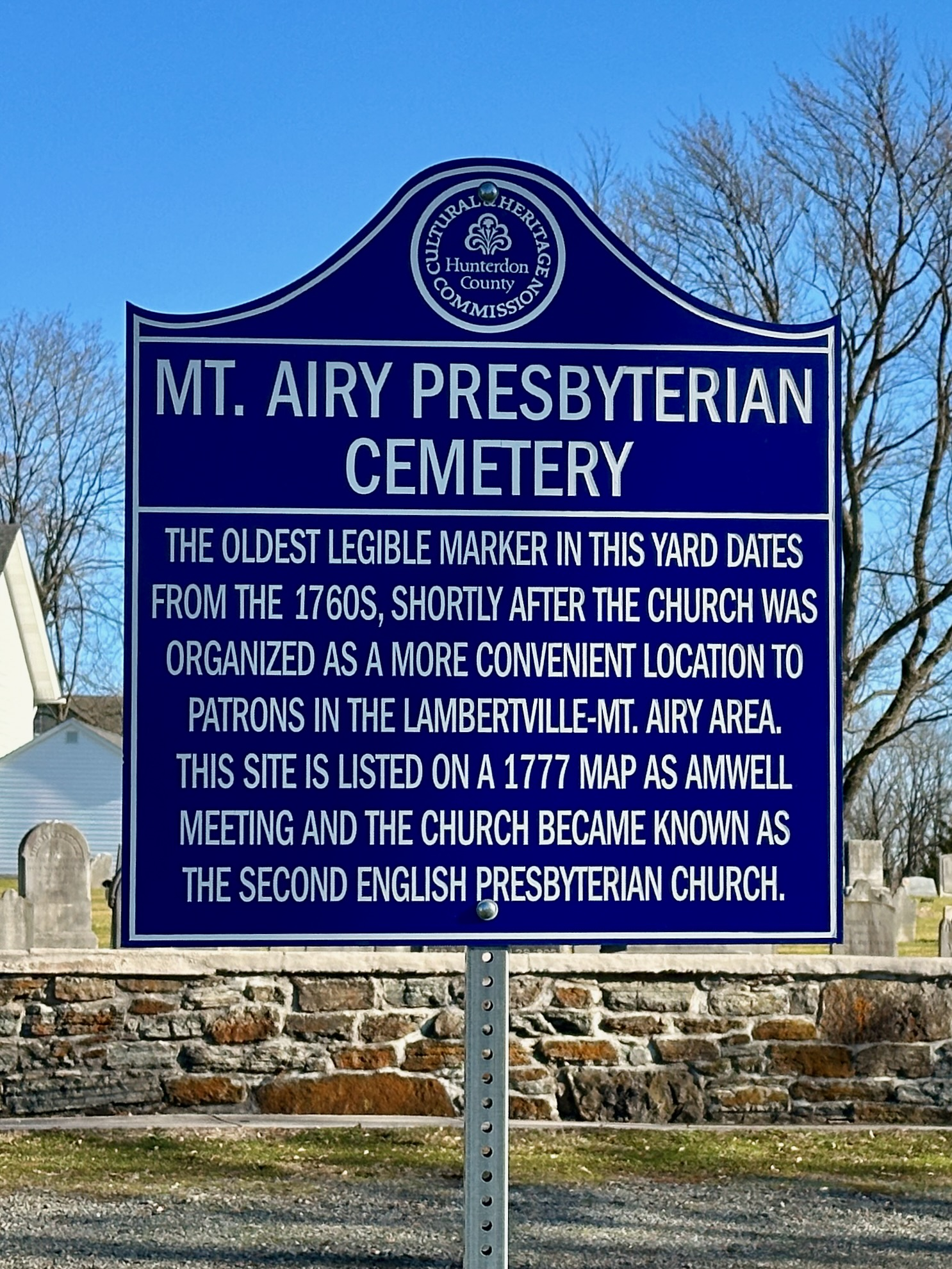
Cemetery information sign
