= Reformed Dutch Church of Wyckoff =

Historic church in New Jersey, United States

- U.S. National Register of Historic Places
- New Jersey Register of Historic Places
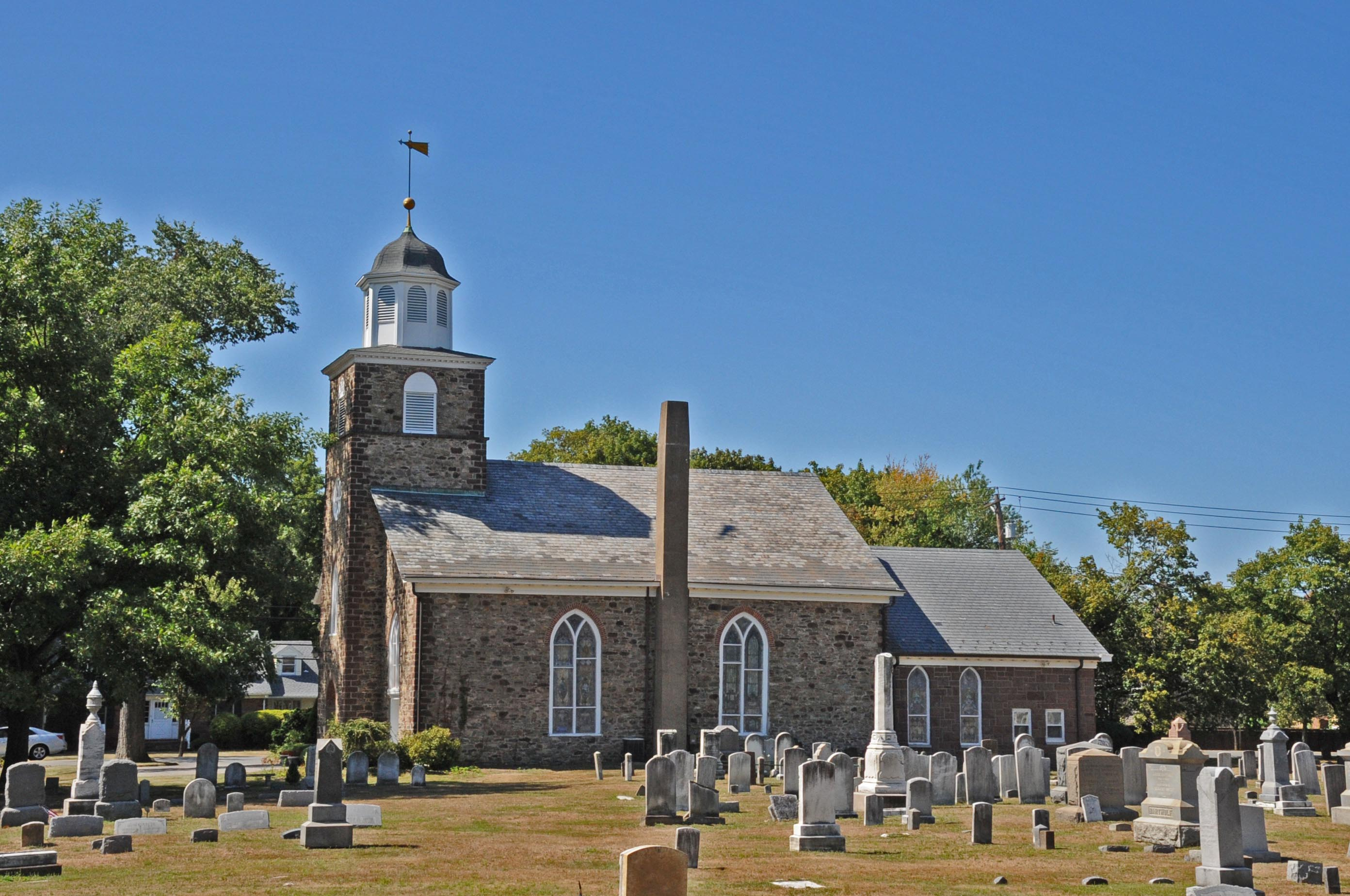
- Reformed Dutch Church of Wyckoff

- Location within Bergen County, New Jersey Location within New Jersey Location within the United States
- Location: 580 Wyckoff Avenue, Wyckoff, New Jersey
- Coordinates: 41°0′24″N 74°10′24.4″W
- Area: 4.6 acres (1.9 ha)
- Built: 1806
- Built by: Daniel Baldwin (Carpentry)
- Architectural style: Early Republic, Gothic Revival
- NRHP reference No.: 03000250
- NJRHP No.: 4146

Significant dates
- Added to NRHP: April 17, 2003
- Designated NJRHP: March 3, 2003

The Reformed Dutch Church of Wyckoff is located at 580 Wyckoff Avenue in the township of Wyckoff in Bergen County, United States. The historic stone church was built in 1806 and was documented as the Wycoff Reformed Church by the Historic American Buildings Survey (HABS) in 1937. It was added to the National Register of Historic Places on April 17, 2003, for its significance in architecture. The listing includes the church cemetery.

== History and description ==
The church was built of local fieldstone in 1806. The carpentry was done by Daniel Baldwin. It features vernacular Early Republic, Federal architecture. The windows have Gothic Revival style.

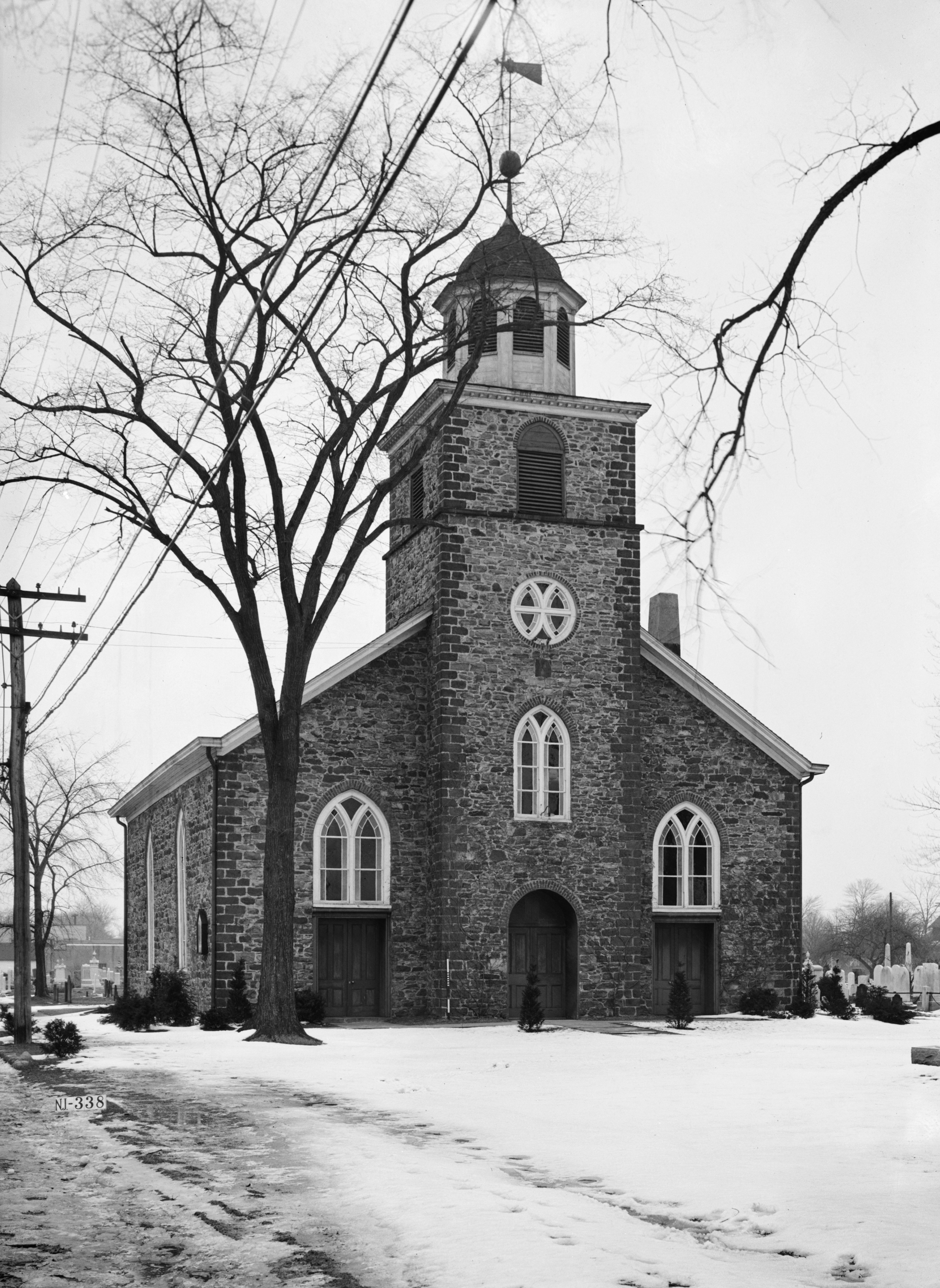
HABS photo from 1937

== See also ==
- National Register of Historic Places listings in Wyckoff, New Jersey
- National Register of Historic Places listings in Bergen County, New Jersey
