= Amwell Church of the Brethren =

Church in Stockton, New Jersey, US

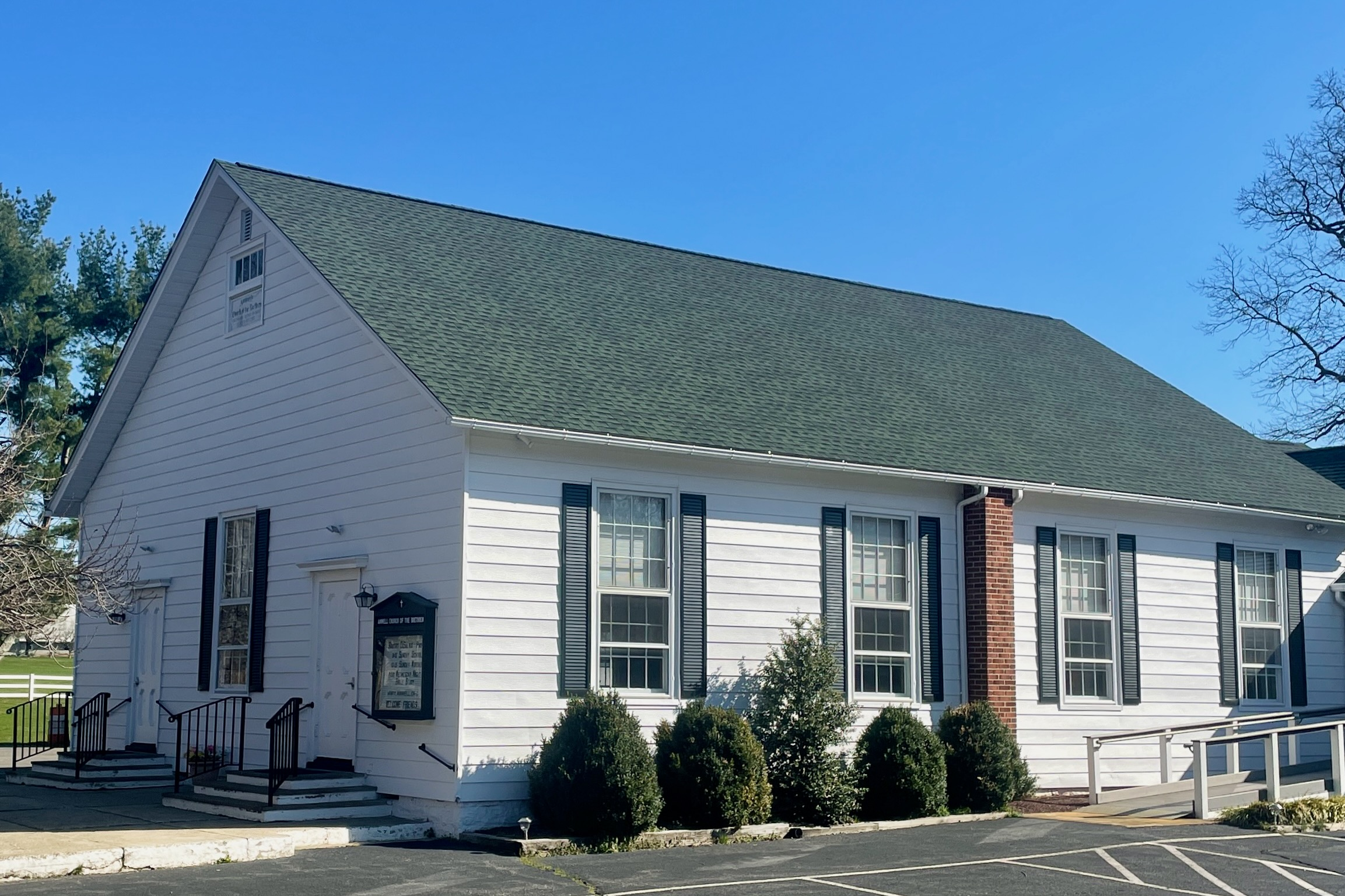
- Amwell Church of the Brethren
- 40°26′56.5″N 74°54′48.7″W
- Address: 40 Sandbrook-Headquarters Road, Stockton, New Jersey
- Country: United States
- Denomination: Church of the Brethren

History
- Founded: 1733
- Founder: John Naas

The Amwell Church of the Brethren, also known as the Dunkard Church, is located at 40 Sandbrook-Headquarters Road in Delaware Township, near the borough of Stockton, in Hunterdon County, New Jersey, United States. The Church of the Brethren congregation was formed in 1733 under the leadership of Rev. John Naas.

== Lower Amwell Cemetery ==
=== Old Yard ===
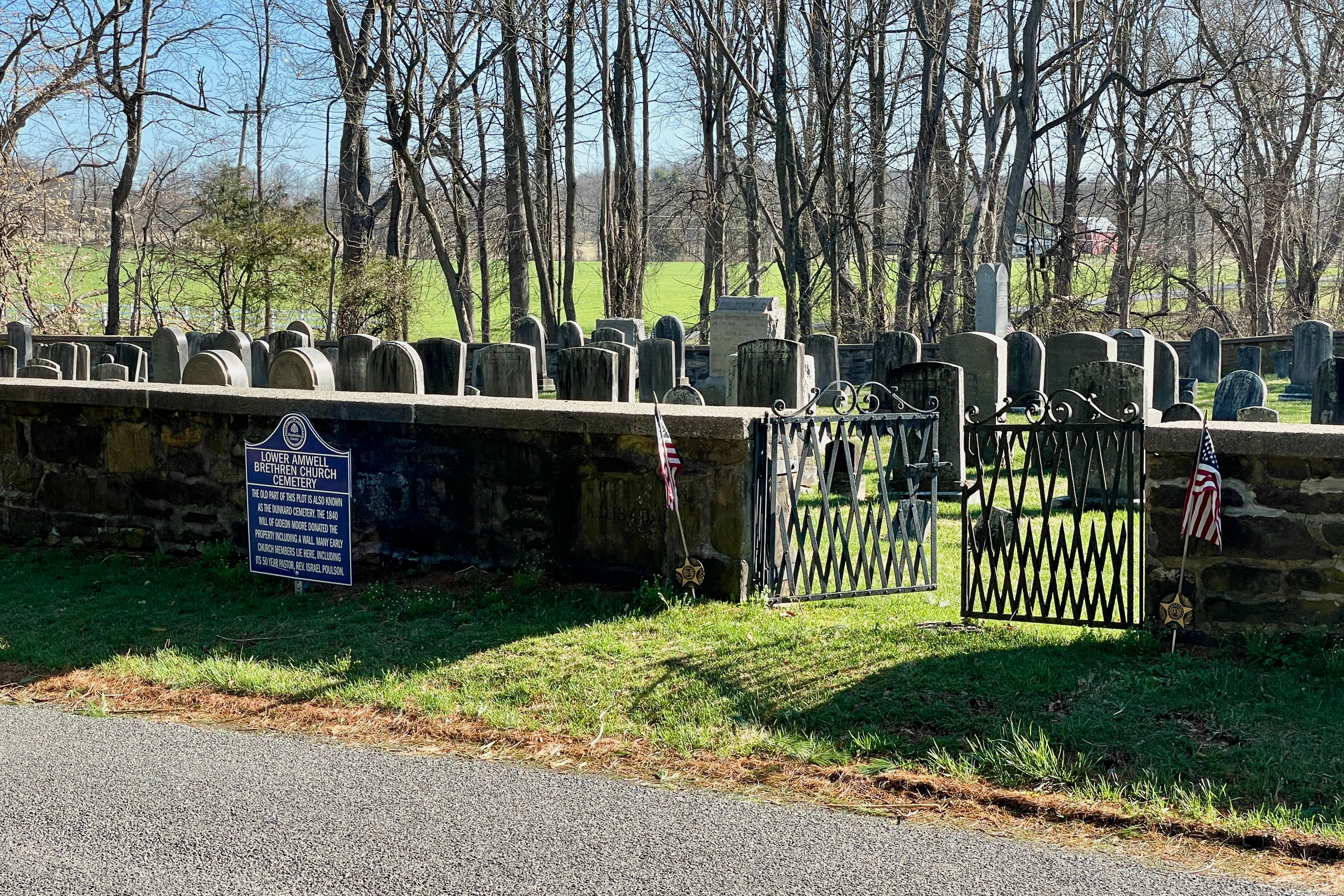
Lower Amwell Cemetery - Old Yard

The Lower Amwell Cemetery - Old Yard, also known as the Dunkard Cemetery, is located at 32 Sandbrook-Headquarters Road. The property was donated by Gideon Moore.

=== New Yard ===
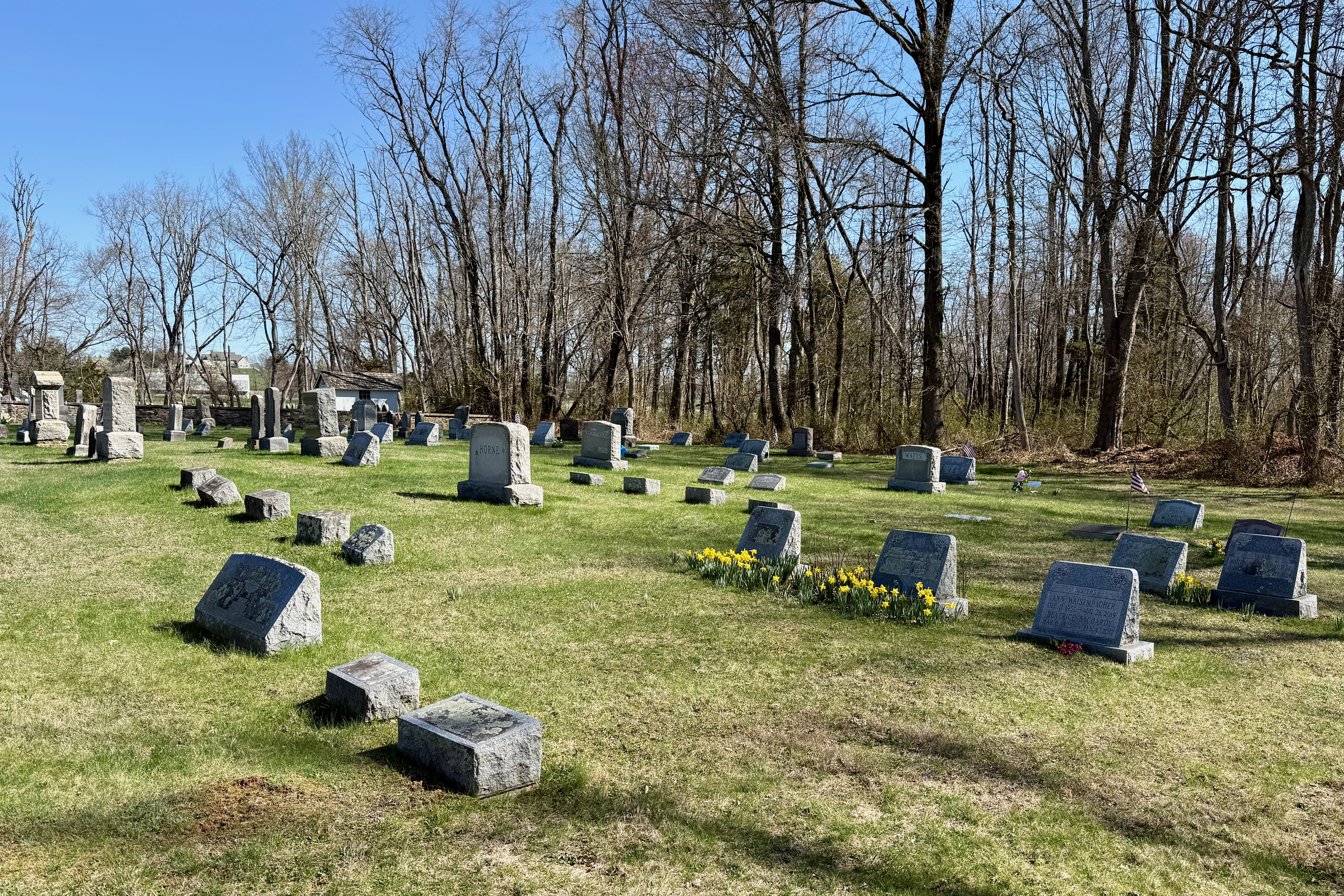
Lower Amwell Cemetery - New Yard

The New Yard cemetery is adjacent to the Old Yard.

== See also ==
- Sand Brook German Baptist Church
