= Coopertown Meetinghouse =

Historic church in New Jersey, United States

- U.S. National Register of Historic Places
- New Jersey Register of Historic Places
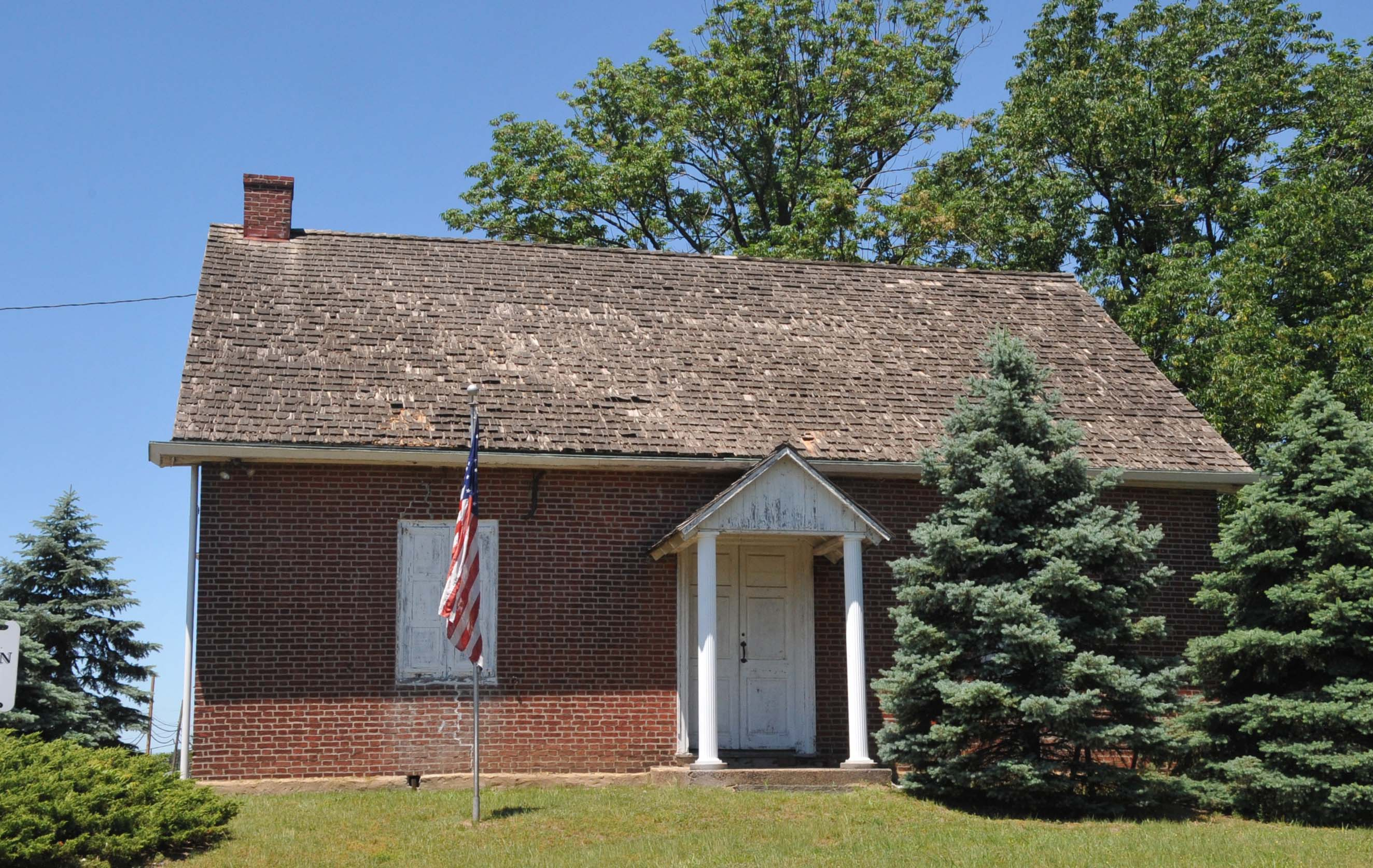

- Location within Burlington County, New Jersey Location within New Jersey Location within the United States
- Location: Cooper Street at US Route 130, Cooperstown, New Jersey
- Coordinates: 40°2′52.2″N 74°54′14.8″W
- Area: 5.3 acres (2.1 ha)
- Built: 1806
- NRHP reference No.: 78001750
- NJRHP No.: 794

Significant dates
- Added to NRHP: May 22, 1978
- Designated NJRHP: December 19, 1977

The Coopertown Meetinghouse, also called Coopertown Church and Coopertown Union Sunday School, is a historic church meeting house located on Cooper Street in the Cooperstown section of Edgewater Park Township in Burlington County, New Jersey, United States. It was built in 1806 and added to the National Register of Historic Places on May 22, 1978, for its significance in religion and philosophy.

== History and description ==
The meetinghouse is a one-story brick building with Flemish bond. The project was led by James Simpson, a visiting Quaker minister. When the building was completed in 1806, it was used by Methodists, Episcopalians, Baptists and Friends. The Coopertown Union Sunday School was organized in 1880. The property also includes the adjoining graveyard, the Coopertown Meeting House Cemetery.

== See also ==
- National Register of Historic Places listings in Burlington County, New Jersey
