= Central Jersey Regional Airport =

Airport in Hillsborough Township, New Jersey, United States

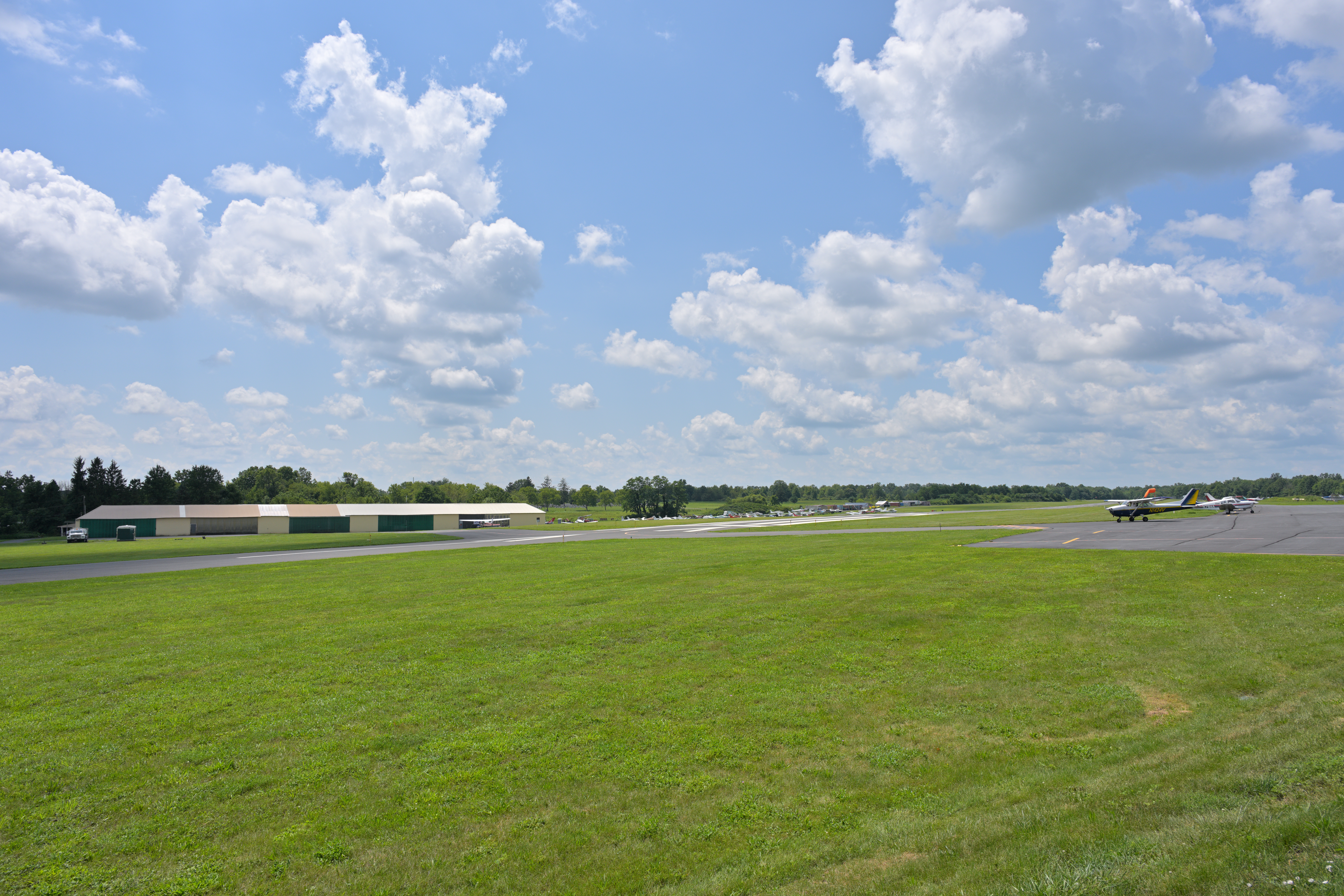
- The airport as seen from Schmidt Street
- IATA: none; ICAO: none; FAA LID: 47N

Summary
- Airport type: Public use
- Owner: Central Jersey Airport Services Inc.
- Serves: Hillsborough, New Jersey
- Location: Hillsborough Township, Somerset County
- Elevation AMSL: 86 ft (26 m)
- Coordinates: 40°31′28″N 074°35′54″W
- Website: CentralJerseyAirport.com

Maps
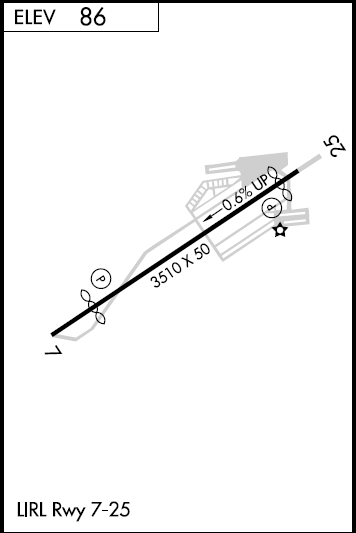
- Interactive map of Central Jersey Regional Airport

Runways
Direction	Length		Surface
Direction	ft	m	Surface
7/25	3,507	1,069	Asphalt

Statistics (2022)
- Aircraft operations (year ending 9/30/2022): 46,300
- Based aircraft: 90
- Source: Federal Aviation Administration

Central Jersey Regional Airport (IATA: JVI, FAA LID: 47N) is a privately owned, public use airport in Somerset County, New Jersey, United States. The airport is one nautical mile (2 km) south of the central business district of Manville. It is located in Hillsborough Township and was formerly known as Kupper Airport. This facility is included in the National Plan of Integrated Airport Systems for 2011–2015, which categorized it as a general aviation reliever airport.

On the airport property is the Van Nest – Weston Burying Ground, a small cemetery.

The airport was originally owned by Charles Kupper who was a real estate investor and managed by Manville Aviation. One of the notable features of the airport is stiff crosswinds from the northwest, making landing challenging at times. The airport originally sold 80LL and 100LL aviation fuel. During the late 1960s into the early 1970s, a short 2,000 foot unimproved or grass runway was constructed running perpendicular to the paved runway starting approximately 100' NE of the beginning of runway 7, extending southeast.

== Facilities and aircraft ==
Central Jersey Regional Airport covers an area of 119 acres (48 ha) at an elevation of 86 feet (26 m) above mean sea level. It has one runway designated 7/25 with an asphalt surface measuring 3,507 by 50 feet (1,069 x 15 m).

For the 12-month period ending September 7, 2022, the airport had 46,300 general aviation aircraft operations, an average of 127 per day. At that time, there were 90 aircraft based at this airport: 87 single-engine, and 3 multi-engine.

=== On field ===
- Fuel: 100LL
- Parking
- Aircraft service
- Aircraft rental
- Pilot lounge and supplies
- Raritan Valley Composite Squadron (NJ-003) of the Civil Air Patrol
- Pizza & Pasta Restaurant

== See also ==
- List of airports in New Jersey
