= Sandy Ridge, New Jersey =

Populated place in Hunterdon County, New Jersey, US

- Unincorporated community
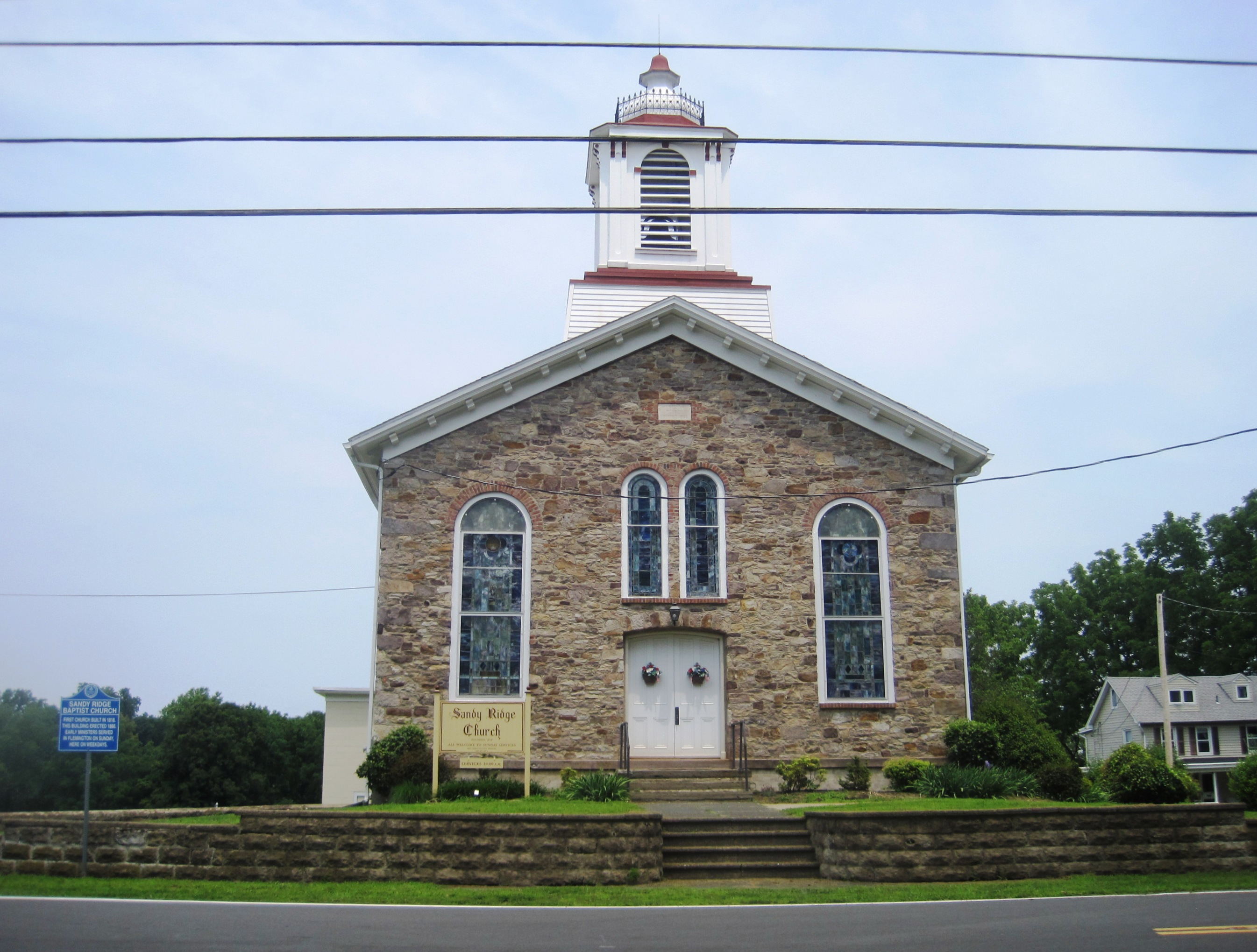
- The Sandy Ridge Baptist Church, built in 1866

- Location of Sandy Ridge in Hunterdon County Inset: Location of county within the state of New Jersey Sandy Ridge, New Jersey (New Jersey) Sandy Ridge, New Jersey (the United States)
- Coordinates: 40°25′23″N 74°57′09″W
- Country: United States
- State: New Jersey
- County: Hunterdon
- Township: Delaware
- Elevation: 404 ft (123 m)
- GNIS feature ID: 883589

Sandy Ridge is an unincorporated community located within Delaware Township in Hunterdon County, in the U.S. state of New Jersey. As its name implies, the community is located at the top of a small hill that is sandwiched between the Hunterdon Plateau and the Sourland Mountains. Sandy Ridge Road is the main road east and west through the community while County Route 605 is a minor arterial road that passes north and south through the area. CR 605 enters from the south on Sandy Ridge-Mt. Airy Road, jogs to the west on Sandy Ridge Road for 0.04 miles (64 m), and exits to the north on Cemetery Road towards CR 523. The area consists of mainly residences with some farmland and forestland. The Sandy Ridge Church (with adjacent cemetery) is a Baptist church founded in 1818 with its current building constructed in 1866 and is located in the center of Sandy Ridge.
