= Amwell =

Amwell may refer to:

== Places ==
=== Hertfordshire, England ===
- Great Amwell near Ware in East Hertfordshire
- Little Amwell, now part of Hertford Heath, East Hertfordshire
- Amwell, St Albans, a hamlet in the parish of Wheathampstead

=== United States ===
- Amwell Township, Pennsylvania
- Amwell Township, New Jersey, since subdivided into:
  - West Amwell Township, New Jersey
  - East Amwell Township, New Jersey
    - Amwell, New Jersey, an unincorporated community on the eastern border of East Amwell Township
- Amwell Valley, a valley in Hunterdon County, New Jersey

== Businesses ==
- Amwell Valley Vineyards, later renamed Old York Cellars
- Amwell (company), a telemedicine company formerly known as American Well
