= Francis Geary =

Francis Geary may refer to:

- Sir Francis Geary, 1st Baronet (1709–1796), Royal Navy admiral
- Francis Geary (1752–1776), the admiral's son, killed in the Ambush of Geary during the American Revolutionary War
