= Volendam (disambiguation) =

Volendam is a town in North Holland in the Netherlands.

== Ships ==
Several ships have been named after the town. They include:

- SS Volendam, a transatlantic liner built in 1922 and scrapped in 1951
- SS Brasil (1957), an ocean liner renamed Volendam in 1972 and scrapped in 2004
- MS Volendam, a cruise ship built in 1999

== Other ==
Volendam may also refer to:

- Volendam Colony, a Russian Mennonite settlement in Paraguay, named after the 1922 steamship
- FC Volendam, a professional football club based in Volendam, Netherlands
- Volendam neurodegenerative disease, a type of Pontocerebellar hypoplasia
- Volendam New Year's fire, a deadly café fire in Volendam in the New Year's night of 2000–2001
- Volendam Windmill, a windmill in Holland Township, New Jersey, United States
