= Hopewell Project =

Hopewell Project may refer to:

- The Hopewell Project, a solar-powered residence in Hopewell, New Jersey.
- The Bangkok Elevated Road and Train System, commonly known as the Hopewell Project, a failed elevated highway and rail construction project in Bangkok.
