= Ambush of Geary =

Skirmish of the American Revolutionary War

Coordinates: 40°27′25″N 74°51′34″W

- Part of the American Revolutionary War
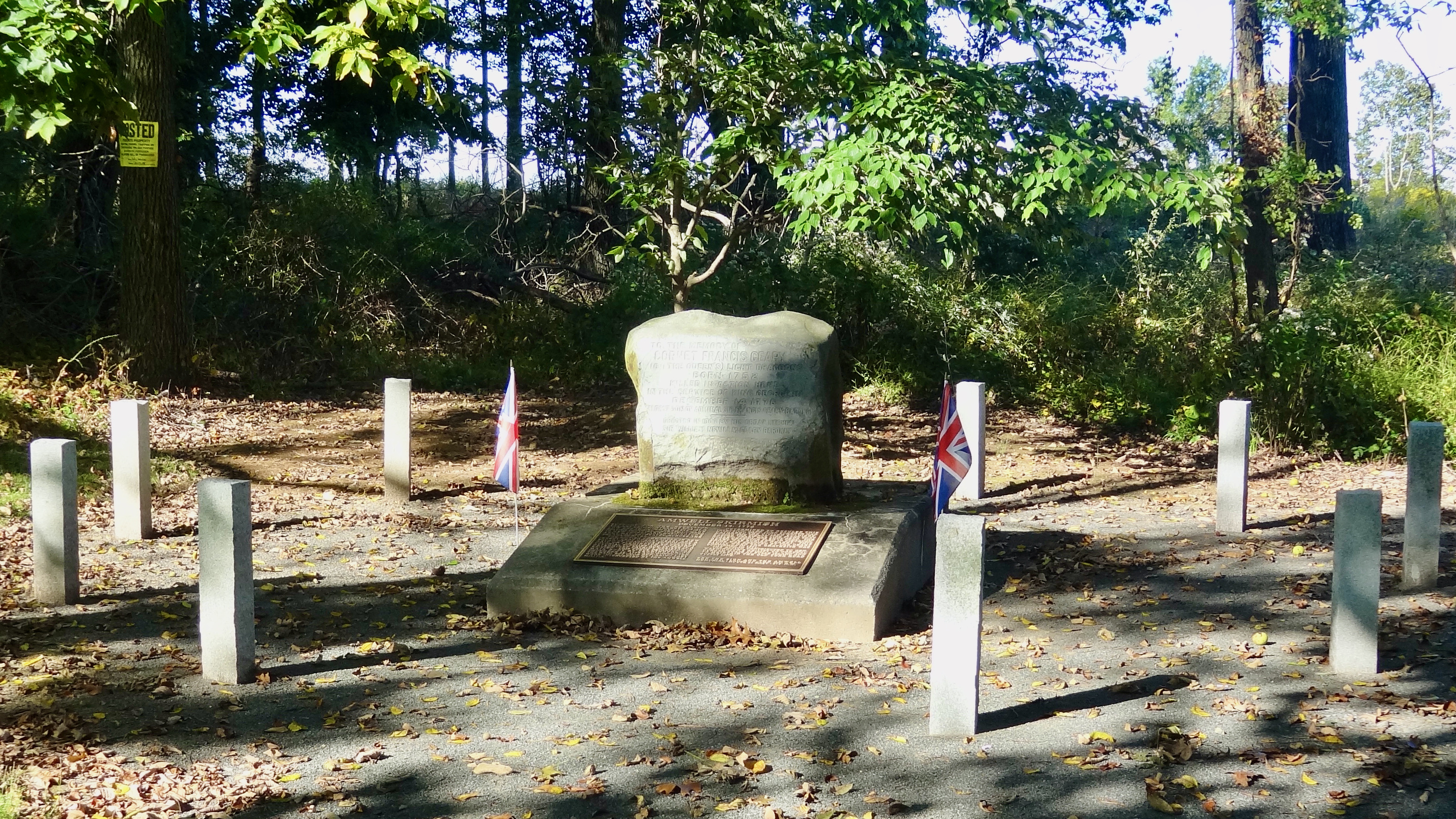
- Cornet Francis Geary memorial site
Date	14 December 1776
Location	Amwell Township, New Jersey (now Raritan Township, New Jersey)
Result	American victory

Belligerents
(Kingdom of Great Britain) 16th (Queen's) Light Dragoons	(United States) Local Patriot militia

Commanders and leaders
Cornet Francis Geary †	Captain John Schenck

Strength
8	8

Casualties and losses
One killed	None
- Location within Hunterdon County, New Jersey Ambush site (New Jersey) Ambush site (the United States)

The Ambush of Geary, also known as the Amwell Skirmish, was a skirmish of the American Revolutionary War fought on 14 December 1776 in Amwell Township of Hunterdon County, New Jersey. Cornet Francis Geary, the leader of a company of dragoons, was shot in an ambush set up by local militiamen led by Captain John Schenck.

After British forces captured New York City in the first part of the New York and New Jersey campaign, they established outposts throughout central New Jersey. Geary, the son of Admiral Sir Francis Geary, was operating from a station at Pennington when he was killed in the ambush. His body was concealed and later buried in a shallow grave, preventing its recovery by British troops. In the 19th century local historical interest led to the confirmation of his grave's location, and the establishment of markers at the site and in England.

Making a casualty of Geary was one of a number of militia actions that resulted in a reduced scope of British reconnaissance, contributing to the eventual success of George Washington's crossing of the Delaware River and victory at the Battle of Trenton.

== Background ==
After General William Howe successfully drove George Washington's Continental Army out of New York City in the fall of 1776, Washington retreated across New Jersey, pursued by General Charles Cornwallis. Washington retreated all the way across the Delaware River in early December, and the British began arranging winter quarters in New Jersey, establishing a chain of outposts from Perth Amboy to Bordentown.

The British and their Hessian allies regularly sent out reconnaissance and foraging parties. These were vulnerable to attack by local Patriot militia companies. The area around the Trenton outpost, commanded by Johann Rall and populated primarily by Hessians, was particularly vulnerable to these militia raids, as was a detachment of the 16th (Queen's) Light Dragoons posted not far away from Trenton at Pennington. Hunterdon County, north of Trenton, was an area where atrocities were reported in early December, including claims of rape of girls and pregnant women, perpetrated by groups of British and German soldiers; these reports contributed to an increase in Patriot militia activity in the area north of Trenton.

Cornet Francis Geary was the eldest son and heir of Admiral Sir Francis Geary and Mary Bartholomew. Born in 1752, he was raised in Surrey and educated at Balliol College, Oxford. Purchasing a cornetcy in the 16th Light Dragoons in 1773, Geary was sent to North America in 1776, arriving in New York at the end of September. In October and November, Geary's unit was mainly occupied with forays in northern New Jersey where they met little organized resistance, but on 1 December, his company was ordered to camp at Pennington. On 14 December, Cornet Geary and seven other members of the 16th were sent north on a reconnaissance mission.

== Ambush ==
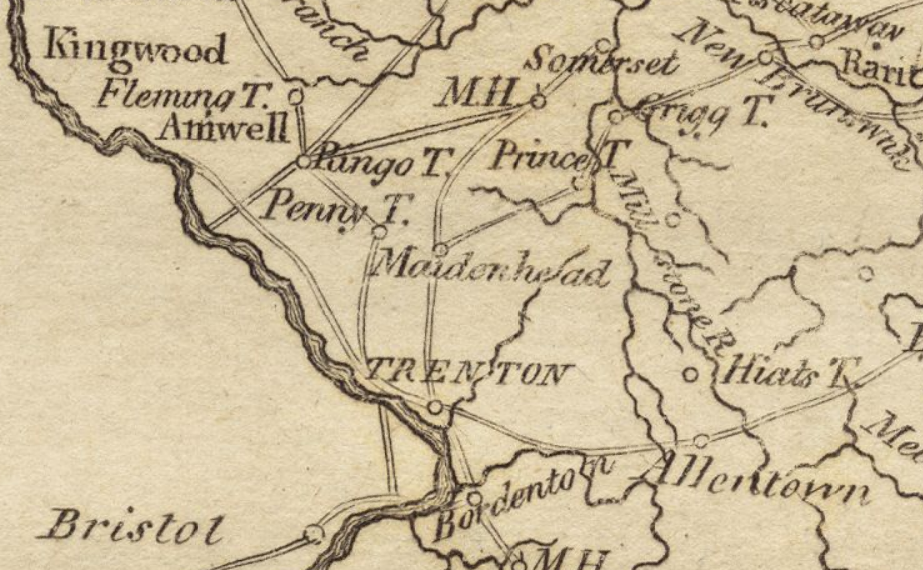
1806 map of the area

The most detailed source for this action is a deposition attached to the application for a military pension of John Schanck, cousin of Captain John Schenck, the leader of the Patriot militia; detailed British accounts do not appear to exist. According to this account, Geary's party rode through Amwell Township toward Flemington to verify that a supply of salt beef and pork was ready for the army to pick up. The deponent had received intelligence of this movement the previous day, and when John Schenck learned of it, he set out the next morning, gathering up a few men (eight in number, according to the deponent), and set up an ambush in a wooded area about 5 miles (8.0 km) south of Flemington. When Geary's company rode by, the militia fired a volley of musket fire, killing Geary. A more brief description by a non-participating British officer reporting the event indicated that Geary was alerted to the impending fire, but was unable to escape the volley. The dragoons returned fire, but were driven off by continuing militia fire.

== Aftermath ==
The militiamen appropriated portions of Geary's uniform, including his sword and the silver plate on his cap that had his name inscribed on it. British troops that had been sent out to meet them and take the supplies questioned the local inhabitants and searched the area, but could not find his body. The militiamen had concealed it; it was buried in a shallow grave the next day.

General John Burgoyne, in his capacity as colonel of the 16th, wrote to Admiral Geary:

I have seldom felt a pain so acute as that of communicating to you the news from America, which personally regards yourself. I am afraid my authority is too good. Your Son has met a Soldier's fate. Experienced in calamity, describes what it is to resign an object near the heart, and ho[w] poor our best fortitude is upon such trial I am unfit to comfort or exhort you. Time and reflection can alone relieve you: I wish therefore only add to the tears of the Corps. My private lamentations for the Son of an invaluable parent and the assurance of the respect I have bear to his memory.

— Burgoyne to Admiral Francis Geary, 26 February 1777

This ambush and similar militia attacks resulted in British troops reducing the range of their scouting forays, as the danger of going further than about 4 miles (6.4 km) from Trenton was significant. This was crucial when the Americans began massing boats along the Delaware River prior to George Washington's crossing of the Delaware River that culminated with the Battle of Trenton on 26 December 1776. Geary's troops were stationed only 5 miles (8.0 km) from the river and Malta Island, the staging area for the crossing.

== Legacy ==
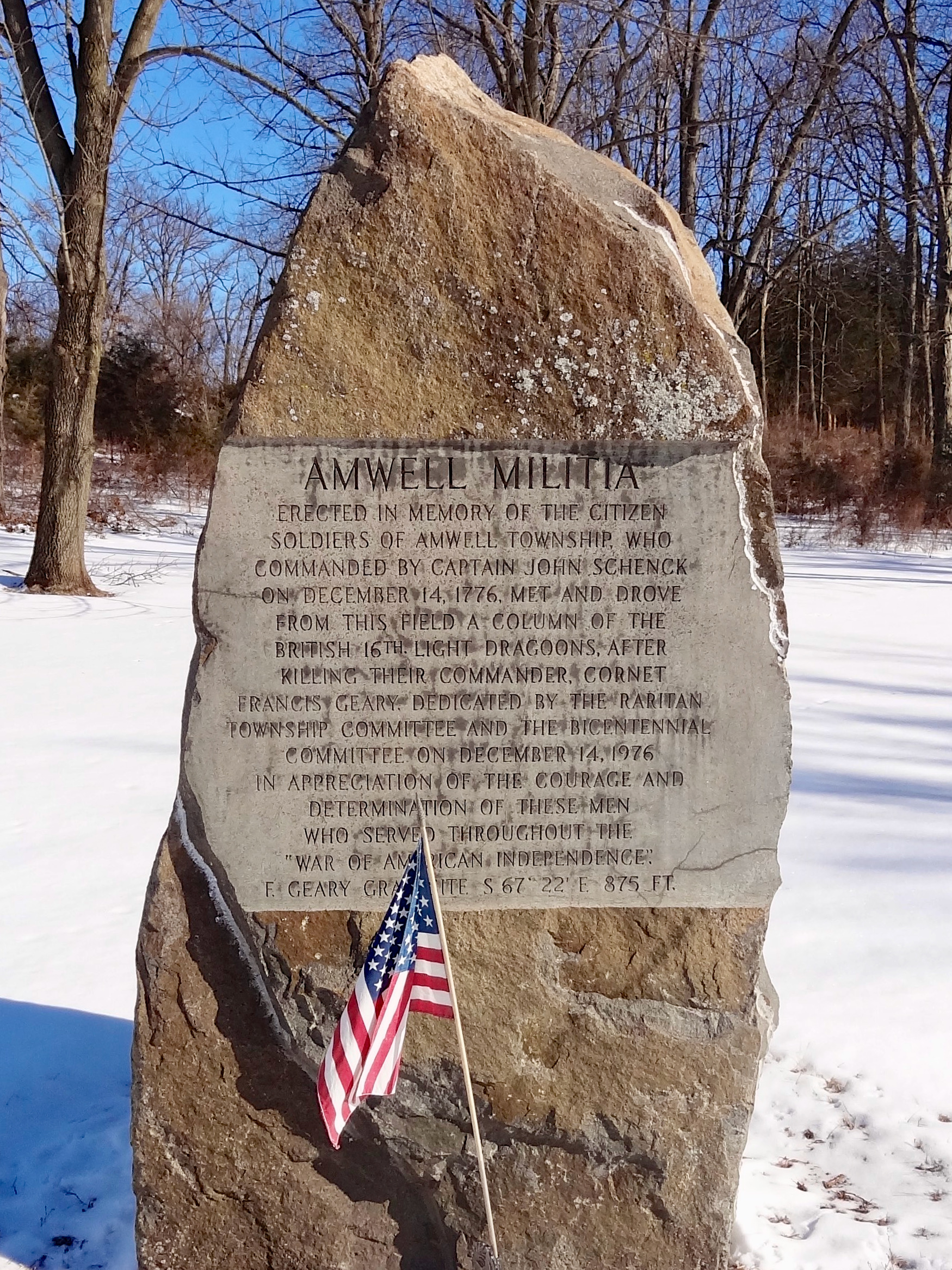
Amwell Militia monument at the ambush site

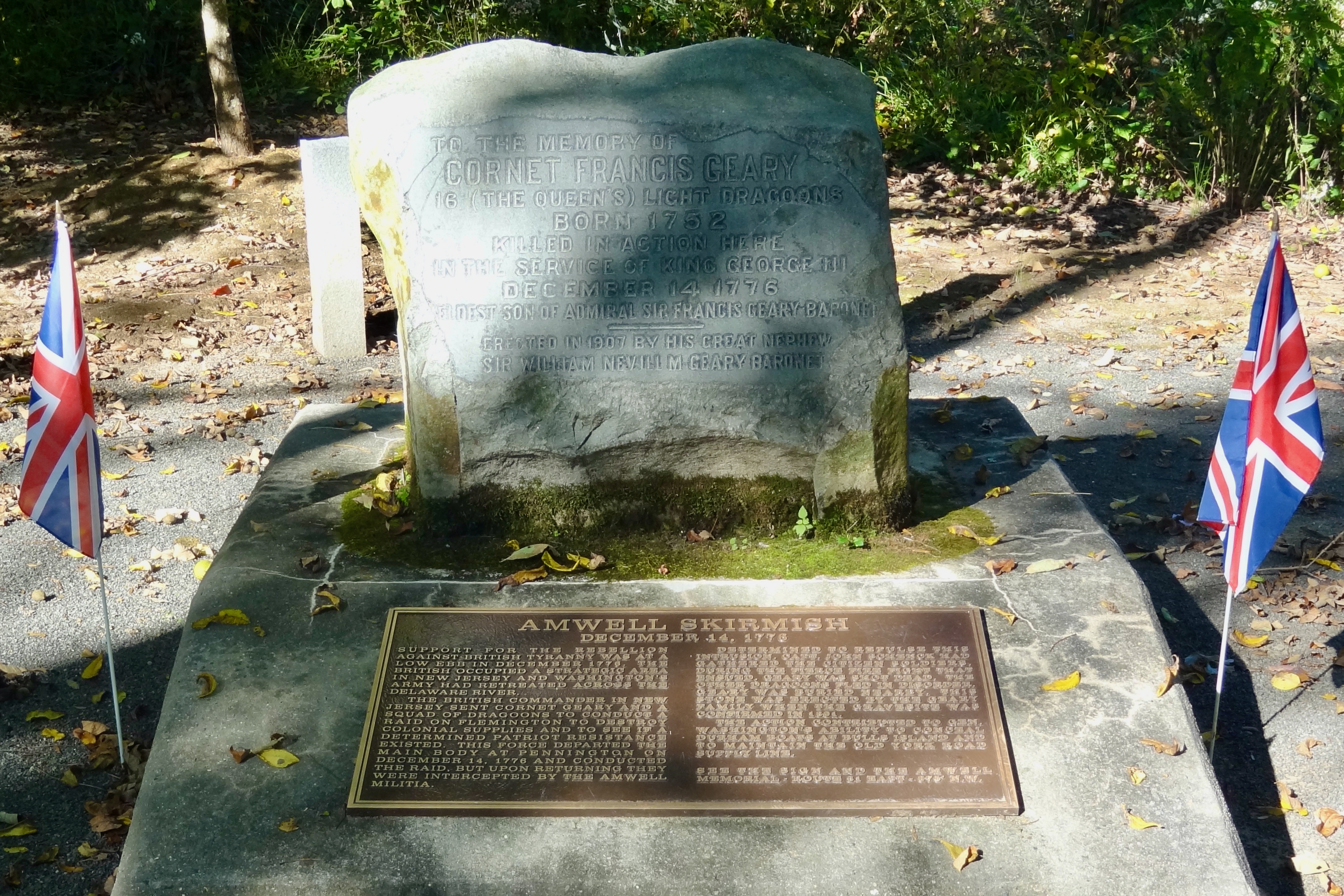
Cornet Francis Geary memorial monument and Amwell Skirmish history plaque

Hunterdon County traditions claim that Geary's belongings were hidden to prevent their discovery by British troops. His coat is said to have been hidden under a pile of wheat on the floor of a garret, while his boots were hidden in an oven. It is also said that Geary's red sash was unravelled and the thread was used for various ornamental purposes, his sword was melted to make teaspoons and his stiff leather hat was used by a farmer to dip oats from his feed bin for his horses.

Many local residents of Hunterdon County were unaware that Geary had been buried there, and accounts persisted that the British had recovered his body. In 1891 the Hunterdon County Historical Society exhumed a body from a site suspected to contain his body. Found in the grave were a skeleton and silver buttons labeled "Q. L. D.", signifying the Queen's Light Dragoons. His family placed a grave marker on the site in 1907. The St. Nicholas Church in Great Bookham, Surrey, contains a bas-relief depicting Cornet Francis Geary and the incident.

The ambush site is between Copper Hill and Larison's Corners, in Raritan Township. On 14 December 1976, as part of the United States Bicentennial, the township dedicated a monument to the Amwell Militia here. The memorial monument to Geary erected in 1907 by his great nephew, Sir William Nevill Montgomerie Geary, is located nearby, 875 feet (267 meters) away. A historical information plaque describing the Amwell Skirmish is also located next to his memorial.

== See also ==
- Geary baronets
