= Flemington-Raritan Regional School District =

School district in Hunterdon County, New Jersey, US

Address
- 50 Court Street Flemington, Hunterdon County, New Jersey, 08822; United States
- Coordinates: 40.510225°N 74.86399°W

District information
- Grades: PreK-8
- Superintendent: Kari McGann
- Business administrator: Tanya Dawson
- Schools: 6

Students and staff
- Enrollment: 3,174 (as of 2023–24)
- Faculty: 335.3 FTEs
- Student–teacher ratio: 9.5:1

Other information
- District Factor Group: I
- Website: www.frsd.us
Ind.	Per pupil	District spending	Rank (*)	K-8 average	%± vs. average
1A	Total Spending	$17,831	53	$18,891	−5.6%
1	Budgetary Cost	13,686	39	14,159	−3.3%
2	Classroom Instruction	8,673	48	8,659	0.2%
6	Support Services	1,583	14	2,167	−26.9%
8	Administrative Cost	1,683	56	1,547	8.8%
10	Operations & Maintenance	1,581	47	1,612	−1.9%
13	Extracurricular Activities	69	22	104	−33.7%
16	Median Teacher Salary	59,690	29	61,136
Data from NJDoE 2014 Taxpayers' Guide to Education Spending. *Of K-8 districts with more than 750 students. Lowest spending=1; Highest=84

The Flemington-Raritan Regional School District is a comprehensive regional public school district in eastern Hunterdon County, in the U.S. state of New Jersey, which serves students in pre-kindergarten through eighth grades from the neighboring communities of Flemington Borough and Raritan Township.

As of the 2023–24 school year, the district, comprised of six schools, had an enrollment of 3,174 students and 335.3 classroom teachers (on an FTE basis), for a student–teacher ratio of 9.5:1.

The district had been classified by the New Jersey Department of Education as being in District Factor Group "I", the second-highest of eight groupings. District Factor Groups organize districts statewide to allow comparison by common socioeconomic characteristics of the local districts. From lowest socioeconomic status to highest, the categories are A, B, CD, DE, FG, GH, I and J.

Public school students in ninth through twelfth grades attend Hunterdon Central Regional High School, part of the Hunterdon Central Regional High School District, which serves students in central Hunterdon County from Flemington and Raritan Township, as well as from Delaware Township, East Amwell Township and Readington Township. As of the 2023–24 school year, the high school had an enrollment of 2,408 students and 226.7 classroom teachers (on an FTE basis), for a student–teacher ratio of 10.6:1.

== District overview ==
The district's four elementary schools offer students in grades K-4 a comprehensive educational program emphasizing process instruction techniques, cooperative learning, and integration of subject content areas. The K-2 program uses a balanced literacy approach to reading while math and science are taught through hands-on experiences. In heterogeneous classes, these students also study social studies and use computers. The 3-5 program includes literature-based reading, process writing, hands-on math and science, social studies and computers, all taught in heterogeneous classes. Teachers develop themes to integrate content areas wherever possible. Related arts instruction includes art, music, computer education, library skills, physical education, health and family life and world languages.

The Reading-Fleming Intermediate School houses the district's fifth and sixth grade students.

For grades 7–8, J.P. Case Middle School is organized as a house plan with academic teams at each grade level. This supports the small school atmosphere while providing various course options. Each team of students is taught the academic subjects by a corresponding team of teachers who meet regularly to monitor student progress and plan instructional programs. Academic subjects include reading, language arts, math, science, and social studies. An expanded related arts curriculum includes instruction in world languages, home economics and material processing, as well as art, music, computer education, library skills, physical education, and health and family life.

== Awards and recognition ==
The NAMM Foundation named the district in its 2008 survey of the "Best Communities for Music Education", which included 110 school districts nationwide.

== Schools ==
The district is comprised of four PreK/K to 4 elementary schools, one intermediate school for grades 5 and 6 and a middle school for grades 7 and 8. Schools in the district (with 2023–24 enrollment data from the National Center for Education Statistics) are:

Elementary schools

- Barley Sheaf School with 363 students in grades K–4 (located in Flemington)
  - Amy Switkes, principal
- Copper Hill School with 602 students in grades PreK–4 (Ringoes)
  - Jesse Lockett, principal
- Francis A. Desmares School with 420 students in grades K–4 (Flemington)
  - Mark Masessa, principal
- Robert Hunter School with 394 students in grades K–4 (Flemington)
  - Jessica Braynor, principal

Intermediate school

- Reading-Fleming Intermediate School with 702 students in grades 5–6 (Flemington)
  - Anthony DeMarco, principal

Middle school

- J. P. Case Middle School with 675 students in grades 7–8 (Flemington)
  - Bob Castellano, principal

== Administration ==
Core members of the district's administration are:

- Kari McGann, superintendent
- Tanya Dawson, business administrator and board secretary

== Board of education ==
The district's board of education, comprised of nine members, sets policy and oversees the fiscal and educational operation of the district through its administration. As a Type II school district, the board's trustees are elected directly by voters to serve three-year terms of office on a staggered basis, with three seats up for election each year held (since 2012) as part of the November general election. The board appoints a superintendent to oversee the district's day-to-day operations and a business administrator to supervise the business functions of the district. The seats on the board of education are allocated based on the population of the constituent municipalities, with seven seats allocated to Raritan Township and two to Flemington.
