= Amwell Township, New Jersey =

- Township
- 1731–1837 location of Amwell Township Amwell Township (New Jersey) Amwell Township (the United States)
- Coordinates: 40°27′N 74°53′W
- Country: United States
- State: New Jersey
- County: Hunterdon
- Royal patent: 1708
- Township: 1798
- Dissolved: 1846
- Named for: Great and Little Amwell, Hertfordshire

Amwell Township was a Township that existed in Hunterdon County, New Jersey, United States, from 1708 to 1846.

The Township was established by royal patent on June 8, 1708, from Queen Anne, the first sovereign of the combined kingdom of Great Britain, while the area was part of West Jersey. At the time of its inception, its territory comprised 200 square miles (520 km^{2}) and included the present day Delaware Township, Raritan Township, Readington Township, East Amwell Township and West Amwell Township and portions of Clinton, Lebanon and Tewksbury Townships. The township was named for Great and Little Amwell, Hertfordshire in England.

On March 11, 1714, it became part of the newly formed Hunterdon County. Lebanon Township was first mentioned on October 26, 1731, as having been created from Amwell Township, though the exact date of its formation is unknown. Reading Township (now known as Readington Township) was created from portions of Amwell Township on July 15, 1730.

On February 21, 1798, Amwell Township was incorporated by an Act of the New Jersey Legislature as one of New Jersey's initial 104 townships. On April 2, 1838, both Delaware Township and Raritan Township were created from portions of Amwell Township. On April 6, 1846, Amwell was split into East and West Amwell Townships, and Amwell Township was dissolved.

== History ==
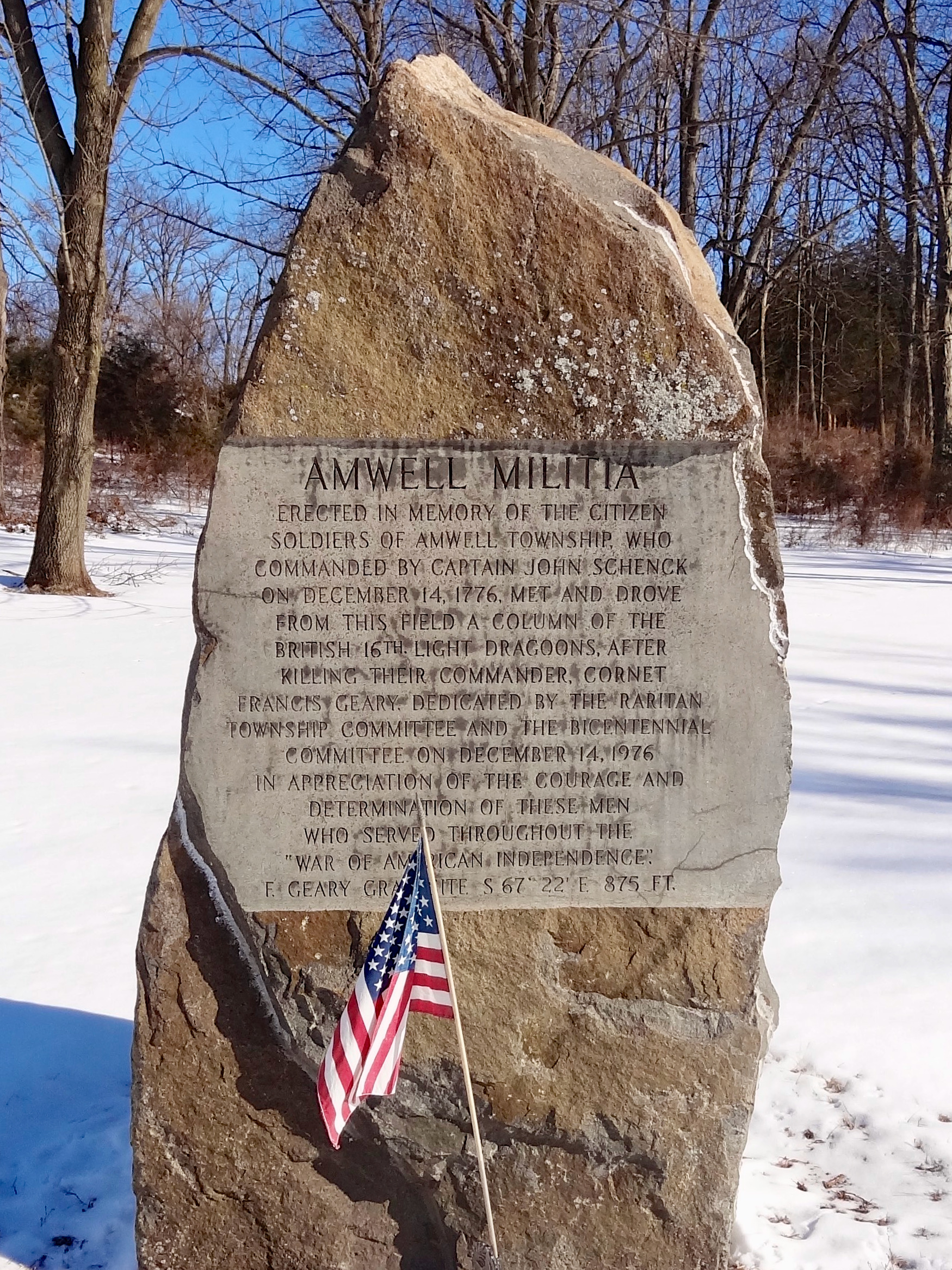
Amwell Militia monument for Captain John Schenck and the Ambush of Geary

On December 14, 1776, during the American Revolutionary War, local militia led by Captain John Schenck ambushed a party of British dragoons returning from a raid on Flemington. The British leader, Cornet Francis Geary, was killed during this skirmish, known as the Ambush of Geary, that took place between Copper Hill and Larison's Corners. The ambush site is now located in Raritan Township. On December 14, 1976, as part of the United States Bicentennial, the township dedicated a monument to the Amwell Militia here. A memorial monument to Geary is located nearby along with a plaque describing the Amwell Skirmish.

== Notable people ==
Notable people who resided in Amwell Township include:

- William Kirkpatrick (1769–1832), represented New York in Congress from 1807 to 1809.
- John Schenck (1750–1823), captain in the Amwell Militia, commander of the Ambush of Geary.

== See also ==
- Amwell Valley
