= Aimwell (disambiguation) =

Aimwell may refer to:

- Aimwell, a racehorse
- Aimwell, Alabama, an unincorporated community
- Aimwell, Louisiana, an unincorporated community

== See also ==
- Amwell (disambiguation)
