= Raritan Township, New Jersey =

Township in Hunterdon County, New Jersey, US

- Township
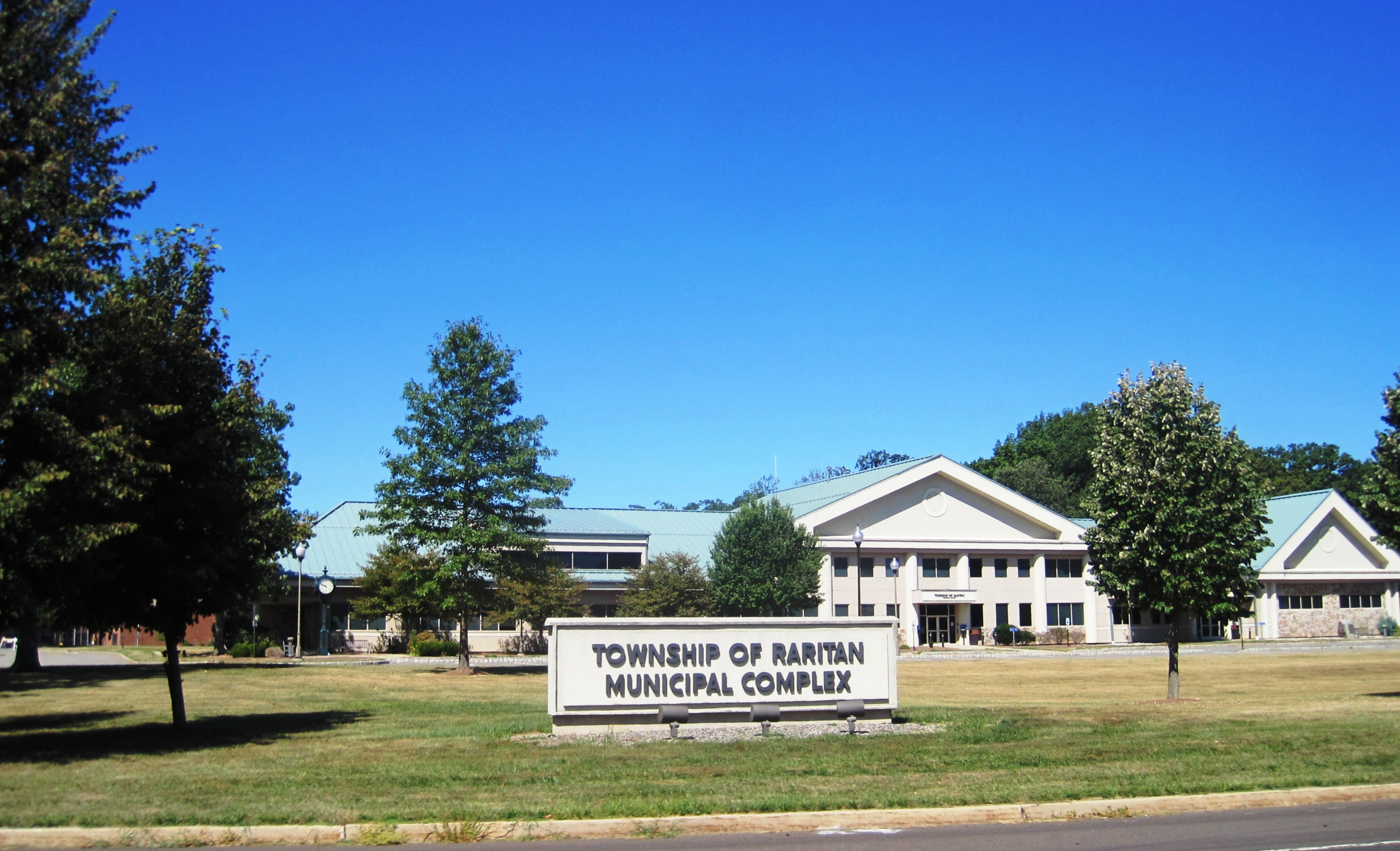
- Raritan Township Municipal Complex

- Seal

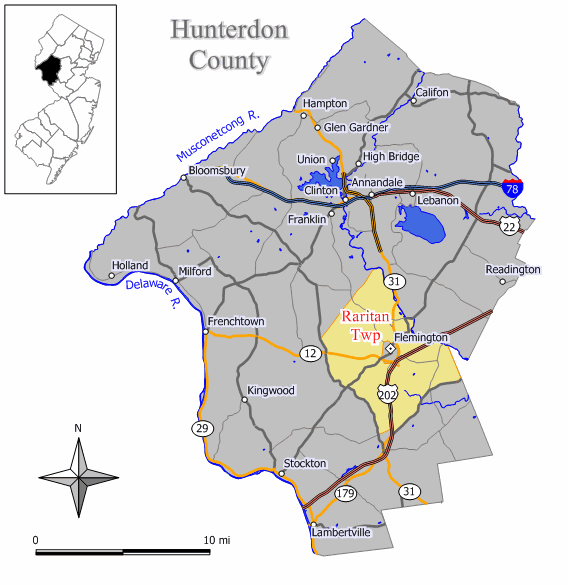
- Location of Raritan Township in Hunterdon County highlighted in yellow (right). Inset map: Location of Hunterdon County in New Jersey highlighted in black (left).

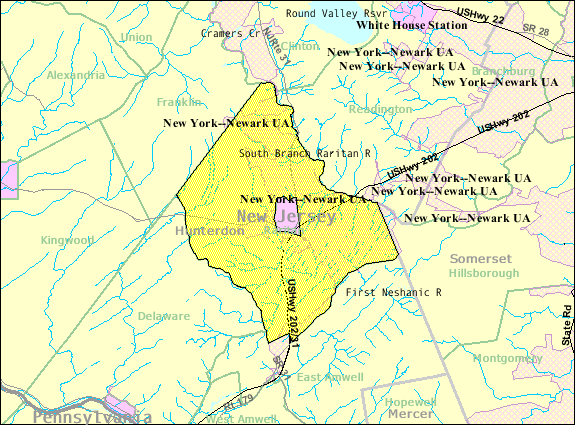
- Census Bureau map of Raritan Township, New Jersey

- Location in Hunterdon County Location in New Jersey Location in the United States
- Coordinates: 40.518846°N 74.936686°W
- Country: United States
- State: New Jersey
- County: Hunterdon
- Incorporated: April 2, 1838

Government
  - Type: Township
  - Body: Township Committee
  - Mayor: Bob King (R, term ends December 31, 2025)
  - Administrator: Karen Gilbert
  - Municipal clerk: Donna Kukla

Area
  - Total: 37.65 sq mi (97.52 km^{2})
  - Land: 37.48 sq mi (97.08 km^{2})
  - Water: 0.17 sq mi (0.44 km^{2}) 0.46%
  - Rank: 63rd of 565 in state 2nd of 26 in county
- Elevation: 564 ft (172 m)

Population (2020)
  - Total: 23,447
  - Estimate (2023): 24,637
  - Rank: 114th of 565 in state 1st of 26 in county
  - Density: 625.6/sq mi (241.5/km^{2})
  - Rank: 426th of 565 in state 13th of 26 in county
- Time zone: UTC−05:00 (Eastern (EST))
  - Summer (DST): UTC−04:00 (Eastern (EDT))
- ZIP Code: 08822 – Flemington
- Area code: 908
- FIPS code: 3401961920
- GNIS feature ID: 0882179
- Website: www.raritantwpnj.gov

Raritan Township is a township in Hunterdon County, in the U.S. state of New Jersey. As of the 2020 United States census, the township's population was 23,447, an increase of 1,262 (+5.7%) from the 2010 census count of 22,185, which in turn reflected an increase of 2,376 (+12.0%) from the 19,809 counted in the 2000 census. The township is located within the heart of the Amwell Valley and Raritan Valley regions, as the South Branch of the Raritan River (along with the Neshanic River) flows through the center of the township. The northwestern portion of the township is located on the Hunterdon Plateau.

Raritan was incorporated as a township by an act of the New Jersey Legislature on April 2, 1838, from portions of the now-defunct Amwell Township. Flemington was formed within the township on March 14, 1870, and became an independent borough on April 7, 1910. Portions of the township were ceded to East Amwell Township in 1854 and 1897.

The township's name is derived from the Raritan tribe, a Native American band of Lenape people that inhabited Central New Jersey. The name of the tribe is said to mean "forked river", "stream overflows" or "point on a tidal river".

== Geography ==
According to the United States Census Bureau, the township had a total area of 37.65 square miles (97.52 km^{2}), including 37.48 square miles (97.08 km^{2}) of land and 0.17 square miles (0.44 km^{2}) of water (0.46%).

Raritan Township completely surrounds Flemington, making it part one of 21 pairs of "doughnut towns" in the state, where one municipality entirely surrounds another. It borders the municipalities of Clinton Township, Delaware Township, East Amwell Township, Franklin Township and Readington Township in Hunterdon County; and Hillsborough Township in Somerset County.

Unincorporated communities, localities and place names located partially or completely within the township include: Cloverhill, Copper Hill, Croton, Flemington Junction, Klinesville, Larisons Corners, Muirhead, Reaville, as well as Bartles Corners, Gary Corner, Mount Carmel, Rockefellows Mills, Thachers Hill and Voorhees Corner.

Raritan Township is located 47.7 miles (76.8 km) east of Allentown, 51.7 miles (83.2 km) north of Philadelphia, and 64.9 miles (104.4 km) southwest of New York City.

== Demographics ==
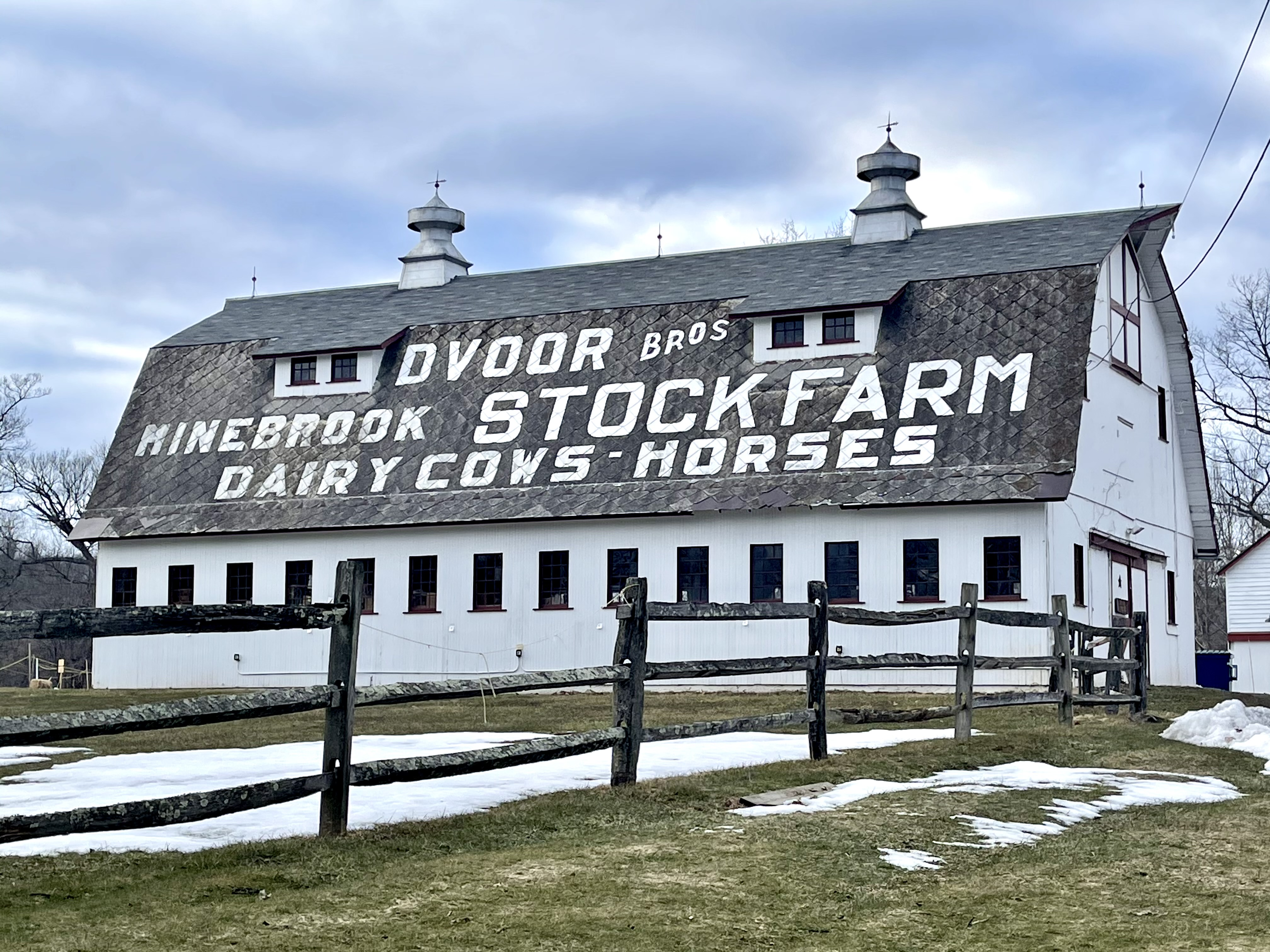
The historic Dvoor Farm, the headquarters for the county-wide Hunterdon Land Trust

Historical population
Census	Pop.	Note	%±
1840	2,510		—
1850	3,070		22.3%
1860	2,270	*	−26.1%
1870	2,242		−1.2%
1880	2,437		8.7%
1890	1,821		−25.3%
1900	1,892		3.9%
1910	1,310		−30.8%
1920	1,677		28.0%
1930	1,823		8.7%
1940	2,158		18.4%
1950	2,814		30.4%
1960	4,545		61.5%
1970	6,934		52.6%
1980	8,292		19.6%
1990	15,616		88.3%
2000	19,809		26.9%
2010	22,185		12.0%
2020	23,447		5.7%
2023 (est.)	24,637		5.1%
Population sources: 1840–1920 1840 1850–1870; 1850 1870 1880–1890; 1890–1910 1910–1930; 1940–2000 2000; 2010 2020 * = Lost territory in previous decade.

=== 2010 census ===
The 2010 United States census counted 22,185 people, 8,056 households, and 6,058 families in the township. The population density was 591.2 per square mile (228.3/km^{2}). There were 8,288 housing units at an average density of 220.9 per square mile (85.3/km^{2}). The racial makeup was 89.57% (19,870) White, 2.07% (459) Black or African American, 0.10% (23) Native American, 5.95% (1,319) Asian, 0.04% (9) Pacific Islander, 0.83% (185) from other races, and 1.44% (320) from two or more races. Hispanic or Latino of any race were 5.13% (1,138) of the population.

Of the 8,056 households, 37.6% had children under the age of 18; 64.9% were married couples living together; 7.7% had a female householder with no husband present and 24.8% were non-families. Of all households, 20.7% were made up of individuals and 8.7% had someone living alone who was 65 years of age or older. The average household size was 2.72 and the average family size was 3.19.

26.2% of the population were under the age of 18, 5.9% from 18 to 24, 22.7% from 25 to 44, 33.2% from 45 to 64, and 12.0% who were 65 years of age or older. The median age was 42.4 years. For every 100 females, the population had 94.8 males. For every 100 females ages 18 and older there were 89.8 males.

The Census Bureau's 2006–2010 American Community Survey showed that (in 2010 inflation-adjusted dollars) median household income was $109,941 (with a margin of error of +/− $7,543) and the median family income was $130,514 (+/− $10,612). Males had a median income of $95,123 (+/− $8,996) versus $62,229 (+/− $3,584) for females. The per capita income for the borough was $48,782 (+/− $2,900). About 2.0% of families and 4.6% of the population were below the poverty line, including 3.6% of those under age 18 and 6.2% of those age 65 or over.

=== 2000 census ===
As of the 2000 United States census there were 19,809 people, 6,939 households, and 5,391 families residing in the township. The population density was 523.5 inhabitants per square mile (202.1/km^{2}). There were 7,094 housing units at an average density of 187.5 per square mile (72.4/km^{2}). The racial makeup of the township was 93.22% White, 1.23% African American, 0.09% Native American, 3.50% Asian, 0.01% Pacific Islander, 0.68% from other races, and 1.27% from two or more races. Hispanic or Latino of any race were 2.79% of the population.

There were 6,939 households, out of which 43.0% had children under the age of 18 living with them, 68.2% were married couples living together, 7.0% had a female householder with no husband present, and 22.3% were non-families. 18.2% of all households were made up of individuals, and 5.6% had someone living alone who was 65 years of age or older. The average household size was 2.81 and the average family size was 3.24.

In the township the population was spread out, with 29.3% under the age of 18, 4.6% from 18 to 24, 32.6% from 25 to 44, 24.7% from 45 to 64, and 8.9% who were 65 years of age or older. The median age was 37 years. For every 100 females, there were 94.1 males. For every 100 females age 18 and over, there were 90.0 males.

The median income for a household in the township was $85,996, and the median income for a family was $96,336. Males had a median income of $69,485 versus $41,911 for females. The per capita income for the township was $38,919. About 1.2% of families and 2.0% of the population were below the poverty line, including 1.6% of those under age 18 and 2.9% of those age 65 or over.

== Government ==
=== Local government ===
Raritan Township is governed under the Township form of government, one of 141 municipalities (of the 564) statewide that use the Township form. The Township Committee is comprised of five members, who are elected directly by the voters at-large in partisan elections to serve three-year terms of office on a staggered basis, with either one or two seats coming up for election each year as part of the November general election in a three-year cycle. At an annual reorganization meeting, the Township Committee selects one of its members to serve as Mayor and another as Deputy Mayor. The mayor presides at Township Committee meetings and votes as a member of the committee, but has no other special powers under the township form of government law. All legislative and executive powers, including the power of appointments, are exercised by the committee as a whole.

As of 2025, the members of the Raritan Township Committee are Mayor Bob King (R, term on committee ends December 31, 2025; term as mayor ends December 31, 2025), Deputy Mayor Bradford Perry (R, term on committee ends 2026; term as deputy mayor ends 2025), Robyn Fatooh (R, 2026), Scott R. MacDade (R, 2025) and Scott Sipos (R, 2027).

In June 2022, Jeff Kuhl resigned from the seat he had held expiring in December 2024 in order to fill a vacant seat on the Hunterdon County Board of County Commissioners. The Township Committee appointed Bob King to fill Kuhl's vacant committee seat; King served on an interim basis until the November 2022 general election, when voters chose King to serve the balance of the term of office.

=== Federal, state and county representation ===
Raritan Township is located in the 7th Congressional District and is part of New Jersey's 16th state legislative district. Prior to the 2010 Census, Raritan Township had been part of the 11th Congressional District, a change made by the New Jersey Redistricting Commission that took effect in January 2013, based on the results of the November 2012 general elections.

For the 119th United States Congress, New Jersey's 7th congressional district is represented by Thomas Kean Jr. (R, Westfield). New Jersey is represented in the United States Senate by Democrats Cory Booker (Newark, term ends 2027) and Andy Kim (Moorestown, term ends 2031).

For the 2026–2027 session, the 16th legislative district of the New Jersey Legislature is represented in the New Jersey Senate by Andrew Zwicker (D, South Brunswick) and in the General Assembly by Mitchelle Drulis (D, East Amwell Township) and Roy Freiman (D, Hillsborough Township).

Hunterdon County is governed by a Board of County Commissioners comprised of five members who are elected at-large on a partisan basis to serve three-year terms of office on a staggered basis, with either one or two seats up for election each year as part of the November general election. At an annual reorganization meeting held each January, the commissioners select one member to serve as the board's Director and another to serve as Deputy Director, each for a one-year term. As of 2025, Hunterdon County's Commissioners are Director John E. Lanza (R; Raritan Township, 2025), Deputy Director Shaun C. Van Doren (R; Tewksbury Township, 2026), Jeff Kuhl (R; Raritan Township, 2027), Zachary T. Rich (R; West Amwell Township, 2025) and Susan Soloway (R; Franklin Township, 2027).

Constitutional officers elected on a countywide basis are Clerk Mary H. Melfi (R; Flemington, 2026), Sheriff Fredrick W. Brown (R; Alexandria Township, 2025) and Surrogate Heidi Rohrbach (R; Lebanon Township, 2028).

=== Politics ===
As of September 2023, there were a total of 19,626 registered voters in Raritan Township, of which 5,600 (28.5%) were registered as Democrats, 7,113 (36.2%) were registered as Republicans and 6,758 (34.4%) were registered as Unaffiliated. There were 78 voters registered as Libertarians or Greens and 77 registered to other parties.

Gubernatorial election results for Raritan Township
Year	Republican		Democratic		Third party(ies)	
Year	No.	%	No.	%	No.	%
2025	6,217	51.01%	5,906	48.45%	66	0.54%
2021	5,887	57.47%	4,281	41.79%	76	0.74%
2017	4,493	58.58%	3,025	39.44%	152	1.98%
2013	5,504	74.07%	1,818	24.47%	109	1.47%
2009	5,440	65.72%	2,173	26.25%	665	8.03%
2005	4,453	61.46%	2,477	34.19%	315	4.35%

In the 2012 presidential election, Republican Mitt Romney received 57.8% of the vote (6,798 cast), ahead of Democrat Barack Obama with 41.2% (4,843 votes), and other candidates with 1.0% (118 votes), among the 11,834 ballots cast by the township's 16,049 registered voters (75 ballots were spoiled), for a turnout of 73.7%. In the 2008 presidential election, Republican John McCain received 54.7% of the vote (6,705 cast), ahead of Democrat Barack Obama with 43.5% (5,339 votes) and other candidates with 1.0% (121 votes), among the 12,261 ballots cast by the township's 15,254 registered voters, for a turnout of 80.4%. In the 2004 presidential election, Republican George W. Bush received 59.7% of the vote (6,727 ballots cast), outpolling Democrat John Kerry with 39.7% (4,470 votes) and other candidates with 0.7% (97 votes), among the 11,265 ballots cast by the township's 13,693 registered voters, for a turnout percentage of 82.3.

United States presidential election results for Raritan Township
Year	Republican		Democratic		Third party(ies)	
Year	No.	%	No.	%	No.	%
2024	7,535	50.68%	7,011	47.15%	323	2.17%
2020	7,625	49.27%	7,590	49.04%	261	1.69%
2016	6,677	52.95%	5,415	42.95%	517	4.10%
2012	6,798	57.81%	4,843	41.19%	118	1.00%
2008	6,705	55.12%	5,339	43.89%	121	0.99%
2004	6,727	59.56%	4,470	39.58%	97	0.86%

In the 2013 gubernatorial election, Republican Chris Christie received 74.1% of the vote (5,504 cast), ahead of Democrat Barbara Buono with 24.5% (1,818 votes), and other candidates with 1.5% (109 votes), among the 7,595 ballots cast by the township's 16,003 registered voters (164 ballots were spoiled), for a turnout of 47.5%. In the 2009 gubernatorial election, Republican Chris Christie received 64.8% of the vote (5,440 ballots cast), ahead of Democrat Jon Corzine with 25.9% (2,173 votes), Independent Chris Daggett with 7.4% (618 votes) and other candidates with 0.6% (47 votes), among the 8,396 ballots cast by the township's 14,991 registered voters, yielding a 56.0% turnout.

United States Senate election results for Raritan Township1
Year	Republican		Democratic		Third party(ies)	
Year	No.	%	No.	%	No.	%
2024	7,259	50.97%	6,642	46.63%	342	2.40%
2018	6,249	54.21%	4,606	39.96%	672	5.83%
2012	6,391	57.14%	4,464	39.91%	329	2.94%
2006	4,089	56.71%	2,852	39.55%	270	3.74%

United States Senate election results for Raritan Township2
Year	Republican		Democratic		Third party(ies)	
Year	No.	%	No.	%	No.	%
2020	7,820	51.34%	7,058	46.34%	354	2.32%
2014	3,512	59.24%	2,294	38.70%	122	2.06%
2013	2,806	60.23%	1,800	38.63%	53	1.14%
2008	6,941	61.07%	4,080	35.90%	345	3.04%

== Education ==
Students in public schools for pre-kindergarten through eighth grade attend the Flemington-Raritan Regional School District, which also serves children from the neighboring community of Flemington. As of the 2023–24 school year, the district, comprised of six schools, had an enrollment of 3,174 students and 335.3 classroom teachers (on an FTE basis), for a student–teacher ratio of 9.5:1. The district is comprised of four PreK/K to 4 elementary schools, one intermediate school for grades 5 and 6 and a middle school for grades 7 and 8. Schools in the district (with 2023–24 enrollment data from the National Center for Education Statistics) are Barley Sheaf School with 363 students in grades K–4 (located in Flemington), Copper Hill School with 602 students in grades PreK–4 (Ringoes), Francis A. Desmares School with 420 students in grades K–4 (Flemington), Robert Hunter School with 394 students in grades K–4 (Flemington), Reading-Fleming Intermediate School with 702 students in grades 5–6 (Flemington) and J. P. Case Middle School with 675 students in grades 7–8 (Flemington). Raritan Township is allocated seven of the nine seats on the regional district's board of education.

Public school students in ninth through twelfth grades attend Hunterdon Central Regional High School, part of the Hunterdon Central Regional High School District, which serves students in central Hunterdon County from Raritan Township and from Delaware Township, East Amwell Township, Flemington and Readington Township. As of the 2023–24 school year, the high school had an enrollment of 2,408 students and 226.7 classroom teachers (on an FTE basis), for a student–teacher ratio of 10.6:1. Seats on the high school district's nine-member board of education are allocated based on the population of the five constituent municipalities who participate in the school district, with four seats allocated to Raritan Township, an increase of one seat based on the results of the 2020 Census.

Eighth grade students from all of Hunterdon County are eligible to apply to attend the high school programs offered by the Hunterdon County Vocational School District, a county-wide vocational school district that offers career and technical education at its campuses in Raritan Township and at programs sited at local high schools, with no tuition charged to students for attendance.

== Transportation ==
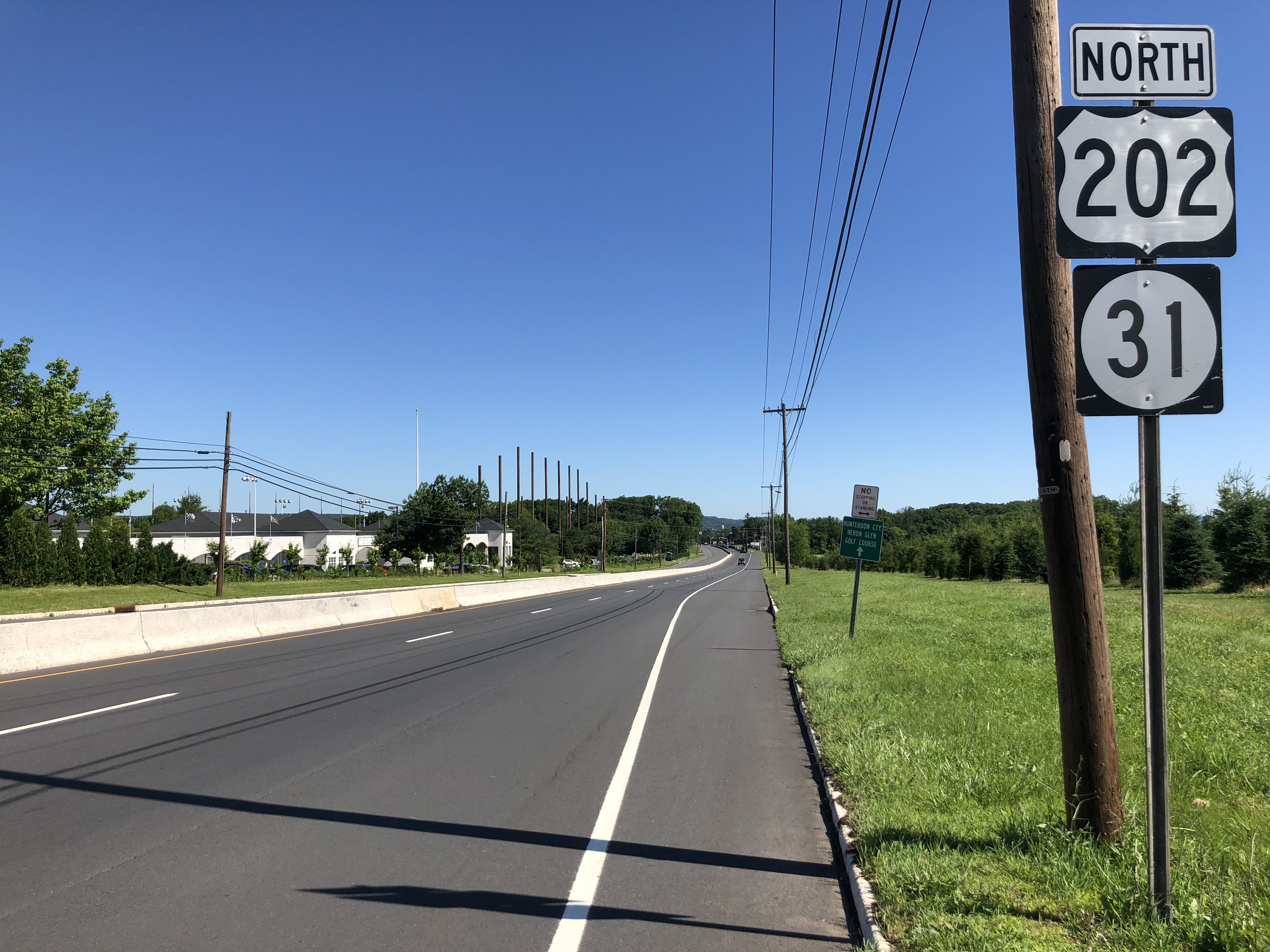
U.S. Route 202 and Route 31 northbound in Raritan Township

As of May 2010, the township had a total of 181.46 miles (292.03 km) of roadways, of which 146.40 miles (235.61 km) were maintained by the municipality, 22.36 miles (35.98 km) by Hunterdon County and 12.70 miles (20.44 km) by the New Jersey Department of Transportation.

Several major roads in Raritan Township. These include Route 12, Route 31 and U.S. Route 202 (the latter two run concurrent for about four miles (6.4 km) in the southern part of the township).

Major county roads that go through the township include CR 514 (which runs along the southeastern border), CR 523 and CR 579 (which runs along the southwestern border).

The closest Interstate highway is Interstate 78 in neighboring Clinton and Franklin Townships.

=== Public transportation ===
The Hunterdon County LINK provide local bus service on Route 14 between Lambertville and Flemington; Route 15 between Flemington and Hampton; Routes 16 / 19 / 21 which operate to / from Flemington; Route 17 / 18 between Milford and Clinton; and Route 23 between Flemington and Bridgewater Commons Mall / Somerville.

=== Rail service ===
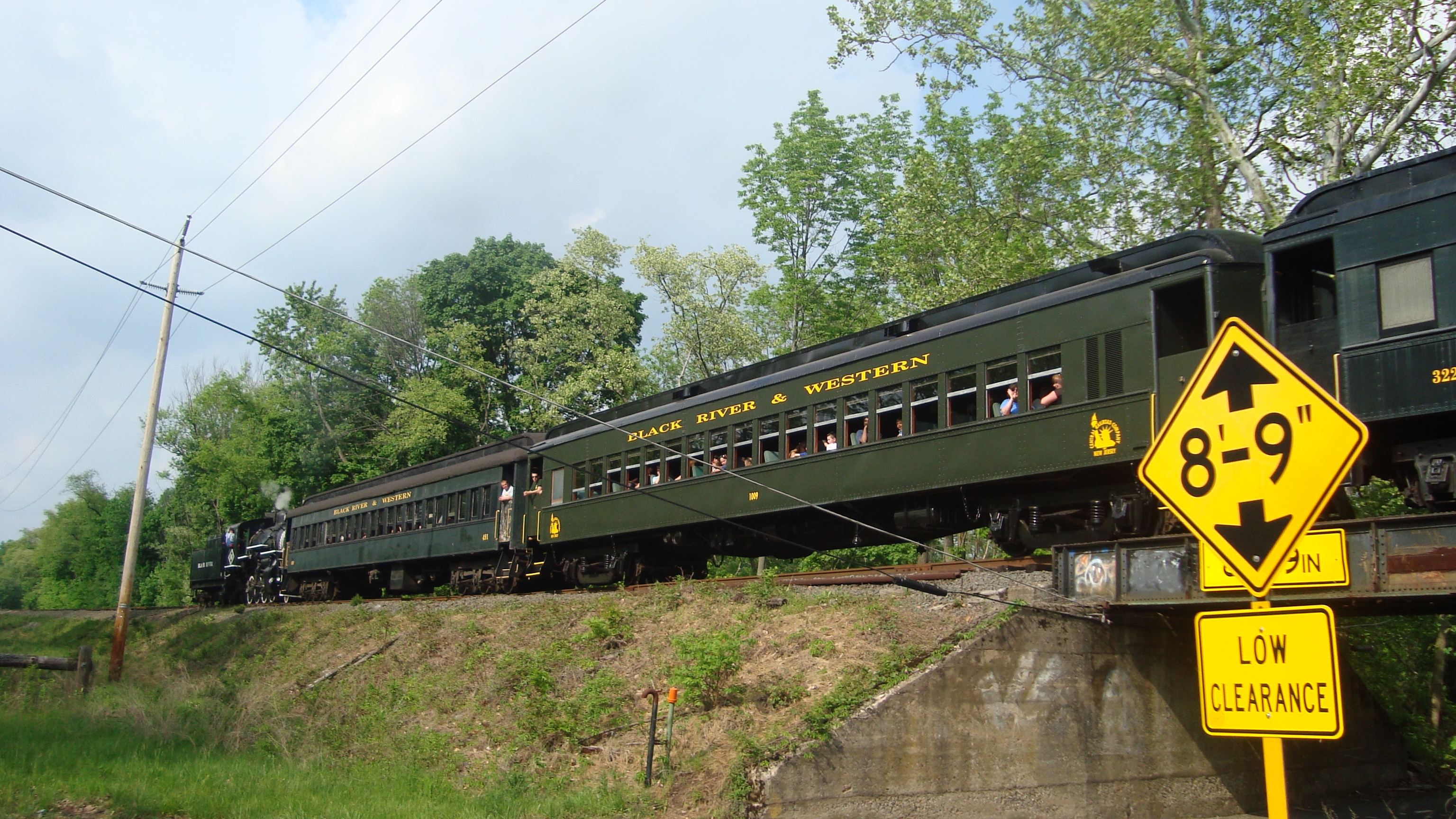
A Black River and Western Railroad excursion train over Dayton Road in Raritan Township

The Black River and Western Railroad is a historic short-line railroad that passes through the township. It operates today as a heritage railway.

The Norfolk Southern Railway's Lehigh Line (formerly the mainline of the Lehigh Valley Railroad), runs through most of the northeast part of Raritan Township close to its northeast boundary.

== Points of interest ==
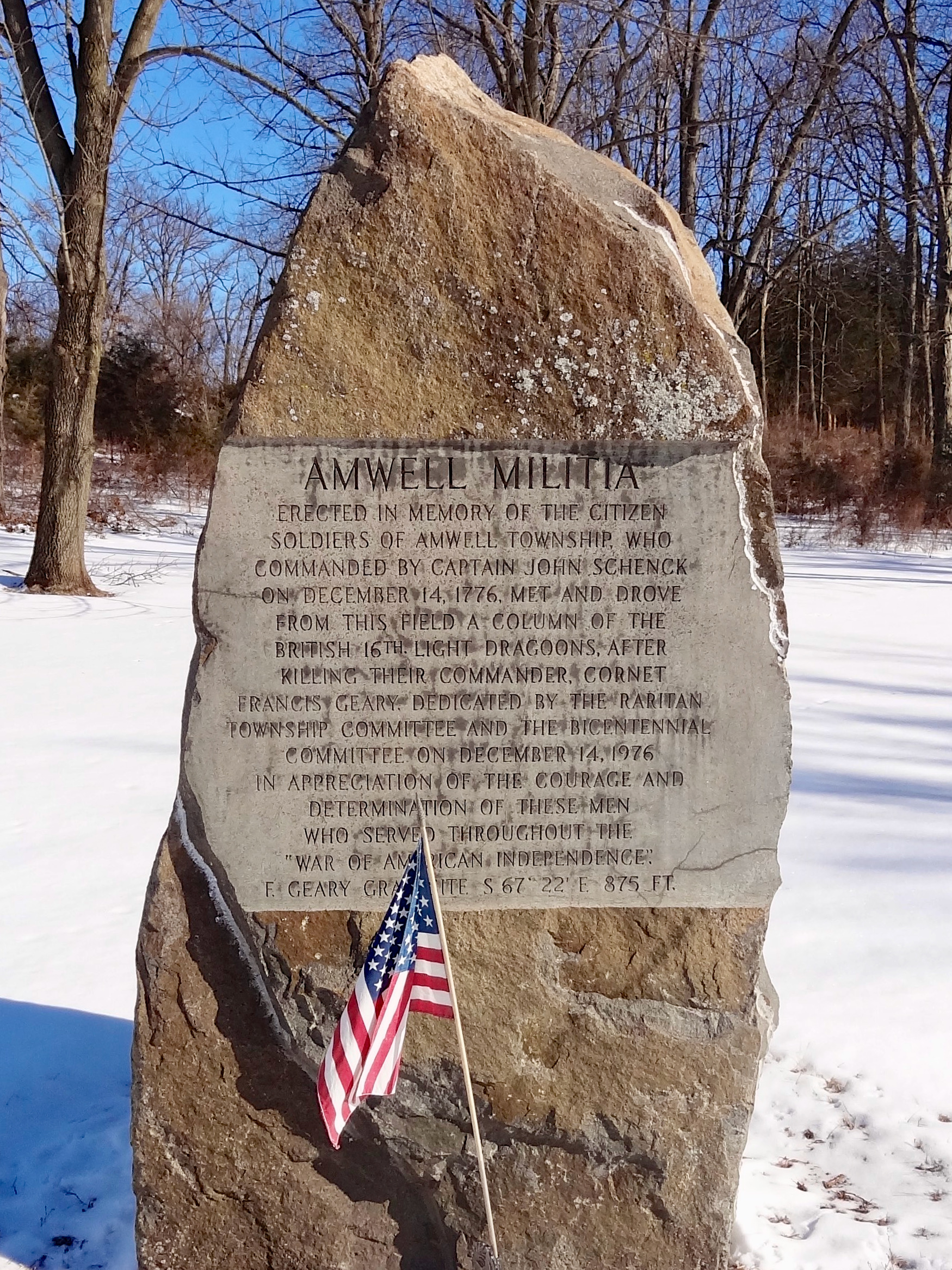
Amwell Militia monument for Captain John Schenck and the Ambush of Geary

On December 14, 1776, during the American Revolutionary War, local militia led by Captain John Schenck ambushed a party of British dragoons returning from a raid on Flemington. The British leader, Cornet Francis Geary, was killed during this skirmish, known as the Ambush of Geary, that took place between Copper Hill and Larison's Corners. On December 14, 1976, as part of the United States Bicentennial, Raritan Township dedicated a monument to the Amwell Militia at the site along US 202 and Route 31 northbound. A memorial monument to Geary is located nearby along with a historical information plaque describing the Amwell Skirmish.

The John Reading Farmstead, built in 1760 for John Reading, former governor of the Province of New Jersey, is listed on the National Register of Historic Places. It is also a contributing property of the Raritan–Readington South Branch Historic District.

== Notable people ==
People who were born in, residents of, or otherwise closely associated with Raritan Township include:

- Marcia A. Karrow (born 1959), member of the New Jersey Senate who served on the Raritan Township Committee, including in 1998 as its mayor
- Orlie Pell (1900–1975), pacifist, philosopher and activist.
- Miles Ross (1827–1903), represented New Jersey's 3rd congressional district in the United States House of Representatives from 1875 to 1883
- Alex Shaffer (born 1993), actor who appeared in the 2011 film Win Win
