= Copper Hill, New Jersey =

Populated place in Hunterdon County, New Jersey, US

- Unincorporated community
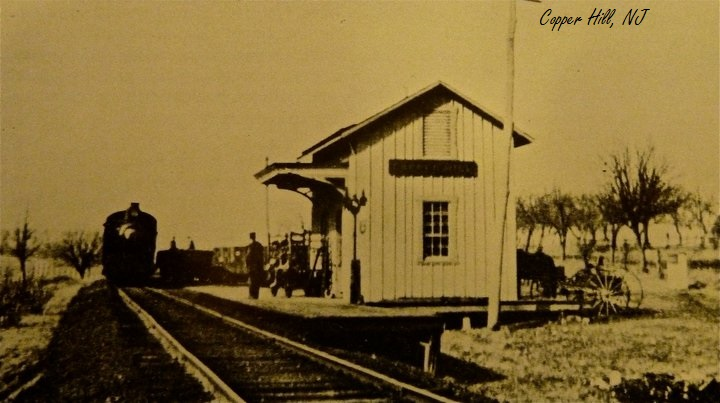
- Former train station

- Location within Hunterdon County, New Jersey Location within New Jersey Location within the United States
- Coordinates: 40°28′30″N 74°51′49″W
- Country: United States
- State: New Jersey
- County: Hunterdon
- Township: Raritan
- Named for: Copper mines
- Elevation: 141 ft (43 m)
- GNIS feature ID: 875648

Copper Hill is an unincorporated community located within the Amwell Valley of Raritan Township in Hunterdon County, New Jersey. It is located between Flemington and Ringoes along U.S. Route 202, New Jersey Route 31 and Copper Hill Road. It was named for the old copper mines in the area.

== History ==
Copper Hill had a post office in 1860. It had a station stop on the Flemington branch of the Belvidere Delaware Railroad. The Black River and Western Railroad now operates on the line.

== Education ==
The Flemington-Raritan Regional School District operates the Copper Hill Elementary School in the community.
