= Colonel John Reading =

Col. John Reading was the first white landowner in Hunterdon County, New Jersey. His son, Governor John Reading was the first native-born Governor of New Jersey, serving in 1747, and again in from September 1757 to June 1758.

Born in England, Colonel Reading emigrated to Gloucester, in what was then the Province of New Jersey in approximately 1684. He was a member of the assembly and was Clerk of Gloucester county from 1688–1702. Along with two others, he was commissioned by the Provincial Council of West Jersey to purchase land from the Native Americans which encompassed 150,000 acres (610 km^{2}) between the Raritan and Delaware rivers. He served as a judge of the Supreme Court of the Province starting in 1712. He died in Amwell Township, New Jersey in 1717.
