= Hunterdon Plateau =

Plateau in New Jersey, US

Coordinates: 40.59857°N 75.10700°W

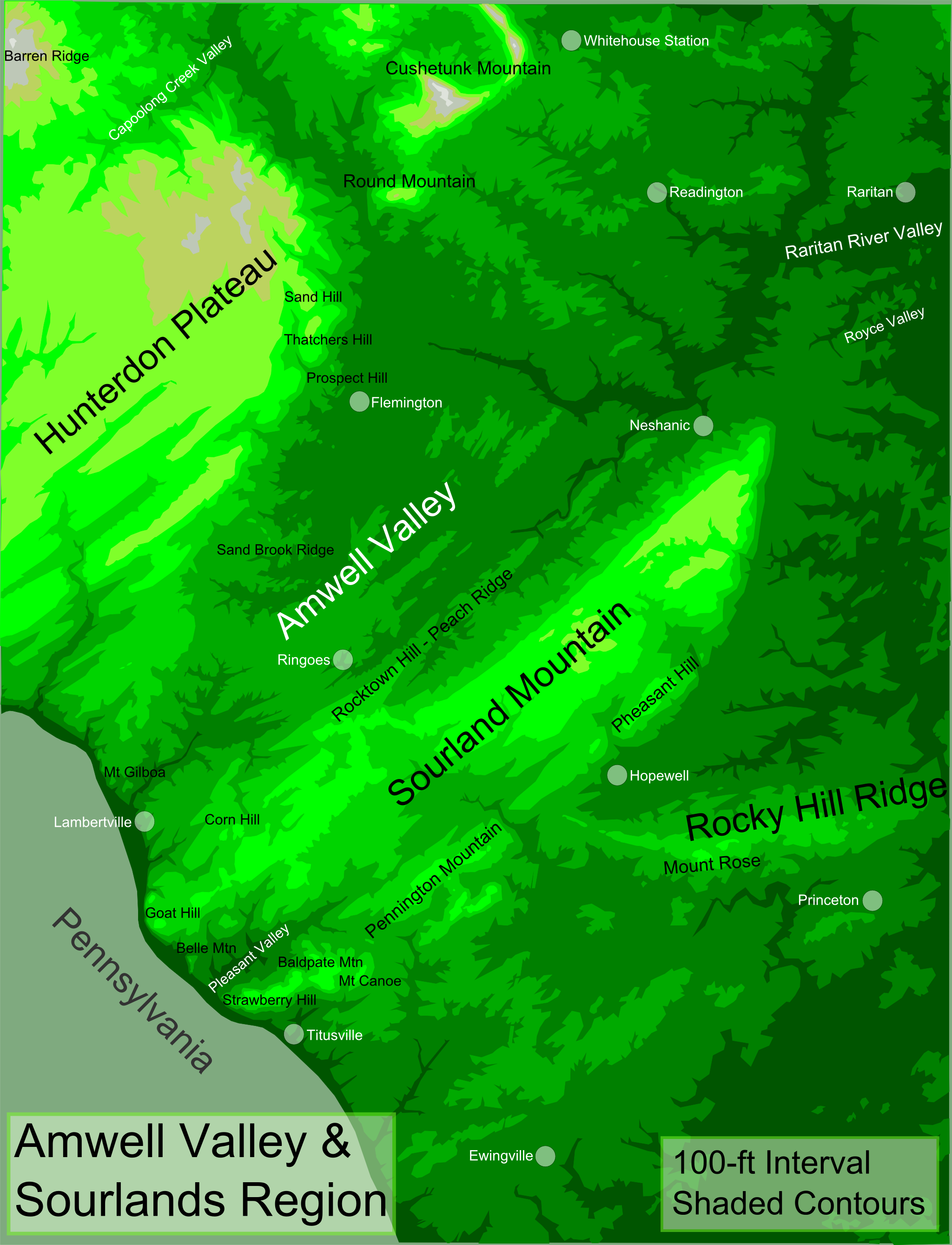
Topographic map depicting the Hunterdon Plateau

Farm in Alexandria Township

Hunterdon Plateau is a plateau in western Hunterdon County, New Jersey. It borders the higher Musconetcong Mountain to the northwest, the Delaware River to the west, Amwell Valley to the south and the lower lying areas of the Newark Basin to the east.

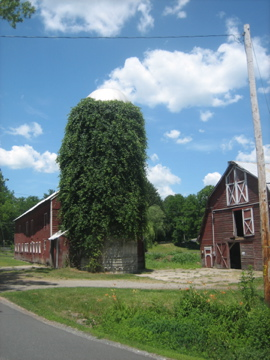
Barn along the Capoolong Trail and Kingstown Road Hunterdon Plateau

The plateau's edge follows a line from Raven Rock to Flemington. From there it follows a curved path west of the South Branch Raritan River until it meets with the Musconetcongs. It is generally unmarred as a plateau, excluding some of the small valleys of tributaries along the Delaware, of Lopatcong Creek and Wickecheoke Creek and Cakepoulin/Capoolong Creek Valley. Other features are Thatcher's Hill and Sand Hill which form southeastward extensions to the plateau due to a valley of Walnut Brook and the curve of the plateau there.

This also occurs between Lockatong Valley and the Delaware River. A small ridge called Barren Ridge runs through Alexandria and Union Township rises slightly above the rest of the plateau. Another feature in Holland Township called Gravel Hill also rises above the rest of the plateau. There are numerous cliffs along the Delaware where the plateau meets it such as Milford Bluffs where prickly pear cacti grow, a rarity in Hunterdon County. The plateau includes the boroughs of Milford and Frenchtown, as well as part of the borough of Flemington and parts of Kingwood, Raritan, Franklin, Union, Bethlehem, Alexandria, Delaware, and Holland townships. Because of the soil types and relatively flat terrain on the plateau, there are still many farms across the area.

== Towns on the plateau ==
Race Street Alley in Frenchtown

- Frenchtown, a borough on the banks of the Delaware named after Swiss French-speaking Paul Henri Mallet-Prevost, with numerous galleries, restaurants and lodgings
- Milford, a borough earlier called Burnt Mills (after a mill burned down in 1769) and Millford, Milford sits along the Delaware with a handful of shops and restaurants
- Pittstown, a small village named after William Pitt, with a spa and a few restaurants and the southern end of the Capoolong Creek Trail

== Sites of interest ==
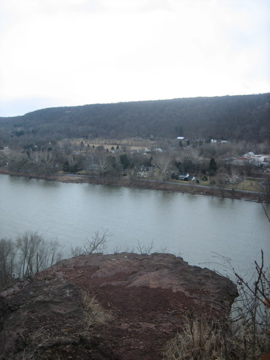
Thomas F. Breden Preserve at Milford Bluffs

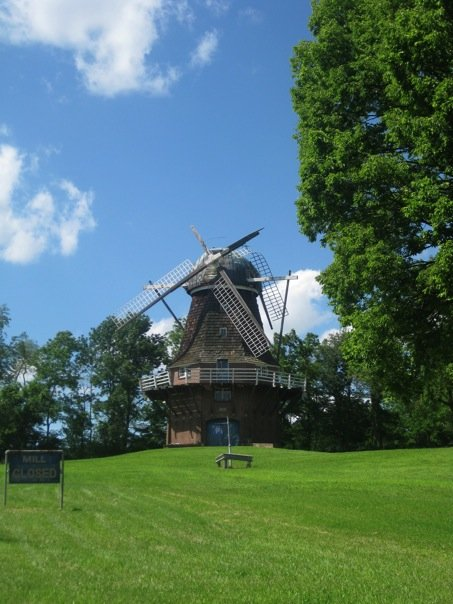
Volendam Windmill

- Bridge Street in Frenchtown
- Capoolong Creek Trail
- D&R Canal Trail
- Milford Bluffs
- Oak Summit School, Kingwood
- Old Stone Church, Kingwood
- Phillips Farm- pick your own
- Schick Reserve
- Ship Inn Brewery
- Volendam Windmill
