= Delaware Township, Hunterdon County, New Jersey =

Township in Hunterdon County, New Jersey, US

Delaware Township, New Jersey
- Township
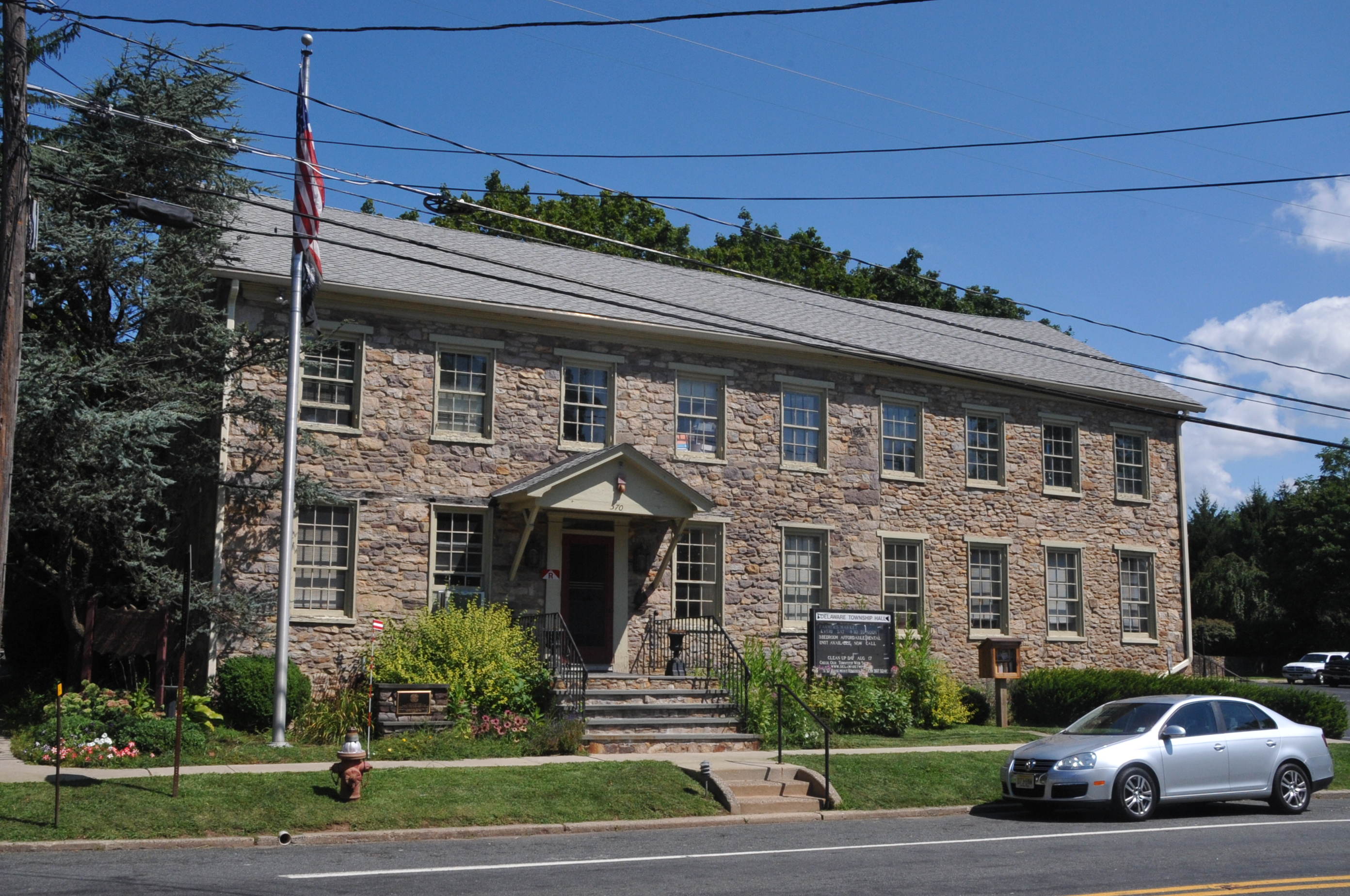
- Township municipal building in Sergeantsville

- Seal

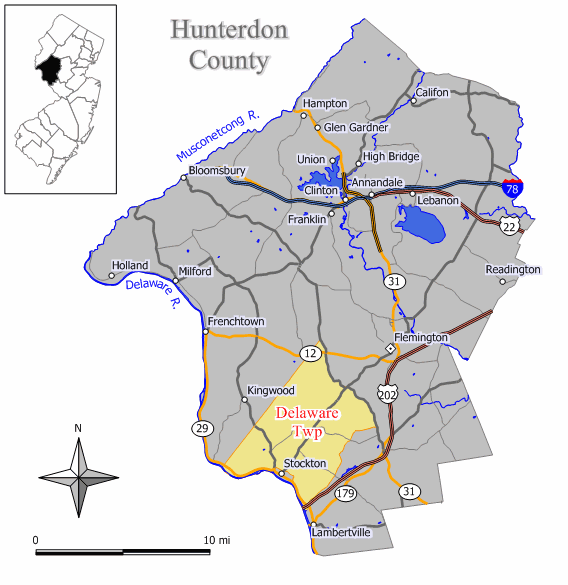
- Location of Delaware Township in Hunterdon County highlighted in yellow (right). Inset map: Location of Hunterdon County in New Jersey highlighted in black (left).

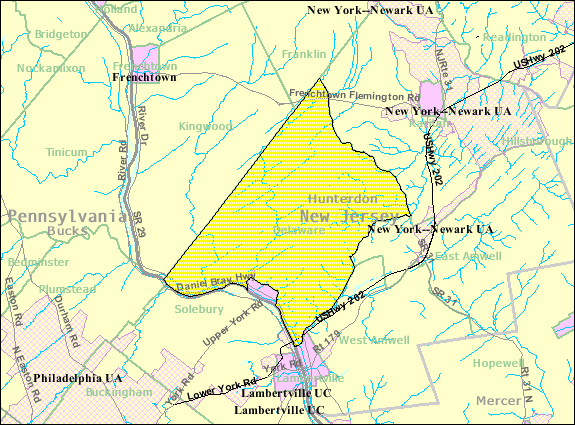
- Census Bureau map of Delaware Township, Hunterdon County, New Jersey

- Location in Hunterdon County Location in New Jersey Location in the United States
- Coordinates: 40.439762°N 74.956329°W
- Country: United States
- State: New Jersey
- County: Hunterdon
- Incorporated: April 2, 1838
- Named for: Delaware River

Government
  - Type: Township
  - Body: Township Committee
  - Mayor: James Waltman (R, term ends December 31, 2026)
  - Municipal clerk: Diana Rumage (acting)

Area
  - Total: 37.05 sq mi (95.95 km^{2})
  - Land: 36.66 sq mi (94.94 km^{2})
  - Water: 0.39 sq mi (1.01 km^{2}) 1.06%
  - Rank: 65th of 565 in state 3rd of 26 in county
- Elevation: 371 ft (113 m)

Population (2020)
  - Total: 4,560
  - Estimate (2023): 4,571
  - Rank: 394th of 565 in state 10th of 26 in county
  - Density: 124.4/sq mi (48.0/km^{2})
  - Rank: 531st of 565 in state 25th of 26 in county
- Time zone: UTC−05:00 (Eastern (EST))
  - Summer (DST): UTC−04:00 (Eastern (EDT))
- ZIP Codes: 08822 – Flemington; 08557 – Sergeantsville; 08559 – Stockton
- Area code: 609, 908
- FIPS code: 3401917170
- GNIS feature ID: 0882182
- Website: www.delawaretwpnj.org

Delaware Township is a township in Hunterdon County, in the U.S. state of New Jersey. Part of the township is on the Hunterdon Plateau, while the southern portions are in the Amwell Valley. As of the 2020 United States census, the township's population was 4,560, a decrease of three people (−0.1%) from the 2010 census count of 4,563, which in turn reflected an increase of 85 (+1.9%) from the 4,478 counted in the 2000 census.

The historic community of Sergeantsville is located within Delaware Township, as well as the unincorporated community of Raven Rock.

== History ==
The township was first settled in the early 18th century by Colonel John Reading (1657–1717), who was instrumental in the creation of Amwell Township in 1708 and also worked for the creation of Hunterdon County in 1714. The Township adjoins the Delaware River on the southwestern portion of Hunterdon County, which provides its name. Constructed in 1872, the state's lone surviving historic covered bridge, Green Sergeant's Covered Bridge, crosses the Wickecheoke Creek between Sergeantsville and Rosemont. The Delaware and Raritan Canal parallels the Delaware River along the southern border of the township. Sergeantsville is at the township's center and includes the municipal building, local public school and Post Office. A "Thanksgiving in the Country" offers a tour of notable homes in Sergeantsville, which raises funds for the Facial Reconstruction Unit of the Children's Hospital of Philadelphia.

Delaware was incorporated as a township by an act of the New Jersey Legislature on April 2, 1838, from a portion of a larger municipality then known as Amwell Township (now defunct). Historian and cartographer John P. Snyder has erroneously stated that a referendum was held on that date, but there was in fact no referendum and the people of Amwell knew nothing about the division until after the Legislature passed the bill. A portion of the township was taken to form Stockton borough (April 14, 1898).

== Geography ==
According to the United States Census Bureau, the township had a total area of 37.05 square miles (95.95 km^{2}), including 36.66 square miles (94.94 km^{2}) of land and 0.39 square miles (1.01 km^{2}) of water (1.06%).

Unincorporated communities, localities and place names located partially or completely within the township include Bowne, Brookville, Dilts Corner, Grover, Headquarters, Locktown, Prallsville, Raven Rock, Rosemont, Sand Brook, Sandy Ridge and Sergeantsville.

The township borders the municipalities of East Amwell Township, Franklin Township, Kingwood Township, Lambertville, Raritan Township, Stockton and West Amwell Township in Hunterdon County; as well as Plumstead Township and Solebury Township in Bucks County across the Delaware River in Pennsylvania.

== Demographics ==
Historical population
Census	Pop.	Note	%±
1840	2,305		—
1850	2,554		10.8%
1860	2,838		11.1%
1870	2,959		4.3%
1880	3,092		4.5%
1890	3,037		−1.8%
1900	1,953	*	−35.7%
1910	1,740		−10.9%
1920	1,705		−2.0%
1930	1,704		−0.1%
1940	1,756		3.1%
1950	2,031		15.7%
1960	2,485		22.4%
1970	3,249		30.7%
1980	3,816		17.5%
1990	4,512		18.2%
2000	4,478		−0.8%
2010	4,563		1.9%
2020	4,560		−0.1%
2023 (est.)	4,571		0.2%
Population sources: 1840–1920 1840 1850–1870; 1850 1870 1880–1890; 1890–1910 1910–1930; 1940–2000 2000; 2010 2020 * = Lost territory in previous decade.

=== 2010 census ===
The 2010 United States census counted 4,563 people, 1,788 households, and 1,348 families in the township. The population density was 124.5 inhabitants per square mile (48.1/km^{2}). There were 1,927 housing units at an average density of 52.6 per square mile (20.3/km^{2}). The racial makeup was 96.45% (4,401) White, 0.66% (30) Black or African American, 0.18% (8) Native American, 0.92% (42) Asian, 0.00% (0) Pacific Islander, 0.50% (23) from other races, and 1.29% (59) from two or more races. Hispanic or Latino of any race were 2.45% (112) of the population.

Of the 1,788 households, 26.6% had children under the age of 18; 66.2% were married couples living together; 6.3% had a female householder with no husband present and 24.6% were non-families. Of all households, 19.0% were made up of individuals and 7.7% had someone living alone who was 65 years of age or older. The average household size was 2.55 and the average family size was 2.93.

20.1% of the population were under the age of 18, 6.1% from 18 to 24, 16.5% from 25 to 44, 41.2% from 45 to 64, and 16.1% who were 65 years of age or older. The median age was 48.6 years. For every 100 females, the population had 96.9 males. For every 100 females ages 18 and older there were 97.2 males.

The Census Bureau's 2006–2010 American Community Survey showed that (in 2010 inflation-adjusted dollars) median household income was $87,100 (with a margin of error of +/− $15,616) and the median family income was $102,481 (+/− $27,024). Males had a median income of $82,586 (+/− $14,105) versus $47,404 (+/− $12,866) for females. The per capita income for the borough was $48,700 (+/− $4,857). About 0.6% of families and 0.6% of the population were below the poverty line, including none of those under age 18 and 0.9% of those age 65 or over.

=== 2000 census ===
As of the 2000 United States census there were 4,478 people, 1,643 households, and 1,302 families residing in the township. The population density was 121.9 inhabitants per square mile (47.1/km^{2}). There were 1,701 housing units at an average density of 46.3 per square mile (17.9/km^{2}). The racial makeup of the township was 97.70% White, 0.40% African American, 0.04% Native American, 1.03% Asian, 0.02% Pacific Islander, 0.25% from other races, and 0.56% from two or more races. Hispanic or Latino of any race were 1.14% of the population.

There were 1,643 households, out of which 33.8% had children under the age of 18 living with them, 71.3% were married couples living together, 4.9% had a female householder with no husband present, and 20.7% were non-families. 14.8% of all households were made up of individuals, and 6.0% had someone living alone who was 65 years of age or older. The average household size was 2.72 and the average family size was 3.06.

In the township the population was spread out, with 23.4% under the age of 18, 5.9% from 18 to 24, 26.5% from 25 to 44, 32.3% from 45 to 64, and 11.8% who were 65 years of age or older. The median age was 42 years. For every 100 females, there were 98.8 males. For every 100 females age 18 and over, there were 100.3 males.

The median income for a household in the township was $80,756, and the median income for a family was $90,842. Males had a median income of $61,701 versus $48,780 for females. The per capita income for the township was $38,285. 3.4% of the population and 2.3% of families were below the poverty line. Out of the total people living in poverty, 1.2% are under the age of 18 and 12.2% are 65 or older.

== Government ==
=== Local government ===
Delaware Township is governed under the Township form of New Jersey municipal government, one of 141 municipalities (of the 564) statewide that use this form, the second-most commonly used form of government in the state. The Township Committee is comprised of five members, who are elected directly by the voters at-large in partisan elections to serve three-year terms of office on a staggered basis, with either one or two seats coming up for election each year as part of the November general election in a three-year cycle. At an annual reorganization meeting, the Township Committee selects one of its members to serve as Mayor and another as Deputy Mayor.

As of 2023, members of the Delaware Township Committee are Mayor Charles Herman (R, term on committee and as mayor ends December 31, 2023), Deputy Mayor Chad Bower (R, term on committee ends 2024; term as deputy mayor ends 2023), Susan D. Lockwood (D, 2023), Joseph Eric Vocke (R, 2025) and James Waltman (R, 2024).

=== Federal, state and county representation ===
Delaware Township is located in the 7th Congressional District and is part of New Jersey's 15th state legislative district.

For the 119th United States Congress, New Jersey's 7th congressional district is represented by Thomas Kean Jr. (R, Westfield). New Jersey is represented in the United States Senate by Democrats Cory Booker (Newark, term ends 2027) and Andy Kim (Moorestown, term ends 2031).

For the 2026–2027 session, the 15th legislative district of the New Jersey Legislature is represented in the State Senate by Shirley Turner (D, Lawrence Township) and in the General Assembly by Verlina Reynolds-Jackson (D, Trenton) and Anthony Verrelli (D, Hopewell Township).

Hunterdon County is governed by a Board of County Commissioners comprised of five members who are elected at-large on a partisan basis to serve three-year terms of office on a staggered basis, with either one or two seats up for election each year as part of the November general election. At an annual reorganization meeting held each January, the commissioners select one member to serve as the board's Director and another to serve as Deputy Director, each for a one-year term. As of 2025, Hunterdon County's Commissioners are Director John E. Lanza (R; Raritan Township, 2025), Deputy Director Shaun C. Van Doren (R; Tewksbury Township, 2026), Jeff Kuhl (R; Raritan Township, 2027), Zachary T. Rich (R; West Amwell Township, 2025) and Susan Soloway (R; Franklin Township, 2027).

Constitutional officers elected on a countywide basis are Clerk Mary H. Melfi (R; Flemington, 2026), Sheriff Fredrick W. Brown (R; Alexandria Township, 2025) and Surrogate Heidi Rohrbach (R; Lebanon Township, 2028).

=== Politics ===
As of March 2011, there were a total of 3,558 registered voters in Delaware Township, of which 811 (22.8%) were registered as Democrats, 1,512 (42.5%) were registered as Republicans and 1,232 (34.6%) were registered as Unaffiliated. There were 3 voters registered as Libertarians or Greens.

Gubernatorial election results for Delaware Township
Year	Republican		Democratic		Third party(ies)	
Year	No.	%	No.	%	No.	%
2025	1,341	48.82%	1,394	50.75%	12	0.44%
2021	1,347	55.78%	1,050	43.48%	18	0.75%
2017	1,149	55.61%	887	42.93%	30	1.45%
2013	1,412	70.99%	535	26.90%	42	2.11%
2009	1,382	61.42%	667	29.64%	201	8.93%
2005	1,214	57.10%	820	38.57%	92	4.33%

In the 2012 presidential election, Republican Mitt Romney received 57.4% of the vote (1,618 cast), ahead of Democrat Barack Obama with 41.4% (1,168 votes), and other candidates with 1.2% (33 votes), among the 2,840 ballots cast by the township's 3,724 registered voters (21 ballots were spoiled), for a turnout of 76.3%. In the 2008 presidential election, Republican John McCain received 54.0% of the vote (1,579 cast), ahead of Democrat Barack Obama with 43.8% (1,279 votes) and other candidates with 1.5% (43 votes), among the 2,922 ballots cast by the township's 3,599 registered voters, for a turnout of 81.2%. In the 2004 presidential election, Republican George W. Bush received 57.3% of the vote (1,671 ballots cast), outpolling Democrat John Kerry with 42.2% (1,229 votes) and other candidates with 1.0% (35 votes), among the 2,915 ballots cast by the township's 3,459 registered voters, for a turnout percentage of 84.3.

United States presidential election results for Delaware Township
Year	Republican		Democratic		Third party(ies)	
Year	No.	%	No.	%	No.	%
2024	1,553	48.88%	1,571	49.45%	53	1.67%
2020	1,650	49.67%	1,617	48.68%	55	1.66%
2016	1,539	53.18%	1,249	43.16%	106	3.66%
2012	1,618	57.40%	1,168	41.43%	33	1.17%
2008	1,579	54.43%	1,279	44.09%	43	1.48%
2004	1,671	56.93%	1,229	41.87%	35	1.19%

In the 2013 gubernatorial election, Republican Chris Christie received 71.0% of the vote (1,412 cast), ahead of Democrat Barbara Buono with 26.9% (535 votes), and other candidates with 2.1% (42 votes), among the 2,021 ballots cast by the township's 3,726 registered voters (32 ballots were spoiled), for a turnout of 54.2%. In the 2009 gubernatorial election, Republican Chris Christie received 60.7% of the vote (1,382 ballots cast), ahead of Democrat Jon Corzine with 29.3% (667 votes), Independent Chris Daggett with 7.9% (179 votes) and other candidates with 1.0% (22 votes), among the 2,277 ballots cast by the township's 3,546 registered voters, yielding a 64.2% turnout.

United States Senate election results for Delaware Township1
Year	Republican		Democratic		Third party(ies)	
Year	No.	%	No.	%	No.	%
2024	1,507	48.80%	1,529	49.51%	52	1.68%
2018	1,474	54.49%	1,144	42.29%	87	3.22%
2012	1,511	56.17%	1,088	40.45%	91	3.38%
2006	1,111	54.25%	859	41.94%	78	3.81%

United States Senate election results for Delaware Township2
Year	Republican		Democratic		Third party(ies)	
Year	No.	%	No.	%	No.	%
2020	1,686	51.48%	1,508	46.05%	81	2.47%
2014	963	56.51%	707	41.49%	34	2.00%
2013	802	58.71%	549	40.19%	15	1.10%
2008	1,727	62.87%	944	34.36%	76	2.77%

== Education ==
The Delaware Township School District serves students in pre-kindergarten through eighth grade at Delaware Township School. As of the 2024–25 school year, the district, comprised of one school, had an enrollment of 405 students and 45.4 classroom teachers (on an FTE basis), for a student–teacher ratio of 8.9:1. The school is located on a site covering 26 acres (11 ha) adjacent to the community of Sergeantsville and 3 miles (4.8 km) from the Delaware River.

Students in ninth through twelfth grades attend Hunterdon Central High School, part of the Hunterdon Central Regional High School District, which serves students in central Hunterdon County from Delaware Township, East Amwell Township, Flemington Borough, Raritan Township and Readington Township. As of the 2024–25 school year, the high school had an enrollment of 2,238 students and 217.2 classroom teachers (on an FTE basis), for a student–teacher ratio of 10.3:1. Seats on the high school district's nine-member board of education are allocated based in the population of the five constituent municipalities who participate in the school district, with one seat allocated to Delaware Township.

Eighth grade students from all of Hunterdon County are eligible to apply to attend the high school programs offered by the Hunterdon County Vocational School District, a county-wide vocational school district that offers career and technical education at its campuses in Raritan Township and at programs sited at local high schools, with no tuition charged to students for attendance.

== Transportation ==
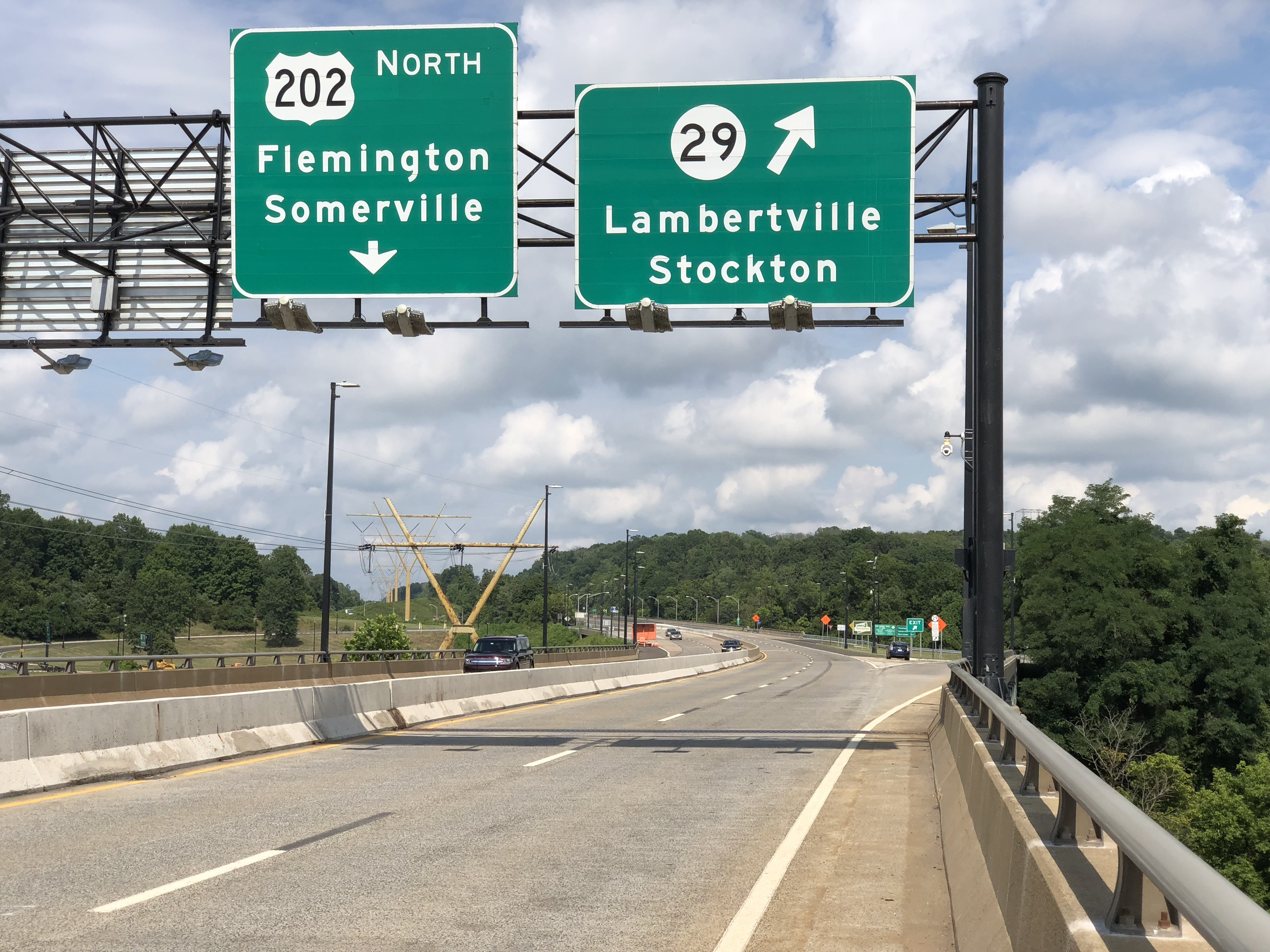
U.S. Route 202 northbound at Route 29 in Delaware Township

As of May 2010, the township had a total of 97.38 miles (156.72 km) of roadways, of which 70.38 miles (113.27 km) were maintained by the municipality, 20.71 miles (33.33 km) by Hunterdon County, 5.94 miles (9.56 km) by the New Jersey Department of Transportation and 0.35 miles (0.56 km) by the Delaware River Joint Toll Bridge Commission.

State and U.S. routes that pass through include Route 12, Route 29 and U.S. Route 202 (including part of the New Hope-Lambertville Toll Bridge).

County routes that traverse the municipality are CR 519, CR 523, CR 579 (which runs along the border between Raritan) and CR 604. The historic Green Sergeant's Covered Bridge, the last historic covered bridge in New Jersey, is located within the township along CR 604.

Interstate 78 is outside the township in neighboring Franklin Township.

== Notable people ==
People who were born in, residents of, or otherwise closely associated with Delaware Township include:

- Willard H. Allen (1893–1957), poultry scientist who served as New Jersey secretary of agriculture from 1938 to 1956
- George Newton Best (1846–1926), bryologist, expert on moss taxonomy and second president of the Sullivant Moss Society
- William Cotton (1880–1958), artist and playwright
- Alan B. Handler (1931–2024), New Jersey Supreme Court Justice, 1977–1999
- Chet Huntley (1911–1974), radio and television journalist and co-anchor of the Huntley-Brinkley Report on NBC who co-owned a cattle farm which he used as a weekend retreat
- Barbara McConnell (1935–2016), former member of the New Jersey General Assembly and former New Jersey Commissioner of Commerce and Economic Development
- Lansing Pilch, retired United States Air Force major general
- Gabby Provenzano (born 1999), professional soccer player who plays as a midfielder or center back for Portland Thorns FC in the National Women's Soccer League
- John Schoenherr (1935–2010), award-winning illustrator
- Glenway Wescott (1901–1987), novelist and essayist
- Lloyd Wescott (1907–1990), agriculturalist, civil servant and brother of Glenway Wescott
- Paul Whiteman (1890–1967), big band leader who resided at Walking Horse Farm in Rosemont from 1938 to 1959, before moving to New Hope, Pennsylvania for his remaining years
- Dick Zimmer (born 1944), former member of the United States House of Representatives
