= Volendam Windmill =

Windmill in New Jersey, United States

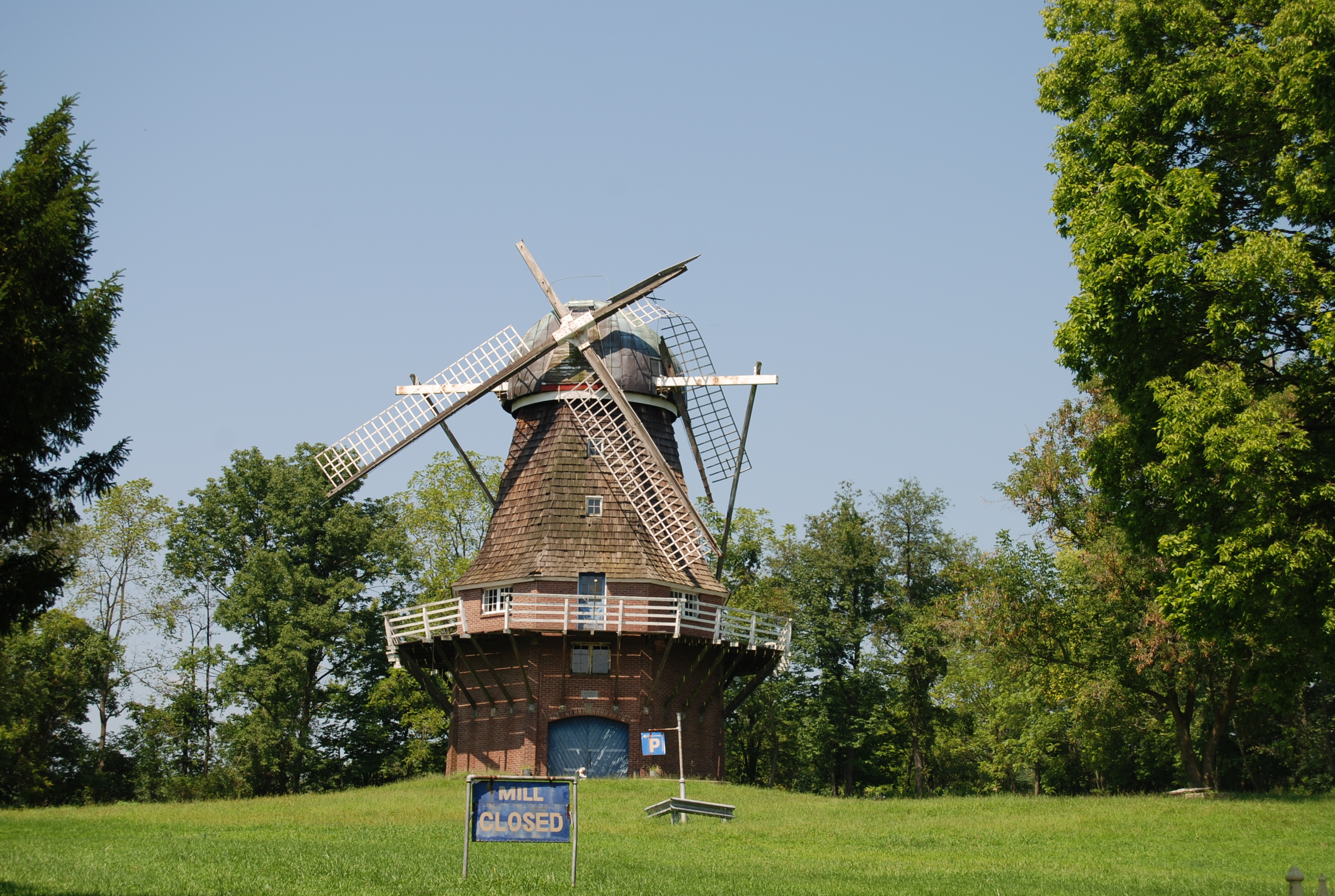
- Photo from Adamic Hill Rd on August 15, 2009
- Interactive map of Volendam Windmill

Origin
- Mill name: Volendam Mill
- Mill location: Holland Township, New Jersey, USA
- Coordinates: 40.5966°N 75.1639°W

Information
- Purpose: Corn mill
- Type: Smock mill
- Storeys: Two-story smock
- Base storeys: Three-story base
- Smock sides: Eight sides
- No. of sails: Four sails
- Type of sails: Common sails
- Winding: Tailpole

Volendam Windmill is a smock mill located on Adamic Hill Road in Holland Township, New Jersey, United States.

The windmill was designed and built in 1965 by Paul and May Jorgenson, using windmills they had seen in Denmark and The Netherlands as models. The Volendam Windmill Museum is a working mill driven by wind, used for grinding raw grain into flour. The 60-foot structure is seven stories high with sail arms 68 feet from tip to tip. In 2007, two of the sail arms of the windmill were damaged in a windstorm. As of 2021, the county's website shows that the museum is closed.

== See also ==
- Hunterdon Plateau
