= The Hopewell Project =

Coordinates: 40.404533°N 74.815570°W

The Hopewell Project is a solar-powered residence in North America that generates hydrogen for subsequent reconversion into electricity, meeting all of the home's power needs, including heating and cooling, through renewable solar energy. The solar/hydrogen-powered home is located northwest of Hopewell, New Jersey in East Amwell Township, cost $500,000 and was dedicated on October 20, 2006.

== Project overview ==
The Hopewell Project is an organization of private citizens advocating the adoption of renewable energy technologies. The Hopewell Project does not advocate a particular renewable energy technology.

The Solar-Hydrogen Residence that has been set up and is operating in Hopewell, New Jersey combines photovoltaic solar, electrolyzer, fuel cell, computer software, and other technologies that have been carefully selected to work in concert to make the renewable energy installation 100% reliant on renewable energy sources for the home's energy needs, negating the need for utility delivered non-renewable energy sources.

The New Jersey project, which opened in October 2006 after four years of planning and building, cost around $500,000, some $225,000 of which was provided by the New Jersey Board of Public Utilities. The project also got equipment and expertise from a number of commercial sponsors including Exide, which donated some $50,000 worth of batteries, and Swagelok, an Ohio company that provided stainless steel piping costing around $28,000. Michael Strizki, the project promoter, contributed about $100,000 of his own money.

In the summer, the solar panels generate 60% more electricity than the super-insulated house needs. The excess is stored in the form of hydrogen which is used in the winter—when the solar panels can't meet all the domestic demand—to make electricity in the fuel cell.

== Future developments ==
The Hopewell Project is currently developing a complete solar-hydrogen-fuel cell turnkey system that could be installed on an average home. The target is to bring the system to market by 2008, for the approximate price of a mid-range automobile (considerably lower than the price for the initial system).

== See also ==
- Hydrogen station
