= East Amwell Township, New Jersey =

Township in Hunterdon County, New Jersey, US

- Township
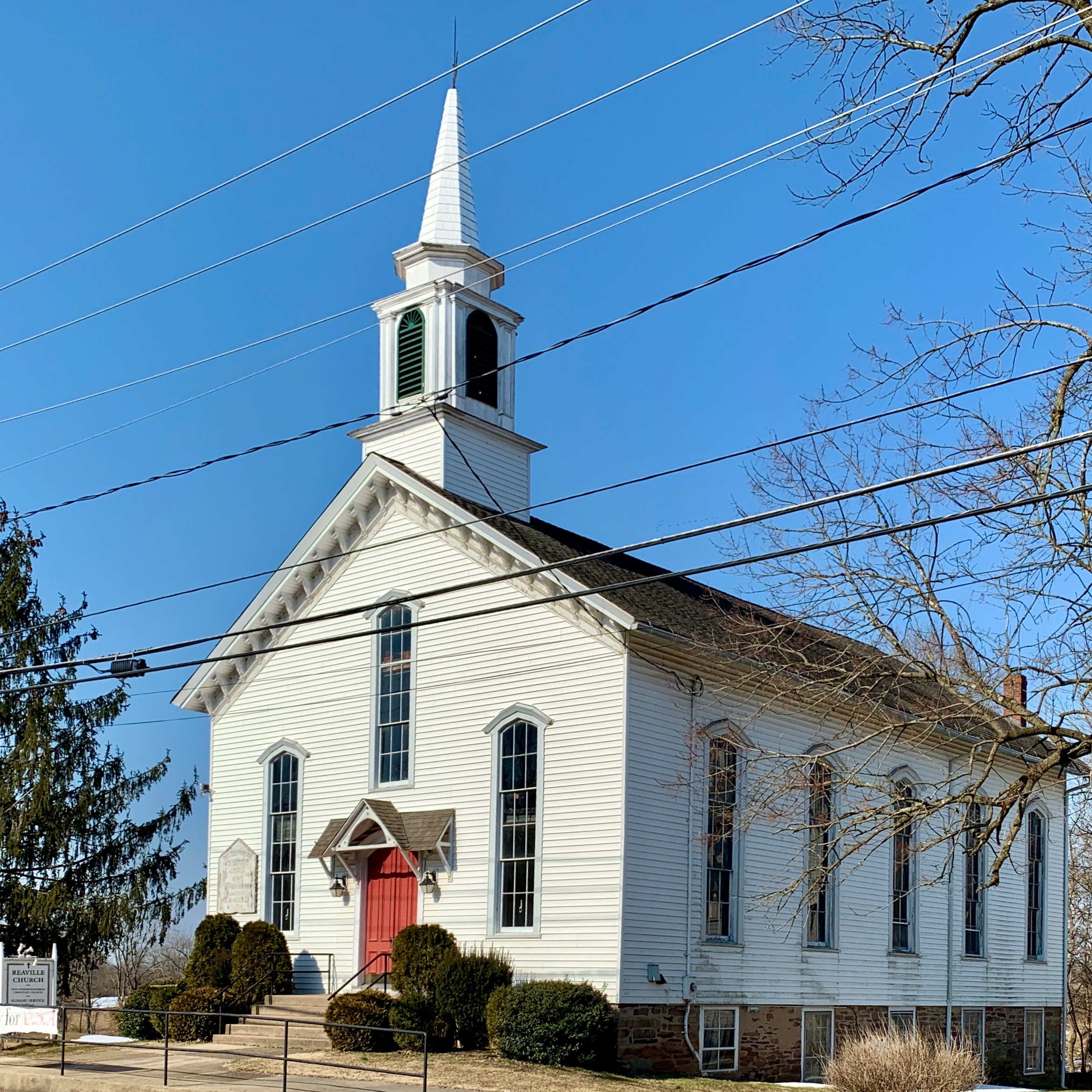
- Reaville Church

- Seal

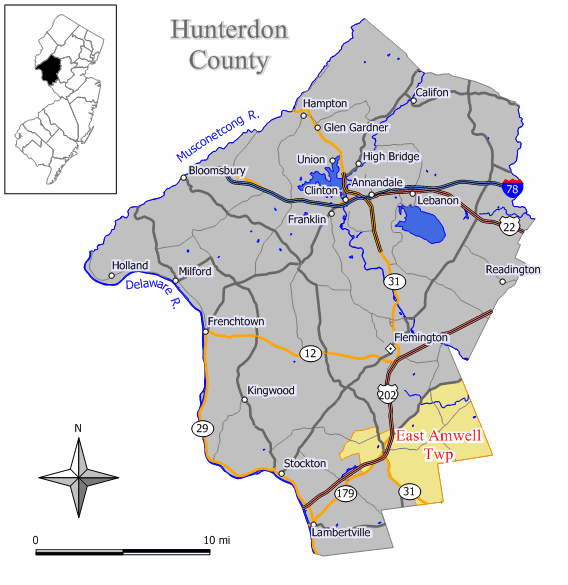
- Location of East Amwell Township in Hunterdon County highlighted in yellow (right). Inset map: Location of Hunterdon County in New Jersey highlighted in black (left).

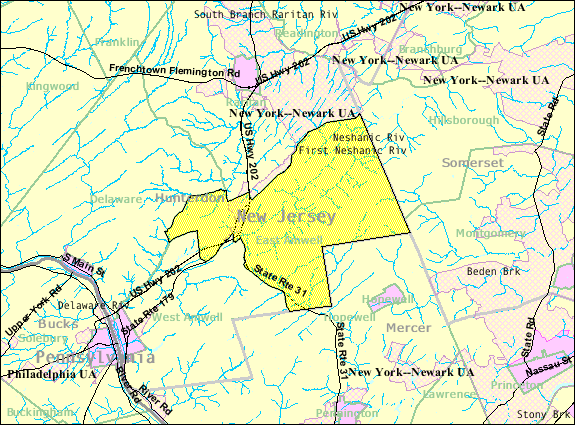
- Census Bureau map of East Amwell Township, New Jersey

- Location in Hunterdon County Location in New Jersey Location in the United States
- Coordinates: 40.434992°N 74.82303°W
- Country: United States
- State: New Jersey
- County: Hunterdon
- Incorporated: April 6, 1846
- Named after: Amwell Township / Great and Little Amwell, Hertfordshire

Government
  - Type: Township (New Jersey)
  - Body: Township Committee
  - Mayor: Michael Dendis (D, term ends December 31, 2026)
  - Municipal clerk: Linda Giliberti

Area
  - Total: 28.56 sq mi (73.96 km^{2})
  - Land: 28.46 sq mi (73.70 km^{2})
  - Water: 0.10 sq mi (0.27 km^{2}) 0.36%
  - Rank: 94th of 565 in state 8th of 26 in county
- Elevation: 203 ft (62 m)

Population (2020)
  - Total: 3,917
  - Estimate (2023): 3,937
  - Rank: 416th of 565 in state 12th of 26 in county
  - Density: 137.7/sq mi (53.2/km^{2})
  - Rank: 527th of 565 in state 24th of 26 in county
- Time zone: UTC−05:00 (Eastern (EST))
  - Summer (DST): UTC−04:00 (Eastern (EDT))
- ZIP Code: 08551 – Ringoes; 08559 – Stockton
- Area code: 609 and 908
- FIPS code: 3401918820
- GNIS feature ID: 0882180
- Website: www.eastamwelltownship.com

East Amwell Township is a township in Hunterdon County, in the U.S. state of New Jersey. As of the 2020 United States census, the township's population was 3,917, a decrease of 96 (−2.4%) from the 2010 census count of 4,013, which in turn reflected a decline of 442 (−9.9%) from the 4,455 counted in the 2000 census.

East Amwell Township is located in the southeastern corner of Hunterdon County where it borders both Somerset and Mercer counties, within the heart of the Amwell Valley and Raritan Valley regions. It includes the unincorporated community of Ringoes, the oldest known settlement in Hunterdon County, as well as the communities of Larison's Corner, Weert's Corner and part of Reaville.

== History ==
Amwell Township was established by a royal patent from Queen Anne in 1708. Its territory comprised 200 square miles (520 km^{2}) and included present day Delaware Township, Raritan Township, Readington Township, East Amwell Township and West Amwell Township and portions of Clinton, Lebanon and Tewksbury Townships. Both East Amwell Township and West Amwell Township were formed on April 6, 1846, when Amwell Township was split in two. Territory was gained in 1854 from Delaware Township, Raritan Township and West Amwell Township, and again from those same three townships in 1897. The township was named for Amwell Township, which in turn was named for Great Amwell/Little Amwell, Hertfordshire in England.

East Amwell was the location of the Lindbergh kidnapping, in which Charles Augustus Lindbergh III, was abducted from the estate owned by Charles Lindbergh and Anne Morrow Lindbergh, and was later found dead nearby.

== Geography ==
According to the United States Census Bureau, the township had a total area of 28.56 square miles (73.96 km^{2}), including 28.46 square miles (73.70 km^{2}) of land and 0.10 square miles (0.27 km^{2}) of water (0.36%).

The northern areas of East Amwell are in the Amwell Valley, while the southern sections are in The Sourlands region. The township borders Delaware Township, Raritan Township and West Amwell Township in Hunterdon County; Hopewell Township in Mercer County; and Hillsborough Township and Montgomery Township in Somerset County.

Unincorporated communities, localities and place names located partially or completely within the township include Amwell, Boss Road, Bowne, Buttonwood Corners, Cloverhill, Furmans Corner, Larisons Corners, Linvale (historically known as New Market), Reaville, Rileyville, Ringoes, Rocktown, Snydertown, Union, Unionville, Venliews Corners and Wertsville.

== Demographics ==
Historical population
Census	Pop.	Note	%±
1850	1,330		—
1860	1,865		40.2%
1870	1,802		−3.4%
1880	1,696		−5.9%
1890	1,375		−18.9%
1900	1,327		−3.5%
1910	1,203		−9.3%
1920	1,102		−8.4%
1930	1,210		9.8%
1940	1,218		0.7%
1950	1,525		25.2%
1960	1,981		29.9%
1970	2,568		29.6%
1980	3,468		35.0%
1990	4,332		24.9%
2000	4,455		2.8%
2010	4,013		−9.9%
2020	3,917		−2.4%
2023 (est.)	3,937		0.5%
Population sources: 1850–1920; 1850–1870 1850 1870; 1880–1890 1890–1910; 1910–1930 1940–2000; 2000 2010 2020

=== 2010 census ===
The 2010 United States census counted 4,013 people, 1,518 households, and 1,155 families in the township. The population density was 141.0 per square mile (54.4/km^{2}). There were 1,580 housing units at an average density of 55.5 per square mile (21.4/km^{2}). The racial makeup was 95.81% (3,845) White, 1.25% (50) Black or African American, 0.05% (2) Native American, 1.42% (57) Asian, 0.00% (0) Pacific Islander, 0.67% (27) from other races, and 0.80% (32) from two or more races. Hispanic or Latino of any race were 2.82% (113) of the population.

Of the 1,518 households, 28.7% had children under the age of 18; 67.2% were married couples living together; 6.1% had a female householder with no husband present and 23.9% were non-families. Of all households, 17.9% were made up of individuals and 6.2% had someone living alone who was 65 years of age or older. The average household size was 2.63 and the average family size was 3.01.

22.0% of the population were under the age of 18, 6.5% from 18 to 24, 18.2% from 25 to 44, 39.1% from 45 to 64, and 14.2% who were 65 years of age or older. The median age was 46.8 years. For every 100 females, the population had 106.9 males. For every 100 females ages 18 and older there were 101.0 males.

The Census Bureau's 2006–2010 American Community Survey showed that (in 2010 inflation-adjusted dollars) median household income was $105,846 (with a margin of error of +/− $12,725) and the median family income was $124,659 (+/− $16,916). Males had a median income of $87,727 (+/− $15,438) versus $53,491 (+/− $7,390) for females. The per capita income for the borough was $46,986 (+/− $4,981). About 0.8% of families and 2.1% of the population were below the poverty line, including none of those under age 18 and none of those age 65 or over.

=== 2000 census ===
As of the 2000 United States census there were 4,455 people, 1,581 households, and 1,305 families residing in the township. The population density was 155.3 inhabitants per square mile (60.0/km^{2}). There were 1,624 housing units at an average density of 56.6 per square mile (21.9/km^{2}). The racial makeup of the township was 96.97% White, 0.72% African American, 0.13% Native American, 0.92% Asian, 0.02% Pacific Islander, 0.47% from other races, and 0.76% from two or more races. Hispanic or Latino of any race were 1.53% of the population.

There were 1,581 households, out of which 36.6% had children under the age of 18 living with them, 73.8% were married couples living together, 5.6% had a female householder with no husband present, and 17.4% were non-families. 13.3% of all households were made up of individuals, and 5.6% had someone living alone who was 65 years of age or older. The average household size was 2.80 and the average family size was 3.07.

In the township the population was spread out, with 25.3% under the age of 18, 5.3% from 18 to 24, 27.6% from 25 to 44, 31.5% from 45 to 64, and 10.2% who were 65 years of age or older. The median age was 41 years. For every 100 females, there were 103.4 males. For every 100 females age 18 and over, there were 96.5 males.

The median income for a household in the township was $85,664, and the median income for a family was $90,000. Males had a median income of $60,945 versus $39,306 for females. The per capita income for the township was $37,187. About 1.8% of families and 1.7% of the population were below the poverty line, including 2.2% of those under age 18 and none of those age 65 or over.

== Government ==
=== Local government ===
East Amwell Township is governed under the Township form of New Jersey municipal government, one of 141 municipalities (of the 564) statewide that use this form, the second-most commonly used form of government in the state. The Township Committee is comprised of five members, who are elected directly by the voters at-large in partisan elections to serve three-year terms of office on a staggered basis, with either one or two seats coming up for election each year as part of the November general election in a three-year cycle. At an annual reorganization meeting, the Township Committee selects one of its members to serve as Mayor and another as Deputy Mayor.

As of 2023, members of the East Amwell Township Committee are Mayor Jenna Casper-Bloom (D, term on committee ends December 31, 2024; term as mayor ends 2023), Deputy Mayor Dante DiPirro (D, term on committee ends 2025; term as deputy mayor ends 2023), Mike Dendis (D, 2025), John Mills (R, 2023) and Tara Ramsey (R, 2023).

=== Federal, state and county representation ===
East Amwell Township is located in the 7th Congressional District and is part of New Jersey's 15th state legislative district.

For the 119th United States Congress, New Jersey's 7th congressional district is represented by Thomas Kean Jr. (R, Westfield). New Jersey is represented in the United States Senate by Democrats Cory Booker (Newark, term ends 2027) and Andy Kim (Moorestown, term ends 2031).

For the 2026–2027 session, the 15th legislative district of the New Jersey Legislature is represented in the State Senate by Shirley Turner (D, Lawrence Township) and in the General Assembly by Verlina Reynolds-Jackson (D, Trenton) and Anthony Verrelli (D, Hopewell Township).

Hunterdon County is governed by a Board of County Commissioners comprised of five members who are elected at-large on a partisan basis to serve three-year terms of office on a staggered basis, with either one or two seats up for election each year as part of the November general election. At an annual reorganization meeting held each January, the commissioners select one member to serve as the board's Director and another to serve as Deputy Director, each for a one-year term. As of 2025, Hunterdon County's Commissioners are Director John E. Lanza (R; Raritan Township, 2025), Deputy Director Shaun C. Van Doren (R; Tewksbury Township, 2026), Jeff Kuhl (R; Raritan Township, 2027), Zachary T. Rich (R; West Amwell Township, 2025) and Susan Soloway (R; Franklin Township, 2027).

Constitutional officers elected on a countywide basis are Clerk Mary H. Melfi (R; Flemington, 2026), Sheriff Fredrick W. Brown (R; Alexandria Township, 2025) and Surrogate Heidi Rohrbach (R; Lebanon Township, 2028).

=== Politics ===
As of March 2011, there were a total of 3,059 registered voters in East Amwell Township, of which 875 (28.6%) were registered as Democrats, 956 (31.3%) were registered as Republicans and 1,224 (40.0%) were registered as Unaffiliated. There were 4 voters registered as Libertarians or Greens.

Gubernatorial election results for East Amwell Township
Year	Republican		Democratic		Third party(ies)	
Year	No.	%	No.	%	No.	%
2025	1,117	51.47%	1,042	48.02%	11	0.51%
2021	1,143	57.18%	842	42.12%	14	0.70%
2017	1,039	58.50%	687	38.68%	50	2.82%
2013	1,223	71.60%	448	26.23%	37	2.17%
2009	1,196	61.90%	571	29.55%	165	8.54%
2005	1,126	58.01%	707	36.42%	108	5.56%

In the 2012 presidential election, Republican Mitt Romney received 57.3% of the vote (1,346 cast), ahead of Democrat Barack Obama with 40.9% (961 votes), and other candidates with 1.7% (41 votes), among the 2,364 ballots cast by the township's 3,135 registered voters (16 ballots were spoiled), for a turnout of 75.4%. In the 2008 presidential election, Republican John McCain received 54.8% of the vote (1,405 cast), ahead of Democrat Barack Obama with 42.4% (1,088 votes) and other candidates with 1.7% (44 votes), among the 2,564 ballots cast by the township's 3,180 registered voters, for a turnout of 80.6%. In the 2004 presidential election, Republican George W. Bush received 57.3% of the vote (1,452 ballots cast), outpolling Democrat John Kerry with 41.8% (1,059 votes) and other candidates with 1.0% (30 votes), among the 2,534 ballots cast by the township's 3,043 registered voters, for a turnout percentage of 83.3.

United States presidential election results for East Amwell Township
Year	Republican		Democratic		Third party(ies)	
Year	No.	%	No.	%	No.	%
2024	1,391	52.27%	1,225	46.04%	45	1.69%
2020	1,419	51.17%	1,306	47.10%	48	1.73%
2016	1,306	54.46%	978	40.78%	114	4.75%
2012	1,346	57.33%	961	40.93%	41	1.75%
2008	1,405	55.38%	1,088	42.89%	44	1.73%
2004	1,452	57.14%	1,059	41.68%	30	1.18%

In the 2013 gubernatorial election, Republican Chris Christie received 71.6% of the vote (1,223 cast), ahead of Democrat Barbara Buono with 26.2% (448 votes), and other candidates with 2.2% (37 votes), among the 1,770 ballots cast by the township's 3,088 registered voters (62 ballots were spoiled), for a turnout of 57.3%. In the 2009 gubernatorial election, Republican Chris Christie received 61.2% of the vote (1,196 ballots cast), ahead of Democrat Jon Corzine with 29.2% (571 votes), Independent Chris Daggett with 7.4% (145 votes) and other candidates with 1.0% (20 votes), among the 1,953 ballots cast by the township's 3,094 registered voters, yielding a 63.1% turnout.

United States Senate election results for East Amwell Township1
Year	Republican		Democratic		Third party(ies)	
Year	No.	%	No.	%	No.	%
2024	1,288	51.11%	1,172	46.51%	60	2.38%
2018	1,246	56.89%	863	39.41%	81	3.70%
2012	1,243	56.42%	885	40.17%	75	3.40%
2006	1,046	55.82%	747	39.86%	81	4.32%

United States Senate election results for East Amwell Township2
Year	Republican		Democratic		Third party(ies)	
Year	No.	%	No.	%	No.	%
2020	1,424	52.31%	1,223	44.93%	75	2.76%
2014	867	55.51%	660	42.25%	35	2.24%
2013	641	58.86%	437	40.13%	11	1.01%
2008	1,436	59.88%	898	37.45%	64	2.67%

== Education ==
The East Amwell Township School District serves public school students in pre-kindergarten through eighth grade at East Amwell Township School. As of the 2021–22 school year, the district, comprised of one school, had an enrollment of 356 students and 41.2 classroom teachers (on an FTE basis), for a student–teacher ratio of 8.6:1.

Public school students in ninth through twelfth grades attend Hunterdon Central High School, part of the Hunterdon Central Regional High School District in central Hunterdon County, which serves students from Delaware Township, East Amwell Township, Flemington Borough, Raritan Township and Readington Township. As of the 2021–22 school year, the high school had an enrollment of 2,575 students and 225.3 classroom teachers (on an FTE basis), for a student–teacher ratio of 11.4:1. Seats on the high school district's nine-member board of education are allocated based in the population of the five constituent municipalities who participate in the school district, with one seat allocated to East Amwell Township.

Eighth grade students from all of Hunterdon County are eligible to apply to attend the high school programs offered by the Hunterdon County Vocational School District, a county-wide vocational school district that offers career and technical education at its campuses in Raritan Township and at programs sited at local high schools, with no tuition charged to students for attendance.

== Transportation ==
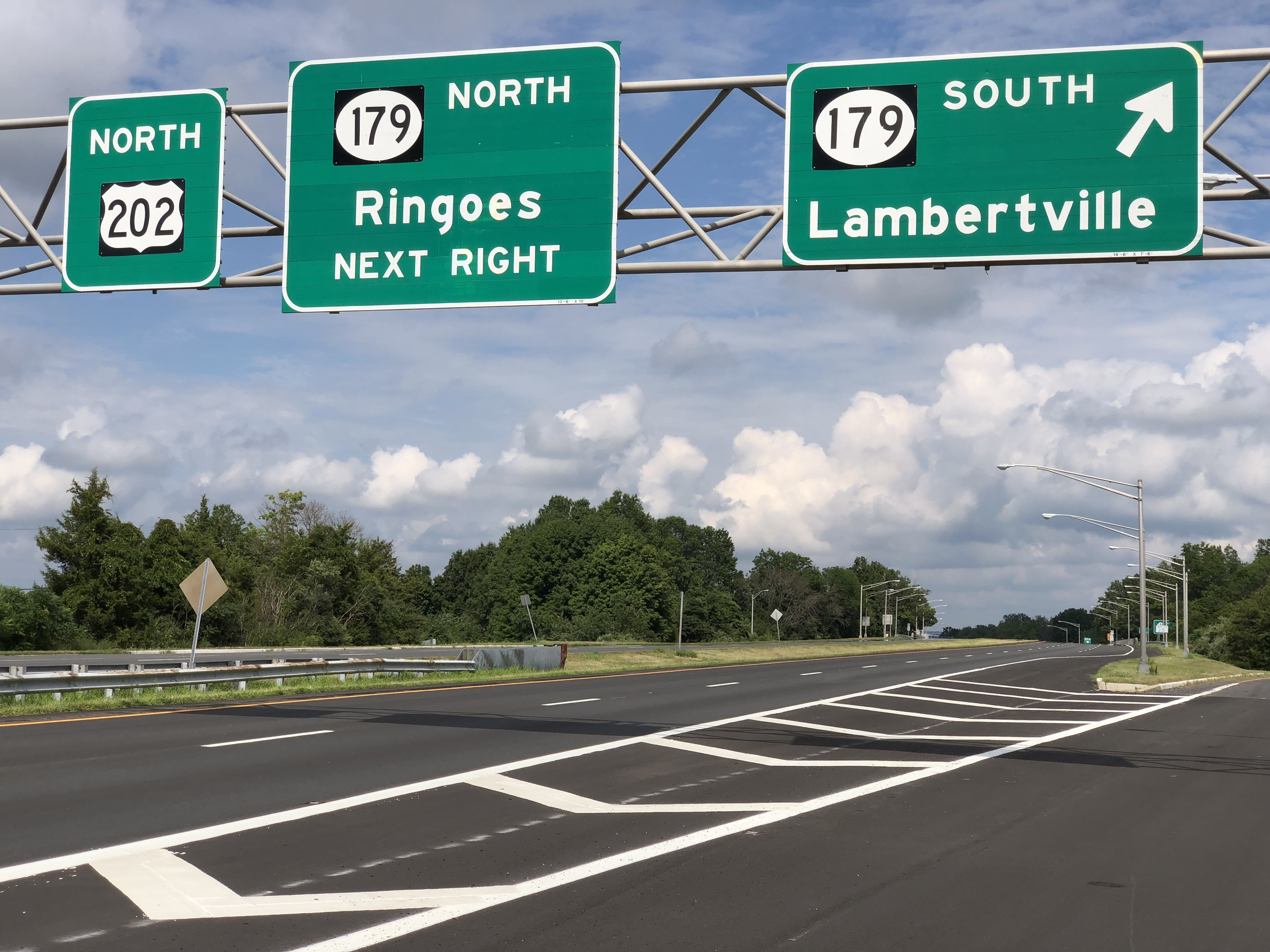
U.S. Route 202 northbound at Route 179 in East Amwell

As of May 2010, the township had a total of 68.03 miles (109.48 km) of roadways, of which 42.84 miles (68.94 km) were maintained by the municipality, 17.15 miles (27.60 km) by Hunterdon County and 8.04 miles (12.94 km) by the New Jersey Department of Transportation.

Route 31 passes through mostly along the western border with West Amwell Township. Route 179 and U.S. Route 202 pass through near Ringoes, with Route 31 becoming concurrent with U.S. 202 where they intersect.

Major county roads that go through the township are County Route 514 (along the border with Raritan) and County Route 579. The closest limited access road is Interstate 295 in neighboring Hopewell Township.

== The Hopewell Project ==
East Amwell is home to an experimental renewable energy project called The Hopewell Project, which uses solar power to generate hydrogen that is used to provide 100% of a home's heating, cooling and electrical needs. The Hopewell Solar-Hydrogen Residence was dedicated on October 20, 2006.

== Wineries ==
- Old York Cellars
- Unionville Vineyards

== Notable people ==
People who were born in, residents of, or otherwise closely associated with East Amwell Township include:

- Hannah Altman (born 1995), photographer, whose artwork explores lineage, memory, ritual, and storytelling
- James Buchanan (1839–1900), represented New Jersey's 2nd congressional district from 1885 to 1893
- Matt Ioannidis (born 1994), defensive end for the Washington Football Team of the National Football League
- Charles Lindbergh (1902–1974) and Anne Morrow Lindbergh (1906–2001), aviators. The Lindbergh kidnapping occurred at the family home in East Amwell, though press reports were filed from the nearby town of Hopewell
- Andrew Maguire (born 1939), represented New Jersey's 7th congressional district from 1975 to 1981
- David Stout Manners (1808–1884), Mayor of Jersey City, New Jersey from 1852 to 1857
- Stan Ploski Jr. (born 1944), retired dirt modified racing driver
- Horace Griggs Prall (1881–1951), acting Governor of New Jersey in 1935
- Jason Read (born 1977), rower who rowed in the bow seat in the 2004 Summer Olympics gold medal-winning U.S. Men's Rowing Team Eight
