= Amwell Valley =

Valley in Hunterdon County, New Jersey, United States

Coordinates: 40.436°N 74.830°W

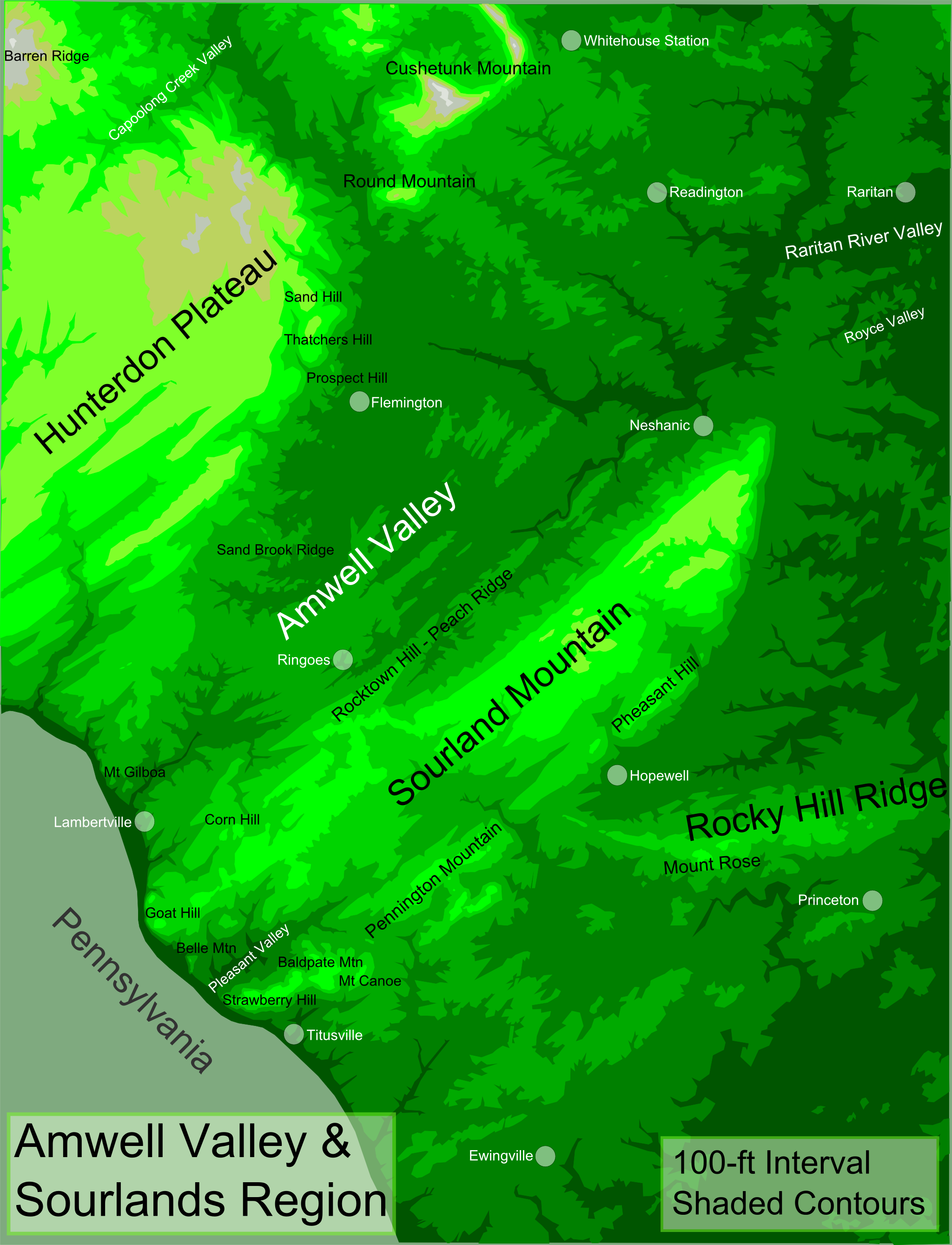
Topographic map depicting the greater Amwell Valley-Sourlands region.

The Amwell Valley is a small valley in Hunterdon County, New Jersey, between the Hunterdon Plateau and the Sourlands. It comprises Stockton, parts of Delaware Township, West Amwell, East Amwell, Flemington and Raritan Township. The region borders the Delaware River to the west and the South Branch Raritan River to the east. The entire area has elevations around 200 feet above sea level. US 202 (including a shared section with NJ 31) is the main route running west to east through the valley. Old York Road also passes through the valley, taking a generally more southern route (Old York crosses 202 twice in the area) through Raritan and along the Sourlands at Mount Airy. Like the Hunterdon Plateau, Amwell Valley still has a large number of farms due to its sufficient climate, relatively flat land and the presence of silt-loams soils. The valley is home to Unionville Winery and Old York Cellars in Ringoes.

== Villages ==
- Larison's Corners, formerly Pleasant Corner, was named after John W. Larison, the owner of the tavern there. The Amwell United First Presbyterian Church was formerly the German reformed church. The first house built there was a log house (now on the site of the church's graveyard), which was replaced by a stone building, simply called the "Old Stone House".
- Reaville, first called Manners Tavern (after John Manners) and then Greenville (after Richard Green), is located at the corner of Old York Road and Amwell Road. George Whitefield gave a sermon in 1740 at the Presbyterian Church, which was moved from its original location. The village was also home to a school, a hotel, a post office, a store, shops and numerous dwelling. The current name of the village was taken from Runkle Rea, the first postmaster of the village.
- Ringoes, named for John Ringo (originally called Ringo's), who established a tavern there, is the oldest European settlement in Hunterdon County. The village was built where the Nariticong Trail (which became Old York Road) and the Malayelick Trail crossed. The village was once home to general stores, blacksmith shops, wheelwright shops, a hotel, a harness shop, shoemakers, a cotton and woolen factory and a post office. It also was home to the Amwell Academy and the Academy of Science.
- Cloverhill, named for Peter C. Clover, was previously called Koughstown (pronounced kuestown) after Casparus Kough Jr. and was located on Amwell Road and Clover Hill Road. The village was home to a tavern, store, church, hotel, blacksmith, post office and eight or nine houses.
- Minksville, named after the minks found in the area, was a hamlet near Wertsville Road near Dutch Lane). It was later called Union and Unionville, due to its location of crossroads (including nearby Old York Road).
