= Larisons Corners, New Jersey =

Populated place in Hunterdon County, New Jersey, US

- Unincorporated community
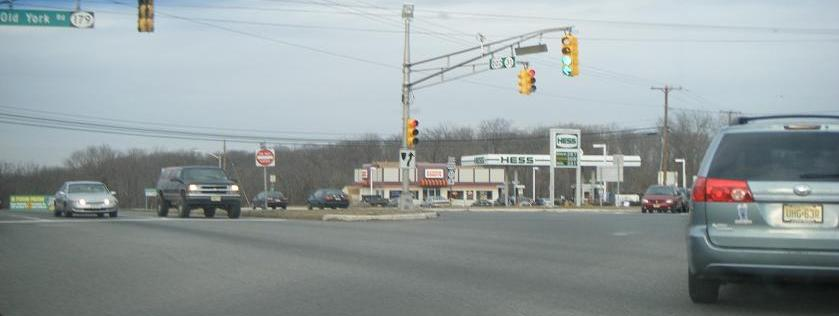
- Larisons Corners

- Location of Larisons Corners in Hunterdon County Inset: Location of county within the state of New Jersey Larisons Corners, New Jersey (New Jersey) Larisons Corners, New Jersey (the United States)
- Coordinates: 40°26′29″N 74°51′23″W
- Country: United States
- State: New Jersey
- County: Hunterdon
- Township: East Amwell and Raritan
- Elevation: 266 ft (81 m)
- GNIS feature ID: 877673

Larisons Corners, also spelled Larison's Corners, is an unincorporated community located along the border of East Amwell and Raritan townships in Hunterdon County, New Jersey, United States.

== History ==
The area was settled in 1749 after a ship bound for New York City carrying German settlers was blown off course and instead landed at Philadelphia. The settlers resumed their journey north to New York City by traveling along Old York Road, where they "fell in love with the land" while passing through Larisons Corners.

Their settlement was first called "Pleasant Corners", and a German Reformed Church was established. Several members of the Rockefeller family are buried in the church cemetery.

An inn was established in 1779 at the crossroads of Dutch Lane and Old York Road. The inn was sold and renamed Larisons Corner Tavern, and was "one of the Old York Road's most popular taverns, which featured ballroom dancing downstairs and a gambling den upstairs where professional card players fleeced farmers of their hard-earned cash".

By 1811, "the name Larisons Corner had become attached to the surrounding town", and the settlement had a blacksmith shop.

The nearby community of Ringoes held their annual Ringoes Grange Fair in Larison's Corner in 1940. It featured chicken-catching contests, bingo, music, and milking cows, while gambling and alcohol were forbidden.
