= U.S. Route 202 in New Jersey =

Highway in New Jersey, U.S.

U.S. Route 202

Route information
- Maintained by NJDOT, DRJTBC, and Morris, Passaic, and Bergen Counties
- Length: 80.31 mi (129.25 km)
- Existed: 1934–present

Major junctions
- South end: US 202 at the Pennsylvania state line in Lambertville
- Route 12 / Route 31 in Flemington; US 206 / Route 28 at the Raritan–Bridgewater Township line; US 22 in Bridgewater Township; I-287 in Bridgewater Township; Route 10 in Morris Plains; I-80 in Parsippany–Troy Hills; I-287 / US 46 in Parsippany–Troy Hills; Route 23 in Wayne; Route 17 in Mahwah
- North end: US 202 at the New York state line in Mahwah

Location
- Country: United States
- State: New Jersey
- Counties: Hunterdon, Somerset, Morris, Passaic, Bergen

Highway system
- United States Numbered Highway System; List; Special; Divided; New Jersey State Highway Routes; Interstate; US; State; Scenic Byways
← I-195	→ US 206
← Route 120	→ Route 122

U.S. Route 202 (US 202) is a U.S. Highway running from New Castle, Delaware northeast to Bangor, Maine. In the U.S. state of New Jersey, the route runs 80.31 mi (129.25 km) from the New Hope–Lambertville Toll Bridge over the Delaware River at the Pennsylvania border in Delaware Township, Hunterdon County, near Lambertville northeast to the New York border in Mahwah, Bergen County. Along the route's journey, it passes through a variety of suburban and rural environments, including the communities of Flemington, Somerville, Morristown, Parsippany–Troy Hills, Wayne, and Oakland as well as five counties: Hunterdon, Somerset, Morris, Passaic, and Bergen. US 202 encounters many major roads in New Jersey, including Route 31, US 206, US 22, Interstate 80 (I-80), US 46, Route 23, and Route 17. From Somerville to the New York border, US 202 generally runs within a close distance of I-287 and interchanges with that route several times. The road ranges from a four-lane freeway between Lambertville and Ringoes in Hunterdon County to a two-lane surface road through much of the northern portion of the route. North of the Route 53 intersection in Morris Plains, US 202 is maintained by individual counties rather than the New Jersey Department of Transportation with a few exceptions.

In the original system of New Jersey state highways, present-day U.S. Route 202 was legislated as pre-1927 Route 5 between Morristown and Morris Plains in 1916 and as pre-1927 Route 16 between Somerville and Morristown in 1921. In 1927, the current route was designated as Route 29 between Lambertville and Ringoes, Route 30 (now Route 31) between Ringoes and Flemington, Route 12 between Flemington and Somerville, Route 31 (now U.S. Route 206) between Somerville and Bedminster, Route 32 between Bedminster and Mountain View, and Route 23 within a portion of Wayne. Meanwhile, US 122 was signed in New Jersey to run from the New Hope–Lambertville Bridge in Lambertville, where the route continued south to State Road, Delaware, along Bridge Street, Route 29, and Route 30 to Flemington, and then along present-day County Route 523 (CR 523) to US 22 in White House. In 1934, US 122 was renumbered to US 202, and realigned to follow its current route to New York border near Suffern, New York, where it continued to Bangor, Maine. In 1953, all the state highway designations were removed from US 202 except for Route 23 and Route 30 (which became Route 69 before becoming Route 31 in 1967) to avoid long concurrencies with the route. In the 1960s, plans were made to upgrade US 202 to a freeway between the Pennsylvania border and I-287 in Bridgewater Township. The only parts of this freeway that were completed were a bypass of Ringoes in the 1960s and a freeway between the Delaware River and Ringoes in 1974; the rest was canceled due to opposition from residents along the route. With the completion of the US 202 freeway in Hunterdon County, the former alignment became Route 179. The portion of US 202 concurrent with Route 23 in Wayne was upgraded from a four-lane road to a six-lane road in the 1980s.

== Route description ==
=== Hunterdon County ===
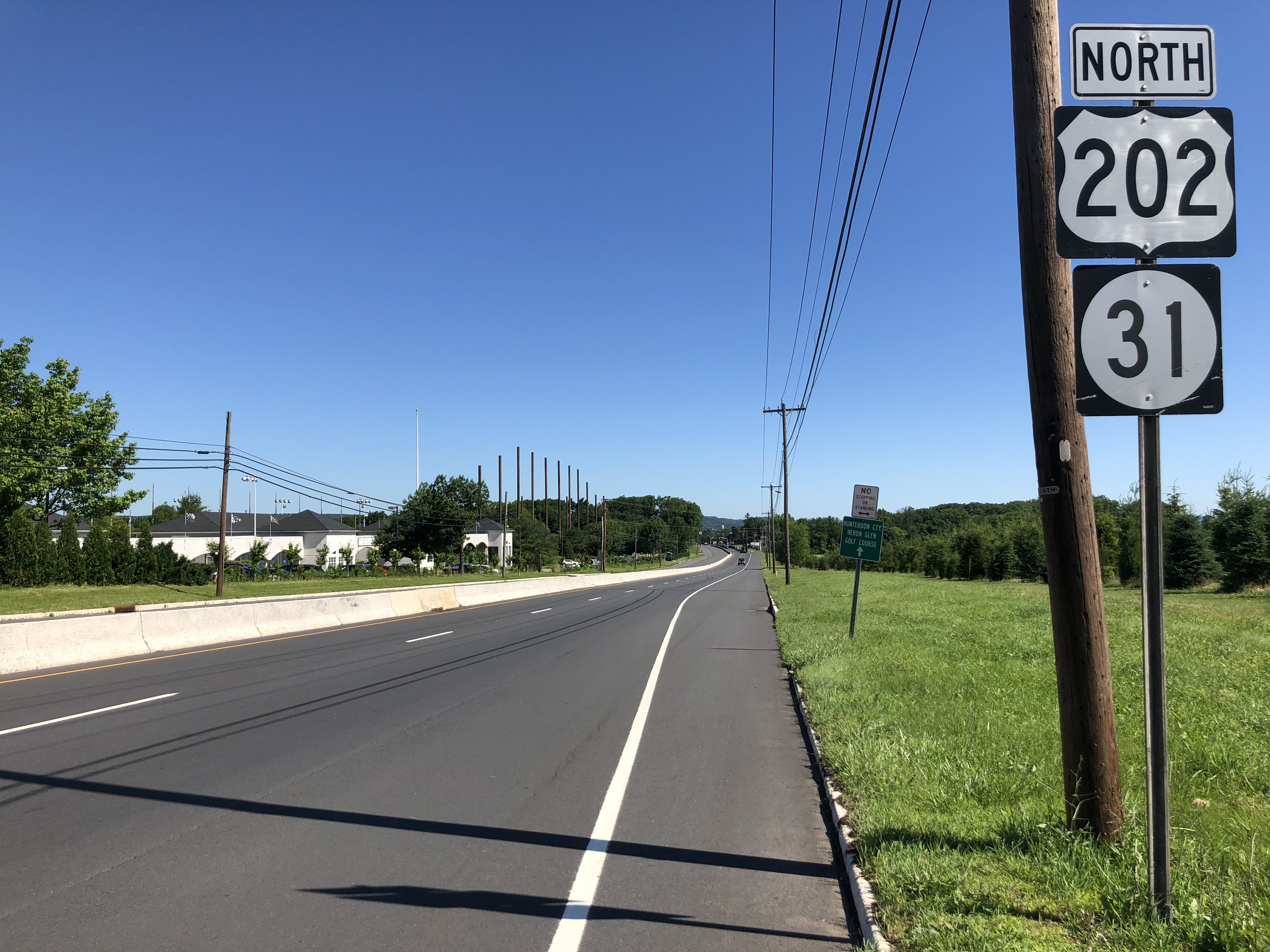
US 202/Route 31 northbound in Raritan Township

U.S. Route 202 crosses into Delaware Township in Hunterdon County, New Jersey on the New Hope–Lambertville Toll Bridge over the Delaware River from Solebury Township, Pennsylvania, heading to the northeast as a four-lane freeway maintained by the Delaware River Joint Toll Bridge Commission. Shortly after entering New Jersey, the route passes over the Delaware and Raritan Canal and comes to an interchange with Route 29 that features a northbound exit, a northbound entrance from southbound Route 29, and a southbound entrance. The route becomes maintained by the New Jersey Department of Transportation here and crosses the Alexauken Creek into Lambertville where the route features a southbound exit and northbound entrance with Alexauken Creek Road that provides access to Route 29 from southbound U.S. Route 202 and to northbound U.S. Route 202 from northbound Route 29. Past Alexauken Creek Road, the freeway enters West Amwell Township, where it heads through a mix of woodland and farmland. It comes to a diamond interchange with County Route 605 (Queen Road), which provides access to Mount Airy and Dilts Corner. Past the County Route 605 interchange, U.S. Route 202 continues northeast through agricultural areas, paralleled by Frontage Road to the north. It crosses into East Amwell Township and features to a partial cloverleaf interchange with Route 179. Past the Route 179 interchange, the road runs briefly through West Amwell Township before entering East Amwell Township again, bypassing the community of Ringoes. It comes to a partial interchange with Route 31 and County Route 579, with access to southbound Route 31 and County Route 579 from both directions of U.S. Route 202 and access to northbound U.S. Route 202 from northbound Route 31 and County Route 579.

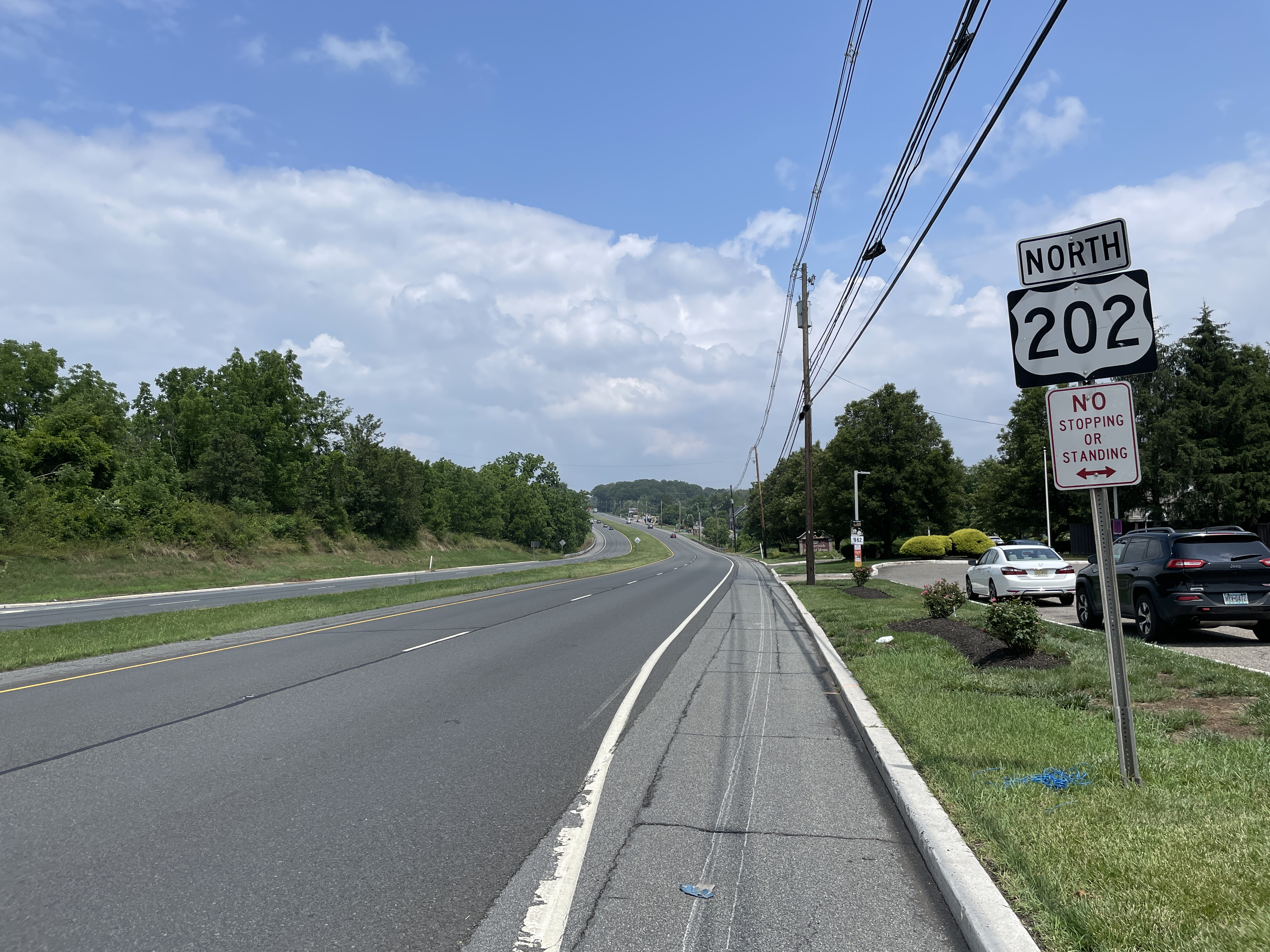
US 202 northbound past CR 613 in Readington Township

Here, Route 31 begins a concurrency with U.S. Route 202, and both routes continue north as a four-lane arterial road with jughandles, intersecting County Route 602 (Wertsville Road). The next intersection is for Old York Road, which heads to the southwest as Route 179 and to the northeast as County Route 514. Shortly past this intersection, the route briefly forms the border between East Amwell Township to the west and Raritan Township to the east before crossing entirely into Raritan Township. The road continues north through farms, reaching commercial development as it approaches the Flemington area. Past the intersection with County Route 611 (South Main Street), the road widens to six lanes and crosses into Flemington. The road comes to the Flemington Circle where Route 31 heads north and Route 12 heads west.

Past the Flemington Circle, U.S. Route 202 proceeds northeast on a four-lane arterial road that crosses back into Raritan Township. It heads through woodland, passing by Northlandz, which is home to the world's largest model railroad in HO scale. The road crosses the South Branch Raritan River into Readington Township, where it heads east, passing over Norfolk Southern's Lehigh Line north of Three Bridges. Past Three Bridges, the route runs through a mix of woods and farms.

=== Somerset County ===
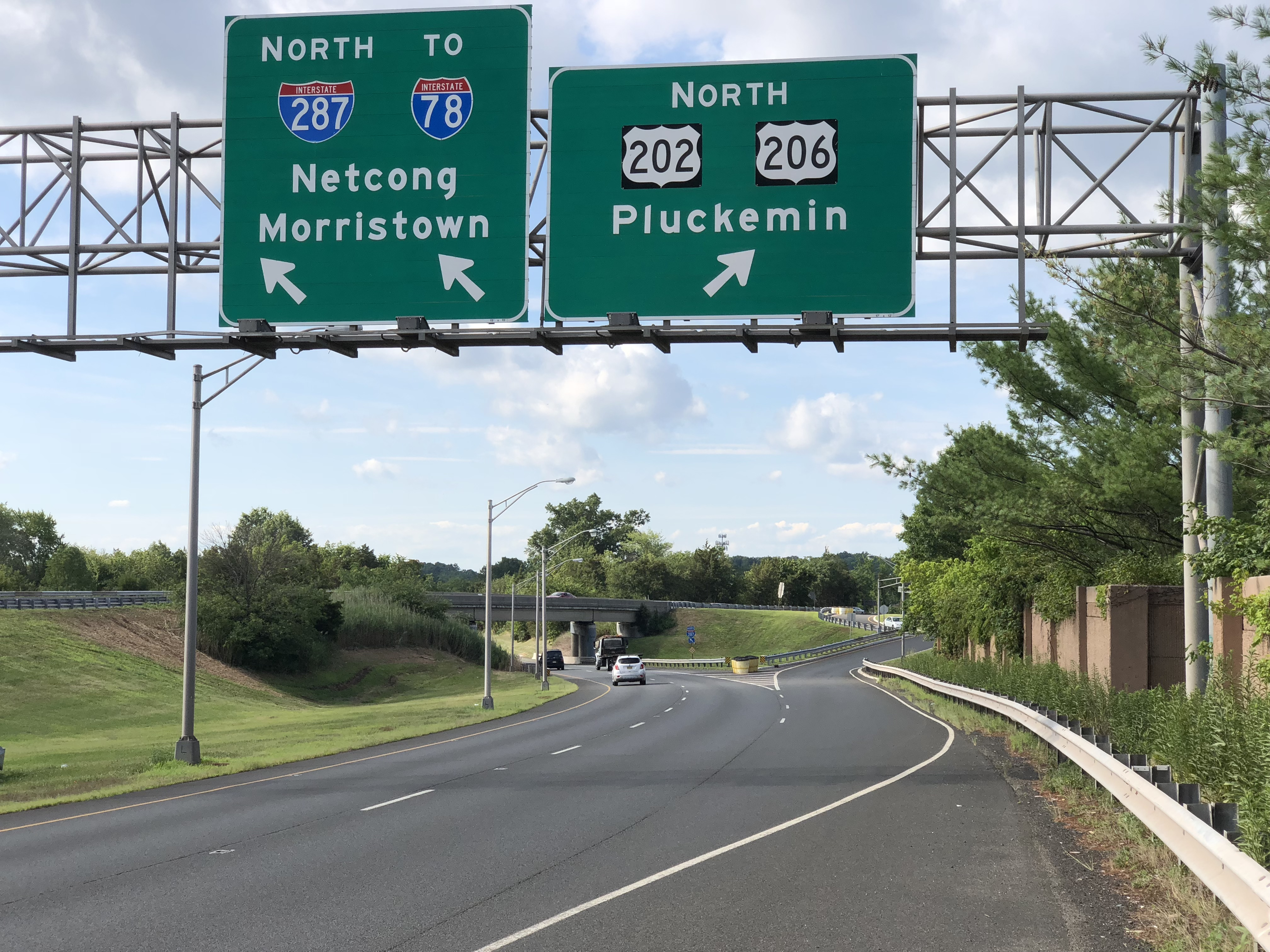
US 202/US 206 northbound at exit for northbound I-287 in Bridgewater Township

U.S. Route 202 crosses into Branchburg Township, where it crosses Old York Road again. It continues northeast through agricultural areas with residences and businesses increasing along the road After crossing Old York Road (County Route 637) another time, the route heads through suburban commercial areas. The road passes north of the Branchburg Township Park and Ride, a park and ride facility. It passes over the North Branch Raritan River and enters Bridgewater Township, where it passes under NJ Transit’s Raritan Valley Line and runs past a shopping center. U.S. Route 202 heads east into Raritan, where it passes through business areas and crosses County Route 567 (First Avenue). Past the County Route 567 intersection, the road comes to the modified Somerville Circle, where it intersects U.S. Route 206 and Route 28. U.S. Route 202 passes over the circle with ramps to U.S. Route 206 and Route 28, which head through the circle.

U.S. Route 206 forms a concurrency with U.S. Route 202 past the Somerville Circle and the two routes continue north through Bridgewater Township, briefly entering Somerville. The road becomes features an interchange with U.S. Route 22 and heads north with the Bridgewater Commons shopping mall on the east side of the road and the Somerset Corporate Center on the west side of the road. An interchange with Commons Way provides access to both these places. Past Commons Way, the road passes under Garrettson Road and comes to an interchange with Interstate 287 that also provides access to Interstate 78. Past the Interstate 287 interchange, U.S. Routes 202 and 206 continue north as a two-lane undivided road with residences to the east and corporate parks to the west. The road crosses Chambers Brook into Bedminster Township, where it soon passes under Interstate 78. Shortly after Interstate 78, it widens into a four-lane arterial road with a Jersey barrier that runs through a mix of commercial and residential areas. U.S. Routes 202 and 206 come to another interchange with Interstate 287, pass over the North Branch Raritan River again, and come to an intersection where the two routes split.

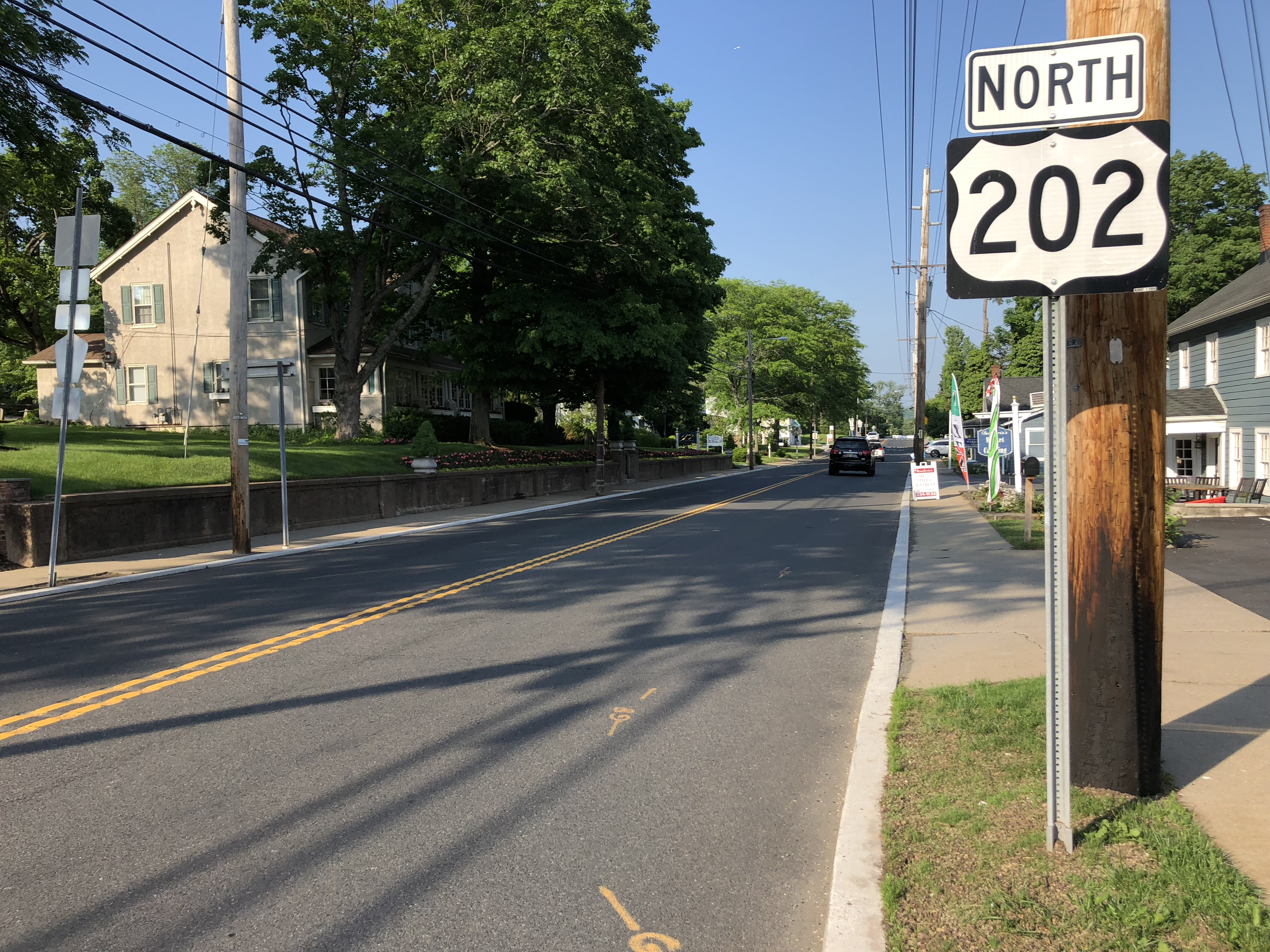
View north along US 202 at CR 523 in Bedminster

Upon splitting from U.S. Route 206, U.S. Route 202 heads north on Somerville Road, a two-lane undivided road. It soon meets County Route 523 (Main Street), and U.S. Route 202 makes a right turn to head to the northeast on Lamington Road. The route heads east through residential areas and crosses the North Branch Raritan River into Far Hills. Upon entering Far Hills, the route intersects County Route 512 (Peapack Road), forming a concurrency that lasts with that route until County Route 512 heads south on Far Hills Road just before U.S. Route 202 crosses NJ Transit’s Gladstone Branch near the Far Hills Station. From here, the road heads northeast through wooded areas with some clearings and residences, crossing into Bernardsville. In Bernardsville, U.S. Route 202 heads through rural areas with trees and fields as Mine Brook Road before reaching the town itself. In the town, the route intersects County Route 525 (Claremont Road), briefly running concurrent with that route until it heads south on Mt. Airy Road. From the center of Bernardsville, U.S. Route 202 runs northeast as Morristown Road, crossing into Bernards Township, where it heads through wooded residential areas. In the Franklin Corners section of Bernards Township, the road features an intersection with County Route 613 (Childs Road) and North Maple Avenue, the latter providing access to Interstate 287.

=== Morris County ===
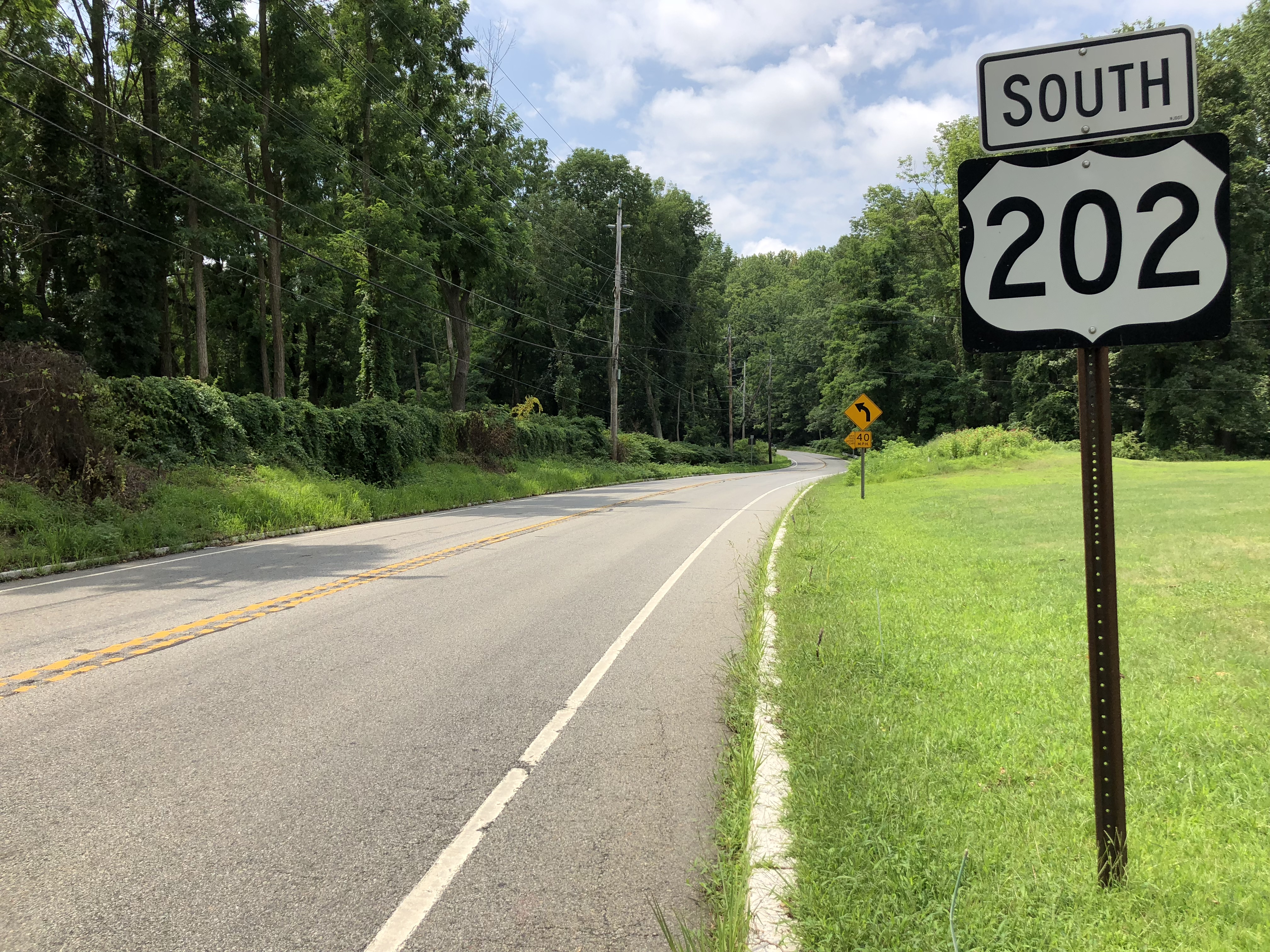
US 202 southbound past CR 646 in Harding Township

U.S. Route 202 crosses the Passaic River into Harding Township, Morris County, where the route becomes Mt. Kemble Avenue. The NJDOT replaced this bridge with a new bridge built in seven days during August 2012. The new bridge was designed by AmerCom Corporation and built by Joseph M. Sanzari, Inc. utilizing Accelerated Bridge Construction techniques. In Harding Township, the road runs north through mostly wooded residential and commercial areas, closely paralleling Interstate 287, which runs to the east of U.S. Route 202. It heads into more heavily forested areas, running to the east of Morristown National Historical Park, before continuing northeast into Morris Township. Here, U.S. Route 202 continues through woodland, but residences start to increase along the road and it passes by an industrial facility. It passes by the Spring Brook Country Club before crossing into Morristown. Upon entering Morristown, the route heads toward the downtown area, where it splits into a one-way pair following Market Street northbound and Bank Street southbound. The one-way pair comes to Park Place, a square in the center of Morristown, where U.S. Route 202 meets County Route 510 and Route 124. County Route 510 heads west from the square on Washington Street and east from the square on Morris Street, while Route 124 heads east from the square on South Street. Meanwhile, U.S. Route 202 continues north from Park Place on Speedwell Avenue, a two-lane road that heads past numerous downtown businesses. The route then leaves the downtown area, heading through residential neighborhoods and crossing the Whippany River before leaving Morristown and crossing back into Morris Township, where it briefly passes through an area of businesses. At the intersection with County Route 650 (Hanover Avenue), U.S. Route 202 crosses into Morris Plains, where it continues north through suburban commercial and residential areas. The route passes under NJ Transit’s Morristown Line near the Morris Plains Station and intersects the southern terminus of Route 53 (Tabor Road).

Past the Route 53 intersection, maintenance of U.S. Route 202 is transferred from the New Jersey Department of Transportation to the county and it resumes northeast on Littleton Road, heading through residential areas. It enters an area of corporate parks as it crosses Route 10 and heads into Parsippany–Troy Hills. After passing through the area of corporate parks, the road heads back through suburban neighborhoods before coming to an interchange with Interstate 80. In the vicinity of the Interstate 80 interchange, U.S. Route 202 is state maintained. Past the interchange, U.S. Route 202 closely parallels Interstate 80 to the north as a four-lane surface road before coming to an intersection with County Route 511 (Parsippany Boulevard), where U.S. Route 202 makes a left turn onto that route to form a concurrency.

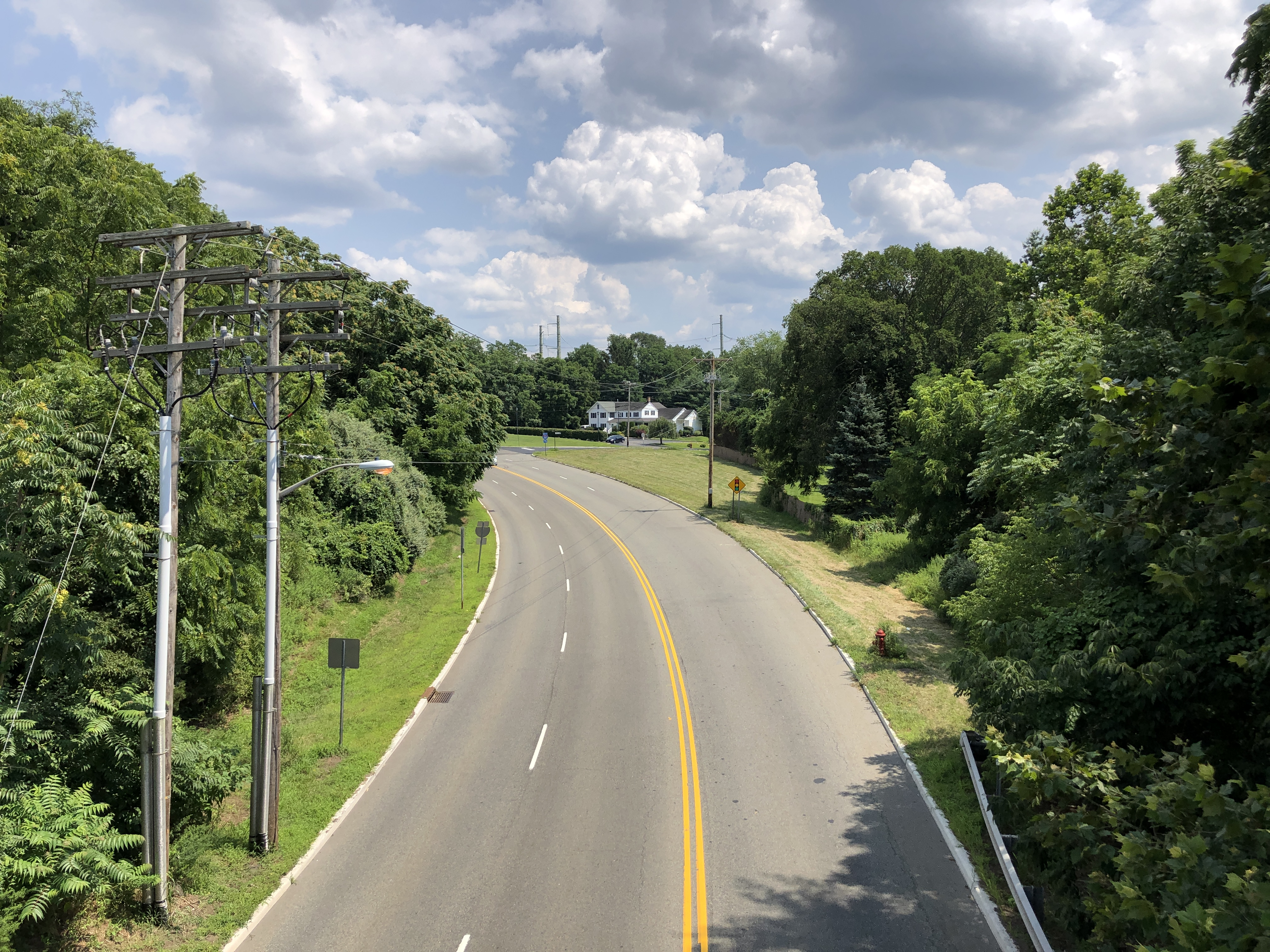
US 202 northbound at I-287 in Montville

The two routes continue north on Parsippany Boulevard, a two-lane road that comes to an intersection with U.S. Route 46, where the road is briefly state maintained. Past U.S. Route 46, the road continues north, intersecting ramps that provide access to and from southbound Interstate 287. Here, the road becomes county maintained again. It passes by business parks and then wooded residential areas, closely paralleling Interstate 287 again. At the intersection with Intervale Road, U.S. Route 202 and County Route 511 make a right turn, immediately interchanging with Interstate 287, with access to the southbound direction and from the northbound direction. The routes follow Intervale Road briefly before making a left turn to resume onto Parsippany Boulevard. The road crosses over the Jersey City Reservoir, which supplies drinking water to Jersey City, and enters Boonton, where the road becomes Washington Street. This street carries the two routes through residential areas before coming to another interchange with Interstate 287 that also features access to the southbound direction and access from the northbound direction. Past this interchange, U.S. Route 202 splits from County Route 511 by heading to the northeast on Myrtle Avenue.

Myrtle Avenue carries U.S. Route 202 through commercial areas sandwiched by Interstate 287 to the southeast and NJ Transit’s Montclair-Boonton Line. Along Myrtle Avenue, U.S. Route 202 features ramps to and from southbound Interstate 287. The route crosses into Montville, where it becomes Main Road and runs a farther distance from Interstate 287, heading north through residential areas. The road turns east and makes a left turn to head north on Main Street, which angles east and comes to an interchange with Interstate 287. Past this interchange, U.S. Route 202 continues through commercial areas, crossing over the Montclair-Boonton Line, before heading into residential neighborhoods, running parallel to the Montclair-Boonton Line. After passing Towaco Station, the route makes a right turn, passes under the railroad line, immediately makes a left turn to resume on Main Street. The route heads east as a four-lane road running to the south of the railroad tracks through residential areas, narrowing to two lanes. It enters Lincoln Park, where U.S. Route 202 intersects County Route 633 (Boonton Turnpike), continuing east onto Boonton Turnpike. A short distance later, the route intersects County Route 511 Alternate (Comly Road) and forms a wrong-way concurrency with that route. The two routes continue southeast through wooded residential neighborhoods, eventually running parallel to the Pompton River.

=== Passaic and Bergen counties ===
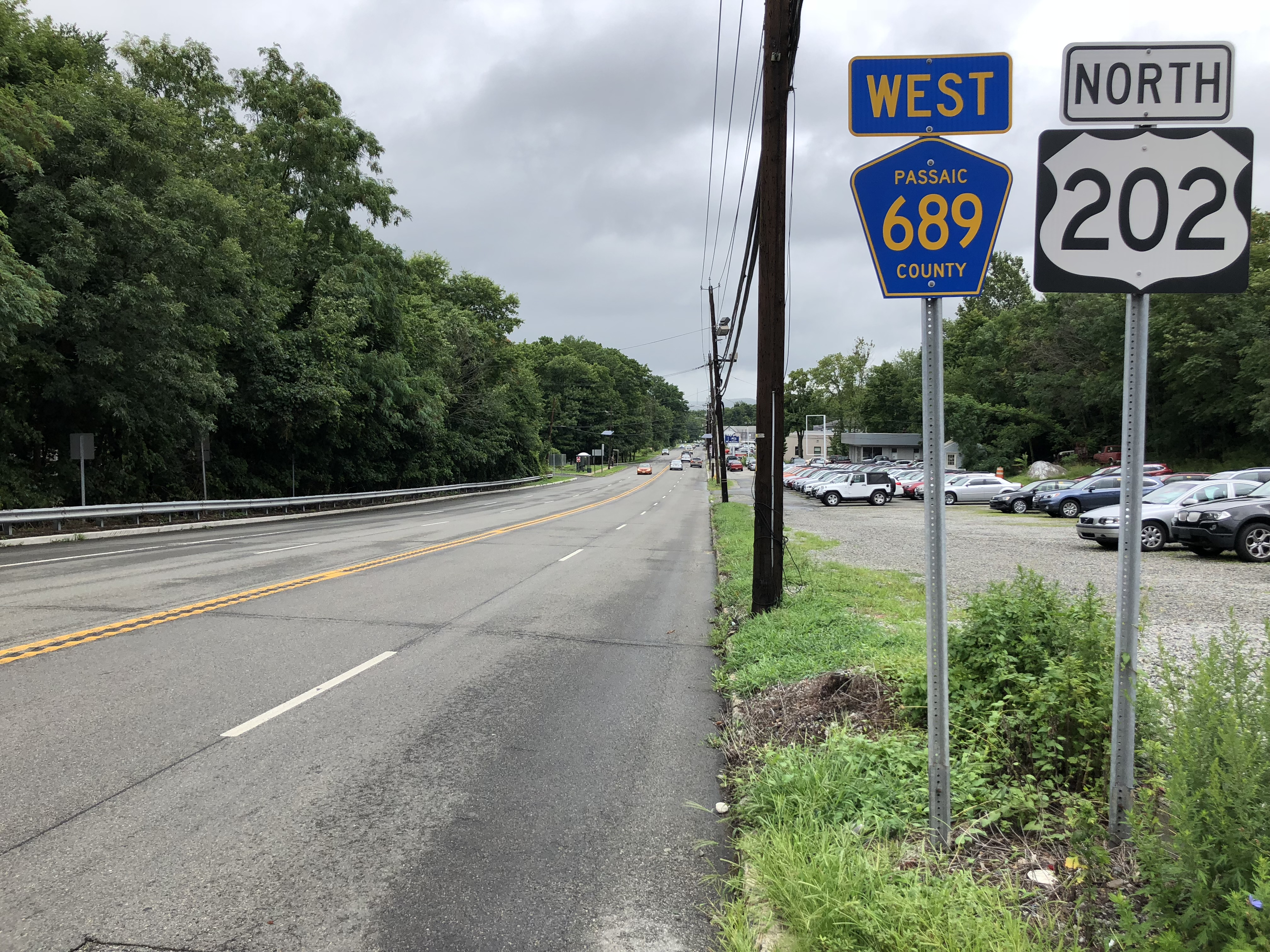
US 202 northbound concurrent with CR 689 westbound in Wayne

U.S. Route 202 and County Route 511 Alternate cross the Pompton River into Wayne, Passaic County, where the road becomes Mountainview Boulevard. It crosses the Montclair-Boonton Line near the Mountain View Station and comes to an interchange with Route 23, where County Route 511 Alternate ends and U.S. Route 202 heads north on Route 23, a six-lane freeway that is state maintained. The road passes over a Norfolk Southern railroad line before it has an interchange with County Route 670 (Alps Road). Following this, the roadway becomes a six-lane arterial road passes west of the Mother's Park & Ride, a park and ride facility serving NJ Transit buses, and reaches an interchange with County Route 683 (Newark-Pompton Turnpike). At a U-turn ramp, the eastbound direction of County Route 504 follows both directions of the road, having to use the ramp in order to continue across the road. Northbound U.S. Route 202 splits from Route 23, where the cut-off intersection with County Route 504 is located. At this point, the westbound direction of County Route 504 and the southbound direction of U.S. Route 202 follow southbound Route 23 until an intersection.

Past Route 23 and County Route 504, U.S. Route 202 heads north on Black Oak Ridge Road, a county maintained road that heads through residential neighborhoods. The road comes to an intersection with County Route 689 (Paterson-Hamburg Turnpike), where U.S. Route 202 merges onto that road, forming a concurrency. The Paterson-Hamburg Turnpike heads north past some businesses, running a short distance to the east of the Ramapo River, before coming to Terhune Drive, where U.S. Route 202 makes a right turn onto that road with County Route 689 continuing north on Paterson-Hamburg Turnpike. Terhune Drive carries U.S. Route 202 north through wooded neighborhoods, running in between Pines Lake to the east and Pompton Lake, which is part of the Ramapo River, to the west.

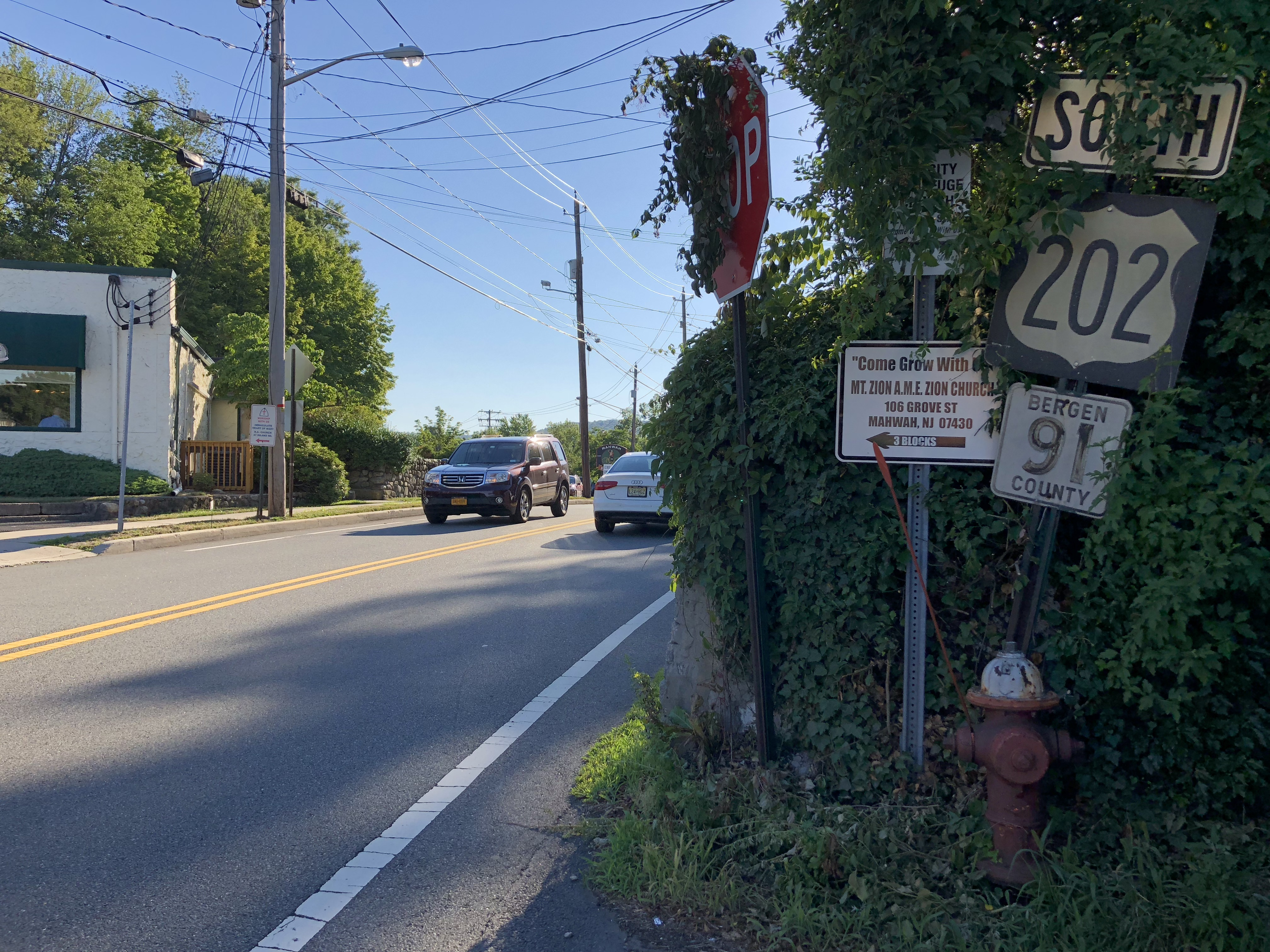
US 202 southbound in Mahwah, signed concurrent with CR 91

U.S. Route 202 crosses into Oakland, Bergen County, where the route becomes Ramapo Valley Road. In Bergen County, U.S. Route 202 is cosigned with County Route 91. In Oakland, the route turns east and passes the Long Hill Mall, where it makes a left turn to continue north along Ramapo Valley Road with County Route 93 continuing straight on Long Hill Road. U.S. Route 202 heads north through commercial areas of the town, where it passes by the Coppertree Mall, before crossing New York, Susquehanna and Western Railway's New Jersey Subdivision line and coming to an interchange with Interstate 287. In the vicinity of this interchange, the route is maintained by the state. Past the Interstate 287 interchange, the road continues northeast through residential areas, crossing into Mahwah. Here, the route parallels the Ramapo River again, which runs to the west of the road. U.S. Route 202 passes through wooded residential areas before passing by Ramapo College of New Jersey. It passes under Interstate 287 and continues northeast, coming to an interchange with Route 17. Past this interchange, U.S. Route 202 heads east and then north through more dense neighborhoods. It passes under a railroad line that serves as part of both NJ Transit’s Main Line and Bergen County Line before immediately coming to an intersection with County Route 507 (Franklin Turnpike). Here, U.S. Route 202 makes a left turn onto this road and heads 0.03 mi (0.05 km) north to the New York state line where it continues into Suffern, New York as Orange Avenue.

== History ==
Route 32
- Location: Bedminster–Wayne
- Existed: 1927–1953

The alignment of U.S. Route 202 followed portions of many historical roads, including the Tuckaraming Trail (later known as the Old York Road), a historical 18th-century road that linked Philadelphia to New York City; the Paterson-Hamburg Turnpike, which was chartered on March 3, 1806 to run from Passaic to the Pennsylvania border; and the Union Turnpike, which was chartered on February 23, 1804 to run from Morristown to the Pennsylvania border. Nearly all of the roads that would later become U.S. Route 202 were incorporated into the Tuxedo Trail, which stretched from Buckingham, PA, to Suffern, NY. When the original system of New Jersey state highways was established, the current routing of U.S. Route 202 was legislated as part of pre-1927 Route 5 between Morristown and present-day Route 53 in Morris Plains in 1916 and as part of pre-1927 Route 16 between Somerville and Morristown in 1921. In the 1927 New Jersey state highway renumbering, present-day U.S. Route 202 was legislated as part of Route 29 between Lambertville and Ringoes, Route 30 (now Route 31) between Ringoes and Flemington, Route 12 between Flemington and Somerville, Route 31 (now U.S. Route 206) between Somerville and Bedminster, Route 32 from Bedminster to Mountain View, and Route 23 through a portion of Wayne. Also, by 1927, U.S. Route 122 was signed to run from the New Hope-Lambertville Bridge over the Delaware River in Lambertville, where it continued south all the way to State Road, Delaware, to White House, following locally maintained Bridge Street in Lambertville, Route 29 between Lambertville and Ringoes, Route 30 between Ringoes and Flemington, and present-day County Route 523 from Flemington to U.S. Route 22 in White House.

Prior to the mid-1930s, US 202 was known as US 122

Eventually, Route 29 was realigned to follow present-day U.S. Route 202 between Ringoes and Somerville, replacing Route 12 between Flemington and Somerville. In 1934, U.S. Route 122 was renumbered to U.S. Route 202 and was extended to head to the New York border at Suffern, where it would continue to Bangor, Maine. U.S. Route 202 would follow proposed Route 29 from Flemington northeast to Somerville; proposed Route 31 north to Bedminster; Route 32 northeast to Mountain View, which was state maintained south of Route 5N (now Route 53) in Morris Plains; Route 23 in Wayne; and county roads from Route 23 northeast to the New York border. At the time, U.S. Route 202 would follow a temporary alignment between Flemington and Bedminster by way of White House and Lamington. In 1939, U.S. Route 202 was rerouted to follow its current alignment between Flemington and Bedminster along Route 29 between Flemington and Somerville and Route 31 between Somerville and Bedminster. In 1948, Bridge Street in Lambertville from the New Hope-Lambertville Bridge to Route 29 was designated as Route S29. In the 1953 New Jersey state highway renumbering, which eliminated long concurrencies between U.S. and state routes, many of the state routes that followed U.S. Route 202 were removed from the route. Route 29 was removed from U.S. Route 202 and rerouted to follow former Route 29A to Frenchtown, and Routes S29, 31, and 32 were entirely eliminated. In addition, Route 30 was renumbered to Route 69 as it conflicted with U.S. Route 30 in southern New Jersey.

On June 13, 1950, the New Jersey Legislature designated US 202 as the Thomas Paine Highway, in honor of American Founding Father Thomas Paine.

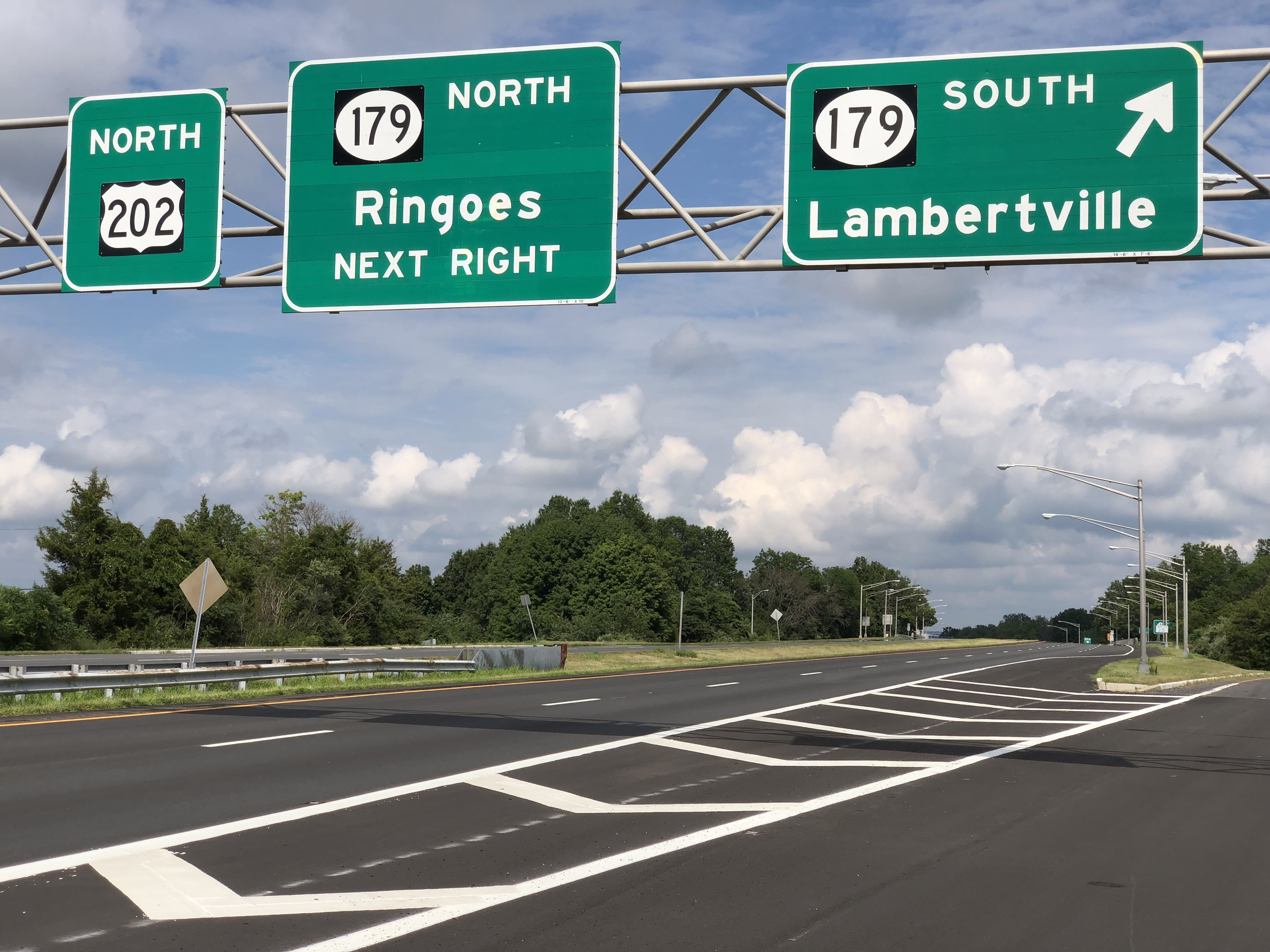
US 202 northbound at the Route 179 interchange in Ringoes

Plans for a limited-access highway along the U.S. Route 202 corridor date back to 1932 when a parkway was planned to continue into Pennsylvania along U.S. Route 202; this proposal never came to fruition. In the 1960s, a bypass around Ringoes opened for U.S. Route 202 and Route 69 (which became Route 31 in 1967) with the former alignment of U.S. Route 202 through town becoming Route 179. In 1966, a freeway was proposed along the U.S. Route 202 corridor between the Pennsylvania border and Interstate 287 in Bridgewater Township. The portion of this freeway between the Pennsylvania border and the Route 179 interchange in Ringoes was legislated in 1969 with the New Hope–Lambertville Toll Bridge opening in 1971. The freeway opened in October 1974, and the former alignment of U.S. Route 202 between Lambertville and Ringoes became an extension of Route 179. Meanwhile, the portion of the proposed U.S. Route 202 freeway between Lambertville and Bridgewater Township was cancelled due to opposition from residents along the route.

In the 1980s, upgrades were made to the portion of U.S. Route 202 concurrent with Route 23. This portion of road, which was originally a four-lane surface road, saw an upgrade to a six-lane freeway south of the Alps Road interchange and to a six-lane arterial road north of there. Construction on these improvements was completed in 1986.

In September 1991 construction began on a project to improve the Somerville circle. The project included an overpass that allows Route 202 to bypass the circle, and the inclusion of traffic signals. The project was completed in 1994. In the year after the overpass opened the circle saw 302 traffic accidents. In an attempt to lower the accident rate the New Jersey Department of Transportation installed yield ahead signs for approaching vehicles in February 1995. The signs made little difference and the accident rate remained high. Another attempt to make the circle safer came in November when the Transportation Department painted lane lines and arrows on the roads and replaced a yield sign with a stop sign. The new changes resulted in fewer accidents.

In the 2000s, there were plans to replace the Flemington Circle with an interchange as part of a project that would have also built a limited-access bypass of Flemington for Route 31; however, this plan was never realized. Instead, the circle was rebuilt in 2016 with new ramps.

== Major intersections ==
County	Location	mi	km	Destinations	Notes
Delaware River		0.00	0.00	US 202 south – Pennsylvania	Continuation into Pennsylvania
Delaware River		0.00	0.00	New Hope–Lambertville Toll Bridge (southbound toll in Pennsylvania)	
Hunterdon	Delaware Township	0.35	0.56	Route 29 – Lambertville, Stockton	Last southbound exit before toll
Hunterdon	West Amwell Township	2.81	4.52	CR 605 – Mt. Airy, Dilts Corner	
Hunterdon	East Amwell Township	4.98	8.01	Route 179 – Lambertville, Ringoes	
Hunterdon	East Amwell Township	5.70	9.17	Route 31 south / CR 579 – Trenton	Southern end of Route 31 concurrency
Hunterdon	East Amwell Township			Northern end of freeway section	
Hunterdon	East Amwell Township	6.95	11.18	Route 179 south / CR 514 east (Old York Road) – Ringoes, Reaville	Northern terminus of Route 179; western terminus of CR 514
Hunterdon	Flemington	11.44	18.41	Route 12 west / Route 31 north – Flemington, Frenchtown, Clinton	Flemington Circle; northern end of Route 31 concurrency; eastern terminus of Route 12
Somerset	Raritan	23.90	38.46	CR 567 (First Avenue) – Raritan	
Somerset	Raritan–Bridgewater Township line	24.43	39.32	US 206 south / Route 28 (Easton Turnpike / West End Avenue) – Somerville, Princeton	Interchange; former Somerville Circle; southern end of US 206 concurrency
Somerset	Bridgewater Township	25.03	40.28	US 22 to I-287 south – Clinton, New York City	Interchange
Somerset	Bridgewater Township	25.50	41.04	Commons Way	Interchange
Somerset	Bridgewater Township	25.88	41.65	I-287 north to I-78 – Netcong, Morristown	Northbound exit and southbound entrance; exit 17 on I-287
Somerset	Bedminster Township	30.51	49.10	I-287	Exit 22 on I-287
Somerset	Bedminster Township	31.04	49.95	AT&T Way	Interchange; no southbound exit
Somerset	Bedminster Township	31.51	50.71	US 206 north – Chester, Netcong	Northern end of US 206 concurrency
Somerset	Bedminster Township	32.13	51.71	CR 523 south (Main Street) – Lamington	Northern terminus of CR 523
Somerset	Far Hills	32.60	52.46	CR 512 west (Peapack Road) – Peapack	Southern end of CR 512 concurrency
Somerset	Far Hills	32.88	52.92	CR 512 east (Far Hills Road) – Summit	Northern end of CR 512 concurrency
Somerset	Bernardsville	36.97	59.50	CR 525 north (Claremont Road) – Mendham	Southern end of CR 525 concurrency
Somerset	Bernardsville	37.10	59.71	CR 525 south (Mt. Airy Road) – Bernards	Northern end of CR 525 concurrency
Morris	Morristown	44.53	71.66	Route 124 east (South Street) / CR 510 west (West Park Place) – Madison	Morristown Green; southern end of CR 510 concurrency; western terminus of Route 124
Morris	Morristown	44.60	71.78	CR 510 east (Morris Street)	Morristown Green; northern end of CR 510 concurrency
Morris	Morris Plains	46.99	75.62	Route 53 north (Tabor Road)	Southern terminus of Route 53
Morris	Parsippany–Troy Hills	48.23	77.62	Route 10 – Denville, Livingston	
Morris	Parsippany–Troy Hills	50.46	81.21	I-80 – Delaware Water Gap, New York City	Exit 42 on I-80
Morris	Parsippany–Troy Hills	51.14	82.30	CR 511 south (Parsippany Road)	Southern end of CR 511 concurrency
Morris	Parsippany–Troy Hills	51.53	82.93	US 46 – Dover, Clifton	
Morris	Parsippany–Troy Hills	51.82	83.40	I-287 south – Morristown	Exit 42 on I-287
Morris	Parsippany–Troy Hills	53.16	85.55	I-287 south to I-80 – Morristown	Exit 43 on I-287
Morris	Boonton	54.22	87.26	I-287 south	Exit 44 on I-287
Morris	Boonton	54.24	87.29	CR 511 north (Main Street)	Northern end of CR 511 concurrency
Morris	Boonton	54.47– 55.07	87.66– 88.63	I-287 south	Exit 45 on I-287
Morris	Montville	56.69	91.23	I-287	Exit 47 on I-287
Morris	Lincoln Park	60.59	97.51	CR 511 Alt. north (Comly Road)	Southern end of CR 511 Alt. concurrency
Passaic	Wayne	62.95	101.31	Southern end of freeway section	
Passaic	Wayne	62.95	101.31	Route 23 south / CR 511 Alt. south – Verona	Northern end of CR 511 Alt. concurrency; southern end of Route 23 concurrency
Passaic	Wayne	63.34	101.94	Alps Road (CR 670 north)	
Passaic	Wayne	63.34	101.94	Northern end of freeway section	
Passaic	Wayne	63.81	102.69	Newark-Pompton Turnpike (CR 683 north) – Pequannock	Interchange
Passaic	Wayne	65.07	104.72	Route 23 north / CR 504 west (Black Oak Ridge Road)	Northern end of Route 23 concurrency; southern end of CR 504 concurrency
Passaic	Wayne	65.40	105.25	CR 504 east (Ratzer Road)	Northern end of CR 504 concurrency
Bergen	Oakland	72.54	116.74	I-287 to Route 208 south	Exit 58 on I-287; former Route 208
Bergen	Mahwah	79.30	127.62	Route 17	Interchange
Bergen	Mahwah	80.27	129.18	CR 507 south (Franklin Turnpike) – Hackensack	Southern end of CR 507 concurrency
Bergen	Mahwah	80.31	129.25	US 202 east (Orange Avenue) CR 507 ends	Continuation into New York; northern terminus of CR 507
1.000 mi = 1.609 km; 1.000 km = 0.621 mi: Concurrency terminus; Incomplete access; Tolled

== See also ==
- List of county routes in Bergen County, New Jersey
- List of county routes in Morris County, New Jersey
- List of county routes in Passaic County, New Jersey

U.S. Route 202
Previous state: Pennsylvania	New Jersey	Next state: New York
