= New Hope–Lambertville Bridge =

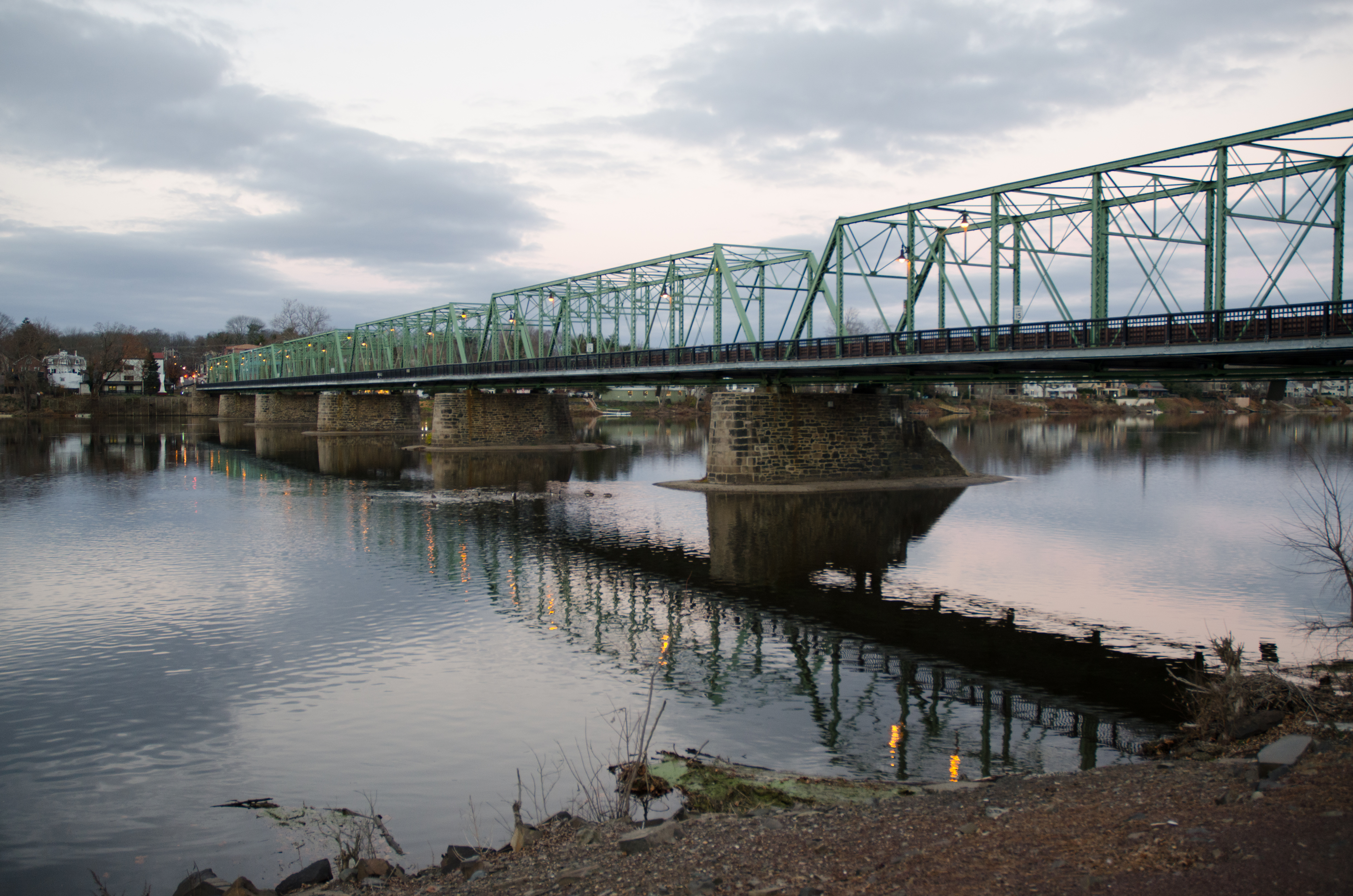
- New Hope–Lambertville Bridge crossing the Delaware River between New Jersey and Pennsylvania
- Coordinates: 40°21′54″N 74°56′55″W
- Carries: 2 lanes of Route 179 (NJ side) / PA 179 (PA side)
- Crosses: Delaware River
- Locale: Lambertville, New Jersey and New Hope, Pennsylvania
- Official name: New Hope-Lambertville Toll Supported Bridge
- Maintained by: Delaware River Joint Toll Bridge Commission

Characteristics
- Design: Truss bridge
- Total length: 1,053 feet (321 m)
- Width: 23 feet (7 m)
- Longest span: 171 feet (52 m)
- Load limit: 4 tons
- Clearance below: 13 feet (4 m)

History
- Opened: August 22, 1904

Statistics
- Daily traffic: 13,900
- Toll: None

Location
- Interactive map of New Hope–Lambertville Bridge

The New Hope–Lambertville Bridge, officially called the New Hope–Lambertville Toll Supported Bridge, is a six-span, 1,053-foot (321 m)-long bridge spanning the Delaware River that connects Lambertville, New Jersey and New Hope, Pennsylvania. The current steel truss bridge was constructed in 1904 at a cost of $63,818.81. It is owned and maintained as a toll-free bridge by the Delaware River Joint Toll Bridge Commission.

== Structure ==
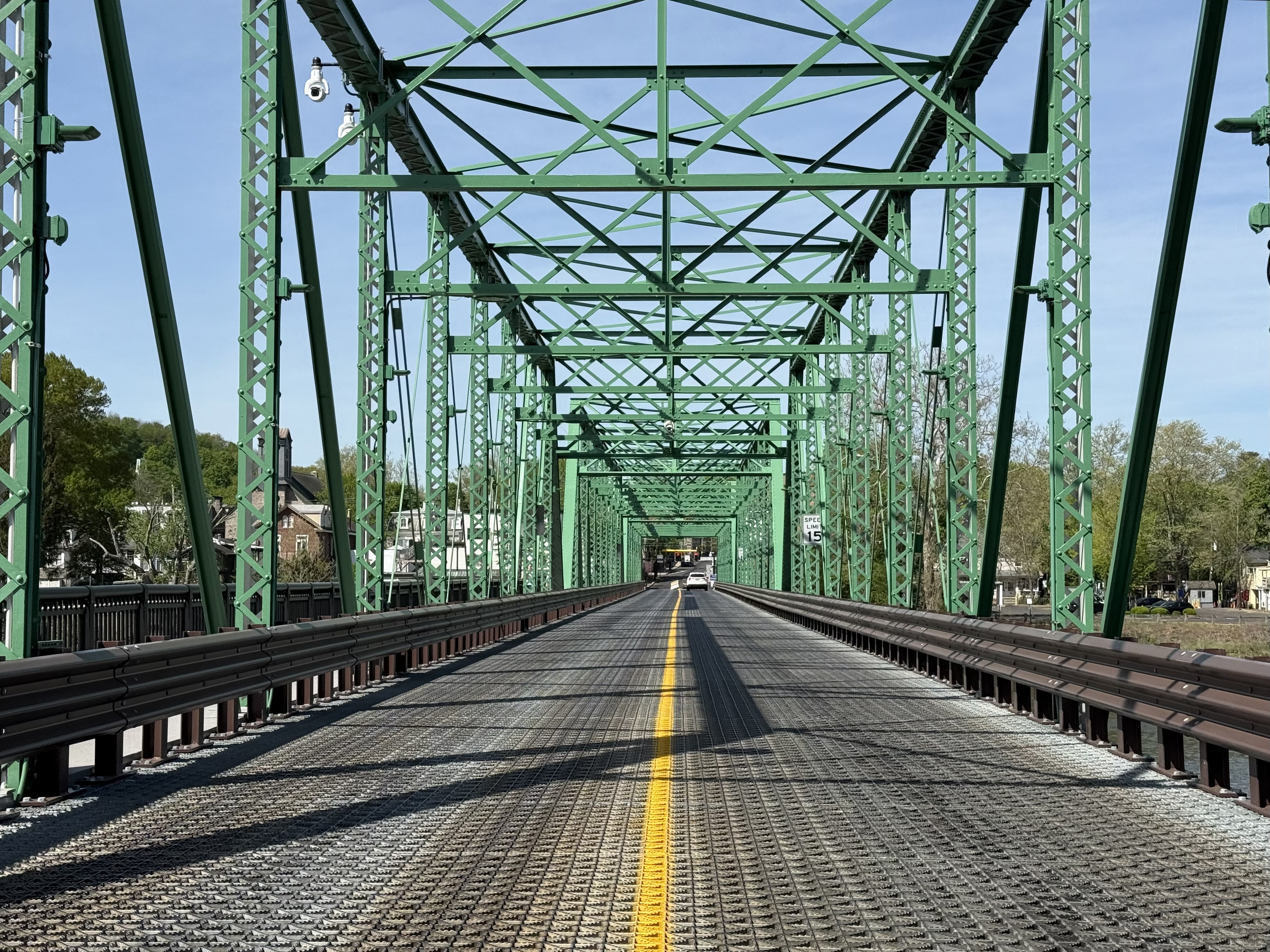
Mid-span view, looking toward Pennsylvania

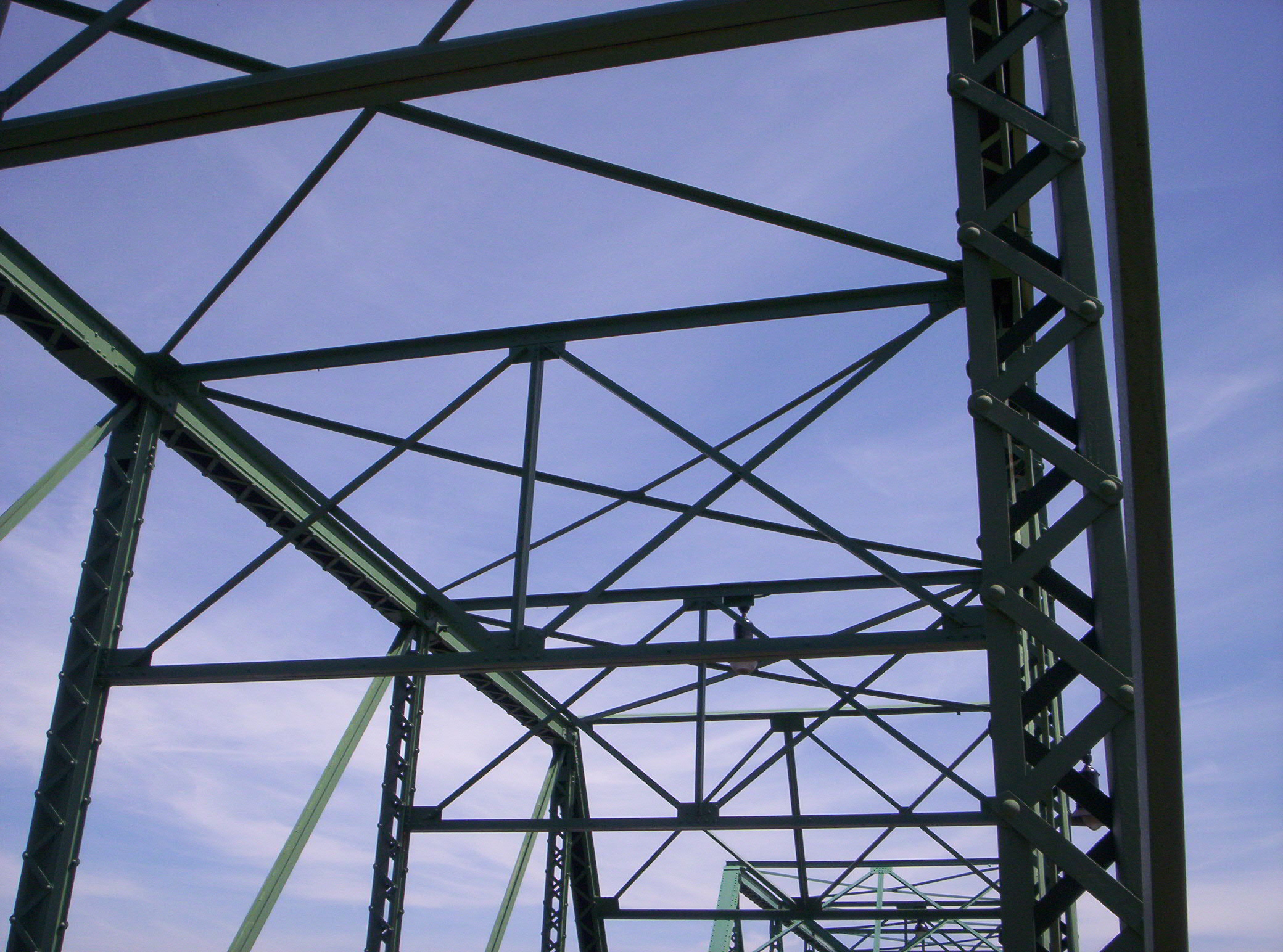
The bridge's truss members and upper chords

The New Hope–Lambertville's vertical truss members are 27 feet (8.2 m) in height. Three of its piers are stone filled and built on timber cribbing. The bridge's abutment, which is from the 1814 bridge, is square blocked masonry. Finally, utilities on the bridge include lighting for the walkway and an eight-inch (203 mm) diameter sewer line.

== History ==
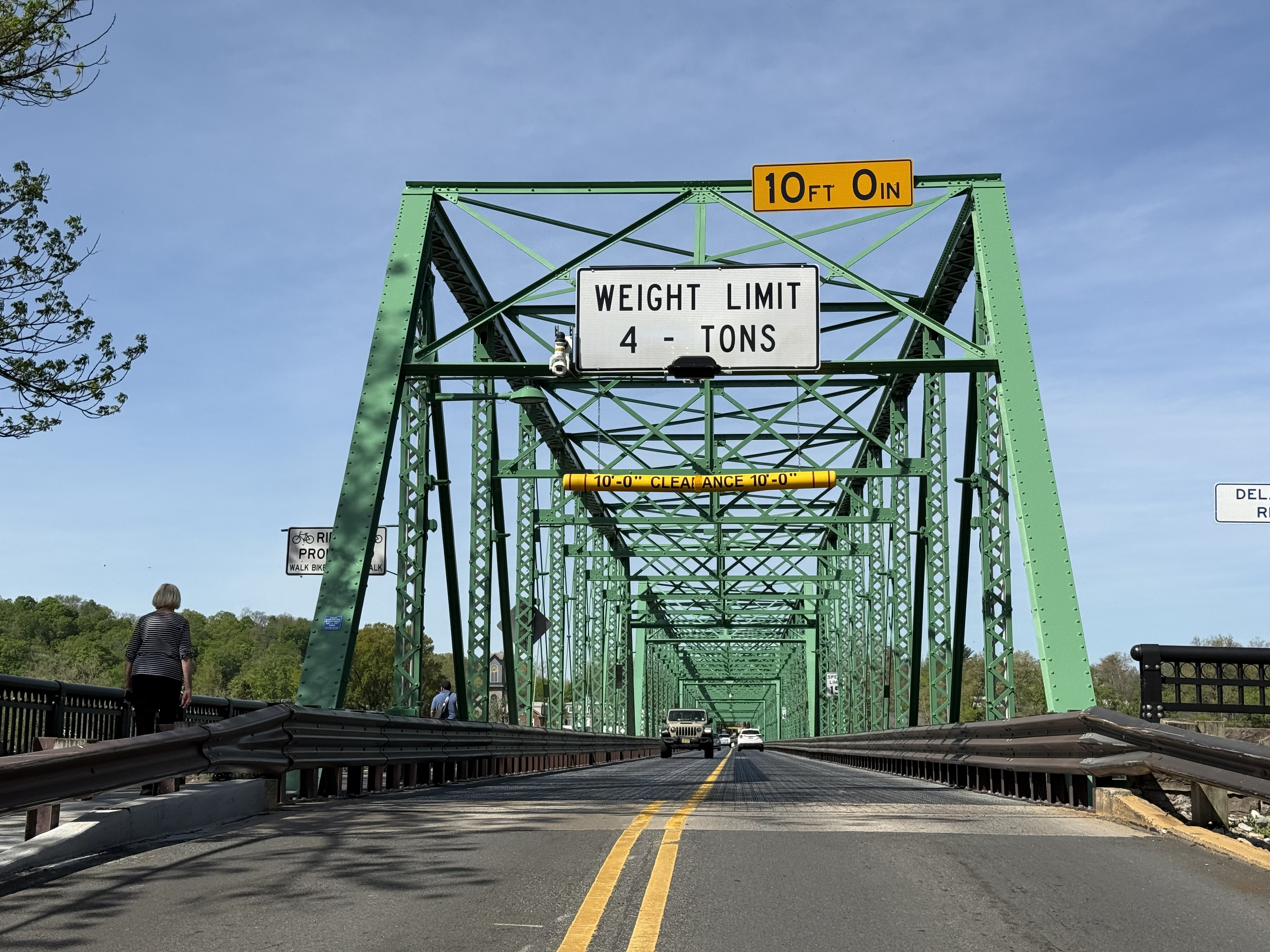
The New Jersey terminus

The original 1,051-foot (320 m)-long and 32-foot (9.8 m)-wide wooden covered bridge was built on September 12, 1814, replacing the service once provided by Coryell's Ferry. Its six wooden arches each measured 175 feet (53 m) long and 13 feet (4.0 m) high. Its designer, Lewis Wernwag, was nationally known for his covered bridges. The flood of 1841 heavily damaged the original bridge. A second wooden covered bridge was constructed in 1842, but was destroyed during the flood of 1903. As was the case with several of the Delaware River's other bridges at the time, the flood encouraged replacing the wooden structure with a modern steel bridge. Thus, the superstructure of the New Hope–Lambertville Bridge dates to 1904, when its steel truss spans were first built. The cost of the 1904 bridge was $63,818.81, several thousand dollars less than the $67,936.37 needed to build the 1814 structure.

In 1919, the Commission For the Elimination of Toll Bridges bought the bridge, freeing the financially struggling private company from its obligations. The bridge has been toll-free since that time.

Prior to 1934, trolleys of the New Jersey and Pennsylvania Traction Company, and later the Trenton-Princeton Traction Company, used the New Hope–Lambertville Bridge to cross back into New Jersey.

The New Hope–Lambertville Bridge was one of the few structures not devastated by the flood of 1955, the greatest that the Delaware River had ever experienced. It did, however, require about a month of repairs, reopening on September 22, 1955.

For many years the New Hope–Lambertville Bridge carried U.S. Route 202 over the Delaware River. However, in 1971, U.S. Route 202 was realigned at Magill's Hill between the Rabbit Run Canal bridge and the Phillip's Mill community on the Pennsylvania side. The New Hope-Lambertville Toll Bridge currently carries Route 202, while the New Hope–Lambertville Toll Supported Bridge connects the re-designated Pennsylvania Route 179 with New Jersey Route 179.

As part of its celebration of the 100th anniversary of the New Hope–Lambertville Bridge in 2004, the Delaware River Joint Toll Bridge Commission announced the completion of a major revitalization project that had begun in late 2003. The contract had been awarded to J.D. Eckman, Inc. for the amount of $6,249,207.50. Renovations included improving the pedestrian walkway with new flooring and lighting, fixing the bridge's sewer line, replacing steel members, and blast-cleaning and painting the bridge's structural steel. During construction, bridge traffic fell to 9,700. Beginning in January 2004, shuttle service was offered at no cost to travelers. The bridge reopened June 7, 2004, one week ahead of schedule, and was named "2004 Project of the Year" by the Delaware Valley Section of the American Society of Highway Engineers. The final cost of the project was $6,305,269.

== Sources ==
- Richman, Steven M. (2003). The Bridges of New Jersey, New Brunswick: Rutgers University Press. Pages 78–79. ISBN 0-8135-3510-7.
