= New Jersey Route 53 =

State highway in Morris County, New Jersey, US

Route 53

Route information
- Maintained by NJDOT
- Length: 4.66 mi (7.50 km)
- Existed: January 1, 1953–present

Major junctions
- South end: US 202 in Morris Plains
- Route 10 in Parsippany–Troy Hills
- North end: I-80 / US 46 in Denville Township

Location
- Country: United States
- State: New Jersey
- Counties: Morris

Highway system
- New Jersey State Highway Routes; Interstate; US; State; Scenic Byways
← Route 52	→ Route 54
← Route 177	→ Route 179

Route 53 is a state highway in Morris County in the U.S. state of New Jersey. It runs 4.66 mi (7.50 km) from U.S. Route 202 in Morris Plains north to U.S. Route 46 (US 46) in Denville Township. The route, which is a two-lane undivided highway most of its length, intersects with Route 10 and Interstate 80 (I-80). For most of its length, the route runs a short distance to the east of New Jersey Transit's Morristown Line. It passes through industrial areas and wooded residential neighborhoods along its route.

From 1916 to 1927, the route was a part of pre-1927 Route 5, which ran from Delaware in Warren County east to Newark. In 1927, the portion of pre-1927 Route 5 that is today Route 53 was not made a part of a different route and became Route 5N to distinguish it from a newly created Route 5. In 1953, the route became Route 53. A freeway was planned for the route in 1966, running from a planned Route 24 freeway in Morris Plains north to a planned Route 208 freeway in Greenwood Lake in Passaic County. This planned freeway was scaled back in 1967 to end at I-80. It was later designated Route 178 before being canceled in 1975.

== Route description ==
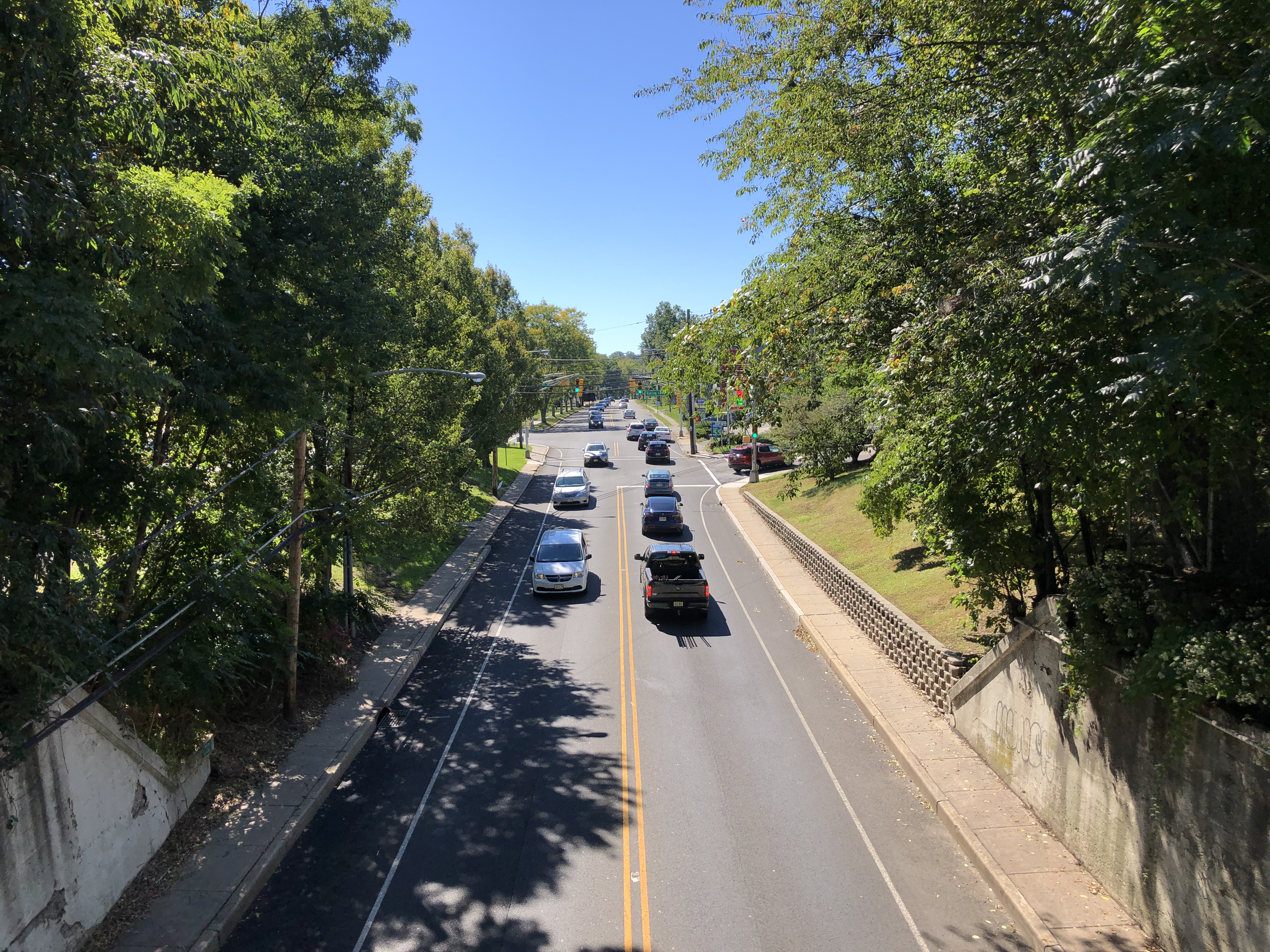
View southbound along Route 53 from the Montclair-Boonton Line in Denville Township

Route 53 begins at an intersection with US 202 (Littleton Road) in Morris Plains. It proceeds north as Tabor Road, a two-lane undivided road closely paralleling New Jersey Transit’s Morristown Line, which runs along the west side of the route. Route 53 bends farther east from the tracks and runs through an industrial area. After passing through the industrial area, the road heads through wooded residential areas, passing under a set of power lines. Further north, Route 53 comes to an interchange with Route 10.

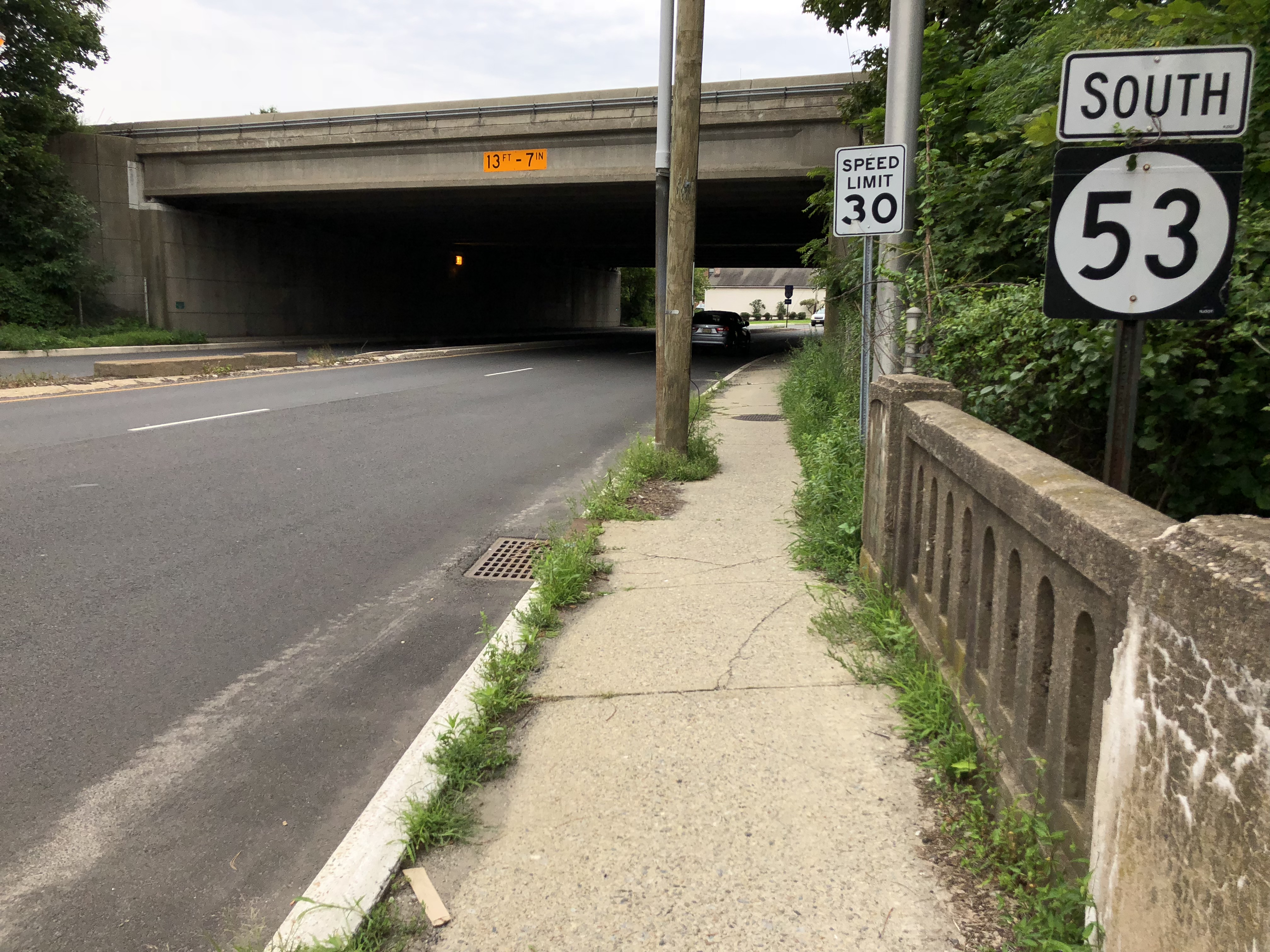
View south at the north end of Route 53 at US 46 in Denville

Past the Route 10 interchange, the road enters Parsippany–Troy Hills and continues north through wooded residential neighborhoods, running parallel to I-80 while passing to the east of a couple small lakes. It begins to turn northwest before passing by the Mount Tabor Country Club. Route 53 continues north through Mount Tabor before crossing into Denville Township, where the route becomes East Main Street. In Denville, the route passes under New Jersey Transit's Montclair-Boonton Line near Denville station. Route 53 then comes to an interchange with I-80, where the route becomes a four-lane, divided highway, after which the route terminates at an interchange with US 46.

== History ==
Route 5N
- Location: Morris Plains–Denville
- Existed: 1927–1953

What is now Route 53 was once part of a Lenape trail running from Morristown to Denville Township. In 1916, present-day Route 53 was designated as part of pre-1927 Route 5, which ran from Delaware in Warren County east to Newark. In the 1927 New Jersey state highway renumbering, this route became Route 6 (now US 46) between Delaware and Denville, Route 32 (now US 202) between Morris Plains and Morristown, and Route 24 (now Route 124) between Morristown and Newark. The portion of pre-1927 Route 5 between Morris Plains and Denville, however, was not replaced by a different route and became Route 5N to distinguish it from a newly created Route 5. The northern terminus of Route 5N was at US 46/Route 6 (Bloomfield Avenue) in Denville Township; when those routes were moved to a bypass, Route 5N's northern terminus remained at Bloomfield Avenue. In the 1953 New Jersey state highway renumbering, Route 5N was renumbered to Route w53.

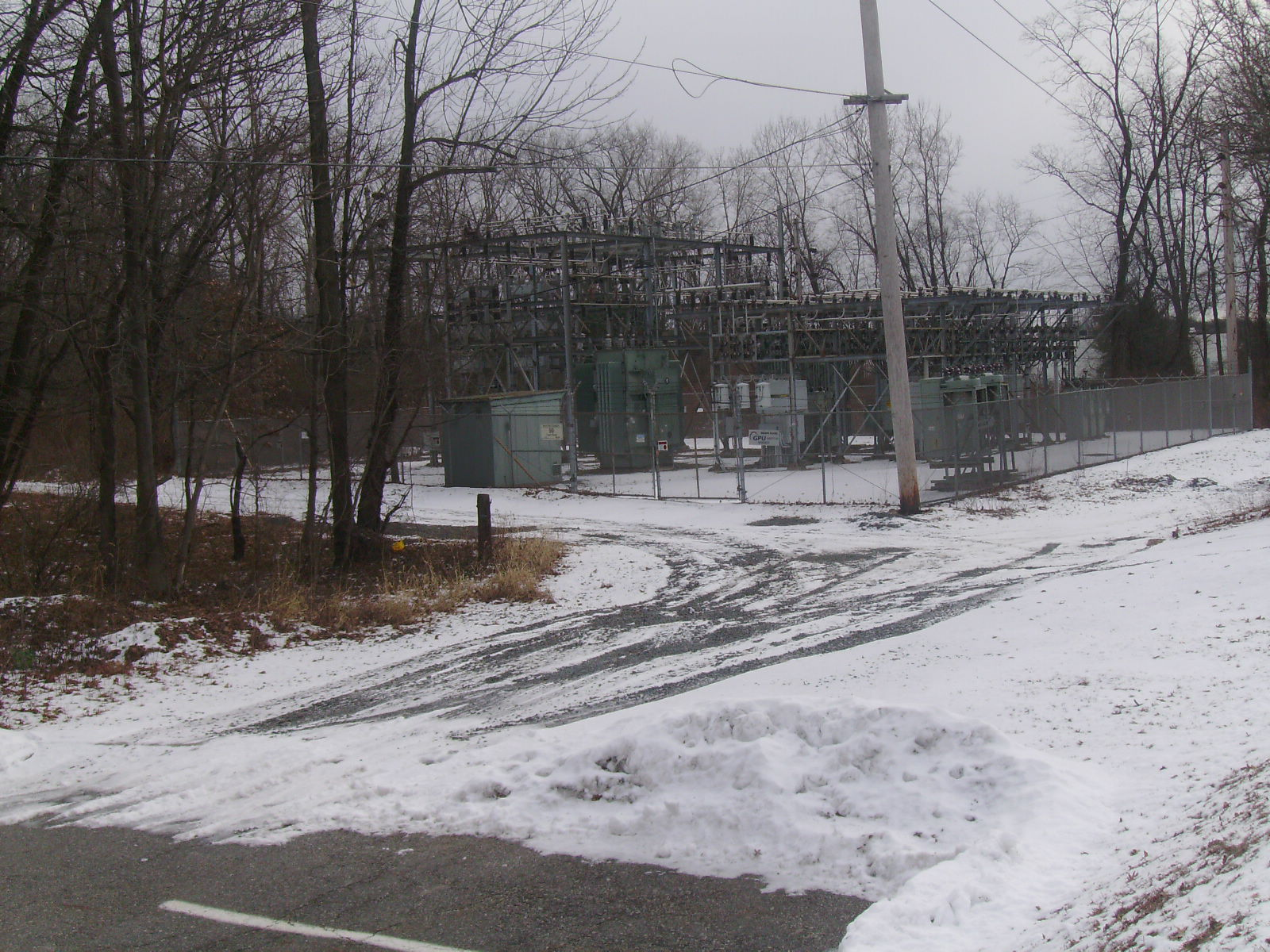
Route 178 right-of-way in Morris Plains behind the namesake Morris Plains station

In 1966, a freeway was planned for the Route 53 corridor, intended to reduce traffic congestion. The freeway was intended to run from a planned Route 24 freeway in Morris Plains and continue north, crossing I-80 and Route 23 before ending at a planned Route 208 freeway near Greenwood Lake in Passaic County that would connect to the New York State Route 208 freeway that was to continue north into Orange County, New York. In 1967, the northern terminus of the Route 53 freeway was cut back to I-80. This freeway was designated Route 178 in 1969. Right-of-way acquisition began for the freeway but was stopped in 1971 due to lack of funds. The freeway was officially cancelled in 1975 when NJDOT did not include it in the five-year highway program. Despite the cancellation of the proposed freeway, several large corporations in Morris County pushed for the freeway to be built as it would reduce commuter traffic on Route 53 and US 202 in the area.

== Major intersections ==
The entire route is in Morris County.

Location	mi	km	Destinations	Notes
Morris Plains	0.00	0.00	US 202 (Littleton Road) – Morristown, Somerville	Southern terminus
Parsippany–Troy Hills	1.54	2.48	Route 10 – Dover, Whippany, Newark	Interchange
Denville Township	4.56	7.34	I-80 east	Exit 39 on I-80
Denville Township	4.66	7.50	US 46 to I-80 west	Interchange; northern terminus
1.000 mi = 1.609 km; 1.000 km = 0.621 mi
