= Reaville, New Jersey =

Populated place in Hunterdon County, New Jersey, US

- Unincorporated community
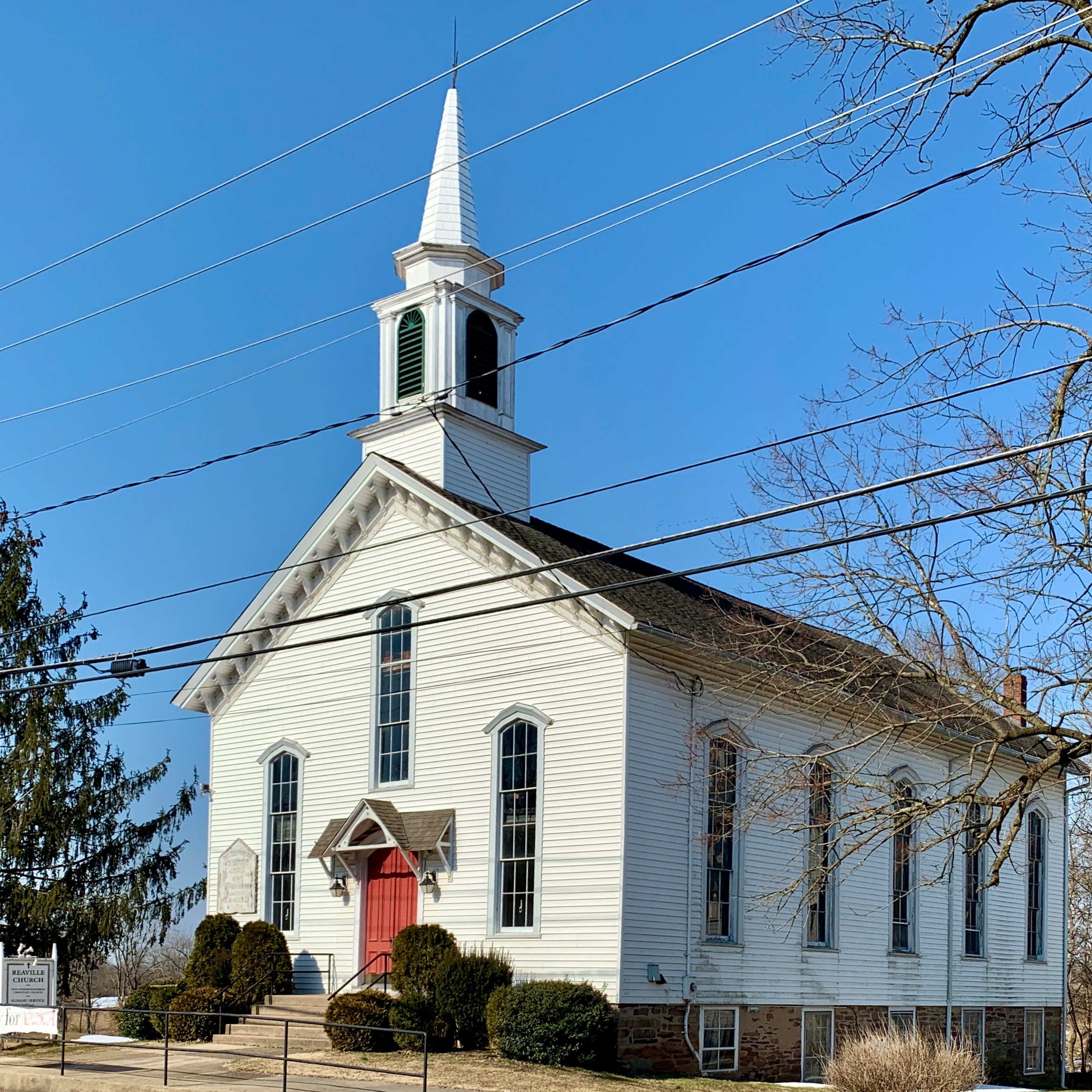
- Reaville Church

- Location within Hunterdon County, New Jersey Location within New Jersey Location within the United States
- Coordinates: 40°28′42″N 74°49′00″W
- Country: United States
- State: New Jersey
- County: Hunterdon
- Township: East Amwell and Raritan
- Elevation: 177 ft (54 m)
- GNIS feature ID: 879629

Reaville is an unincorporated community located along the border of East Amwell and Raritan townships in Hunterdon County, New Jersey. By the 1830s, it was known as Greenville. It was later renamed after Runkle Rea, the first postmaster in 1850.

== History ==
In the 18th century, Reaville was a stop on the stagecoach route along the Old York Road. A school had been located in Reaville. By 1881, a harness shop was the only business located there.

== Historic district ==
- Reaville Historic District
- U.S. National Register of Historic Places
- U.S. Historic district
- New Jersey Register of Historic Places
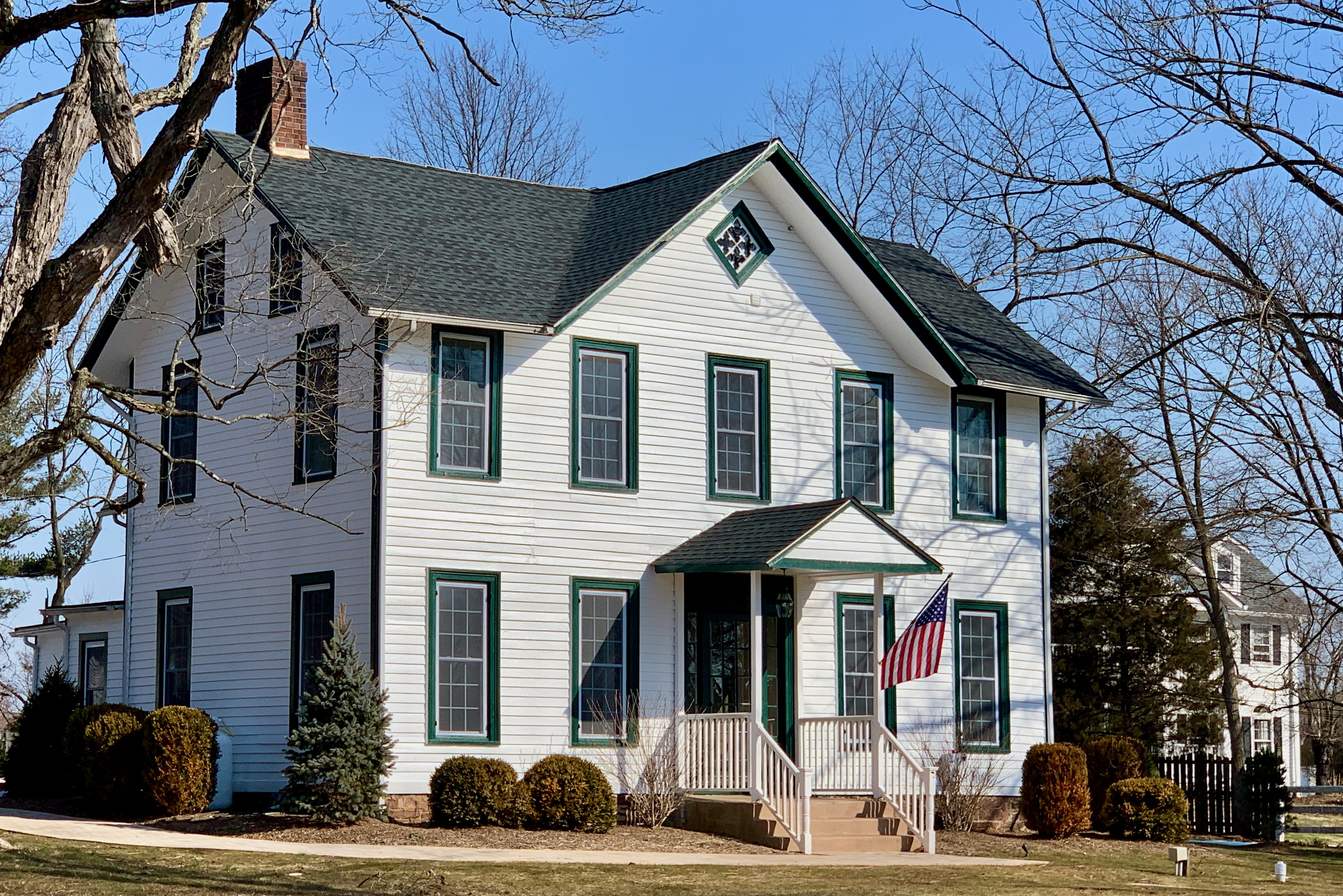
- Amwell Presbyterian Church Parsonage
- Location: Old York, Amwell, Barley Sheaf, Kuhl, and Manners Roads
- Area: 159 acres (64 ha)
- Architectural style: Federal, Greek Revival
- NRHP reference No.: 02000433
- NJRHP No.: 3949

Significant dates
- Added to NRHP: May 2, 2002
- Designated NJRHP: December 20, 2001

The Reaville Historic District is a 159-acre (64 ha) historic district encompassing the community along Old York, Amwell, Barley Sheaf, Kuhl, and Manners roads. It was added to the National Register of Historic Places on May 2, 2002 for its significance in architecture, commerce, and community development. The district includes 32 contributing buildings.

The Reaville Church, formerly known as the First English Presbyterian Church, was built in 1839 and remodeled in 1883. It features Federal architecture with Greek Revival influences. The Amwell Presbyterian Church Parsonage was built in 1865 with Gothic Revival influences and features a diamond-shaped window with quatrefoil tracery.

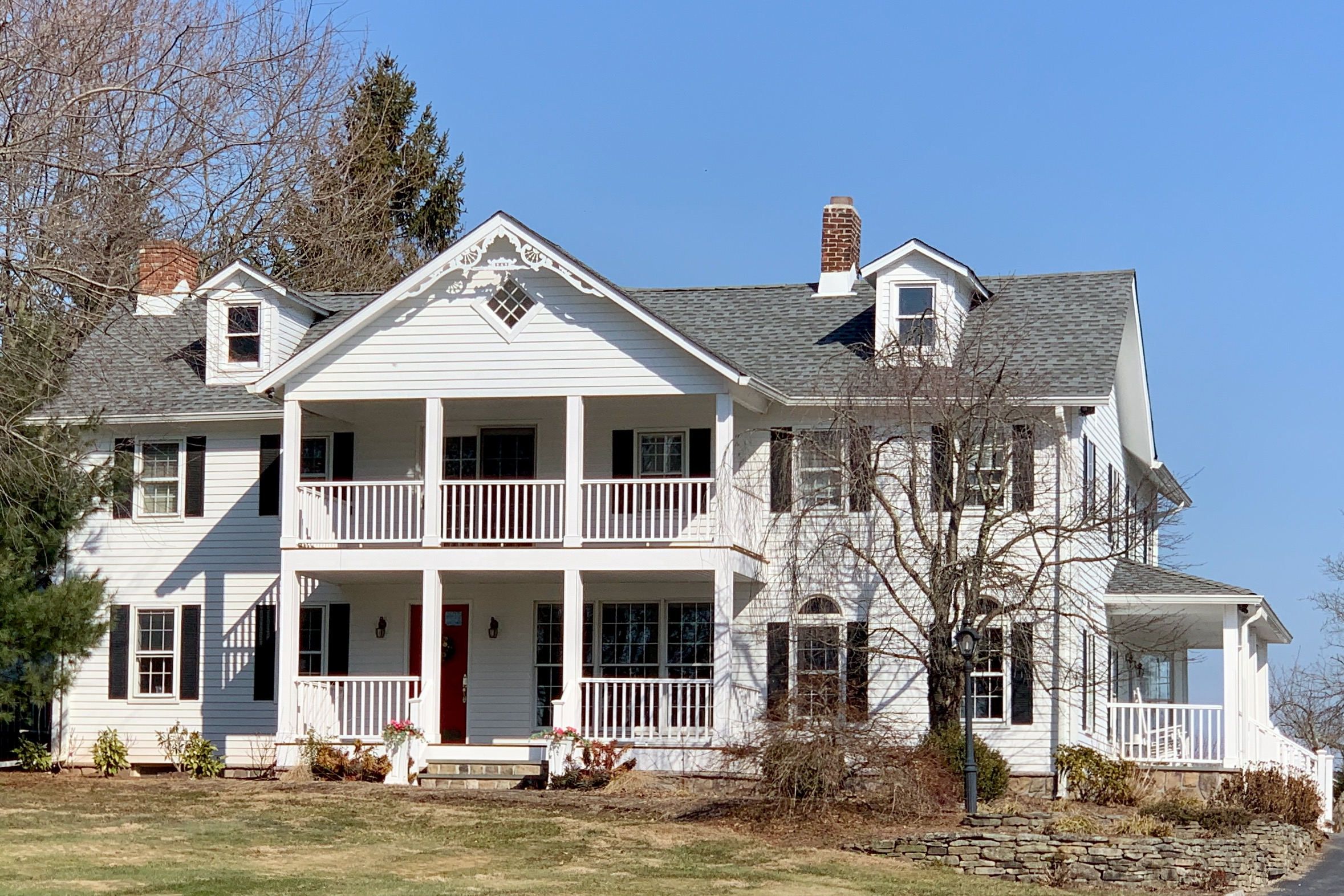
Colonial Revival style house on Amwell Road

== Transportation ==
County Route 514 enters the community along Old York Road from Ringoes and leaves along Amwell Road toward Neshanic.

== See also ==
- National Register of Historic Places listings in Hunterdon County, New Jersey
