= New Hope–Lambertville Toll Bridge =

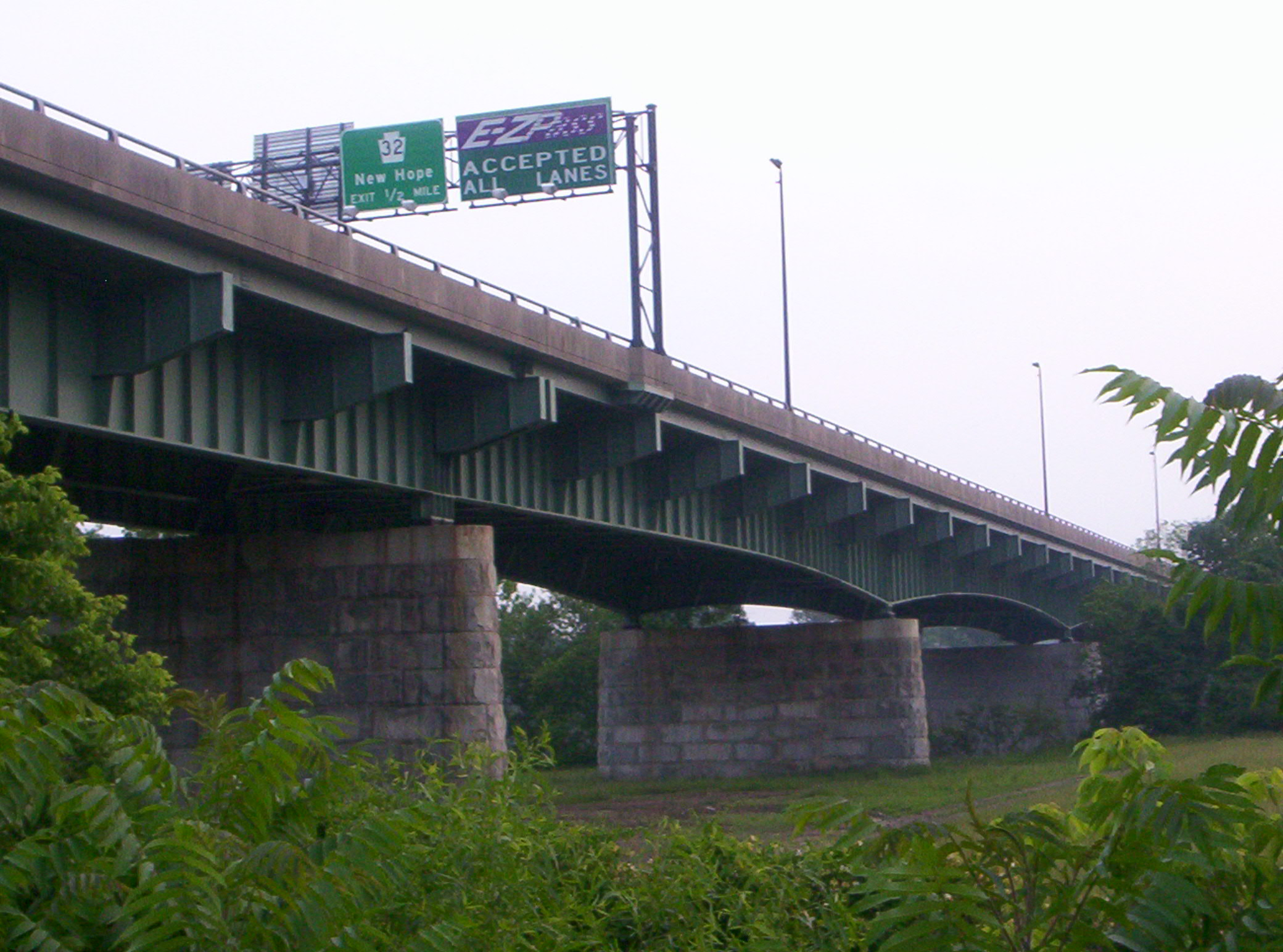
- Coordinates: 40°22′45.48″N 74°57′19.8″W
- Carries: 4 lanes of US 202
- Crosses: Delaware River
- Locale: Delaware Township, New Jersey and Solebury Township, Pennsylvania
- Official name: New Hope-Lambertville Route 202 Toll Bridge
- Maintained by: Delaware River Joint Toll Bridge Commission

Characteristics
- Design: Girder
- Total length: 1,682 feet (513 m)

History
- Opened: July 22, 1971

Statistics
- Daily traffic: 9,700
- Toll: Southbound (New Jersey to Pennsylvania): $5.00 for cars without E-ZPass $2.00 for cars with E-ZPass

Location
- Interactive map of New Hope–Lambertville Toll Bridge

The New Hope–Lambertville Toll Bridge carries U.S. Route 202 (US 202) over the Delaware River, connecting Delaware Township in Hunterdon County, New Jersey, with Solebury Township in Bucks County, Pennsylvania, United States. The bridge, which opened in 1971, was built and is currently operated by the Delaware River Joint Toll Bridge Commission. The commission is also responsible for maintenance and operation of the interchanges with Route 29 in New Jersey and Pennsylvania Route 32 (PA 32) on the Pennsylvania side.

== History ==
The bridge, part of an $8 million project approved in 1967, opened on July 22, 1971, in ceremonies attended by Governor of New Jersey William T. Cahill. Following completion, the bridge was connected to local routes via temporary roads. Not until 1975 was US 202 realigned so as to incorporate the new toll bridge.

== Structure ==
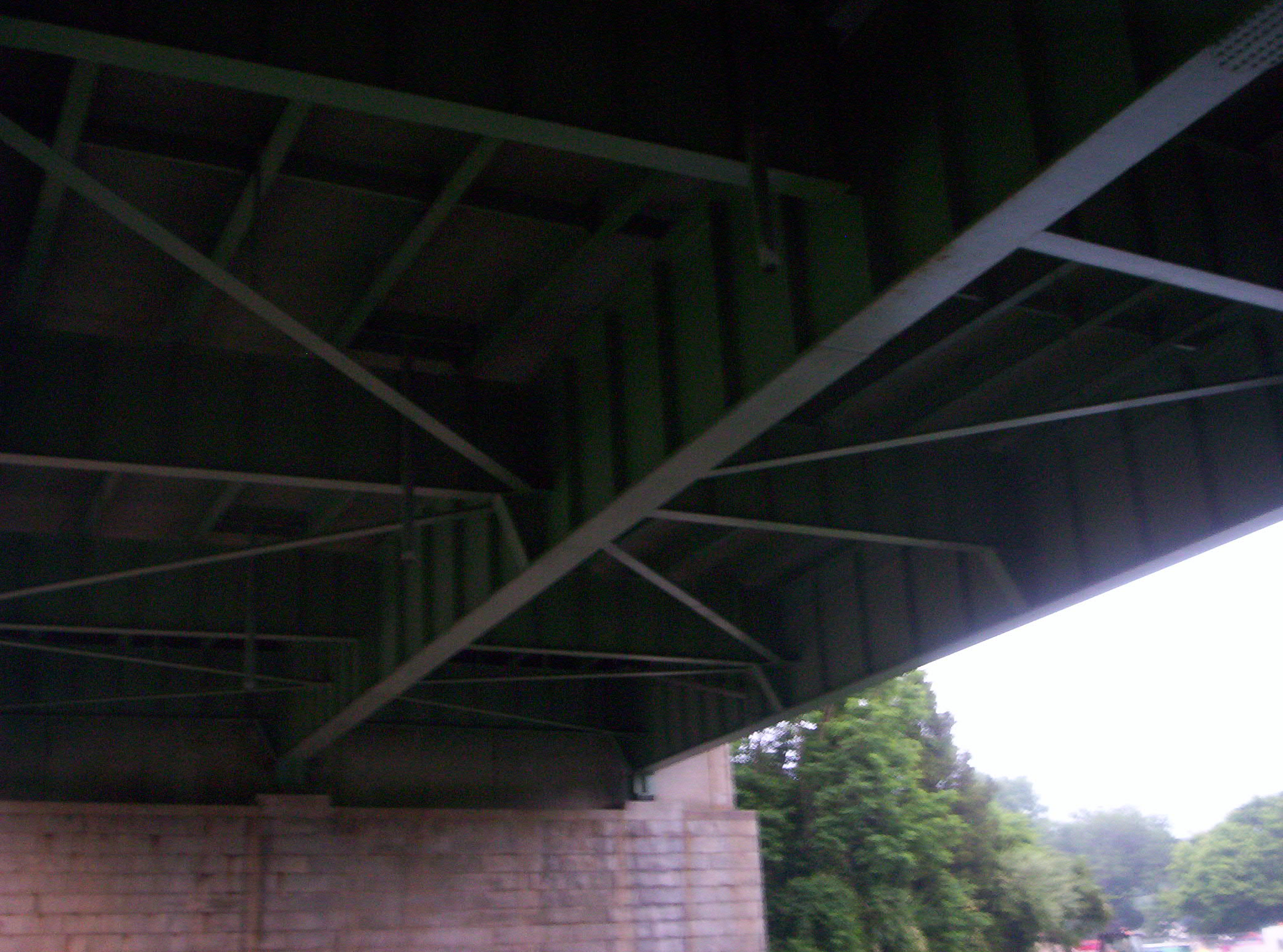
The girder structure of the bridge, as viewed from underneath

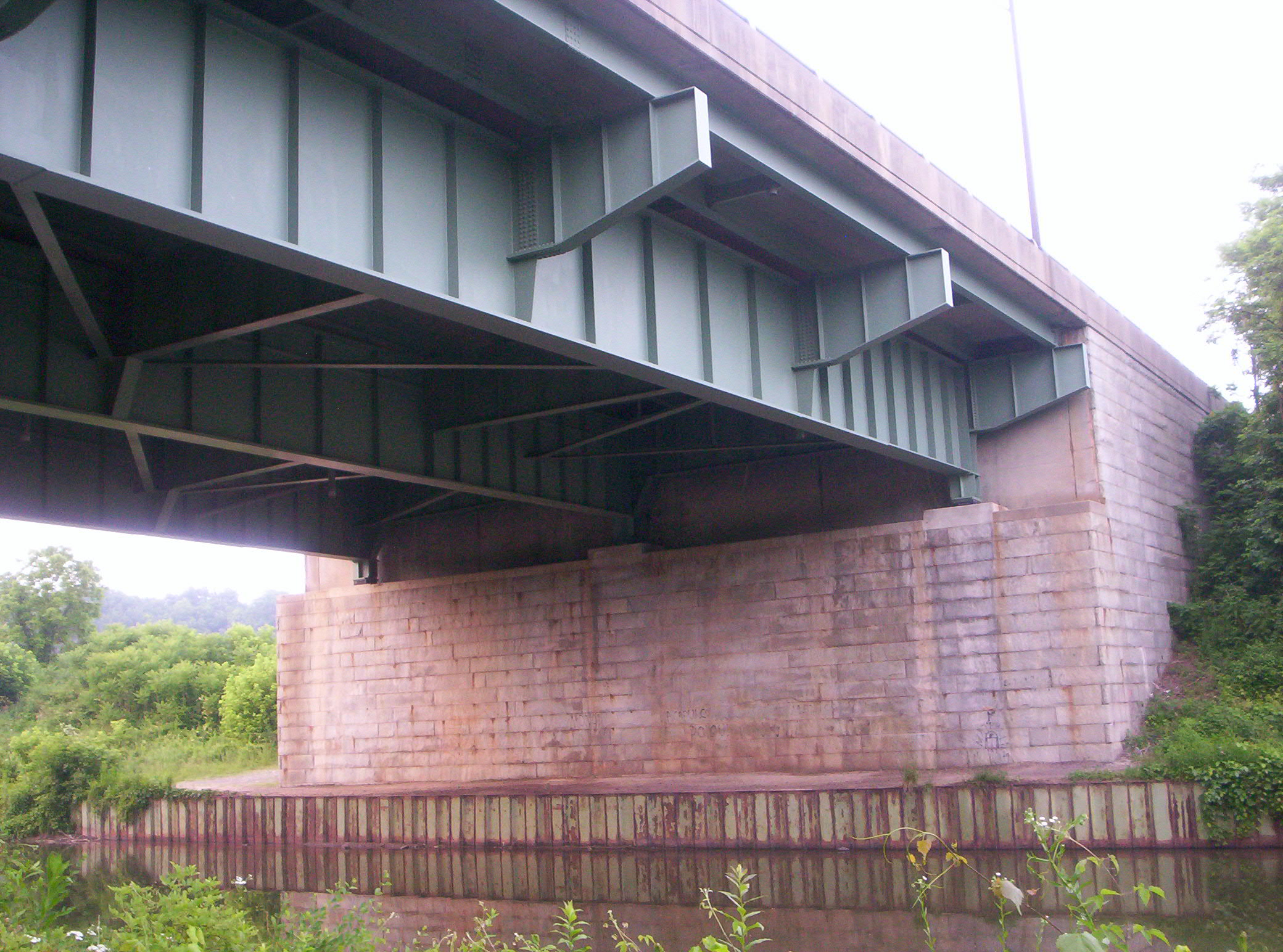
The underside of the bridge, seen above the Delaware and Raritan Canal

The New Hope–Lambertville Toll Bridge has a total length of 1,682 feet (513 m) and contains ten spans. It is constructed with steel girders and a reinforced concrete deck. The bridge's piers are stone faced. The toll gate is located on the Pennsylvania approach. While the DRJTBC states that it has a total of 8 toll lanes, that number has shrunk to 4 toll lanes since the bridge was refurbished in 2003. This refurbishment replaced the old toll plaza with a new one, and it eliminated the toll lanes for those crossing into New Jersey.

== Tolls ==
Tolls are collected Southbound (New Jersey to Pennsylvania) at a 4-lane gate on the Pennsylvania side. There is no toll collected Northbound.

As of January 7, 2024, the pay-by-plate toll for automobiles is $3.00; cars with E-ZPass pay $1.50. Toll rates for trucks range from $9 to $35.
