= Stockton Borough School District =

School district in Hunterdon County, New Jersey, US

Coordinates: 40.405079°N 74.975077°W

- 19 South Main Street; Stockton, New Jersey

District information
- Grades: K-6
- Established: 1832
- Closed: 2018
- Superintendent: Suzanne Ivans
- Business administrator: Gary Johnston
- Schools: 1

Students and staff
- Enrollment: 43 (as of 2011–12)
- Faculty: 4.8 FTEs
- Student–teacher ratio: 8.96:1

Other information
- District Factor Group: FG
Ind.	Per pupil	District spending	Rank (*)	K-6 average	%± vs. average
1A	Total Spending	$17,703	30	$18,891	−6.3%
1	Budgetary Cost	12,768	13	13,649	−6.5%
2	Classroom Instruction	8,414	21	8,366	0.6%
6	Support Services	1,184	2	2,161	−45.2%
8	Administrative Cost	1,829	42	1,467	24.7%
10	Operations & Maintenance	1,342	18	1,552	−13.5%
16	Median Teacher Salary	30,751	1	57,437
Data from NJDoE 2014 Taxpayers' Guide to Education Spending. *Of K-6 districts with any number of students. Lowest spending=1; Highest=59

The Stockton Borough School District was a community public school district that served students in pre-Kindergarten through sixth grade from Stockton, in Hunterdon County, in the U.S. state of New Jersey. As of the 2014–15 school year, the school is part of the South Hunterdon Regional School District, which also serves students from Lambertville and West Amwell Township.

The school's student body of 43 made it the smallest operating school district in the State of New Jersey. Established in 1872, the district operated the oldest three-room schoolhouse in the state still in use, the District No. 98 Schoolhouse.

In a special election held in September 2013, voters from Lambertville, Stockton and West Amwell Township passed referendums to dissolve (and recreate) the South Hunterdon Regional School District and to combine the three existing K-6 school districts from each municipality (Lambertville City School District, Stockton Borough School District and West Amwell Township School District), with majorities in each community passing both ballot items. A single combined regional district would be created, serving students in pre-Kindergarten through twelfth grade, in which property taxes would be levied under a formula in which 57% is based on property values and 43% on the number of students. The executive county superintendent will appoint an interim board of education for the new regional district, which will be responsible for implementing the merger.

As of the 2011–12 school year, the district's one school had an enrollment of 43 students and 4.8 classroom teachers (on an FTE basis), for a student–teacher ratio of 8.96:1.

The district was classified by the New Jersey Department of Education as being in District Factor Group "FG", the fourth-highest of eight groupings. District Factor Groups organize districts statewide to allow comparison by common socioeconomic characteristics of the local districts. From lowest socioeconomic status to highest, the categories are A, B, CD, DE, FG, GH, I and J.

Public school students in seventh through twelfth grades attended the South Hunterdon Regional High School in Lambertville, part of the South Hunterdon Regional High School District, which also serves students from Lambertville and West Amwell Township attend South Hunterdon Regional High School.

== School ==
The Stockton Borough School had an enrollment of 43 students as of the 2011–12 school year. The Stockton School, founded in 1832, closed its doors after the 2017–2018 school year and its students were consolidated among the South Hunterdon Regional School District's two other elementary schools, Lambertville Public School and West Amwell School.

== Administration ==
Core members of the district's administration are:

- Suzanne Ivans, chief school administrator
- Kris Nenna, board secretary
- Gary Johnston, business administrator
