= Lambertville High School =

High school in New Jersey, U.S. (1854–1960)

Coordinates: 40.3680°N 74.9406°W

Lambertville High School, built in 1854 in Lambertville, New Jersey, US, was the former school of the Lambertville school district. A fire destroyed much of the school in 1926, but it was remodeled and rebuilt in 1927 and used until June 1960. It sat (as some from the town have stated) like a museum from then on, on top of the hill overlooking Lambertville and the Delaware River.

The school was closed after the 1960 class graduated as it was too small and outdated for the growing area. Multiple small-town high schools were closed in the 1950s and 1960s across New Jersey, as the state consolidated school districts and replaced obsolete schools like Lambertville High with modern, suburban facilities that could serve larger regional areas. South Hunterdon Regional High School was scheduled to replace Lambertville High and to open for classes in September 1959, but construction was unexpectedly delayed, and so the switchover did not take place until September 1960, with Lambertville High continuing to serve local students during that year.

The old "school on the hill" was then used as a place to sell electronics for a number of years; it eventually sat empty and abandoned, though structurally intact, until vandals set a fire in 1992 which destroyed most of the building's interior and essentially gutted most of the structure, including the roof.

The school was demolished in fall 2012.
