= South Hunterdon Regional School District =

School district in Hunterdon County, New Jersey, US

Address
- 301 Mt. Airy-Harbourton Road Lambertville, Hunterdon County, New Jersey, 08530; United States
- Coordinates: 40.38868°N 74.891029°W

District information
- Grades: Pre-K to 12
- Superintendent: Anthony Suozzo
- Business administrator: J. Andrew Harris
- Schools: 3

Students and staff
- Enrollment: 827 (as of 2022–23)
- Faculty: 108.1 FTEs
- Student–teacher ratio: 7.7:1

Other information
- District Factor Group: FG
- Website: www.shrsd.org
| Ind. | Per pupil | District spending | Rank (*) | K-12 average | %± vs. average |
|---|---|---|---|---|---|
Data from NJDoE 2014 Taxpayers' Guide to Education Spending. *Of K-12 districts with students. Lowest spending=1; Highest=

South Hunterdon Regional School District is a regional public school district serving students in pre-kindergarten though twelfth grades from three communities in southern Hunterdon County, in the U.S. state of New Jersey. The district was established for the 2014–15 school year by consolidating the K-6 districts for Lambertville, Stockton and West Amwell Township together with South Hunterdon Regional High School to create a K-12 district.

As of the 2022–23 school year, the district, comprised of three schools, had an enrollment of 827 students and 108.1 classroom teachers (on an FTE basis), for a student–teacher ratio of 7.7:1.

== History ==
In a special election held in September 2013, voters from Lambertville, Stockton and West Amwell Township passed referendums to dissolve the South Hunterdon Regional High School District and to combine the three existing school districts from each municipality (Lambertville City School District, Stockton Borough School District and West Amwell Township School District), with majorities in each community passing both ballot items. A single combined regional district was created, serving students in PreK-12, with property taxes levied under a formula in which 57% is based on property values and 43% on the number of students. The executive county superintendent appointed an interim board of education for the new regional district, which was responsible for implementing the merger.

A study commissioned by the district prepared by McKissick Associates looked at options for using, modifying and expanding school facilities in the district, in light of long-term trends indicating a decline in the number of school-aged children in the three municipalities. In a February 2016, a presentation prepared for the board of education outlined various scenarios, which could involve options ranging from retaining all existing facilities to consolidating all schools at a single site. After reviewing a matrix of all 10 options and weighing each on several factors identified as relevant, committee members ranked the choices; based on committee votes, the three preferred choices were (1) to keep K-5 students in Lambertville and West Amwell, while moving 6th grade to the high school complex, (2) keeping all facilities at their present locations with equity additions as needed and (3) a consolidated K-12 at a single site.

Stockton Borough Elementary School, which had seen a dramatic decline in enrollment, was closed at the end of the 2017–18 school year.

A November 2021 referendum allocating $33 million for construction projects passed by a two-vote margin. Voters in Lambertville and Stockton voted strongly in favor of the project, overcoming strong opposition from West Amwell Township voters. Renovations and expansion to Lambertville Public School were estimated at $12.7 million and a new middle school for grades 5-8 on the high school campus would cost $20.7 million.

== Schools ==
Schools in the district (with 2022–23 enrollment data from the National Center for Education Statistics) are:

=== Elementary school ===
- South Hunterdon Regional Elementary School for grades PreK–4 (was Lambertville Public School, which had 221 students in grades PreK–6)
  - Wanda Quiñones, principal

=== Middle school ===
- South Hunterdon Regional Middle School for grades 5–8
  - David Miller, principal

=== High school ===
- South Hunterdon Regional High School for grades 9–12 (which had 417 students in grades 7–12)
  - Adam Wright, principal

== Administration ==
Core members of the district's administration are:

- Anthony Suozzo, superintendent
- J. Andrew Harris, business administrator and board secretary

== Board of education ==
The district's board of education, comprised of nine members, sets policy and oversees the fiscal and educational operation of the district through its administration. Of the nine seats, five are allocated to Lambertville, three to West Amwell Township and one to Stockton. As a Type II school district, the board's trustees are elected directly by voters to serve three-year terms of office on a staggered basis, with three seats up for election each year held (since 2014) as part of the November general election. The board appoints a superintendent to oversee the district's day-to-day operations and a business administrator to supervise the business functions of the district.
