= Bowne, New Jersey =

Populated place in Hunterdon County, New Jersey, US

- Unincorporated community
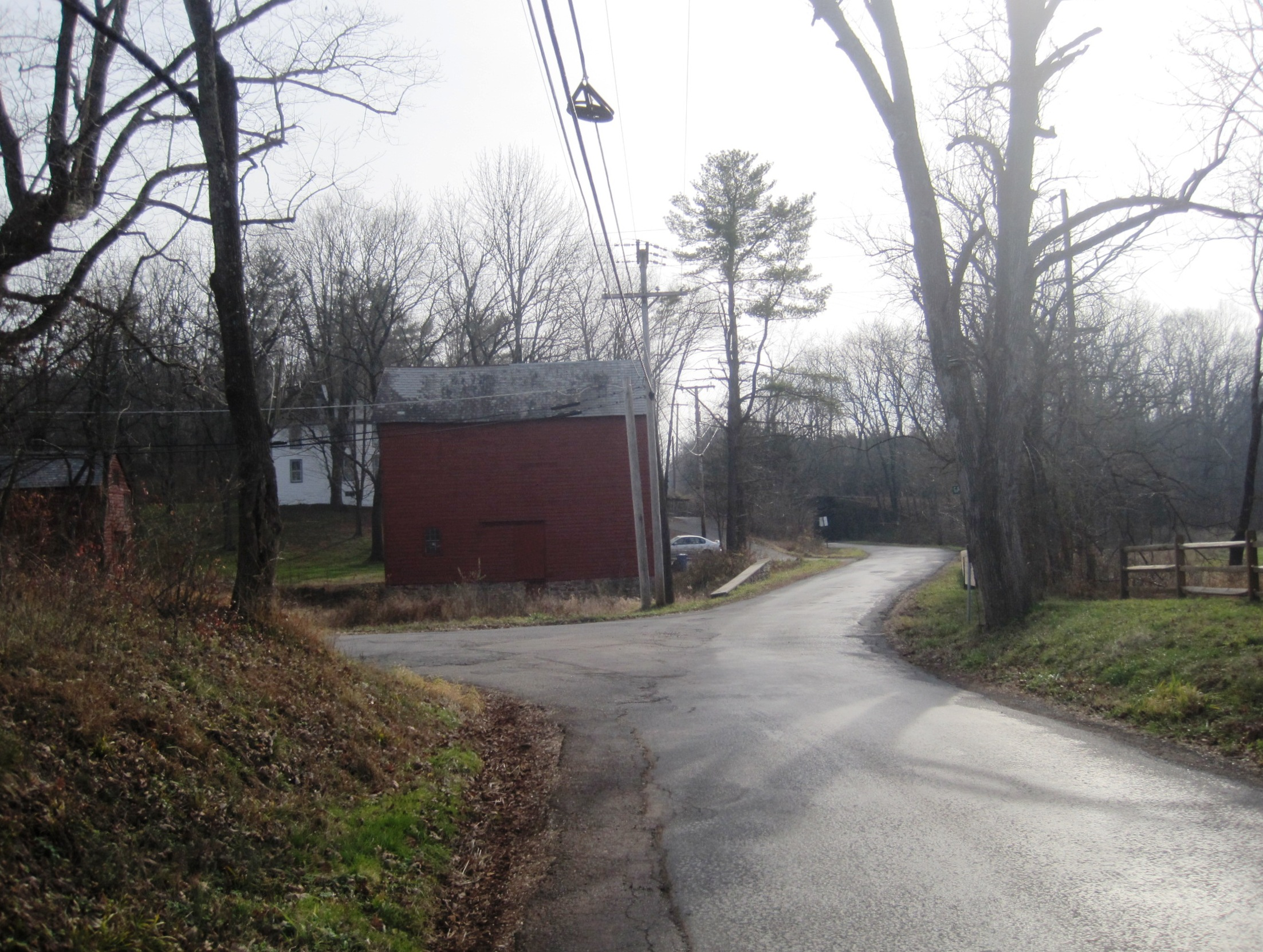
- At the intersection of Bowne Station Road and Garboski Road

- Location of Bowne in Hunterdon County Inset: Location of county within the state of New Jersey Bowne (New Jersey) Bowne (the United States)
- Coordinates: 40°25′11″N 74°54′46″W
- Country: United States
- State: New Jersey
- County: Hunterdon
- Township: Delaware, East Amwell and West Amwell
- Elevation: 167 ft (51 m)
- GNIS feature ID: 874875

Bowne is an unincorporated community located at the intersection of the boundaries of Delaware, East Amwell and West Amwell townships in Hunterdon County, in the U.S. state of New Jersey.

The area is named for Dr. John Bowne, a physician who owned a nearby farm. In the 1870s, the Flemington Railroad & Transportation Company constructed a railroad through the area connecting Lambertville and Flemington with a station (originally named Barber Station, renamed to Bowne Station) at the settlement. This railroad became part of the Belvidere Delaware Railroad and the Pennsylvania Railroad in later years. The railroad's current owner, Black River and Western Railroad, started running passenger trains down to Woodsedge Farm in May 2017. Similar in character to the townships in which the settlement is located, Bowne is surrounded by a mix of farmland, forest, and some single family houses along the main roads through the area, Bowne Station Road and Garboski Road. The Bowne Station Road stone arch bridge over tributary of the Alexauken Creek was added to the National Register of Historic Places in 2024.

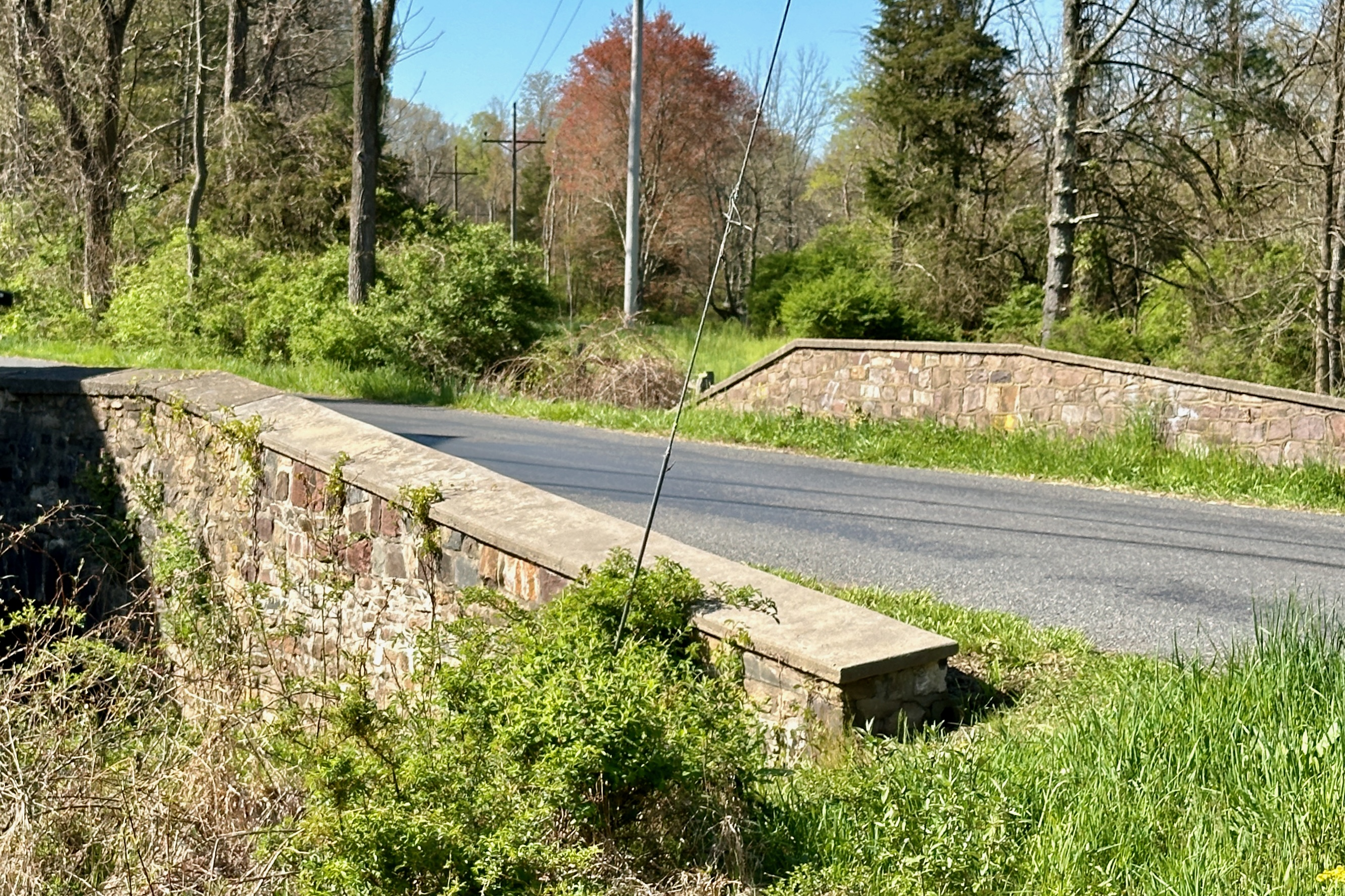
Stone arch bridge listed on the NRHP
