= South Hunterdon Regional High School =

High school in Hunterdon County, New Jersey, US

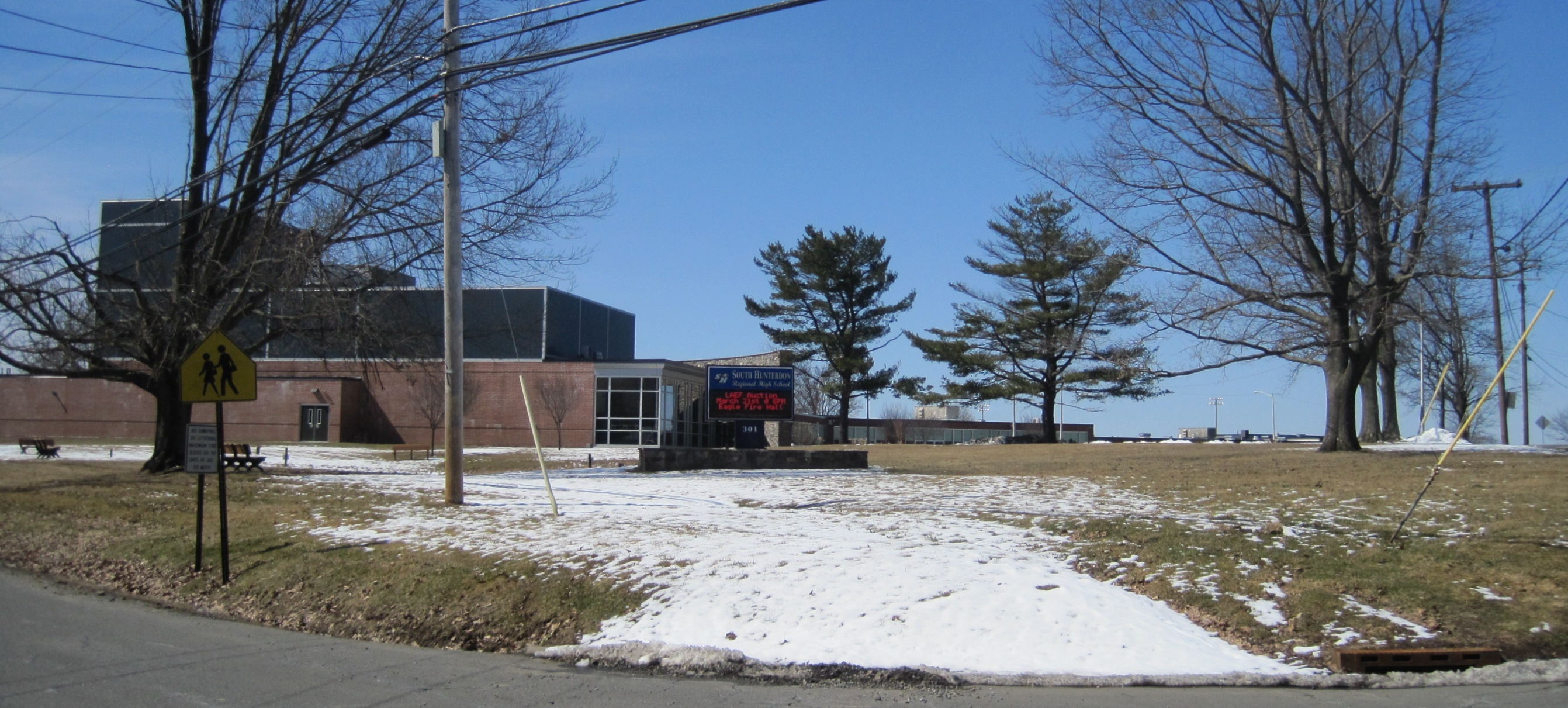

Location
- 301 Mount Airy-Harbourton Road; Lambertville, New Jersey, Hunterdon County, New Jersey, New Jersey 08530; United States
- 40.38868°N 74.891029°W

Information
- Type: Public high school
- Established: 1960
- School district: South Hunterdon Regional School District
- NCES School ID: 340076903036
- Principal: Adam M. Wright
- Faculty: 49.3 FTEs
- Grades: 9-12
- Enrollment: 392 (as of 2023–24, 7-12th grade)
- Student to teacher ratio: 8.0:1
- Colors: Blue and Steel
- Athletics conference: Skyland Conference (general); Big Central Football Conference (football)
- Team name: Eagles
- Accreditation: Middle States Association of Colleges and Schools
- Website: hs.shrsd.org

South Hunterdon Regional High School is a regional public high school serving students in ninth though twelfth grades (formerly seventh through twelfth grade prior to the construction of a new middle school) from three communities in southern Hunterdon County, in the U.S. state of New Jersey, as part of the South Hunterdon Regional School District. It has been the smallest public high school in the state. Students attend the school from Lambertville, Stockton and West Amwell Township. The school has been accredited by the Middle States Association of Colleges and Schools Commission on Elementary and Secondary Schools since 1977.

As of the 2023–24 school year, the school had an enrollment of 392 students and 49.3 classroom teachers (on an FTE basis), for a student–teacher ratio of 8.0:1. There were 83 students (21.2% of enrollment) eligible for free lunch and 33 (8.4% of students) eligible for reduced-cost lunch.

South Hunterdon Regional High School's small size and broad extracurricular offerings provides the opportunity for students from outside the district to attend by paying tuition, as some consider the small class sizes and environment to be similar to that of a private school.

== History ==
Constructed at a cost of $1.25 million (equivalent to $13.6 million in 2025), the school opened in September 1960 with an enrollment of 500 students. Prior to the opening of the regional facility, students had attended Lambertville High School, which was then closed down.

In a special election held in September 2013, voters from Lambertville, Stockton and West Amwell Township passed referendums to dissolve the South Hunterdon Regional School District and to combine the three existing school districts from each municipality (Lambertville City School District, Stockton Borough School District and West Amwell Township School District), with majorities in each community passing both ballot items. A single combined regional district was created, serving students in pre-kindergarten through twelfth grade, in which property taxes are levied under a formula in which 57% is based on property values and 43% on the number of students. The executive county superintendent appointed an interim board of education for the new regional district, which was responsible for implementing the merger.

== Awards, recognition and rankings ==
The school was the 100th-ranked public high school in New Jersey out of 339 schools statewide in New Jersey Monthly magazine's September 2014 cover story on the state's "Top Public High Schools", using a new ranking methodology. The school had been ranked 21st in the state of 328 schools in 2012, after being ranked 74th in 2010 out of 322 schools listed. The magazine ranked the school 58th in 2008 out of 316 schools. The school was ranked 120th in the magazine's September 2006 issue, which included 316 schools across the state. Schooldigger.com ranked the school as tied for 180th out of 376 public high schools statewide in its 2010 rankings (an increase of 47 positions from the 2009 rank) which were based on the combined percentage of students classified as proficient or above proficient on the language arts literacy and mathematics components of the High School Proficiency Assessment (HSPA).

== Athletics ==
The South Hunterdon High School Eagles compete in the Skyland Conference, which is comprised of public and private high schools covering Hunterdon, Somerset and Warren counties in west Central Jersey, and was established following a reorganization of sports leagues in Northern New Jersey by the New Jersey State Interscholastic Athletic Association (NJSIAA). With 239 students in grades 10–12, the school was classified by the NJSIAA for the 2019–20 school year as Group I for most athletic competition purposes, which included schools with an enrollment of 75 to 476 students in that grade range. The football team competes in Division 1B of the Big Central Football Conference, which includes 60 public and private high schools in Hunterdon, Middlesex, Somerset, Union and Warren counties, which are broken down into 10 divisions by size and location. The school was classified by the NJSIAA as Group I South for football for 2024–2026, which included schools with 185 to 482 students.

The South Hunterdon football team won the NJSIAA Central Jersey Group I state sectional title in both 1975 and 1979. The team defeated Keyport High School by a score of 28–0 in the 1975 Central Jersey Group I championship game to win their first title. The 1979 team finished the season with a 9–2 record after winning the Central Jersey Group I state sectional title with a 28–8 win against Dunellen High School in the final game of the tournament.

The field hockey team won the Central Jersey sectional championship in 1974, and won the Central Jersey Group I title in 1975, 1976, 1980-1982 and 1984–1991, and won the combined North I and II Group I title in 2002; the team was Group I champion in 1976 (as co-champion with Chatham Township High School), 1984 (vs. Chatham Borough High School) and 1988 (vs. Belvidere High School). The 1976 team was declared as the Group I co-champion following a scoreless tie after two overtime periods in the title game against Chatham Township; after flipping a coin, South Hunterdon obtained custody of the trophy for half the year while the trophy would be displayed at Chatham Township for the second half.

The boys' basketball team finished the 2010 season with a record of 18–8, won the program's first divisional title and made it to the finals of the Central Jersey Group I tournament, but fell short to Asbury Park High School by a score of 73–57.

The girls' basketball team won the Group I state championship in 1992, defeating Whippany Park High School in the tournament final. The team made it to the finals of the 2006 Central Jersey Group I tournament, defeating Bordentown Regional High School by a score of 55–45.

== Administration ==
The school's principal is Adam Wright.

== Notable alumni ==
- Kyle Tress (born 1981), Olympic athlete in the sport of skeleton.
