= Bowne Station Road stone arch bridge over tributary of the Alexauken Creek =

- U.S. National Register of Historic Places
- New Jersey Register of Historic Places
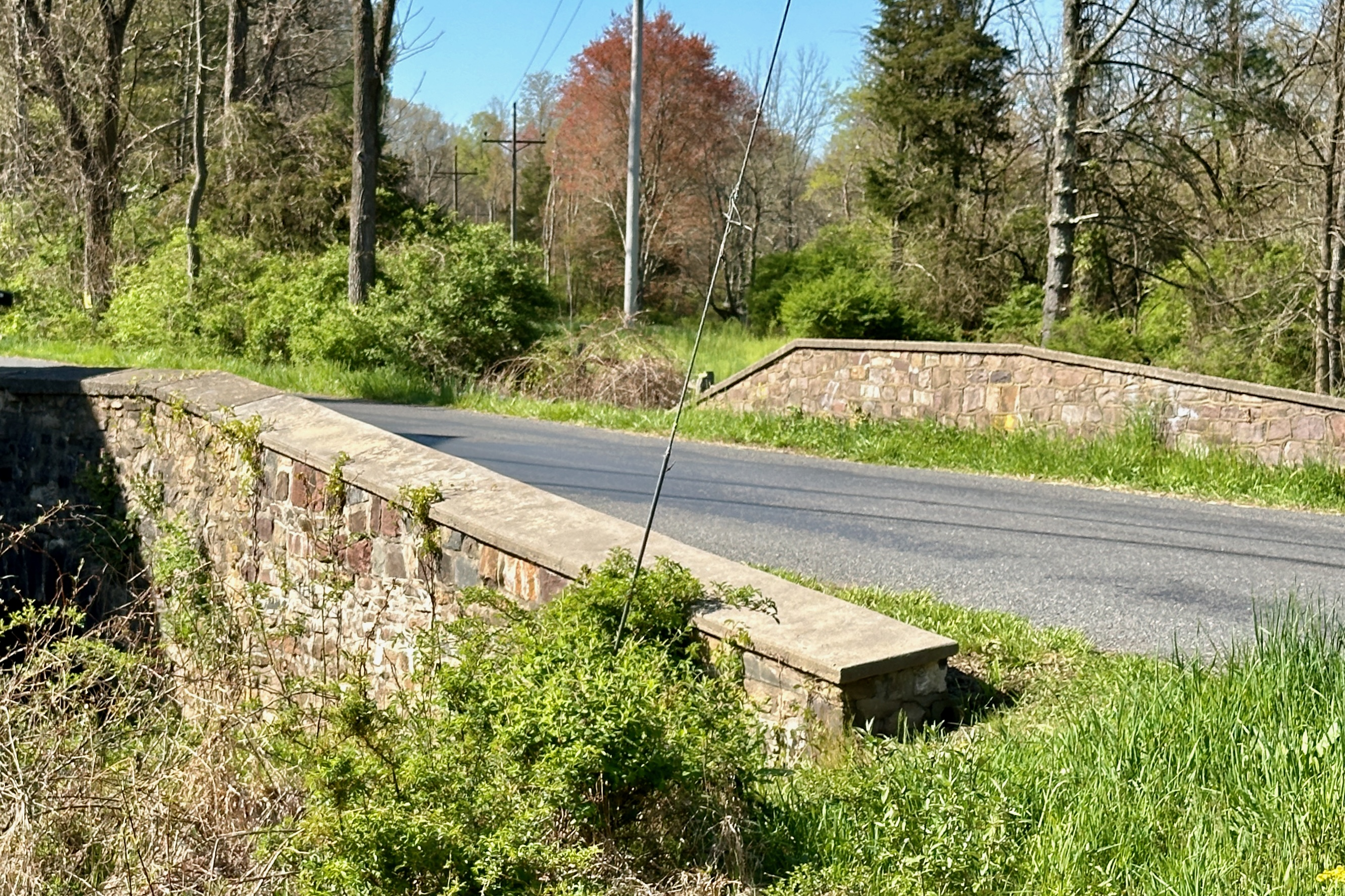

- Location within Hunterdon County, New Jersey Location within New Jersey Location within the United States
- Location: Bowne Station Road over tributary of the Alexauken Creek, Bowne, New Jersey
- Coordinates: 40°25′11.2″N 74°54′47.9″W
- Built: 1837
- MPS: Historic Bridges of Delaware Township, Hunterdon County, New Jersey MPDF
- NRHP reference No.: 100010172
- NJRHP No.: 5875

Significant dates
- Added to NRHP: April 11, 2024
- Designated NJRHP: February 22, 2024

The Bowne Station Road stone arch bridge over tributary of the Alexauken Creek is located in the Bowne section of Hunterdon County, New Jersey, United States. It is on the boundary between Delaware Township and East Amwell Township. Built in 1837, the stone arch bridge was added to the National Register of Historic Places on April 11, 2024, for its significance in engineering and transportation. It was listed as part of the Historic Bridges of Delaware Township, Hunterdon County, New Jersey Multiple Property Submission (MPS).

The bridge was originally built in 1837, as noted by the datestone in the east parapet wall. Sandstone from the underlying Stockton Formation was used in its construction. It was widened in 1938, with a new west parapet wall and barrel vault. The area is named after Dr. John Bowne (1767–1857) who lived nearby. In 1854, the Flemington Railroad and Transportation Company built a railroad between Flemington and Lambertville, with a station located here, known as Bowne Station.

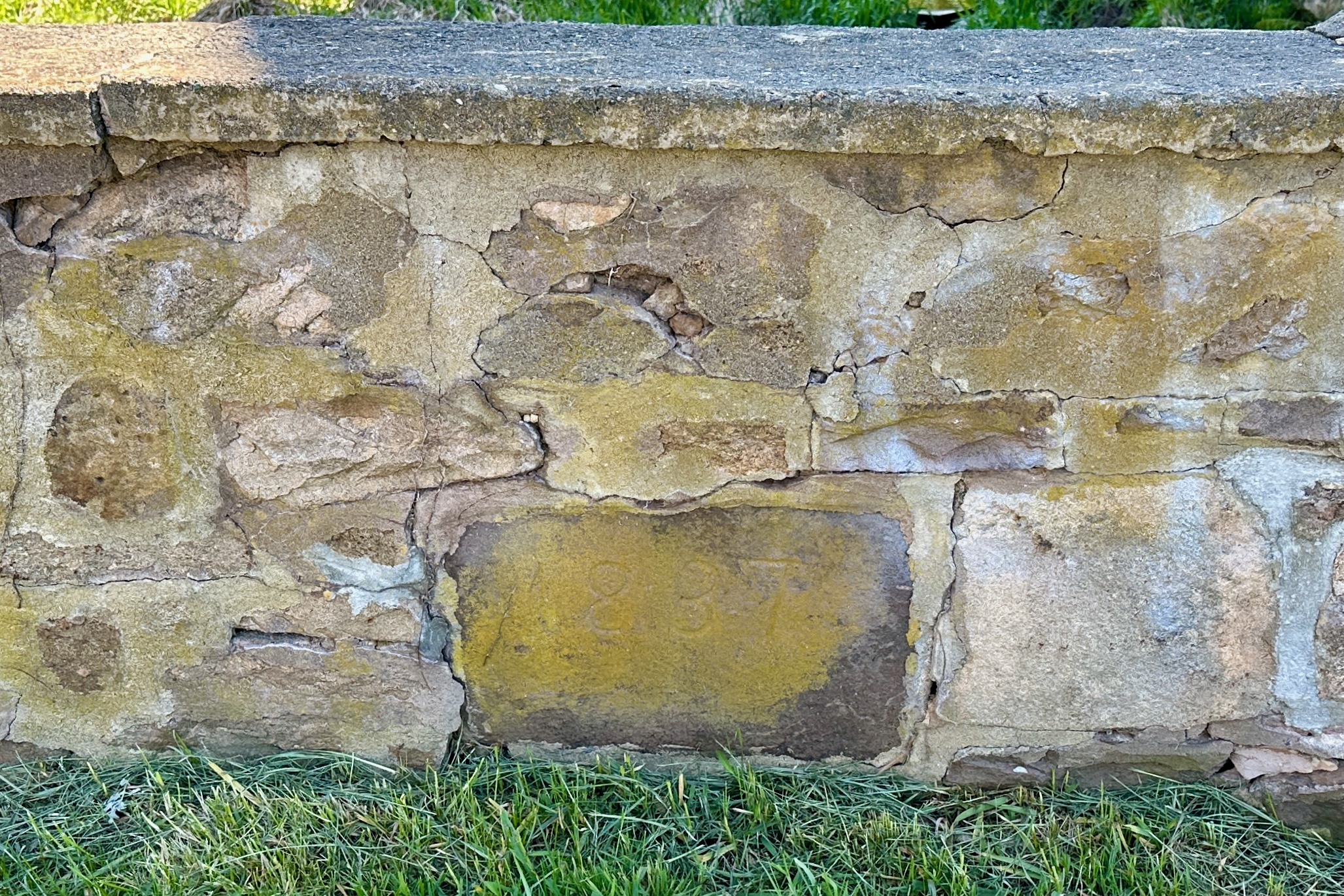
1837 datestone in east parapet wall

== See also ==
- National Register of Historic Places listings in Hunterdon County, New Jersey
- List of bridges on the National Register of Historic Places in New Jersey
