= West Amwell Township, New Jersey =

Township in Hunterdon County, New Jersey, US

- Township
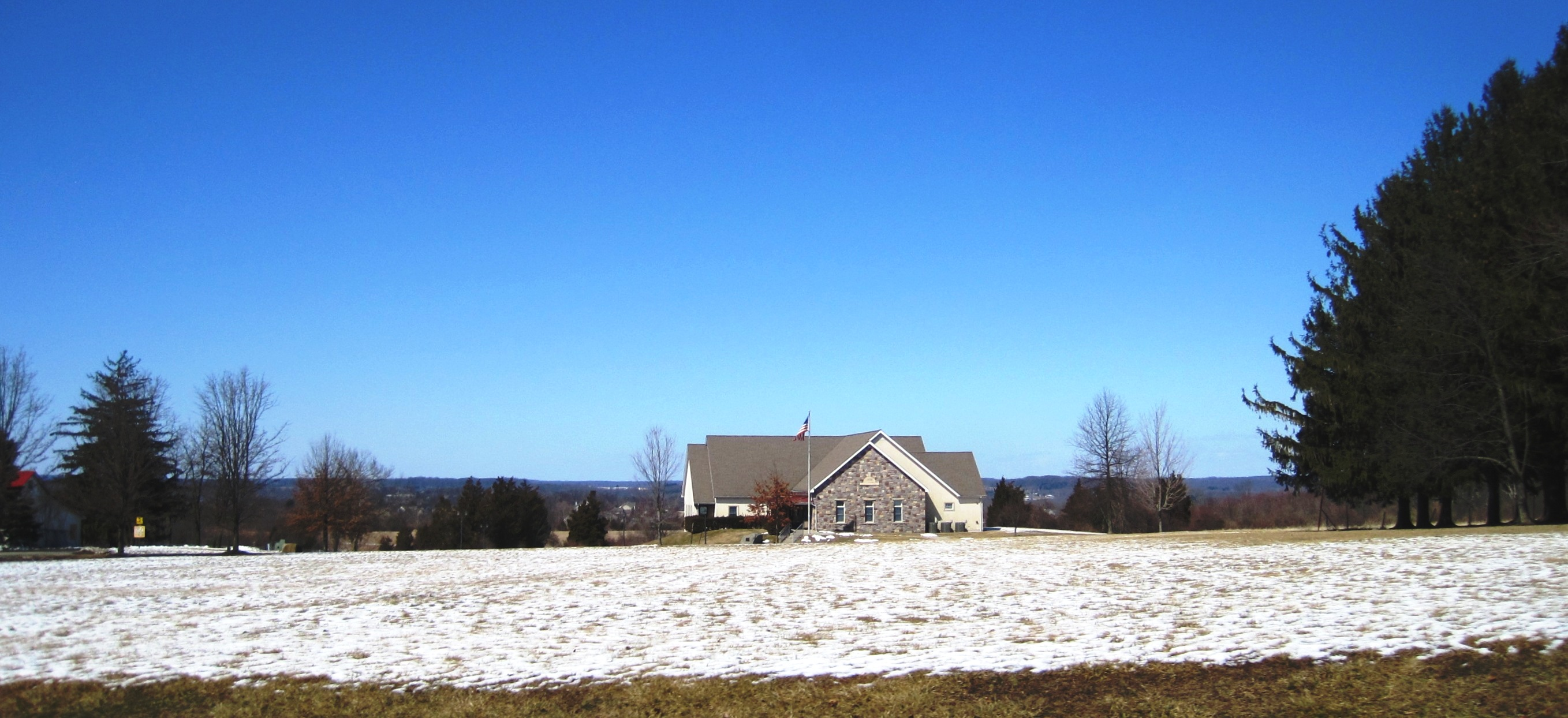
- West Amwell Township Municipal Building

- Seal

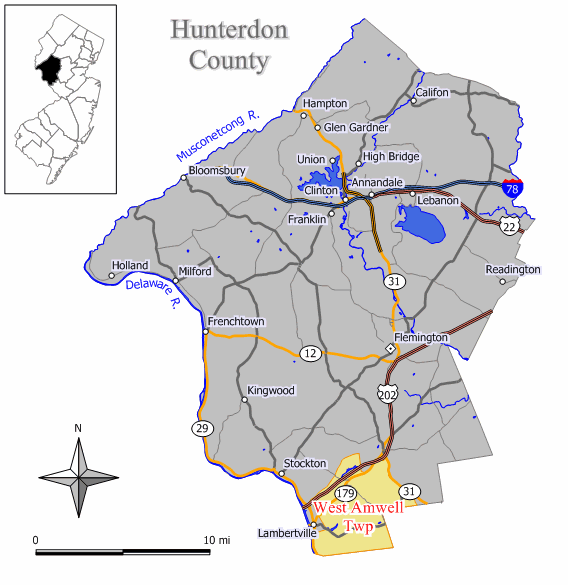
- Location of West Amwell Township in Hunterdon County highlighted in yellow (right). Inset map: Location of Hunterdon County in New Jersey highlighted in black (left).

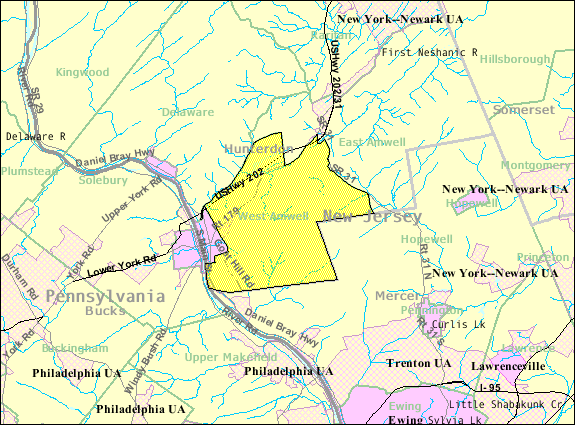
- Census Bureau map of West Amwell Township, New Jersey

- Location in Hunterdon County Location in New Jersey Location in the United States
- Coordinates: 40.379051°N 74.887735°W
- Country: United States
- State: New Jersey
- County: Hunterdon
- Incorporated: April 6, 1846
- Named for: Amwell Township / Great and Little Amwell, Hertfordshire

Government
  - Type: Township
  - Body: Township Committee
  - Mayor: Gary Hoyer (R, term ends December 31, 2023)
  - Municipal clerk: Maria Andrews

Area
  - Total: 21.85 sq mi (56.58 km^{2})
  - Land: 21.65 sq mi (56.07 km^{2})
  - Water: 0.20 sq mi (0.51 km^{2}) 0.90%
  - Rank: 129th of 565 in state 12th of 26 in county
- Elevation: 315 ft (96 m)

Population (2020)
  - Total: 3,005
  - Estimate (2023): 3,020
  - Rank: 449th of 565 in state 17th of 26 in county
  - Density: 138.8/sq mi (53.6/km^{2})
  - Rank: 525th of 565 in state 23rd of 26 in county
- Time zone: UTC−05:00 (Eastern (EST))
  - Summer (DST): UTC−04:00 (Eastern (EDT))
- ZIP Code: 08530 – Lambertville
- Area code: 609
- FIPS code: 3401978230
- GNIS feature ID: 0882181
- Website: www.westamwelltwp.org

West Amwell Township is a township in Hunterdon County, in the U.S. state of New Jersey. As of the 2020 United States census, the township's population was 3,005, a decrease of 835 (−21.7%) from the 2010 census count of 3,840, which in turn reflected an increase of 1,457 (+61.1%) from the 2,383 counted in the 2000 census.

West Amwell was incorporated as a township by an act of the New Jersey Legislature on April 6, 1846, when Amwell Township was split, also creating East Amwell Township at the same time. Portions of the township were taken to form Lambertville town on March 1, 1849. In 1896, the township annexed portions of Delaware Township, East Amwell Township and Raritan Township. The township was named for Amwell Township, which in turn was named for Great Amwell/Little Amwell, Hertfordshire in England.

== History ==
The earliest settlers of the area were the Delaware Native Americans, who had a path through the woods from Lambertville through Mount Airy, Ringoes and Reaville to Newark which would later become the route followed by the Old York Road.

In 1935, local farmers signed a declaration against the Potato Control Law, which established federal controls on the growth of the crop, stating "[t]hat we protest against and declare that we will not be bound by the 'Potato Control Law,' an unconstitutional measure recently enacted by the United States Congress. We shall produce on our own land such potatoes as we may wish to produce and will dispose of them in such manner as we may deem proper."

== Geography ==
The northern areas of West Amwell are in Amwell Valley, while the southern sections are in The Sourlands region. The Delaware River separates West Amwell from the Commonwealth of Pennsylvania.

According to the United States Census Bureau, the township had a total area of 21.84 square miles (56.58 km^{2}), including 21.65 square miles (56.07 km^{2}) of land and 0.20 square miles (0.51 km^{2}) of water (0.90%).

Unincorporated communities, localities and place names located partially or completely within the township include Alexauken, Bowlryville, Bowne, Linvale (historically known as New Market), Mount Airy, Oakdale and Rocktown.

The township borders Delaware Township, East Amwell Township and Lambertville in Hunterdon County; Hopewell Township, in Mercer County; along with New Hope and Solebury Township across the Delaware River in Bucks County in Pennsylvania.

== Demographics ==
Historical population
Census	Pop.	Note	%±
1850	1,175	*	—
1860	1,089		−7.3%
1870	1,030		−5.4%
1880	1,039		0.9%
1890	866		−16.7%
1900	839		−3.1%
1910	866		3.2%
1920	735		−15.1%
1930	788		7.2%
1940	975		23.7%
1950	1,213		24.4%
1960	1,683		38.7%
1970	2,142		27.3%
1980	2,299		7.3%
1990	2,251		−2.1%
2000	2,383		5.9%
2010	3,840		61.1%
2020	3,005		−21.7%
2023 (est.)	3,020		0.5%
Population sources: 1850–1920 1850–1870; 1850 1870 1880–1890; 1890–1910 1910–1930 1940–2000; 2000 2010 2020 * = Lost territory in previous decade.

=== 2010 census ===
The 2010 United States census counted 3,840 people, 1,102 households, and 839 families in the township. The population density was 177.9 inhabitants per square mile (68.7/km^{2}). There were 1,157 housing units at an average density of 53.6 per square mile (20.7/km^{2}). The racial makeup was 82.58% (3,171) White, 13.39% (514) Black or African American, 0.05% (2) Native American, 1.46% (56) Asian, 0.05% (2) Pacific Islander, 1.12% (43) from other races, and 1.35% (52) from two or more races. Hispanic or Latino of any race were 4.84% (186) of the population.

Of the 1,102 households, 30.9% had children under the age of 18; 66.9% were married couples living together; 5.2% had a female householder with no husband present and 23.9% were non-families. Of all households, 19.5% were made up of individuals and 9.2% had someone living alone who was 65 years of age or older. The average household size was 2.58 and the average family size was 2.95.

16.5% of the population were under the age of 18, 11.8% from 18 to 24, 30.1% from 25 to 44, 30.2% from 45 to 64, and 11.4% who were 65 years of age or older. The median age was 40.8 years. For every 100 females, the population had 155.1 males. For every 100 females ages 18 and older there were 165.5 males.

The Census Bureau's 2006–2010 American Community Survey showed that (in 2010 inflation-adjusted dollars) median household income was $101,094 (with a margin of error of +/− $16,403) and the median family income was $115,595 (+/− $19,328). Males had a median income of $86,875 (+/− $26,080) versus $53,438 (+/− $17,350) for females. The per capita income for the borough was $54,485 (+/− $9,741). About 4.2% of families and 4.4% of the population were below the poverty line, including 3.2% of those under age 18 and 4.9% of those age 65 or over.

=== 2000 census ===
As of the 2000 United States census there were 2,383 people, 949 households, and 696 families residing in the township. The population density was 109.7 inhabitants per square mile (42.4/km^{2}). There were 984 housing units at an average density of 45.3 per square mile (17.5/km^{2}). The racial makeup of the township was 98.07% White, 0.63% African American, 0.08% Native American, 0.71% Asian, 0.04% from other races, and 0.46% from two or more races. Hispanic or Latino of any race were 0.71% of the population.

There were 949 households, out of which 29.1% had children under the age of 18 living with them, 65.3% were married couples living together, 5.1% had a female householder with no husband present, and 26.6% were non-families. 21.3% of all households were made up of individuals, and 8.7% had someone living alone who was 65 years of age or older. The average household size was 2.51 and the average family size was 2.93.

In the township, the population was spread out, with 21.1% under the age of 18, 4.5% from 18 to 24, 28.3% from 25 to 44, 32.1% from 45 to 64, and 13.8% who were 65 years of age or older. The median age was 43 years. For every 100 females, there were 100.3 males. For every 100 females age 18 and over, there were 101.2 males.

The median income for a household in the township was $73,380, and the median income for a family was $79,605. Males had a median income of $49,539 versus $33,333 for females. The per capita income for the township was $33,877. About 0.6% of families and 1.6% of the population were below the poverty line, including none of those under age 18 and 1.2% of those age 65 or over.

== Government ==
=== Local government ===
West Amwell Township is governed under the Township form of New Jersey municipal government, one of 141 municipalities (of the 564) statewide that use this form, the second-most commonly used form of government in the state. The governing body is comprised of a three-member Township Committee, whose members are elected directly by the voters at-large in partisan elections to serve three-year terms of office on a staggered basis, with either one seat coming up for election each year as part of the November general election in a three-year cycle. At an annual reorganization meeting, the Township Committee selects one of its members to serve as Mayor and another as Deputy Mayor for terms of one year.

As of 2023, members of the West Amwell Township Committee are Mayor Gary Hoyer (R, term on committee ends December 31, 2024; term as mayor ends 2023), Deputy Mayor Stephen Bergenfeld (R, term on committee ends 2024; term as deputy mayor ends 2023), James Cally (R, 2025), John C. Dale (R, 2023) and Megan Hudson (D, 2025).

After voters passed a non-binding referendum in November 2014 supporting the expansion of the Township Committee from three to five members, the Township Committee addressed the process of following through with the expansion, which would involve gathering petitions of 147 voters after which the committee could approve the expansion or a referendum could be put on the ballot. In February 2016, the Township Committee voted to approve the expansion by ordinance.

=== Federal, state and county representation ===
West Amwell Township is located in the 7th Congressional District and is part of New Jersey's 15th state legislative district.

For the 119th United States Congress, New Jersey's 7th congressional district is represented by Thomas Kean Jr. (R, Westfield). New Jersey is represented in the United States Senate by Democrats Cory Booker (Newark, term ends 2027) and Andy Kim (Moorestown, term ends 2031).

For the 2026–2027 session, the 15th legislative district of the New Jersey Legislature is represented in the State Senate by Shirley Turner (D, Lawrence Township) and in the General Assembly by Verlina Reynolds-Jackson (D, Trenton) and Anthony Verrelli (D, Hopewell Township).

Hunterdon County is governed by a Board of County Commissioners comprised of five members who are elected at-large on a partisan basis to serve three-year terms of office on a staggered basis, with either one or two seats up for election each year as part of the November general election. At an annual reorganization meeting held each January, the commissioners select one member to serve as the board's Director and another to serve as Deputy Director, each for a one-year term. As of 2025, Hunterdon County's Commissioners are Director John E. Lanza (R; Raritan Township, 2025), Deputy Director Shaun C. Van Doren (R; Tewksbury Township, 2026), Jeff Kuhl (R; Raritan Township, 2027), Zachary T. Rich (R; West Amwell Township, 2025) and Susan Soloway (R; Franklin Township, 2027).

Constitutional officers elected on a countywide basis are Clerk Mary H. Melfi (R; Flemington, 2026), Sheriff Fredrick W. Brown (R; Alexandria Township, 2025) and Surrogate Heidi Rohrbach (R; Lebanon Township, 2028).

=== Politics ===
As of March 2011, there were a total of 2,071 registered voters in West Amwell Township, of which 498 (24.0%) were registered as Democrats, 830 (40.1%) were registered as Republicans and 741 (35.8%) were registered as Unaffiliated. There were 2 voters registered as either Libertarians or Greens.

Gubernatorial election results for West Amwell Township
Year	Republican		Democratic		Third party(ies)	
Year	No.	%	No.	%	No.	%
2025	846	51.06%	807	48.70%	4	0.24%
2021	799	56.47%	603	42.61%	13	0.92%
2017	669	55.89%	506	42.27%	22	1.84%
2013	675	70.90%	249	26.16%	28	2.94%
2009	764	57.83%	462	34.97%	95	7.19%
2005	667	54.05%	521	42.22%	46	3.73%

In the 2012 presidential election, Republican Mitt Romney received 52.3% of the vote (827 cast), ahead of Democrat Barack Obama with 46.4% (733 votes), and other candidates with 1.3% (20 votes), among the 1,587 ballots cast by the township's 2,178 registered voters (7 ballots were spoiled), for a turnout of 72.9%. In the 2008 presidential election, Republican John McCain received 50.8% of the vote (878 cast), ahead of Democrat Barack Obama with 47.1% (814 votes) and other candidates with 1.4% (24 votes), among the 1,730 ballots cast by the township's 2,101 registered voters, for a turnout of 82.3%. In the 2004 presidential election, Republican George W. Bush received 55.6% of the vote (899 ballots cast), outpolling Democrat John Kerry with 43.2% (698 votes) and other candidates with 1.1% (22 votes), among the 1,616 ballots cast by the township's 1,940 registered voters, for a turnout percentage of 83.3.

United States presidential election results for West Amwell Township
Year	Republican		Democratic		Third party(ies)	
Year	No.	%	No.	%	No.	%
2024	999	51.07%	930	47.55%	27	1.38%
2020	1,004	49.98%	974	48.48%	31	1.54%
2016	898	52.76%	728	42.77%	76	4.47%
2012	827	52.34%	733	46.39%	20	1.27%
2008	878	51.17%	814	47.44%	24	1.40%
2004	899	55.53%	698	43.11%	22	1.36%

In the 2013 gubernatorial election, Republican Chris Christie received 70.9% of the vote (675 cast), ahead of Democrat Barbara Buono with 26.2% (249 votes), and other candidates with 2.9% (28 votes), among the 979 ballots cast by the township's 2,149 registered voters (27 ballots were spoiled), for a turnout of 45.6%. In the 2009 gubernatorial election, Republican Chris Christie received 56.7% of the vote (764 ballots cast), ahead of Democrat Jon Corzine with 34.3% (462 votes), Independent Chris Daggett with 6.6% (89 votes) and other candidates with 0.4% (6 votes), among the 1,348 ballots cast by the township's 2,074 registered voters, yielding a 65.0% turnout.

United States Senate election results for West Amwell Township1
Year	Republican		Democratic		Third party(ies)	
Year	No.	%	No.	%	No.	%
2024	928	49.10%	931	49.26%	31	1.64%
2018	814	55.68%	606	41.45%	42	2.87%
2012	732	49.63%	675	45.76%	68	4.61%
2006	620	54.20%	490	42.83%	34	2.97%

United States Senate election results for West Amwell Township2
Year	Republican		Democratic		Third party(ies)	
Year	No.	%	No.	%	No.	%
2020	986	50.33%	942	48.09%	31	1.58%
2014	484	55.44%	373	42.73%	16	1.83%
2013	352	56.77%	261	42.10%	7	1.13%
2008	900	55.90%	655	40.68%	55	3.42%

== Education ==
The South Hunterdon Regional School District serves students in pre-kindergarten through twelfth grade from Lambertville, Stockton and West Amwell Township. Each of the three municipalities had their own school through sixth grade, until the Stockton school was closed after the end of the 2017–18 school year; public school students in seventh through twelfth grades attend a shared high school in Lambertville. As of the 2022–23 school year, the district, comprised of three schools, had an enrollment of 827 students and 108.1 classroom teachers (on an FTE basis), for a student–teacher ratio of 7.7:1. Schools in the district (with 2022–23 enrollment data from the National Center for Education Statistics) are South Hunterdon Regional Elementary School for grades PreK–4 (was Lambertville Public School, which had 221 students in grades PreK–6), South Hunterdon Regional Middle School for grades 5–8 (was West Amwell School, with 170 students in grades K–6) and South Hunterdon Regional High School for grades 9–12 (which had 417 students in grades 7–12). The township is assigned three of the nine seats on the regional district's board of education.

In a special election held in September 2013, voters from Lambertville, Stockton and West Amwell Township passed referendums to dissolve the South Hunterdon Regional High School District and to combine the three existing school districts from each municipality (Lambertville City School District, Stockton Borough School District and West Amwell Township School District), with majorities in each community passing both ballot items. A single combined regional Pre-K–12 district was created, with property taxes levied under a formula in which 57% is based on property values and 43% on the number of students. The executive county superintendent appointed an interim board of education for the new regional district, which was responsible for implementing the merger.

Eighth grade students from all of Hunterdon County are eligible to apply to attend the high school programs offered by the Hunterdon County Vocational School District, a county-wide vocational school district that offers career and technical education at its campuses in Raritan Township and at programs sited at local high schools, with no tuition charged to students for attendance.

== Historic district ==
The Pleasant Valley Historic District is a 1,565-acre (633 ha) historic district located along Pleasant Valley Road, Valley Road, Woodens Lane and Hunter Road in the community of Pleasant Valley in Hopewell Township in Mercer County that extends into West Amwell Township. The district was added to the National Register of Historic Places on June 14, 1991, for its significance in agriculture, architecture, and exploration/settlement. It includes 52 contributing buildings, 7 contributing structures, and 22 contributing sites.

Central to the district is the Howell Living History Farm, which is a 130-acre (53 ha) living open-air museum located in the Hopewell Township side of the district, just north of Titusville. The farm was added to the National Register of Historic Places on May 2, 1977, for its significance in agriculture and architecture. The farm was included in the Pleasant Valley Historic District on June 14, 1991. The farm was first created by Joseph Phillips, a blacksmith, who purchased 125 acres (51 ha) from William Bryant in 1732. By 1800, Henry Phillips, Joseph's son, had enlarged the farm by 100 acres (40 ha). The current buildings on the property date to the 19th century, primarily before the American Civil War. The final private owner of the farm was the Howell family, who donated the land to Mercer County in 1974 for use as a museum. The museum shows farm life from the year 1900.

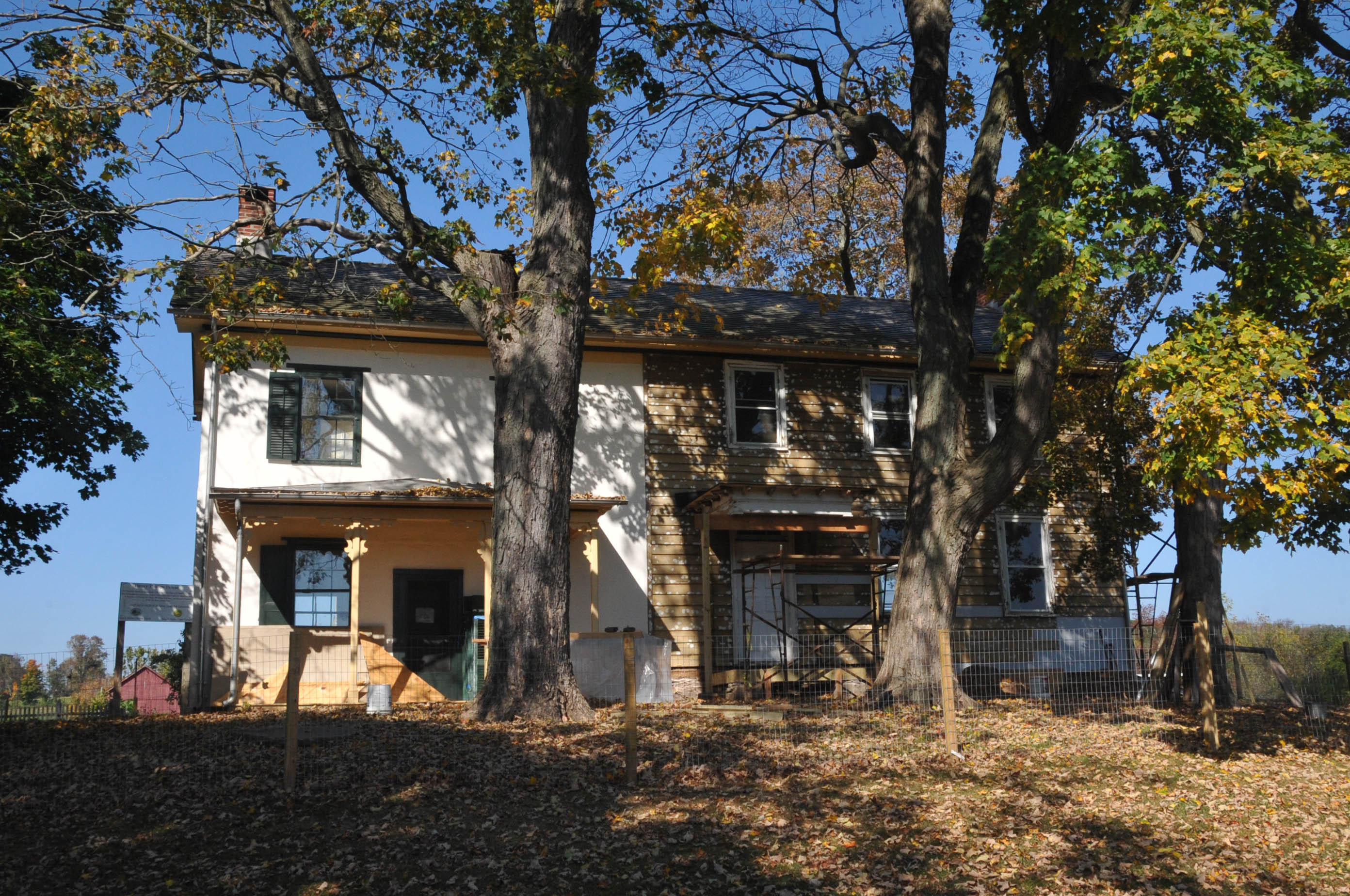
Joseph Phillips Farmhouse

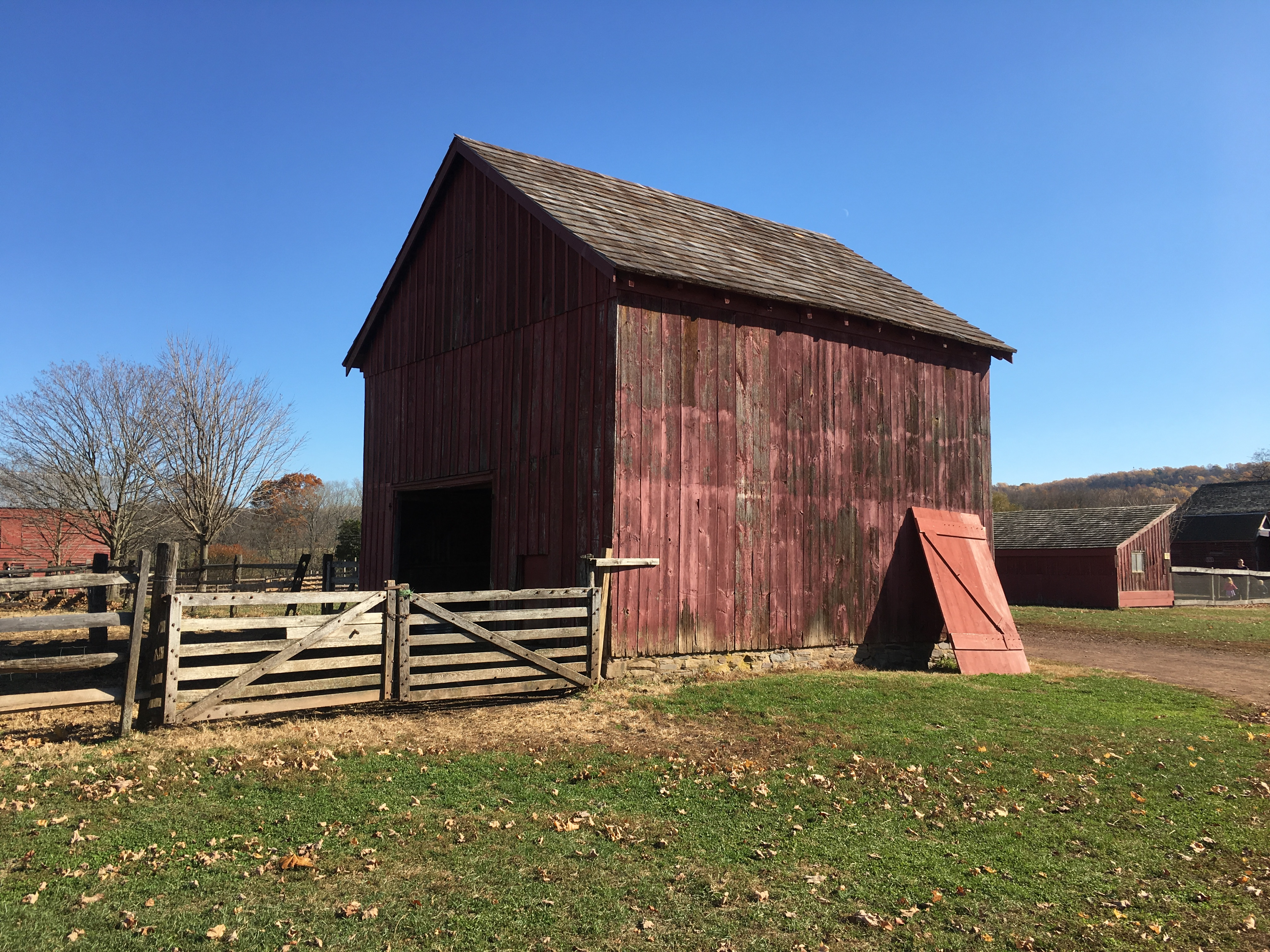
Barn on Joseph Phillips Farm

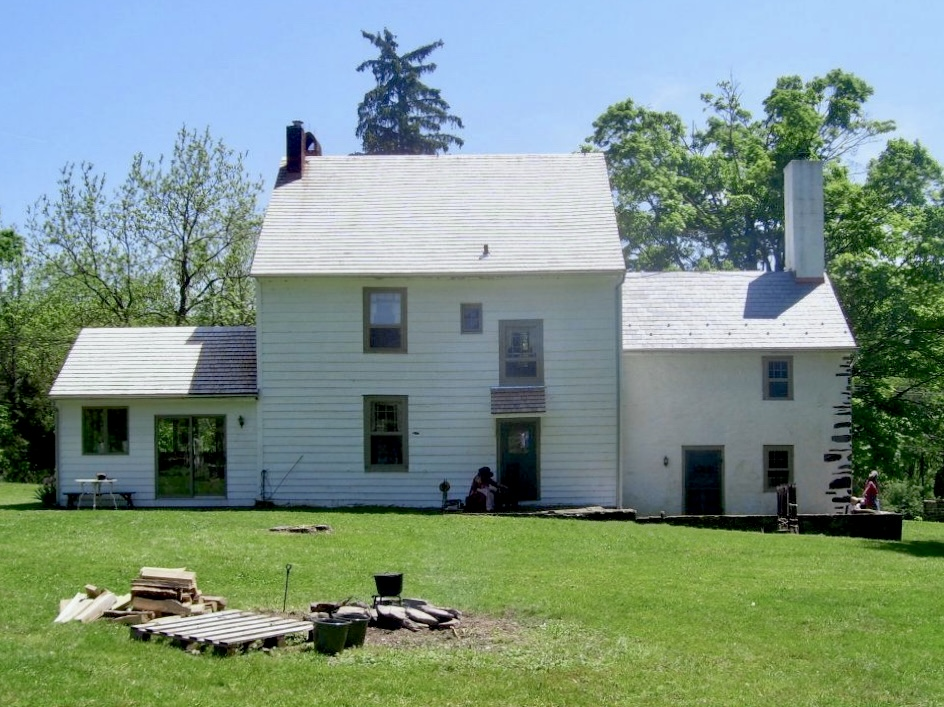
Major Henry Phillips House

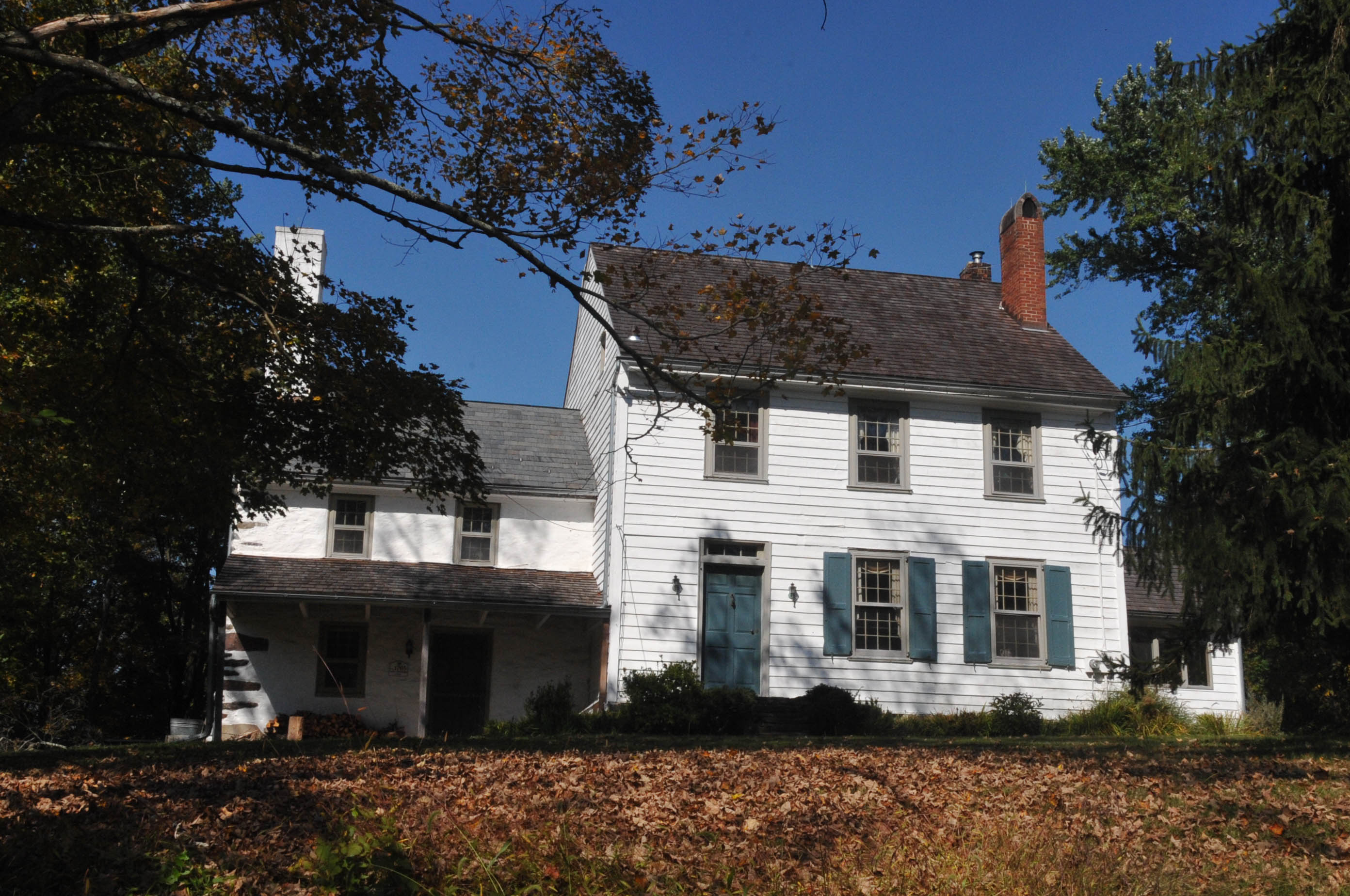
Historic colonial

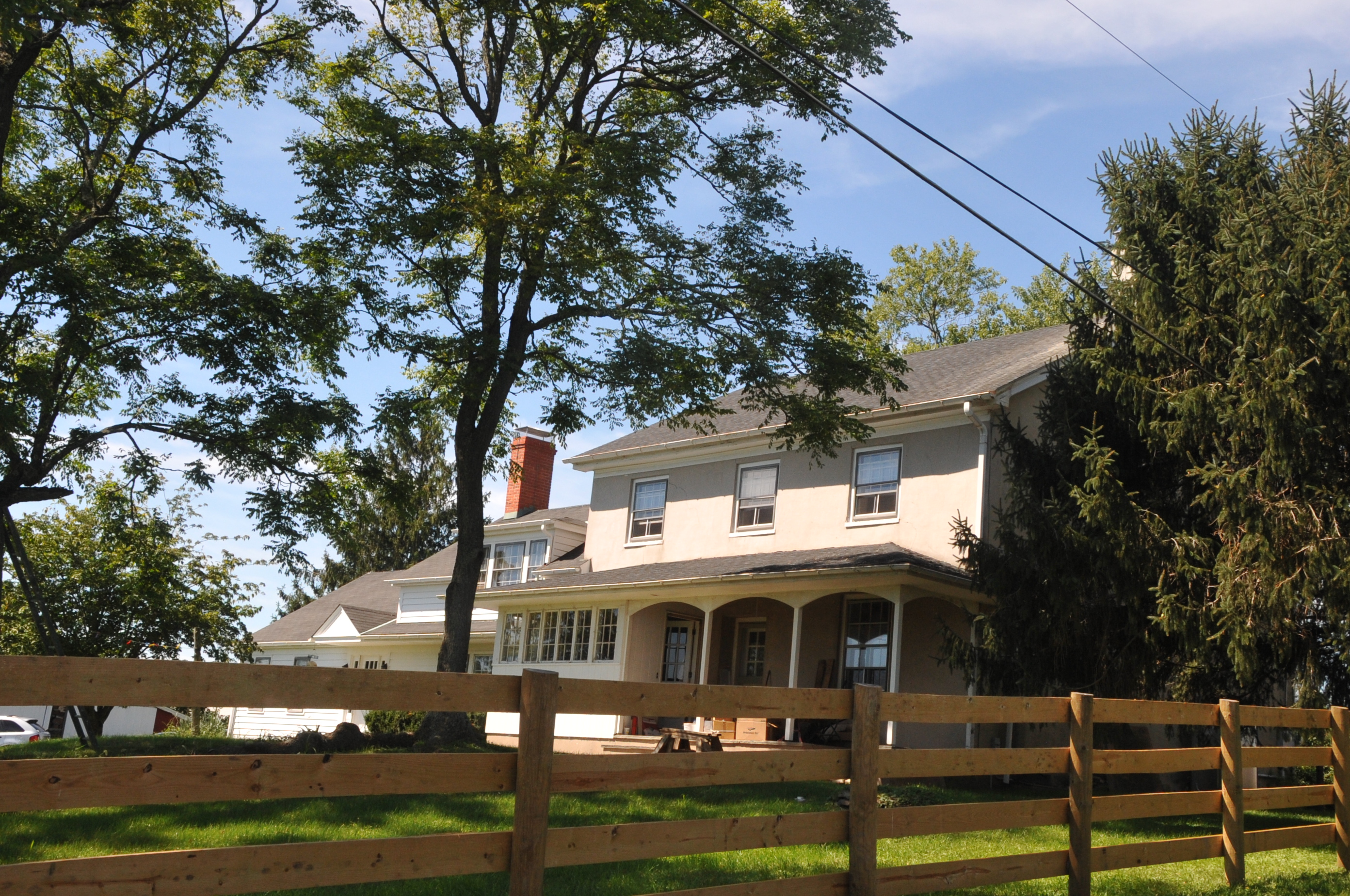
Privately owned colonial along Woodens Lane

== Transportation ==
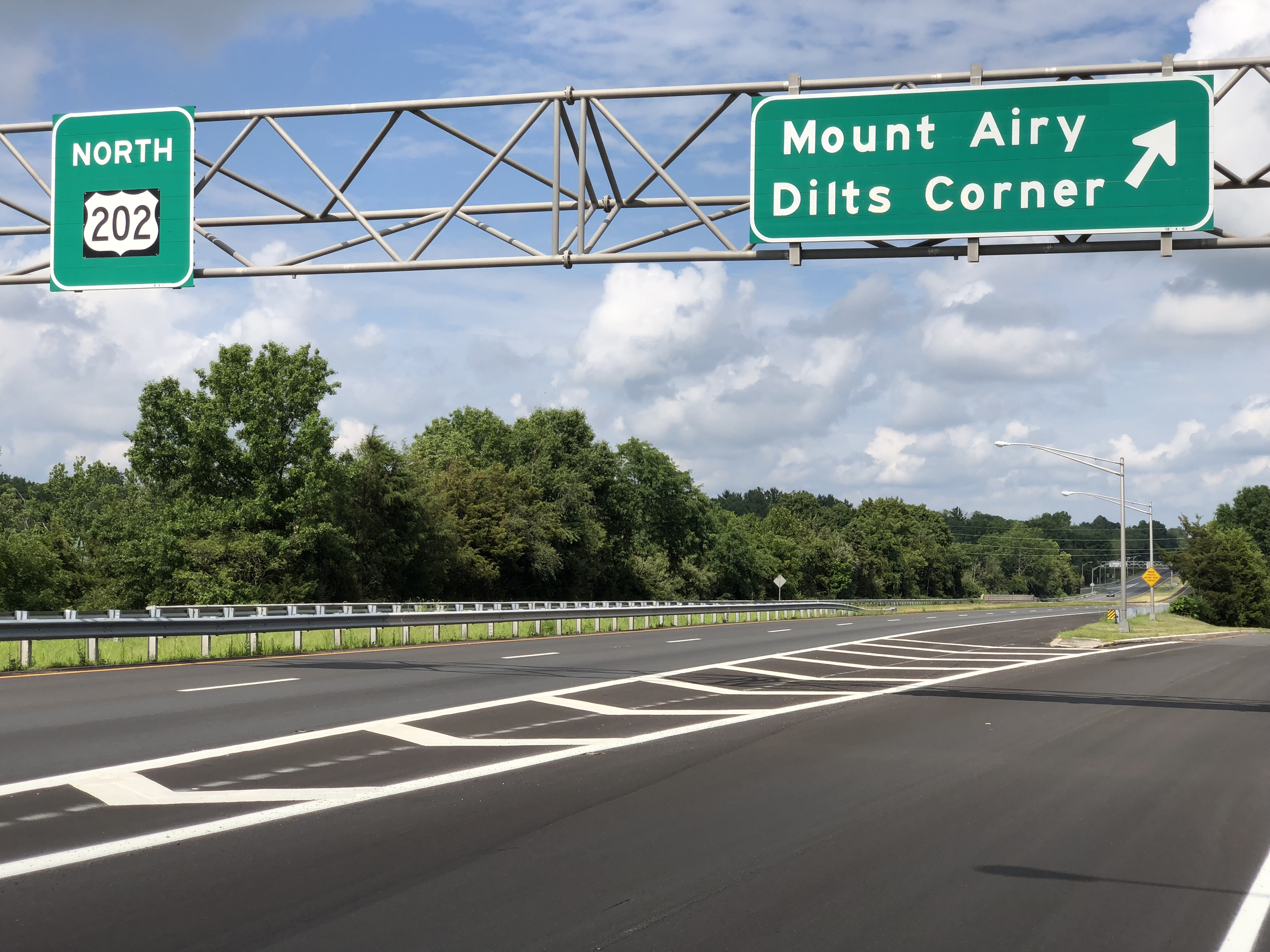
U.S. Route 202 northbound in West Amwell

=== Roads and highways ===
As of May 2010, the township had a total of 56.52 miles (90.96 km) of roadways, of which 37.75 miles (60.75 km) were maintained by the municipality, 8.43 miles (13.57 km) by Hunterdon County and 10.34 miles (16.64 km) by the New Jersey Department of Transportation.

Route 29 passes through the southwestern part of the municipality, but without any roads that connect to the heart of the township. Route 31 passes along the eastern border with East Amwell. Route 179 and U.S. Route 202 pass through around the northwestern part of the municipality. Major county roads that go through the township include County Route 518 and County Route 579. The closest interstate highway is Interstate 295 which is outside the township in neighboring Hopewell.

=== Public transportation ===
NJ Transit offers bus service to Trenton on the 608 route.
