= West Amwell Township School District =

School district in Hunterdon County, New Jersey, US

Coordinates: 40.386764°N 74.919334°W

Address
- 1417 Route 179 West Amwell Township, Hunterdon County, New Jersey, 08530; United States

District information
- Grades: K-6
- Superintendent: Michael G. Kozak
- Business administrator: Sue Simonye
- Schools: 1

Students and staff
- Enrollment: 244 (as of 2011-12)
- Faculty: 23.6 FTEs
- Student–teacher ratio: 10.34:1

Other information
- District Factor Group: FG
- Website: www.westamwellschool.org
Ind.	Per pupil	District spending	Rank (*)	K-6 average	%± vs. average
1A	Total Spending	$19,251	43	$18,891	1.9%
1	Budgetary Cost	15,491	37	13,649	13.5%
2	Classroom Instruction	9,761	39	8,366	16.7%
6	Support Services	2,532	40	2,161	17.2%
8	Administrative Cost	1,846	49	1,467	25.8%
10	Operations & Maintenance	1,348	19	1,552	−13.1%
13	Extracurricular Activities	4	1	39	−89.7%
16	Median Teacher Salary	64,392	51	57,437
Data from NJDoE 2014 Taxpayers' Guide to Education Spending. *Of K-6 districts with any number of students. Lowest spending=1; Highest=59

The West Amwell Township School District was a community public school district that served students in pre-Kindergarten through sixth grade from West Amwell Township, in Hunterdon County, in the U.S. state of New Jersey. The district's school is now part of the South Hunterdon Regional School District, which also includes Lambertville and Stockton.

In a special election held in September 2013, voters from Lambertville, Stockton and West Amwell Township passed referendums to dissolve the South Hunterdon Regional High School District and to combine the three existing K-6 school districts from each municipality (Lambertville City School District, Stockton Borough School District and West Amwell Township School District), with majorities in each community passing both ballot items. A single combined regional district would be created, serving students in pre-Kindergarten through twelfth grade, in which property taxes would be levied under a formula in which 57% is based on property values and 43% on the number of students. The executive county superintendent will appoint an interim board of education for the new regional district, which will be responsible for implementing the merger.

As of the 2011-12 school year, the district's one school had an enrollment of 244 students and 23.6 classroom teachers (on an FTE basis), for a student–teacher ratio of 10.34:1.

The district was classified by the New Jersey Department of Education as being in District Factor Group "FG", the fourth-highest of eight groupings. District Factor Groups organize districts statewide to allow comparison by common socioeconomic characteristics of the local districts. From lowest socioeconomic status to highest, the categories are A, B, CD, DE, FG, GH, I and J.

Public school students in seventh through twelfth grades attended the South Hunterdon Regional High School in Lambertville, part of the South Hunterdon Regional High School District, which serves students from Lambertville, Stockton and West Amwell Township.

== School ==
The West Amwell Township Elementary School had an enrollment of 244 students as of the 2011-12 school year.

- Scott Uribe, principal

== Administration ==
Core members of the district's administration were:

- Michael G. Kozak, superintendent
- Sue Simonye, business administrator and board secretary
