= Stockton, New Jersey =

Borough in Hunterdon County, New Jersey, US

- Borough
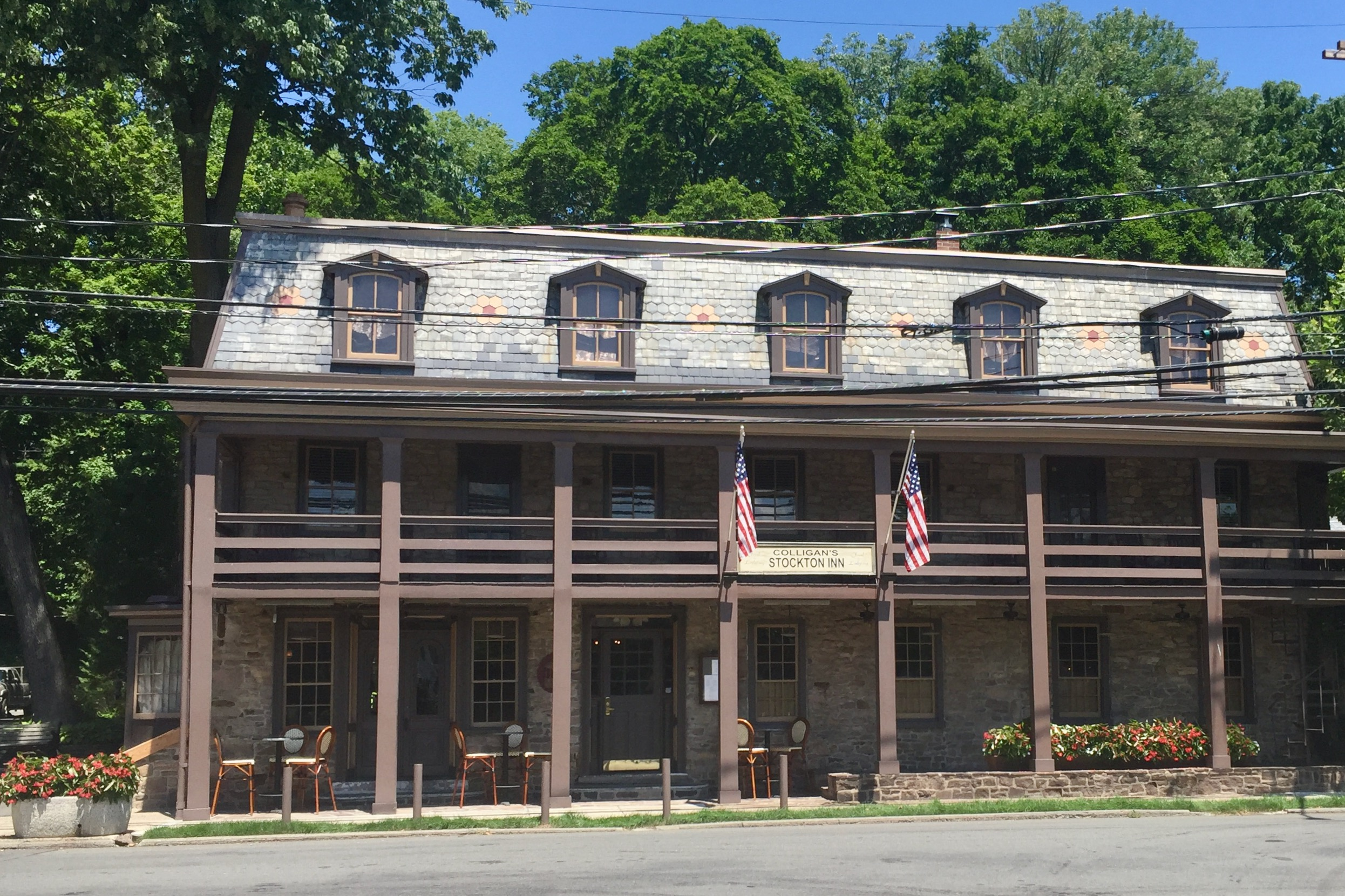
- The Stockton Inn

- Seal

- Location of Stockton in Hunterdon County highlighted in red (left). Inset map: Location of Hunterdon County in New Jersey highlighted in orange (right).

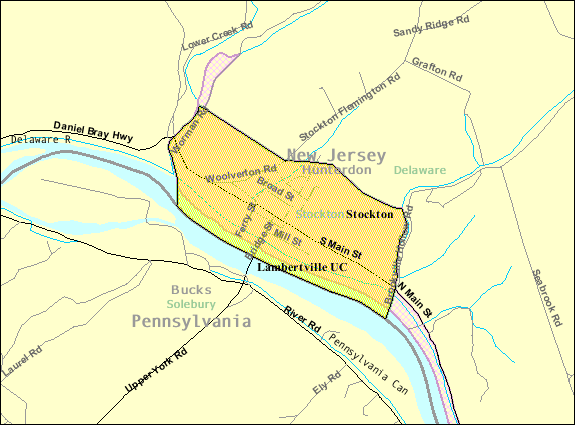
- Census Bureau map of Stockton, New Jersey

- Location in Hunterdon County Location in New Jersey Location in the United States
- Coordinates: 40.405851°N 74.970627°W
- Country: United States
- State: New Jersey
- County: Hunterdon
- Incorporated: April 14, 1898

Government
  - Type: Borough
  - Body: Borough Council
  - Mayor: Aaron R. Lipsen (D, term ends December 31, 2026)
  - Administrator / Municipal clerk: Monica Orlando

Area
  - Total: 0.62 sq mi (1.61 km^{2})
  - Land: 0.54 sq mi (1.41 km^{2})
  - Water: 0.073 sq mi (0.19 km^{2}) 12.10%
  - Rank: 537th of 565 in state 26th of 26 in county
- Elevation: 121 ft (37 m)

Population (2020)
  - Total: 495
  - Estimate (2023): 494
  - Rank: 552nd of 565 in state 26th of 26 in county
  - Density: 906.2/sq mi (349.9/km^{2})
  - Rank: 394th of 565 in state 11th of 26 in county
- Time zone: UTC−05:00 (Eastern (EST))
  - Summer (DST): UTC−04:00 (Eastern (EDT))
- ZIP Code: 08559
- Area code: 609
- FIPS code: 3401970980
- GNIS feature ID: 0885409
- Website: www.stocktonboronj.us

Stockton is a borough in Hunterdon County, in the U.S. state of New Jersey. The borough sits on the Delaware River at the western end of Amwell Valley. As of the 2020 United States census, the borough's population was 495, a decrease of 43 (−8.0%) from the 2010 census count of 538, which in turn reflected a decline of 22 (−3.9%) from the 560 counted in the 2000 census.

Stockton was incorporated as a borough by an act of the New Jersey Legislature on April 14, 1898, from portions of Delaware Township.

== History ==
Stockton is located along the Delaware River north of Lambertville. The community was first known as Reading Ferry and later as Howell's Ferry. The name was changed to Centre Bridge Station to match the name of the post office and hamlet on the Pennsylvania side of the river. The name became Stockton with the creation of a railroad station and a local post office in 1851. The community was named in honor of U.S. Senator Robert Field Stockton, who was instrumental in the creation of the Delaware and Raritan Canal. Stockton soon began to develop as an industrious town with mills and quarries sprouting in the area. In 1852, the Belvidere Delaware Railroad reached Stocktomand accelerated its prosperity. The borough was incorporated in 1898, having been separated from Delaware Township.

=== Historic locations and sightseeing ===
The Stockton Inn (formerly known as Colligan's Stockton Inn) was established in 1710. The inn's Dog & Deer Tavern first opened in 1796. The inn was the inspiration for Lorenz Hart for his hit song "There's a Small Hotel" sung in the 1936 Broadway musical On Your Toes. First built as a private residence it is believed to have been converted to an inn around 1832.

The Delaware River Mill Society was formed to preserve and promote the buildings and site known as Prallsville Mills. John Prall Jr., became the owner of the site in 1794 and with his settlement the area became known as Prallsville.

The Delaware River Mill Society is a private non-profit organization responsible for the restoration, maintenance, and operation of the historic John Prall Jr. House and the Prallsville Mills Complex, which was listed on the National Register of Historic Places in 1973. The entire property became part of the D & R Canal State Park in 1973. In 1976 when the State of New Jersey was unable to fund the restoration of its newly acquired Prallsville Mills, local citizens formed the Delaware River Mill Society, to "restore, preserve, operate, maintain and interpret" the historic site.

Prallsville Mills has become a place of cultural and environmental events attracting widespread participation. Visitors can tour 10 historic buildings including an 1877 grist mill, a 1790 linseed oil mill, an 1850 saw mill and a 1900 grain silo. Concerts, art exhibitions, antique shows, holiday parties, school fund-raiser auctions, meetings, as well as private parties, are a source of income for restoration and maintenance of the site. The site currently includes artist Ty Hodanish's studio and gallery, known as The Art Colony, which is housed in the Linseed Mill. The Mill is also situated in the center of the Delaware River Scenic Byway.

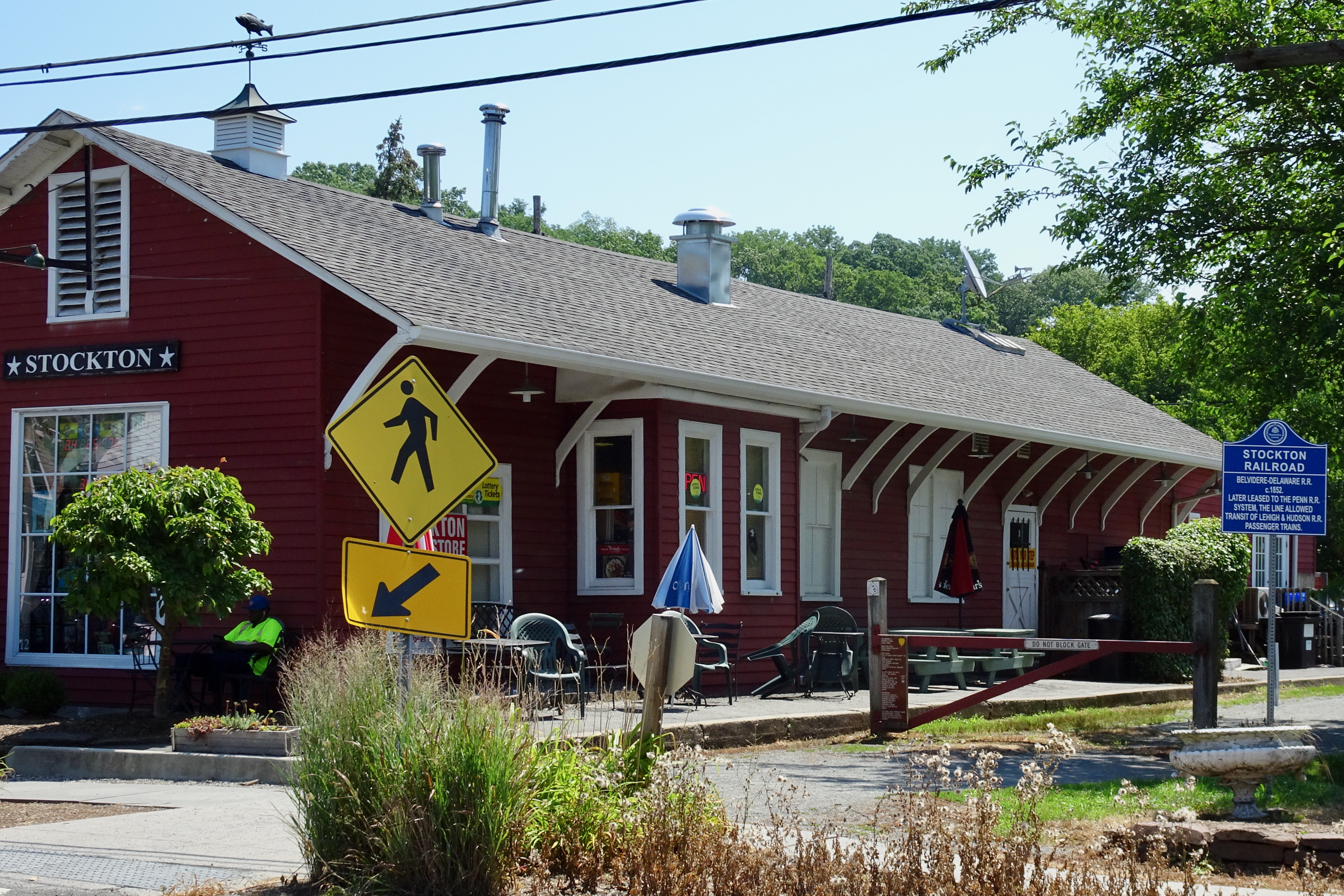
Former station for the Belvidere Delaware Railroad

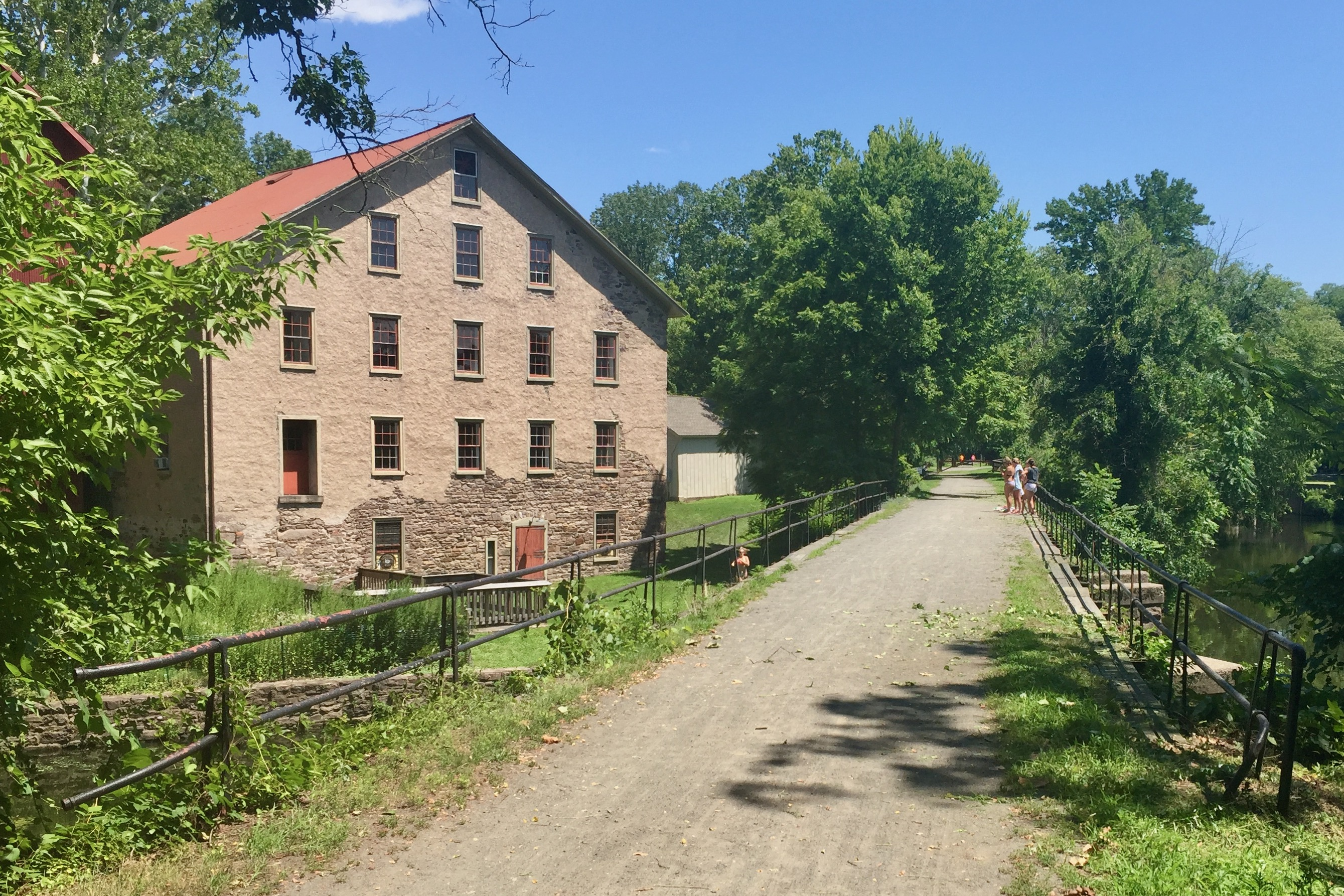
Prallsville Mills by the Delaware and Raritan Canal

== Geography ==
According to the United States Census Bureau, the borough had a total area of 0.62 square miles (1.61 km^{2}), including 0.55 square miles (1.41 km^{2}) of land and 0.08 square miles (0.19 km^{2}) of water (12.10%).

The borough borders Delaware Township in Hunterdon County and Solebury Township in Bucks County, Pennsylvania.

Prallsville is an unincorporated community located along the border with Delaware Township.

== Demographics ==
Historical population
Census	Pop.	Note	%±
1900	590		—
1910	605		2.5%
1920	519		−14.2%
1930	556		7.1%
1940	478		−14.0%
1950	488		2.1%
1960	520		6.6%
1970	619		19.0%
1980	643		3.9%
1990	629		−2.2%
2000	560		−11.0%
2010	538		−3.9%
2020	495		−8.0%
2023 (est.)	494	▼	−0.2%
Population sources: 1900–1920; 1900–1910 1910–1930; 1940–2000 2000; 2010 2020

=== 2010 census ===
The 2010 United States census counted 538 people, 237 households, and 142 families in the borough. The population density was 1,005.6 inhabitants per square mile (388.3/km^{2}). There were 259 housing units at an average density of 484.1 per square mile (186.9/km^{2}). The racial makeup was 98.33% (529) White, 0.00% (0) Black or African American, 0.00% (0) Native American, 0.93% (5) Asian, 0.00% (0) Pacific Islander, 0.00% (0) from other races, and 0.74% (4) from two or more races. Hispanic or Latino of any race were 0.56% (3) of the population.

Of the 237 households, 23.2% had children under the age of 18; 48.5% were married couples living together; 7.2% had a female householder with no husband present and 40.1% were non-families. Of all households, 32.1% were made up of individuals and 11.8% had someone living alone who was 65 years of age or older. The average household size was 2.27 and the average family size was 2.94.

19.5% of the population were under the age of 18, 5.9% from 18 to 24, 21.4% from 25 to 44, 35.1% from 45 to 64, and 18.0% who were 65 years of age or older. The median age was 47.7 years. For every 100 females, the population had 94.2 males. For every 100 females ages 18 and older there were 96.8 males.

The Census Bureau's 2006–2010 American Community Survey showed that (in 2010 inflation-adjusted dollars) median household income was $58,750 (with a margin of error of +/− $19,736) and the median family income was $72,321 (+/− $19,152). Males had a median income of $61,250 (+/− $24,259) versus $42,273 (+/− $34,015) for females. The per capita income for the borough was $38,153 (+/− $7,749). About none of families and 5.4% of the population were below the poverty line, including none of those under age 18 and 1.8% of those age 65 or over.

=== 2000 census ===
As of the 2000 United States census there were 560 people, 246 households, and 148 families residing in the borough. The population density was 1,026.5 inhabitants per square mile (396.3/km^{2}). There were 258 housing units at an average density of 472.9 per square mile (182.6/km^{2}). The racial makeup of the borough was 98.57% White, 0.89% Asian, and 0.54% from two or more races. Hispanic or Latino of any race were 0.54% of the population.

There were 246 households, out of which 28.5% had children under the age of 18 living with them, 50.4% were married couples living together, 6.5% had a female householder with no husband present, and 39.8% were non-families. 30.5% of all households were made up of individuals, and 11.0% had someone living alone who was 65 years of age or older. The average household size was 2.28 and the average family size was 2.94.

In the borough the population was spread out, with 21.3% under the age of 18, 4.3% from 18 to 24, 34.5% from 25 to 44, 25.2% from 45 to 64, and 14.8% who were 65 years of age or older. The median age was 41 years. For every 100 females, there were 87.9 males. For every 100 females age 18 and over, there were 85.3 males.

The median income for a household in the borough was $51,406, and the median income for a family was $65,000. Males had a median income of $42,083 versus $36,250 for females. The per capita income for the borough was $25,712. About 1.3% of families and 2.0% of the population were below the poverty line, including 1.7% of those under age 18 and 1.0% of those age 65 or over.

== Government ==
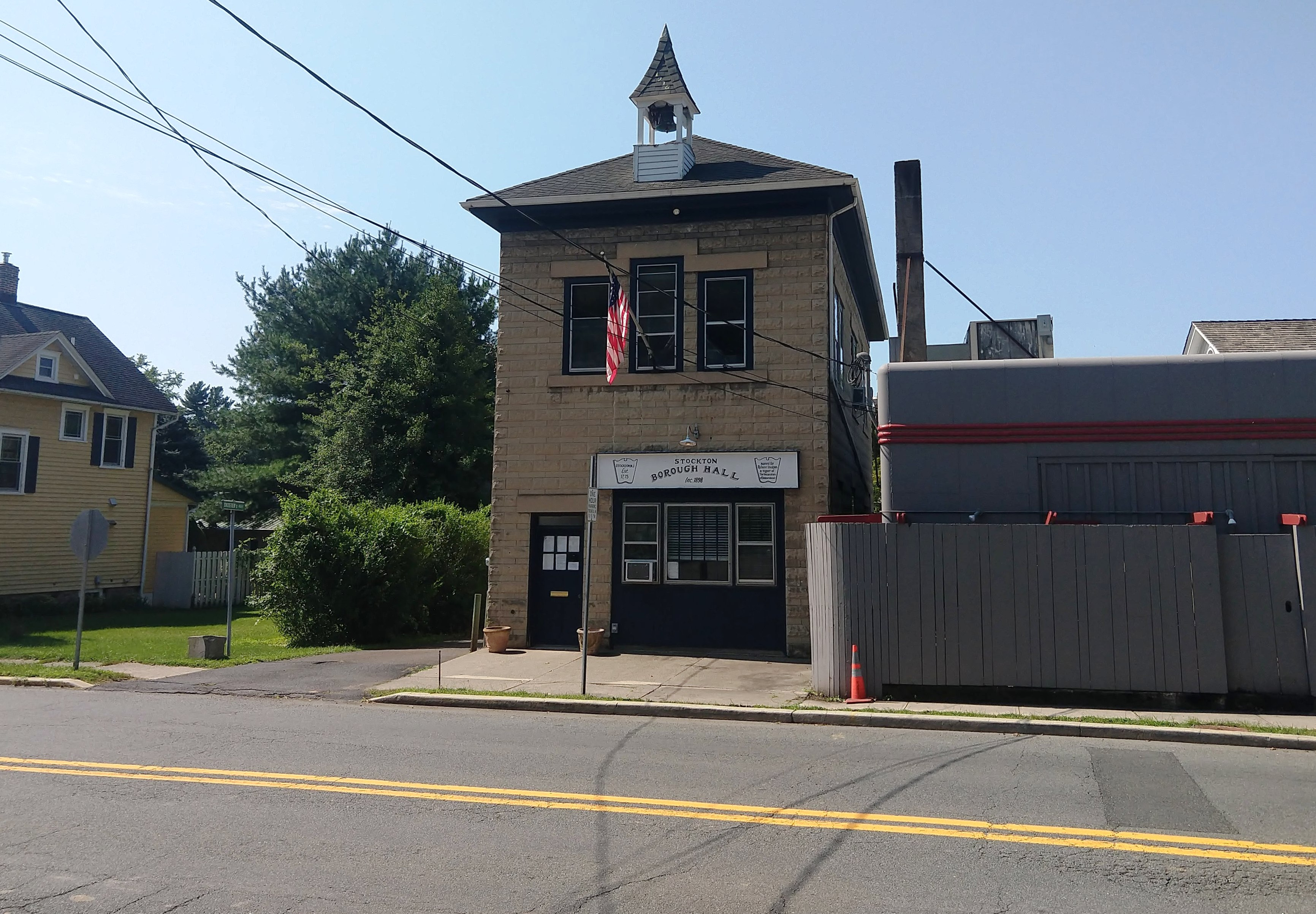
Stockton Borough Hall

=== Local government ===
Stockton is governed under the borough form of New Jersey municipal government, which is used in 218 municipalities (of the 564) statewide, making it the most common government form in New Jersey. The governing body is comprised of the mayor and the borough council, with all positions elected at-large on a partisan basis as part of the November general election. The mayor is elected directly by the voters to a four-year term of office. The borough council includes six members elected to serve three-year terms on a staggered basis, with two seats coming up for election each year in a three-year cycle. The borough form of government used by Stockton is a "weak mayor / strong council" government in which council members act as the legislative body with the mayor presiding at meetings and voting only in the event of a tie. The mayor can veto ordinances subject to an override by a two-thirds majority vote of the council. The mayor makes committee and liaison assignments for council members, and most appointments are made by the mayor with the advice and consent of the council.

As of 2026, the mayor of Stockton Borough is Democrat Aaron R. Lipsen, whose term of office ends December 31, 2026. Members of the borough council are Council President Michael L. Mann (D, 2026), Nina Brander (D, 2029) William Brown (D, 2026), Matthew Fisher (D, 2027), Jacob Gilinger (D, 2029), Kate Meltzer (D, 2027).

In January 2023, the borough council appointed William Brown to fill the seat expiring in December 2024 that became vacant when Aaron Lipsen took office as mayor. Brown will serve on an interim basis until the November 2023 general election, when voters will choose a candidate to serve the remainder of the term of office.

Democrat Neal Esposito died in office on October 23, 2014, and was reelected posthumously for a new three-year term in the November general election. In the same election, Timothy Nemeth was elected as mayor, creating a vacancy in his seat expiring in December 2016. Democrat Adam Juncosa and Republican Anthony A. Grecco were appointed to fill the council vacancies. In the November 2015 general election, both Juncosa and Grecco were elected to serve the balance of the terms of office.

=== Federal, state and county representation ===
Stockton is located in the 7th Congressional District and is part of New Jersey's 15th state legislative district.

For the 119th United States Congress, New Jersey's 7th congressional district is represented by Thomas Kean Jr. (R, Westfield). New Jersey is represented in the United States Senate by Democrats Cory Booker (Newark, term ends 2027) and Andy Kim (Moorestown, term ends 2031).

For the 2026–2027 session, the 15th legislative district of the New Jersey Legislature is represented in the State Senate by Shirley Turner (D, Lawrence Township) and in the General Assembly by Verlina Reynolds-Jackson (D, Trenton) and Anthony Verrelli (D, Hopewell Township).

Hunterdon County is governed by a Board of County Commissioners comprised of five members who are elected at-large on a partisan basis to serve three-year terms of office on a staggered basis, with either one or two seats up for election each year as part of the November general election. At an annual reorganization meeting held each January, the commissioners select one member to serve as the board's Director and another to serve as Deputy Director, each for a one-year term. As of 2025, Hunterdon County's Commissioners are Director John E. Lanza (R; Raritan Township, 2025), Deputy Director Shaun C. Van Doren (R; Tewksbury Township, 2026), Jeff Kuhl (R; Raritan Township, 2027), Zachary T. Rich (R; West Amwell Township, 2025) and Susan Soloway (R; Franklin Township, 2027).

Constitutional officers elected on a countywide basis are Clerk Mary H. Melfi (R; Flemington, 2026), Sheriff Fredrick W. Brown (R; Alexandria Township, 2025) and Surrogate Heidi Rohrbach (R; Lebanon Township, 2028).

=== Politics ===
As of March 2011, there were a total of 396 registered voters in Stockton, of which 166 (41.9%) were registered as Democrats, 127 (32.1%) were registered as Republicans and 102 (25.8%) were registered as Unaffiliated. There was one voter registered to another party.

Gubernatorial election results for Stockton
Year	Republican		Democratic		Third party(ies)	
Year	No.	%	No.	%	No.	%
2025	116	38.67%	181	60.33%	3	1.00%
2021	108	40.45%	155	58.05%	4	1.50%
2017	98	40.33%	137	56.38%	8	3.29%
2013	131	60.09%	81	37.16%	6	2.75%
2009	122	46.04%	116	43.77%	27	10.19%
2005	108	41.70%	138	53.28%	13	5.02%

In the 2012 presidential election, Democrat Barack Obama received 58.2% of the vote (174 cast), ahead of Republican Mitt Romney with 40.1% (120 votes), and other candidates with 1.7% (5 votes), among the 300 ballots cast by the borough's 399 registered voters (1 ballot was spoiled), for a turnout of 75.2%. In the 2008 presidential election, Democrat Barack Obama received 59.3% of the vote (210 cast), ahead of Republican John McCain with 38.1% (135 votes) and other candidates with 1.4% (5 votes), among the 354 ballots cast by the borough's 405 registered voters, for a turnout of 87.4%. In the 2004 presidential election, Democrat John Kerry received 57.3% of the vote (200 ballots cast), outpolling Republican George W. Bush with 41.5% (145 votes) and other candidates with 1.0% (4 votes), among the 349 ballots cast by the borough's 412 registered voters, for a turnout percentage of 84.7.

United States presidential election results for Stockton
Year	Republican		Democratic		Third party(ies)	
Year	No.	%	No.	%	No.	%
2024	127	36.18%	217	61.82%	7	1.99%
2020	128	33.51%	245	64.14%	9	2.36%
2016	115	34.23%	198	58.93%	23	6.85%
2012	120	40.13%	174	58.19%	5	1.67%
2008	135	38.57%	210	60.00%	5	1.43%
2004	145	41.55%	200	57.31%	4	1.15%

In the 2013 gubernatorial election, Republican Chris Christie received 60.1% of the vote (131 cast), ahead of Democrat Barbara Buono with 37.2% (81 votes), and other candidates with 2.8% (6 votes), among the 221 ballots cast by the borough's 393 registered voters (3 ballots were spoiled), for a turnout of 56.2%. In the 2009 gubernatorial election, Republican Chris Christie received 45.7% of the vote (122 ballots cast), ahead of Democrat Jon Corzine with 43.4% (116 votes), Independent Chris Daggett with 8.2% (22 votes) and other candidates with 1.9% (5 votes), among the 267 ballots cast by the borough's 398 registered voters, yielding a 67.1% turnout.

United States Senate election results for Stockton1
Year	Republican		Democratic		Third party(ies)	
Year	No.	%	No.	%	No.	%
2024	120	35.50%	206	60.95%	12	3.55%
2018	121	37.69%	187	58.26%	13	4.05%
2012	109	38.25%	164	57.54%	12	4.21%
2006	108	40.15%	148	55.02%	13	4.83%

United States Senate election results for Stockton2
Year	Republican		Democratic		Third party(ies)	
Year	No.	%	No.	%	No.	%
2020	126	33.51%	238	63.30%	12	3.19%
2014	72	35.64%	119	58.91%	11	5.45%
2013	63	41.72%	83	54.97%	5	3.31%
2008	152	45.65%	162	48.65%	19	5.71%

== Education ==
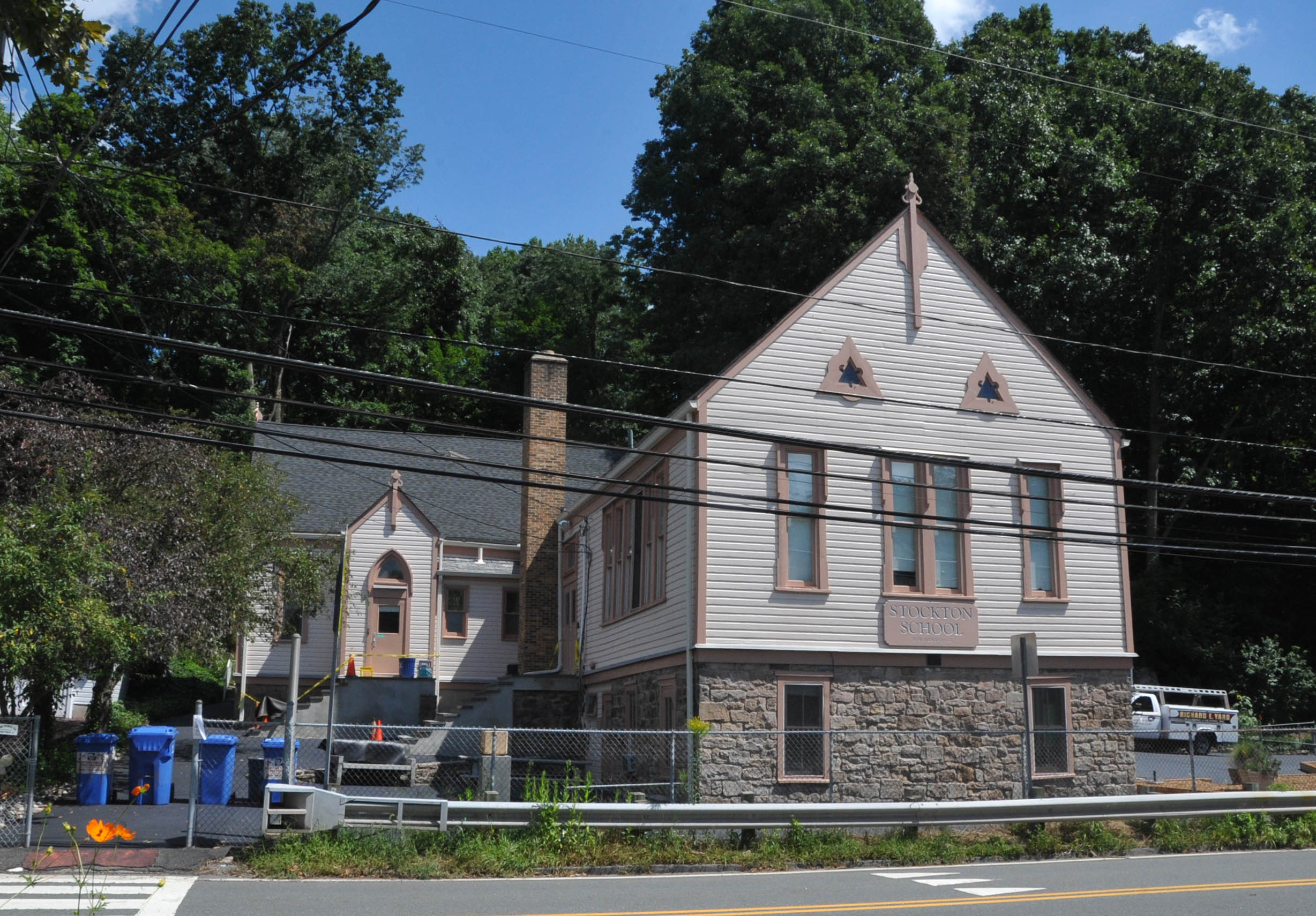
District No. 98 Schoolhouse

Stockton is part of the South Hunterdon Regional School District, which serves students in pre-kindergarten through twelfth grade from Lambertville, Stockton and West Amwell Township. As of the 2022–23 school year, the district, comprised of three schools, had an enrollment of 827 students and 108.1 classroom teachers (on an FTE basis), for a student–teacher ratio of 7.7:1. Schools in the district (with 2022–23 enrollment data from the National Center for Education Statistics) are South Hunterdon Regional Elementary School for grades PreK–4 (was Lambertville Public School, which had 221 students in grades PreK–6), South Hunterdon Regional Middle School for grades 5–8 (was West Amwell School, with 170 students in grades K–6) and South Hunterdon Regional High School for grades 9–12 (which had 417 students in grades 7–12). Stockton is assigned one of the nine seats on the regional district's board of education.

Historically, Stockton had its own school district, the Stockton Borough School District, serving students in grades K–6. The district's sole school building, the District No. 98 Schoolhouse, had been in use since 1872. In a special election held in September 2013, voters from Lambertville, Stockton and West Amwell Township passed referendums to dissolve the South Hunterdon Regional High School District and to combine the three existing school districts from each municipality (Lambertville City School District, Stockton Borough School District and West Amwell Township School District), with majorities in each community passing both ballot items. A single combined regional district was created, serving students in grades Pre-K–12, in which property taxes are levied under a formula in which 57% is based on property values and 43% on the number of students. The executive county superintendent appointed an interim board of education for the new regional district, which was responsible for implementing the merger. The Stockton school was closed after the 2017–2018 school year and the elementary students were sent to Lambertville and West Amwell schools.

Eighth grade students from all of Hunterdon County are eligible to apply to attend the high school programs offered by the Hunterdon County Vocational School District, a county-wide vocational school district that offers career and technical education at its campuses in Raritan Township and at programs sited at local high schools, with no tuition charged to students for attendance.

== Transportation ==
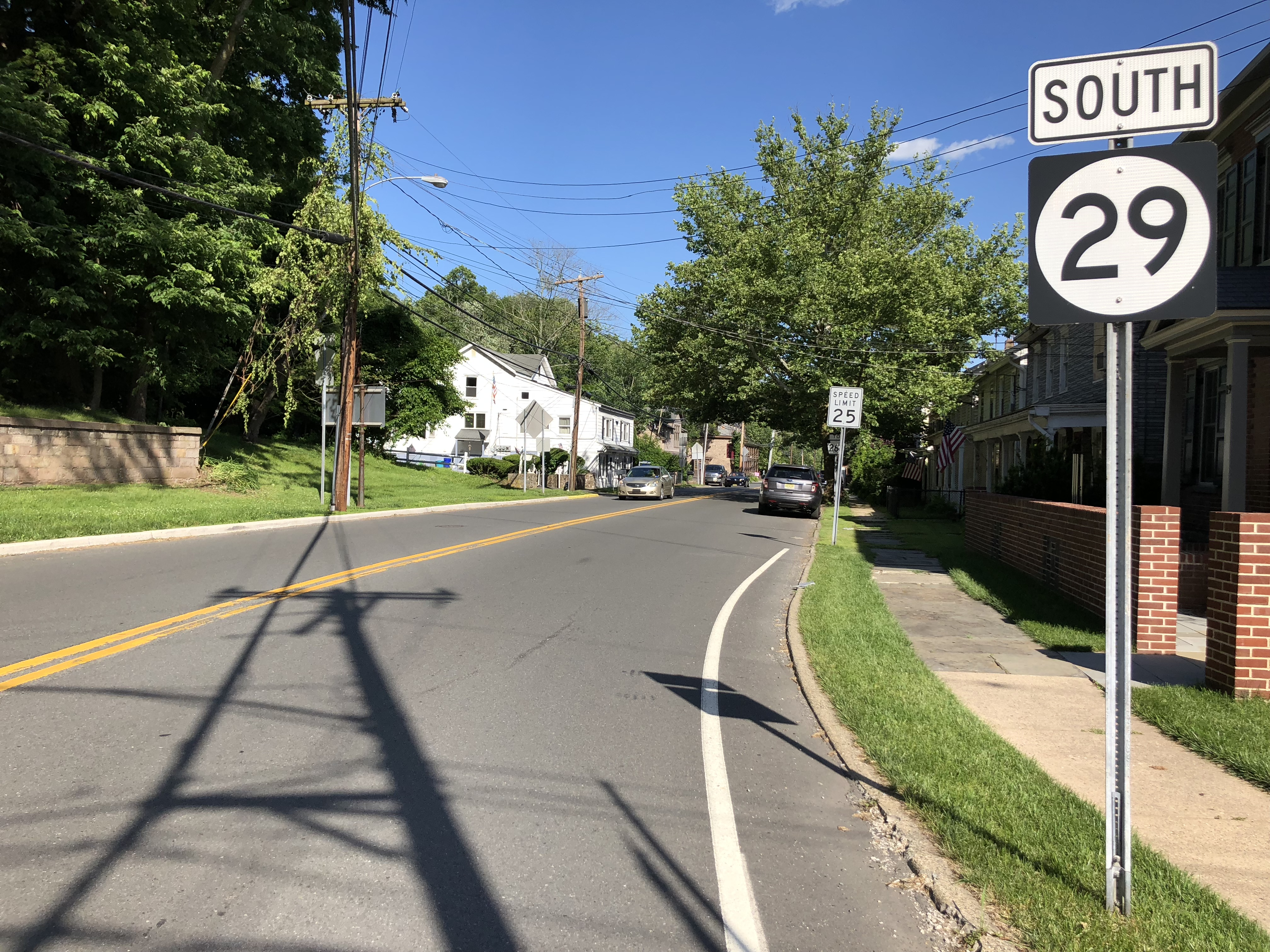
Route 29 southbound in Stockton

As of May 2010, the borough had a total of 4.09 miles (6.58 km) of roadways, of which 2.50 miles (4.02 km) were maintained by the municipality, 0.28 miles (0.45 km) by Hunterdon County and 1.31 miles (2.11 km) by the New Jersey Department of Transportation.

Route 29 and County Route 523 are the most significant highways passing through Stockton.

The Centre Bridge-Stockton Bridge is a toll-free bridge stretching 825 feet (251 m) over the Delaware River that is owned and operated by the Delaware River Joint Toll Bridge Commission, connecting Pennsylvania Route 32 and Pennsylvania Route 263 in Solebury Township, Pennsylvania, to New Jersey Route 29 in Stockton. The original bridge, constructed at the site formerly known as Reading's Ferry, was opened to traffic in the spring of 1814. The covered bridge was destroyed in a flood on January 8, 1841, striking the Lambertville Bridge on its way down the Delaware, as part of a flood that severely damaged every bridge between Easton, Pennsylvania, and Trenton.

== Notable people ==
People who were born in, residents of, or otherwise closely associated with Stockton include:

- Anne Elstner (1899–1981), actress who played the title role on the radio soap opera Stella Dallas during its entire run, from 1937–1955
- Chet Huntley (1911–1974), television newscaster, best known for co-anchoring NBC's evening news program, the Huntley-Brinkley Report, for 14 years beginning in 1956
- JP Miller (1919–2001), writer of teleplays during the Golden Age of Television
- Lansing Pilch, retired United States Air Force major general
- Carolyn Rovee-Collier (1942–2014), pioneer and expert in cognitive development
