= District No. 98 Schoolhouse =

- U.S. National Register of Historic Places
- New Jersey Register of Historic Places
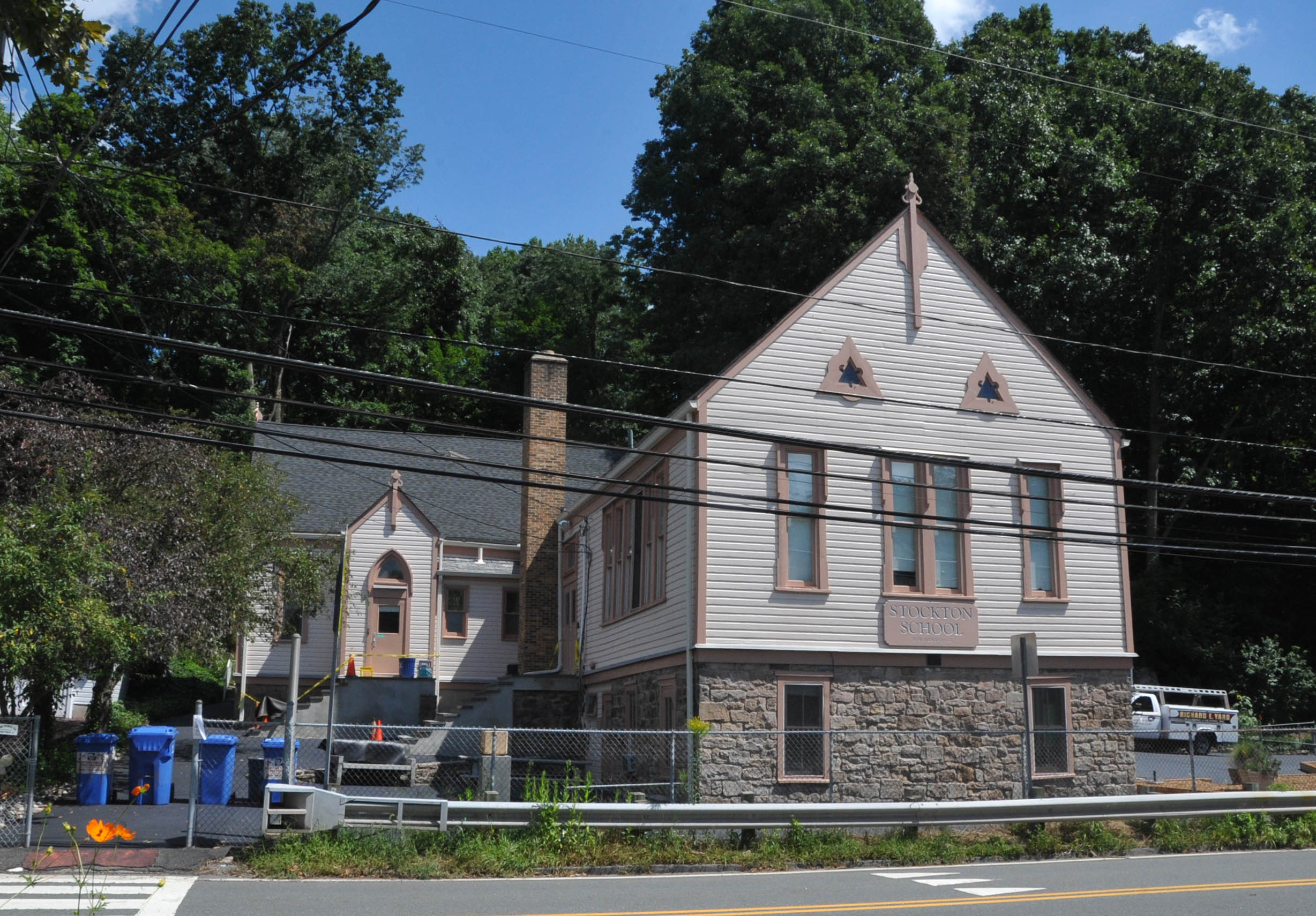

- Location within Hunterdon County, New Jersey Location within New Jersey Location within the United States
- Location: 19 South Main Street; Stockton, New Jersey
- Coordinates: 40°24′25″N 74°58′30″W
- Built: 1872
- Architect: James Bird
- Architectural style: High Victorian Gothic
- NRHP reference No.: 04001477
- NJRHP No.: 4374

Significant dates
- Added to NRHP: January 12, 2005
- Designated NJRHP: November 12, 2004

The District No. 98 Schoolhouse, also known as the Stockton School, is a historic school located at 19 South Main Street in the borough of Stockton in Hunterdon County, New Jersey. It was added to the National Register of Historic Places on January 12, 2005, for its significance in education.

== History ==
The first school building to be located on the site was constructed in 1832. The current school, designed with High Victorian Gothic style by local Lambertville architect James Bird, was constructed from 1872 to 1873. The 1832 school's cornerstone was retained for the 1872 school. The school building had just two classrooms, and within just a few years, the school was crowded due to the increased population of the Stockton area. In 1884, a front addition to the school was constructed. The addition included a third classroom and a basement coal room, which would be eventually converted into a fourth classroom. Since the 1884 addition, the exterior of the building has remained largely unchanged. In 1952, the interior of the building was renovated to add a boys' restroom and a girls' restroom. At the time of the building's nomination to the National Register of Historic Places, it was still in use as a neighborhood school. The 2017–2018 school year was the schoolhouse's final year of use as a school.

== See also ==
- National Register of Historic Places listings in Hunterdon County, New Jersey
