= Lambertville City School District =

Defunct school district in Hunterdon County, New Jersey, US

Address
- 200 North Main Street Lambertville, Hunterdon County, New Jersey, 08530; United States
- Coordinates: 40.373087°N 74.944942°W

District information
- Grades: K-6
- Superintendent: Michael G. Kozak
- Business administrator: Donna Tolley
- Schools: 1

Students and staff
- Enrollment: 203 (in 2011-12)
- Faculty: 16.1 FTEs
- Student–teacher ratio: 12.61:1

Other information
- District Factor Group: FG
- Website: http://www.lpschool.org/
Ind.	Per pupil	District spending	Rank (*)	K-6 average	%± vs. average
1A	Total Spending	$16,330	18	$18,891	−13.6%
1	Budgetary Cost	14,898	34	13,649	9.2%
2	Classroom Instruction	10,216	46	8,366	22.1%
6	Support Services	2,288	31	2,161	5.9%
8	Administrative Cost	1,188	6	1,467	−19.0%
10	Operations & Maintenance	1,197	8	1,552	−22.9%
13	Extracurricular Activities	9	7	39	−76.9%
16	Median Teacher Salary	60,674	40	57,437
Data from NJDoE 2014 Taxpayers' Guide to Education Spending. *Of K-6 districts with any number of students. Lowest spending=1; Highest=59

The Lambertville City School District is a defunct community public school district that served students in preschool through sixth grade from Lambertville, in Hunterdon County, in the U.S. state of New Jersey. In the 2014–15 school year, the school is part of the South Hunterdon Regional School District, which also serves students from Stockton and West Amwell Township.

In a special election held in September 2013, voters from Lambertville, Stockton and West Amwell Township passed referendums to dissolve the South Hunterdon Regional School District and to combine the three existing school districts from each municipality (Lambertville City School District, Stockton Borough School District and West Amwell Township School District), with majorities in each community passing both ballot items. A single combined regional district would be created, serving students in PreK-12, in which property taxes would be levied under a formula in which 57% is based on property values and 43% on the number of students. The executive county superintendent will appoint an interim board of education for the new regional district, which will be responsible for implementing the merger.

In the 2011–12 school year, the district's one school had an enrollment of 203 students and 16.1 classroom teachers (on an FTE basis), for a student–teacher ratio of 12.61:1.

The district is classified by the New Jersey Department of Education as being in District Factor Group "FG", the fourth-highest of eight groupings. District Factor Groups organize districts statewide to allow comparison by common socioeconomic characteristics of the local districts. From lowest socioeconomic status to highest, the categories are A, B, CD, DE, FG, GH, I and J.

Public school students in seventh to twelfth grades attend the South Hunterdon Regional High School in Lambertville, part of the South Hunterdon Regional High School District, which served 372 students in southern Hunterdon County as of the 2011–12 school year. Students from Lambertville, Stockton and West Amwell Township attend South Hunterdon Regional High School.

== School ==
The Lambertville Public School had an enrollment of 203 students in the 2010–11 school year.

== Administration ==
Core members of the district's administration are:

- Michael G. Kozak, superintendent
- Donna Tolley, business administrator and board secretary
