= Point Pleasant–Byram Bridge =

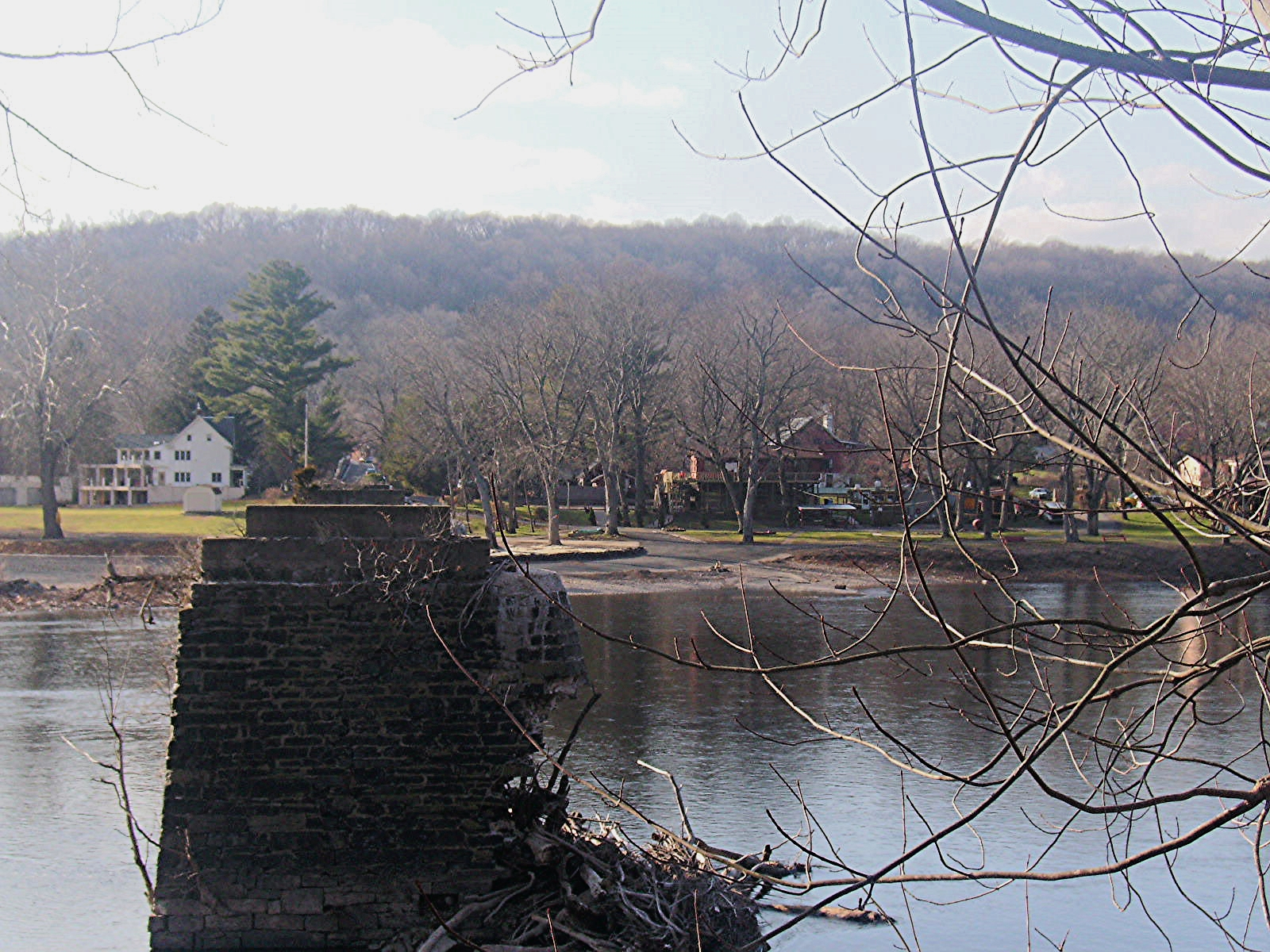
- Point Pleasant–Byram Bridge pier in November 2008
- Coordinates: 40.423899°N 75.061733°W
- Crosses: Delaware River
- Locale: Point Pleasant, Bucks County, Pennsylvania and Byram, Hunterdon County, New Jersey

Characteristics
- Design: Truss bridge

History
- Opened: 1855
- Rebuilt: 1892; 1903
- Closed: August 20, 1955

The Point Pleasant–Byram Bridge was a bridge that spanned the Delaware River between Point Pleasant, Bucks County, Pennsylvania and the Byram section of Kingwood, Hunterdon County, New Jersey.

== History and notable features ==
This bridge was a four-span, steel structure that was built in 1903 after several previous predecessor bridges (built in 1855 as a wooden covered bridge and in 1892 as a first steel structure) were wiped away by weather-related incidents. Funded by a private company, it was a toll bridge until 1919, when the Pennsylvania–New Jersey Joint Bridge Commission bought it.

One of the most modern on the river, the bridge was the first bought in Hunterdon County, New Jersey. Flooding from Hurricane Connie and Hurricane Diane in 1955 wiped away the bridge once again, along with three others along the river. Unlike the Yardley–Wilburtha and Portland–Columbia Pedestrian Bridge, the Point Pleasant–Byram Bridge was never replaced and the piers remain in the Delaware River.

== Bibliography ==
- Dale, Frank Talbot (2003). Bridges Over the Delaware River: A History of Crossings. New Brunswick, New Jersey: Rutgers University Press. ISBN 0813532132.
