= Tumble Falls, New Jersey =

Populated place in Hunterdon County, New Jersey, US

- Unincorporated community
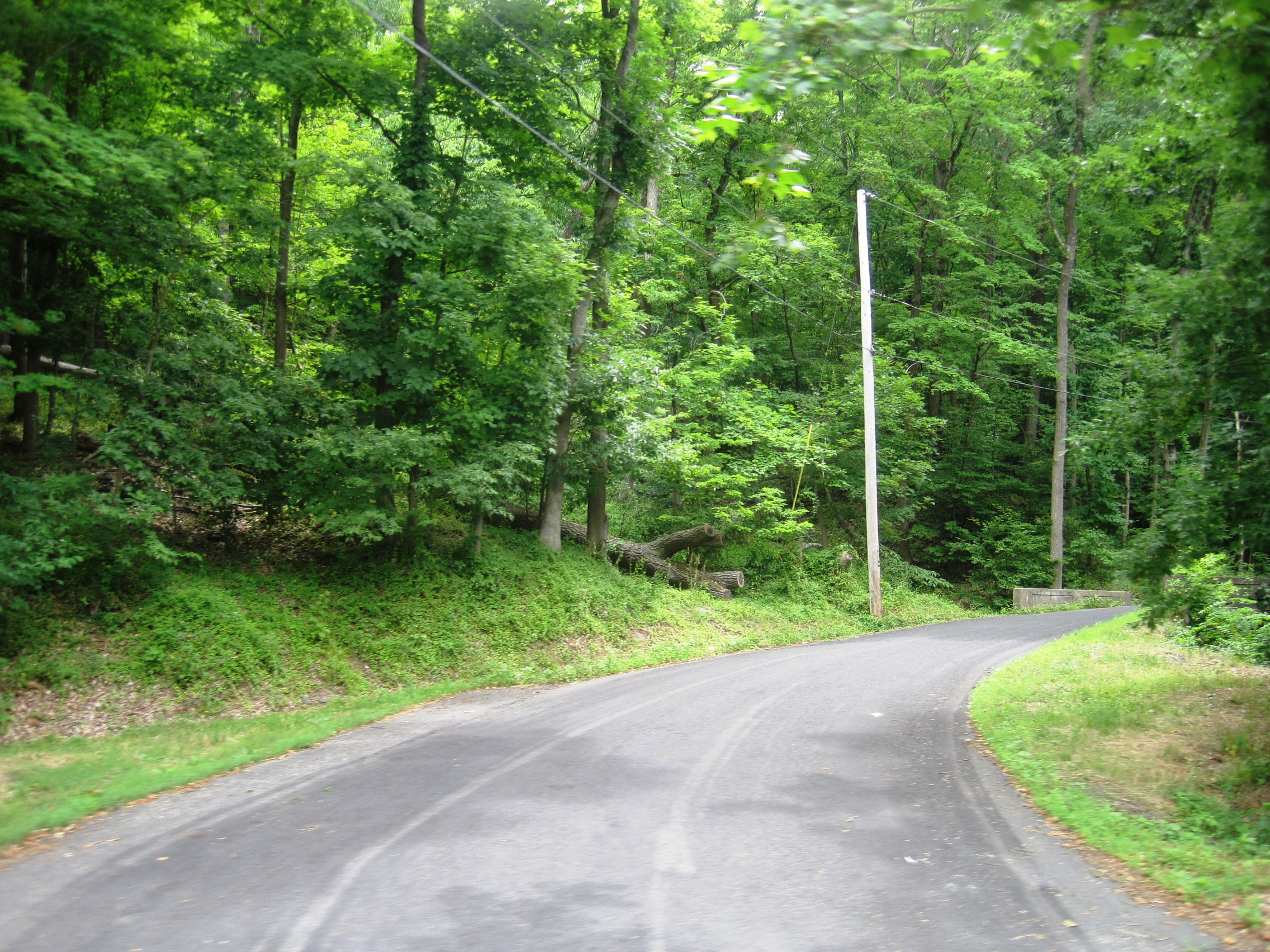
- Looking east along Tumble Falls Road from Route 29

- Location of Tumble Falls in Hunterdon County Inset: Location of county within the state of New Jersey Tumble Falls, New Jersey (New Jersey) Tumble Falls, New Jersey (the United States)
- Coordinates: 40°27′13″N 75°03′44″W
- Country: United States
- State: New Jersey
- County: Hunterdon
- Township: Kingwood
- Elevation: 433 ft (132 m)
- GNIS feature ID: 881288

Tumble Falls is an unincorporated community located within Kingwood Township in Hunterdon County, in the U.S. state of New Jersey. The settlement is located along an unnamed tributary of the Delaware River where a small intermittent waterfall is found in the central part of the township within the Lockatong Formation. The location of the waterfall is at the intersection of Tumble Falls Road and New Jersey Route 29 and is part of the New Jersey Conservation Foundation purchased from private landowners in December 2002.
