= Baptistown, New Jersey =

Populated place in Hunterdon County, New Jersey, US

- Unincorporated community
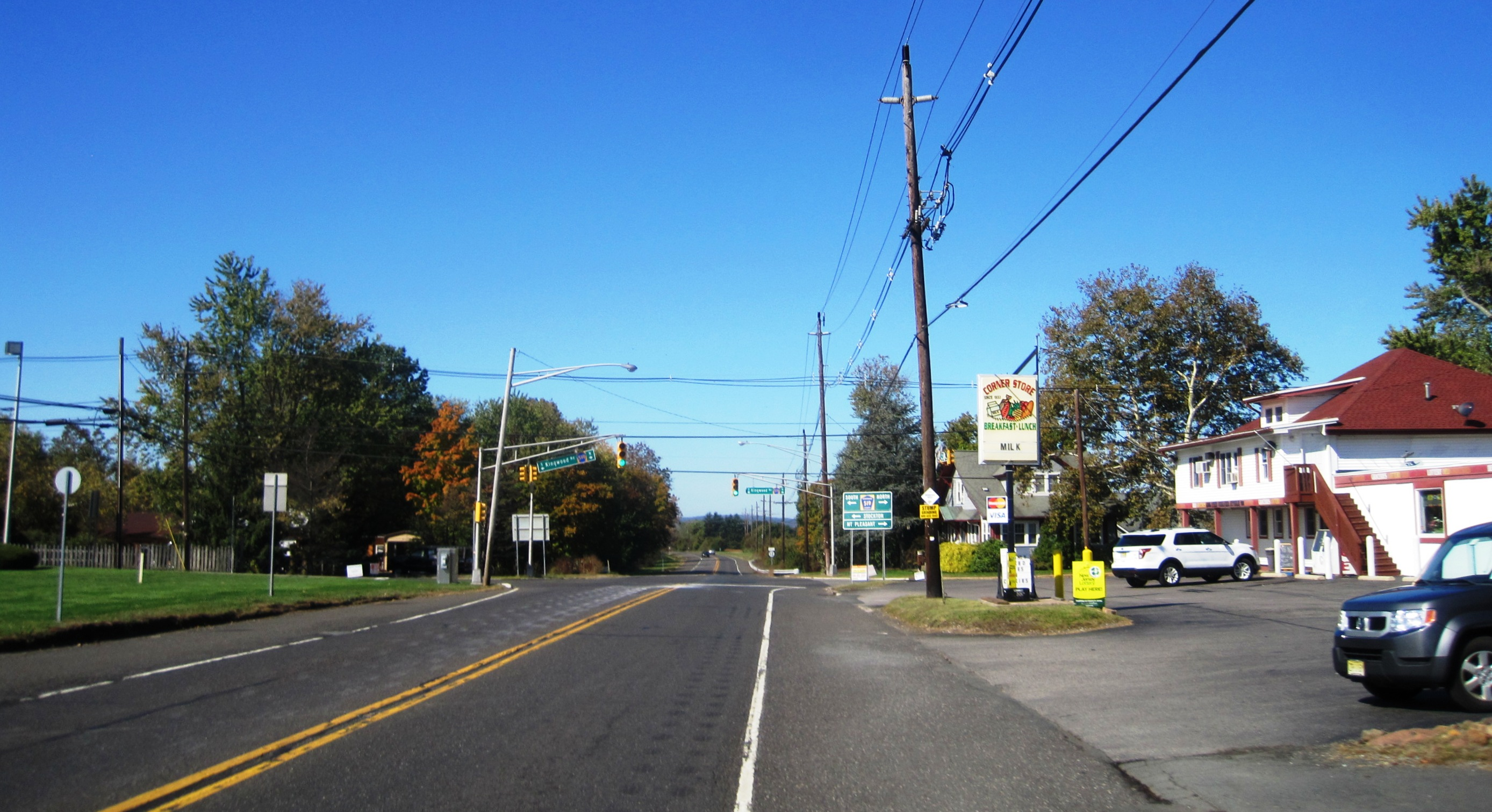
- Center of Baptistown along Route 12

- Baptistown's location in Hunterdon County (Inset: Hunterdon County in New Jersey) Baptistown, New Jersey (New Jersey) Baptistown, New Jersey (the United States)
- Coordinates: 40°31′18″N 75°00′22″W
- Country: United States
- State: New Jersey
- County: Hunterdon
- Township: Kingwood
- Elevation: 515 ft (157 m)
- Time zone: UTC−05:00 (Eastern (EST))
  - Summer (DST): UTC−04:00 (Eastern (EDT))
- ZIP Code: 08803
- Area code: 908
- GNIS feature ID: 874483

Baptistown is an unincorporated community located within Kingwood Township, in Hunterdon County, in the U.S. state of New Jersey. Baptistown is located on New Jersey Route 12, approximately three miles (4.8 km) east of Frenchtown. The township's municipal offices are located in Baptistown just north of the center of the community.

== History ==
Baptistown is named for the two Baptist churches which were founded there by early settlers.

Baptistown has a post office with ZIP Code 08803, which opened on May 1, 1822.

In 1882, Baptistown had a population of 250, and was described as "the centre of a rich farming district, with a good local business".

In 1937 there was a one-room school in Baptistown.

== Solar farms ==
Frenchtown Solar is a group of three photovoltaic arrays, or solar farms, in the state covering 110 acres (44.5 ha) with 68,500 solar panels and 20.1 megawatt capacity. Two arrays are located just outside the village Baptistown on Route 12. The third and largest is to the south off County Route 519.
