= Byram, New Jersey =

Populated place in Hunterdon County, New Jersey, US

- Unincorporated community
- Location of Byram in Hunterdon County Inset: Location of county within the state of New Jersey Byram, New Jersey (New Jersey) Byram, New Jersey (the United States)
- Coordinates: 40°25′25″N 75°03′35″W
- Country: United States
- State: New Jersey
- County: Hunterdon
- Township: Kingwood
- Elevation: 128 ft (39 m)
- GNIS feature ID: 875066

Byram is an unincorporated community within Kingwood Township in Hunterdon County, in the U.S. state of New Jersey.

In 1855 a bridge was built across the Delaware River north of Byram to connect with Point Pleasant, Pennsylvania. The Point Pleasant-Byram Bridge existed until 1955 when it was destroyed by the Great Flood of 1955 brought on by Hurricane Diane.

Byram also once had a railroad station along Pennsylvania Railroad's Belvidere Division which opened back in 1852 when the railroad reached Byram. The station was also destroyed in the Great Flood of 1955 and was never rebuilt. The railroad continued to be used for freight until 1978 when it was abandoned and subsequently demolished for a recreational trail in the early 1980s.
