= Old Stone Church (Kingwood Township, New Jersey) =

Historic church in New Jersey, United States

- Old Stone Presbyterian Church in Kingwood
- U.S. National Register of Historic Places
- New Jersey Register of Historic Places
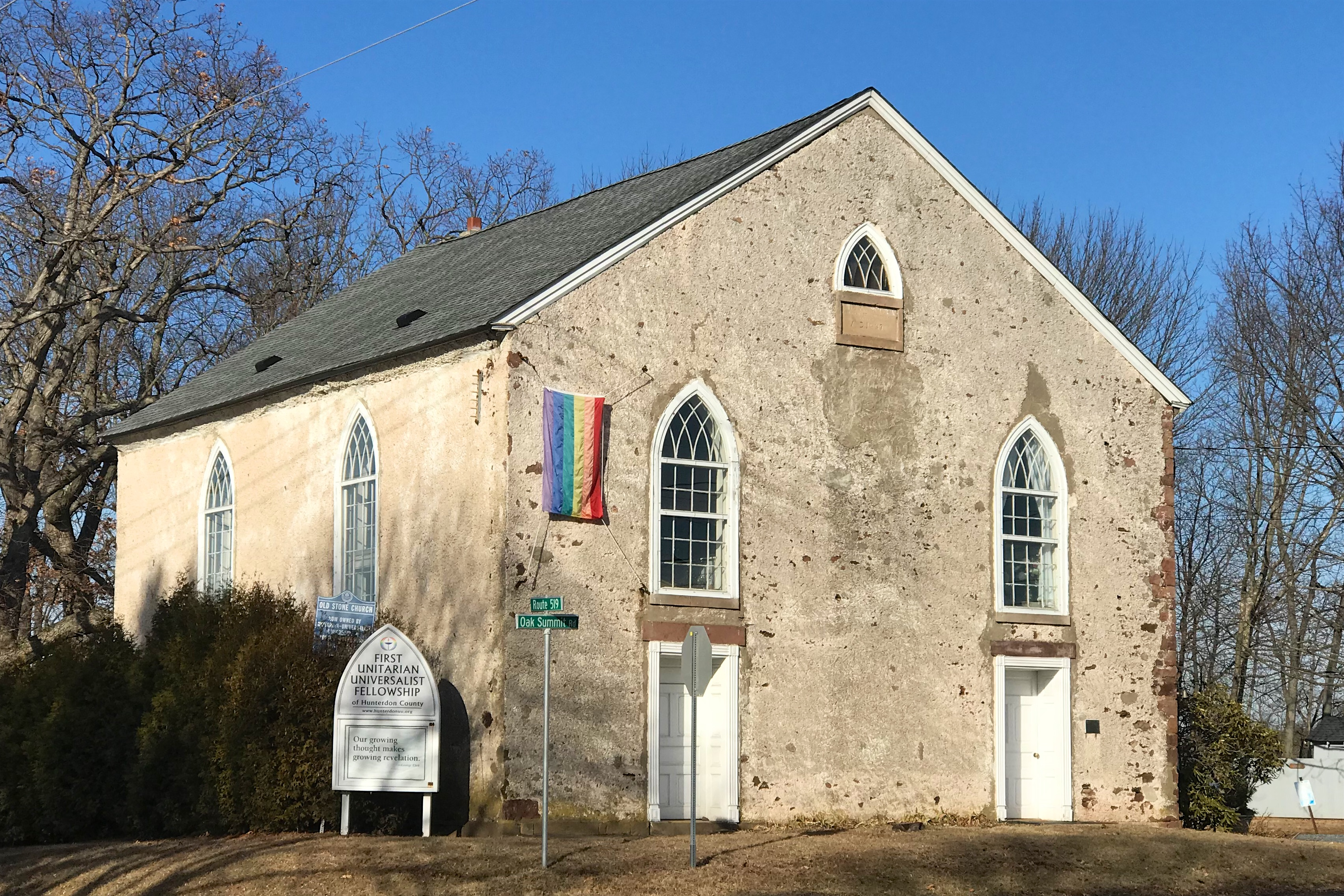
- Old Stone Church, 2018

- Location within Hunterdon County, New Jersey Location within New Jersey Location within the United States
- Location: Corner of Oak Summit Road and County Route 519; Kingwood Township, New Jersey
- Coordinates: 40°32′34″N 75°00′20″W
- Area: 0.7 acres (0.28 ha)
- Built: 1837
- NRHP reference No.: 100002053
- NJRHP No.: 5557

Significant dates
- Added to NRHP: January 25, 2018
- Designated NJRHP: December 6, 2017

The Old Stone Church is a historic sandstone church located in Kingwood Township in Hunterdon County, New Jersey, United States. It was built in 1837 and is now owned by the First Unitarian Universalist Fellowship of Hunterdon County. The church, described using its historic name, Old Stone Presbyterian Church in Kingwood, was added to the National Register of Historic Places on January 25, 2018 for its significance in architecture. The earlier church located here was a smaller stone building built in 1755, called the Old Stone Meetinghouse. The stones from this church were probably used to build the current one. The Kingwood congregation was established in 1728 and grew during the First Great Awakening, with Gilbert Tennent and George Whitefield preaching here in 1739.

The Oak Summit School, located next to the church, is a one-room schoolhouse that was established in 1849 and used until 1953. The building is not part of this NRHP listing.

== Gallery ==
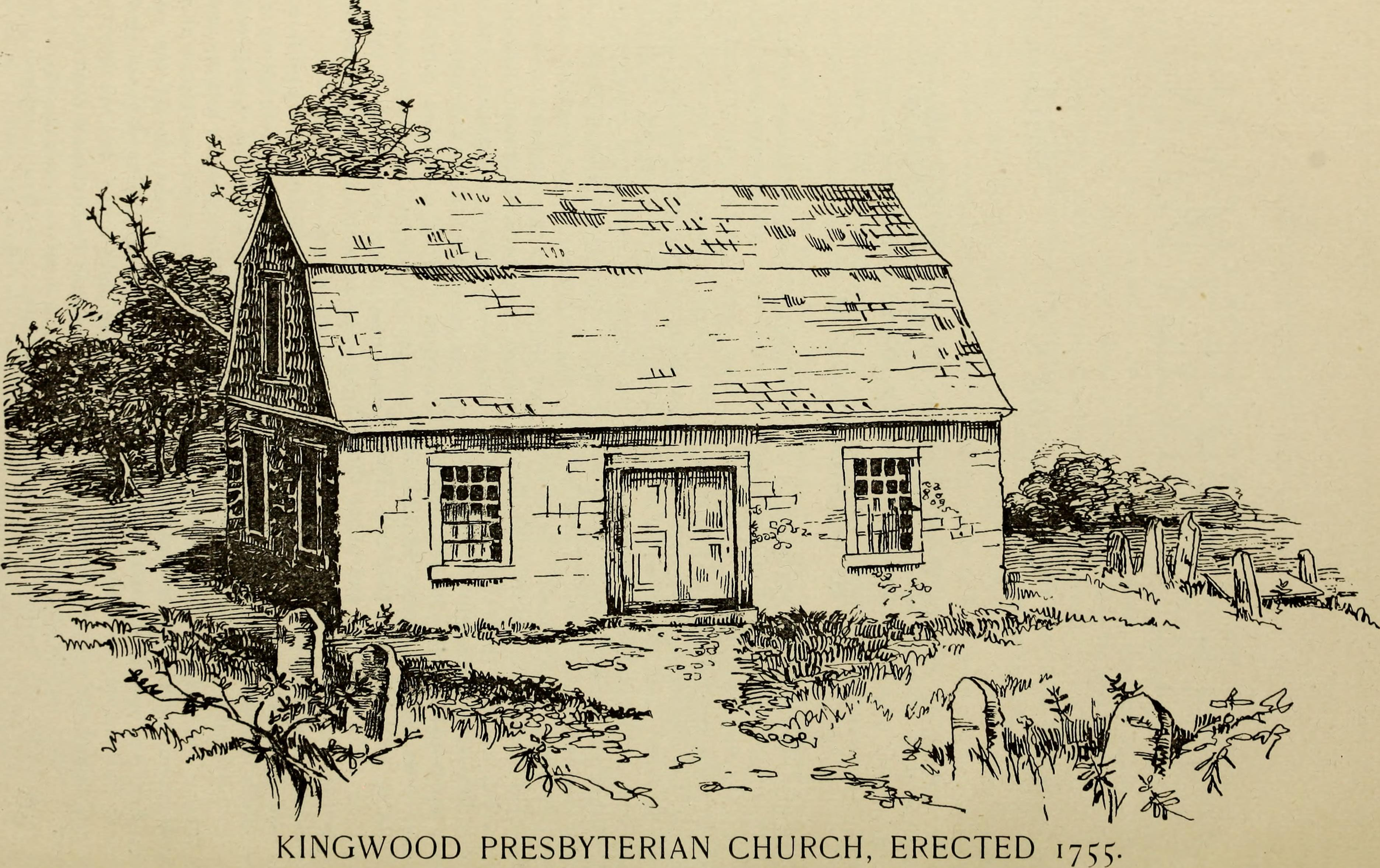
Kingwood Presbyterian Church, erected 1755

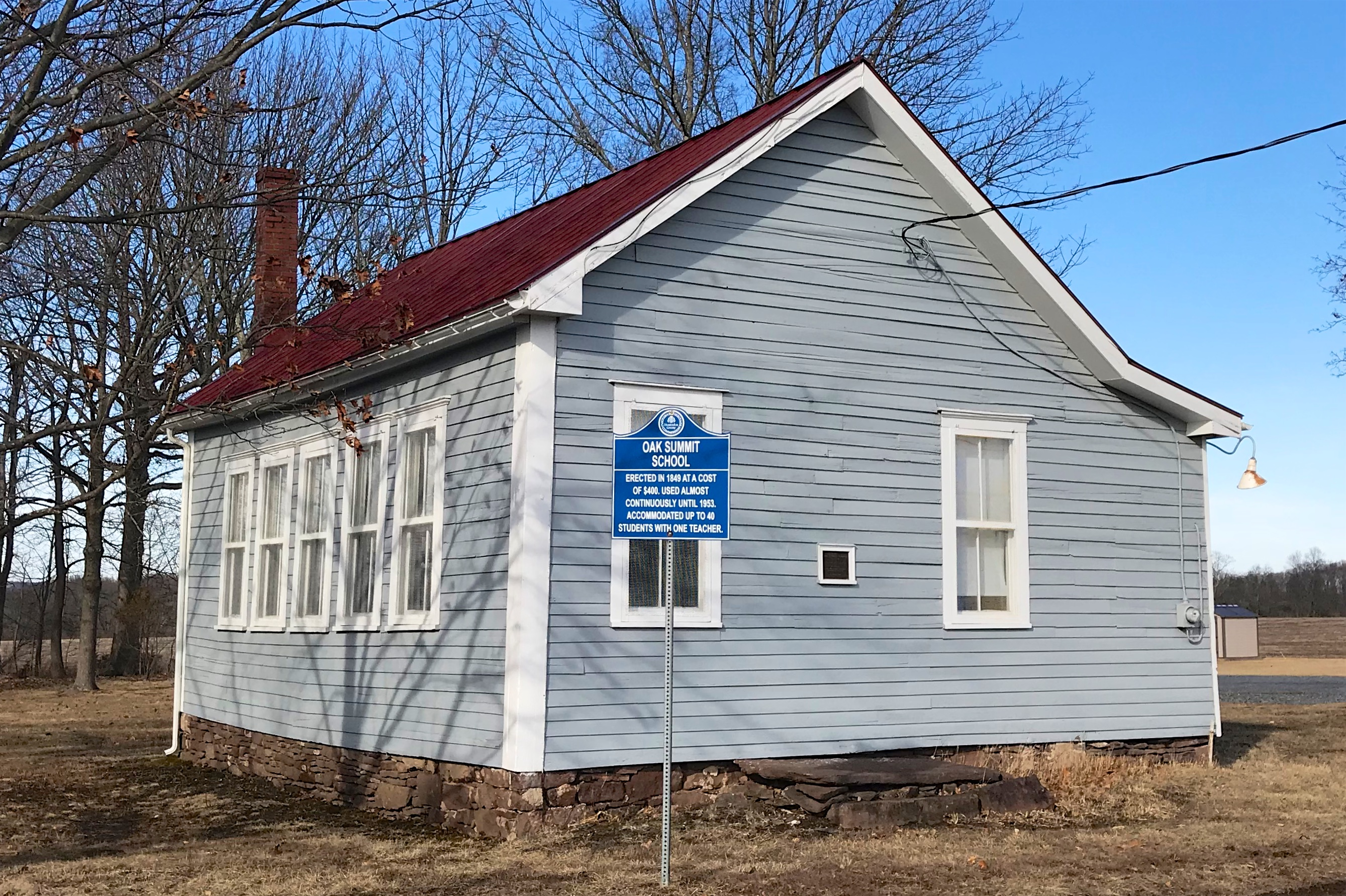
Oak Summit School

== Oak Summit Cemetery ==
Oak Summit Cemetery
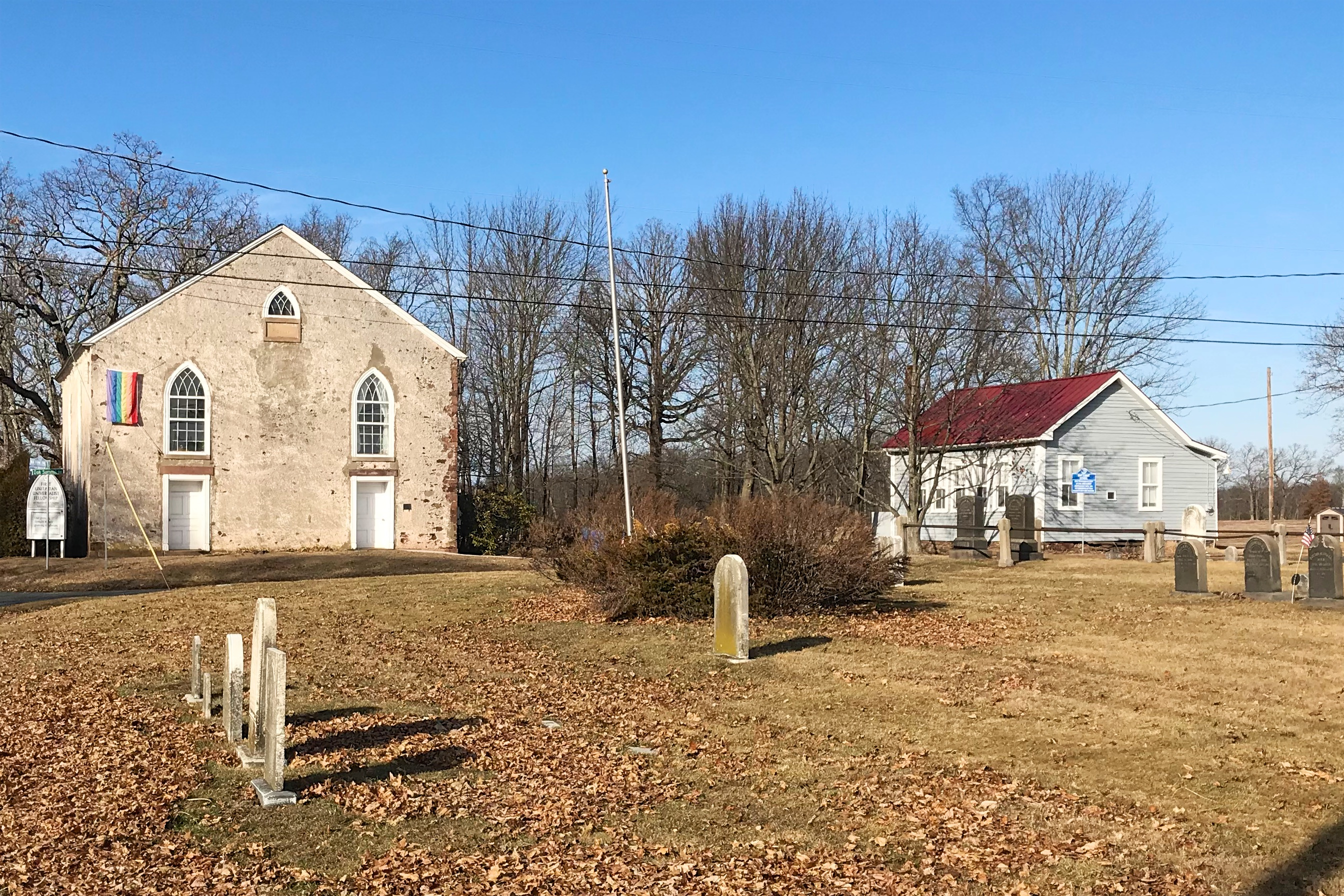
- Kingwood Presbyterian Church Cemetery, 2018
- Interactive map of Oak Summit Cemetery

Details
- Established: 1754
- Location: Oak Summit Road

The cemetery for the Presbyterian church was established on the south side of Oak Summit Road in 1754. It is not part of this NRHP listing.
