= Thatcher House (Kingwood Township, New Jersey) =

Historic house in New Jersey, United States

- U.S. National Register of Historic Places
- New Jersey Register of Historic Places
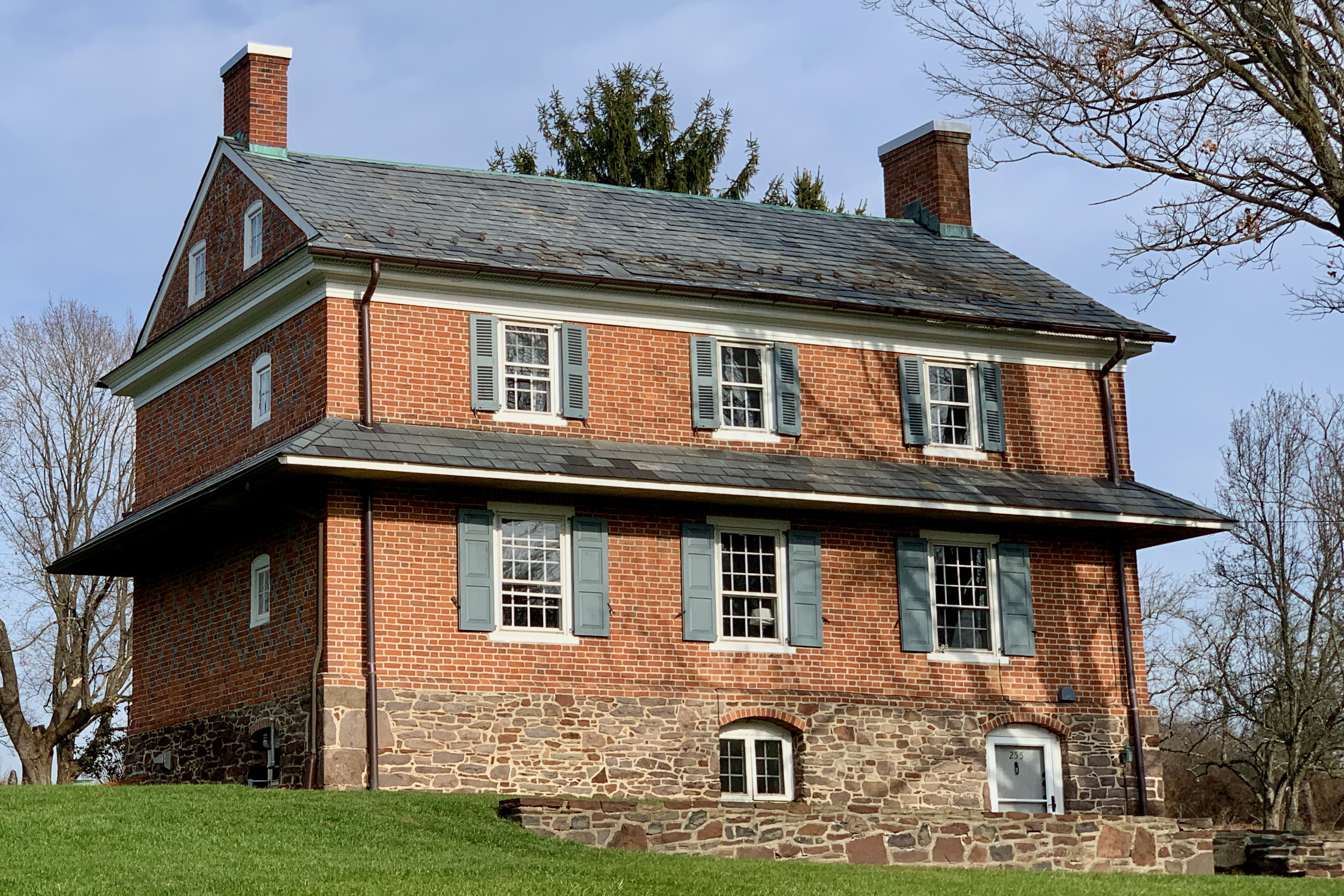

- Location within Hunterdon County, New Jersey Location within New Jersey Location within the United States
- Location: 255 Ridge Road, Kingwood Township, New Jersey
- Nearest city: Frenchtown, New Jersey
- Coordinates: 40°32′16″N 75°01′24″W
- Area: 3.8 acres (1.5 ha)
- Built: 1765
- MPS: Traditional Patterned Brickwork Buildings in New Jersey
- NRHP reference No.: 100005851
- NJRHP No.: 5796

Significant dates
- Added to NRHP: December 4, 2020
- Designated NJRHP: October 19, 2020

The Thatcher House is a historic patterned brick house located at 255 Ridge Road in Kingwood Township, about two miles from Frenchtown, in Hunterdon County, New Jersey, United States. It is named after Jeremiah Thatcher (d. 1790), a local farmer. Built in 1765, the house was added to the National Register of Historic Places on December 4, 2020, for its significance in architecture. It features patterned brickwork with complex diamonds. The house is part of the Traditional Patterned Brickwork Buildings in New Jersey Multiple Property Submission (MPS). It features a mix of Flemish bond and Flemish checker, with four different diamond designs.

== Gallery ==
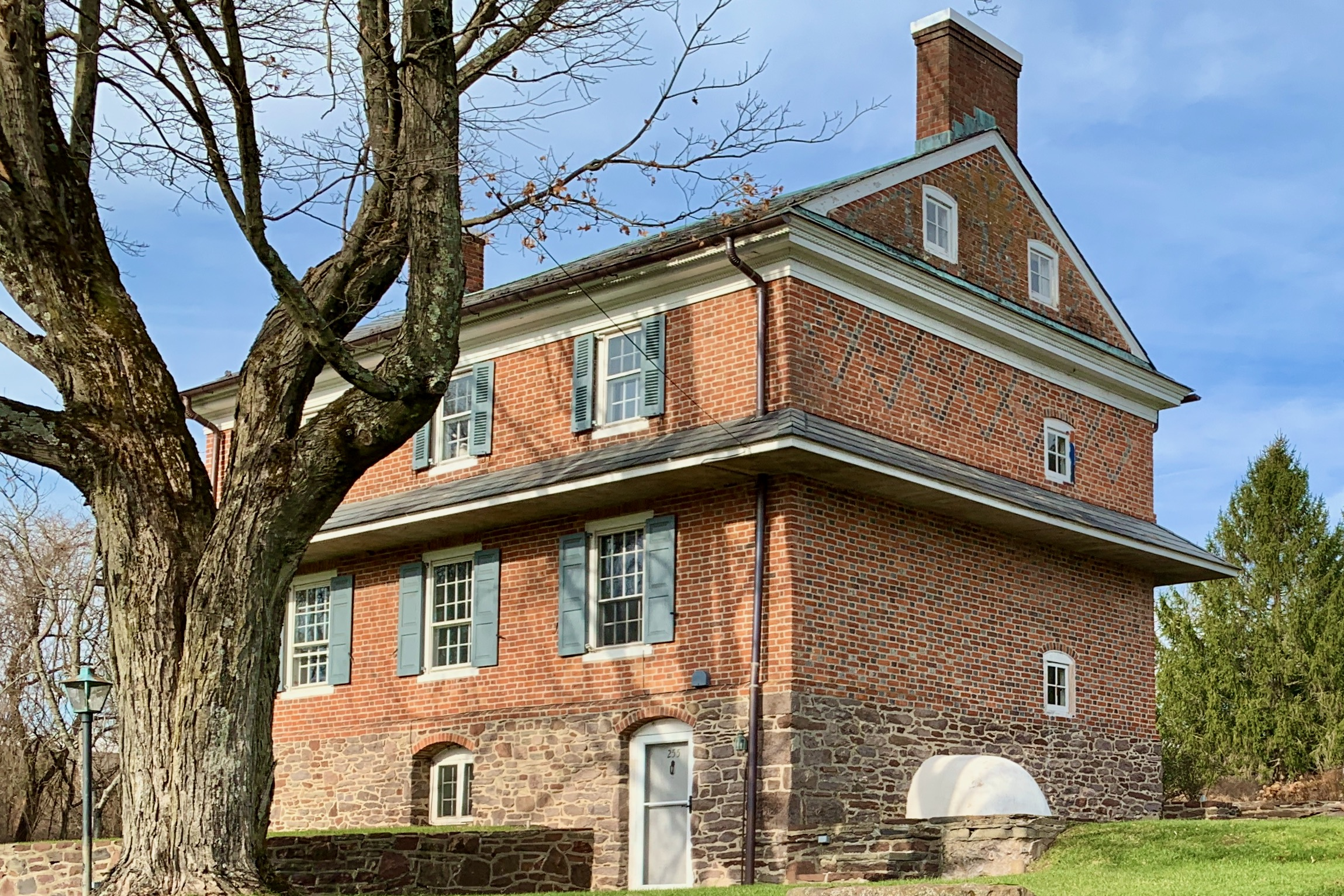
Patterned brickwork diamonds

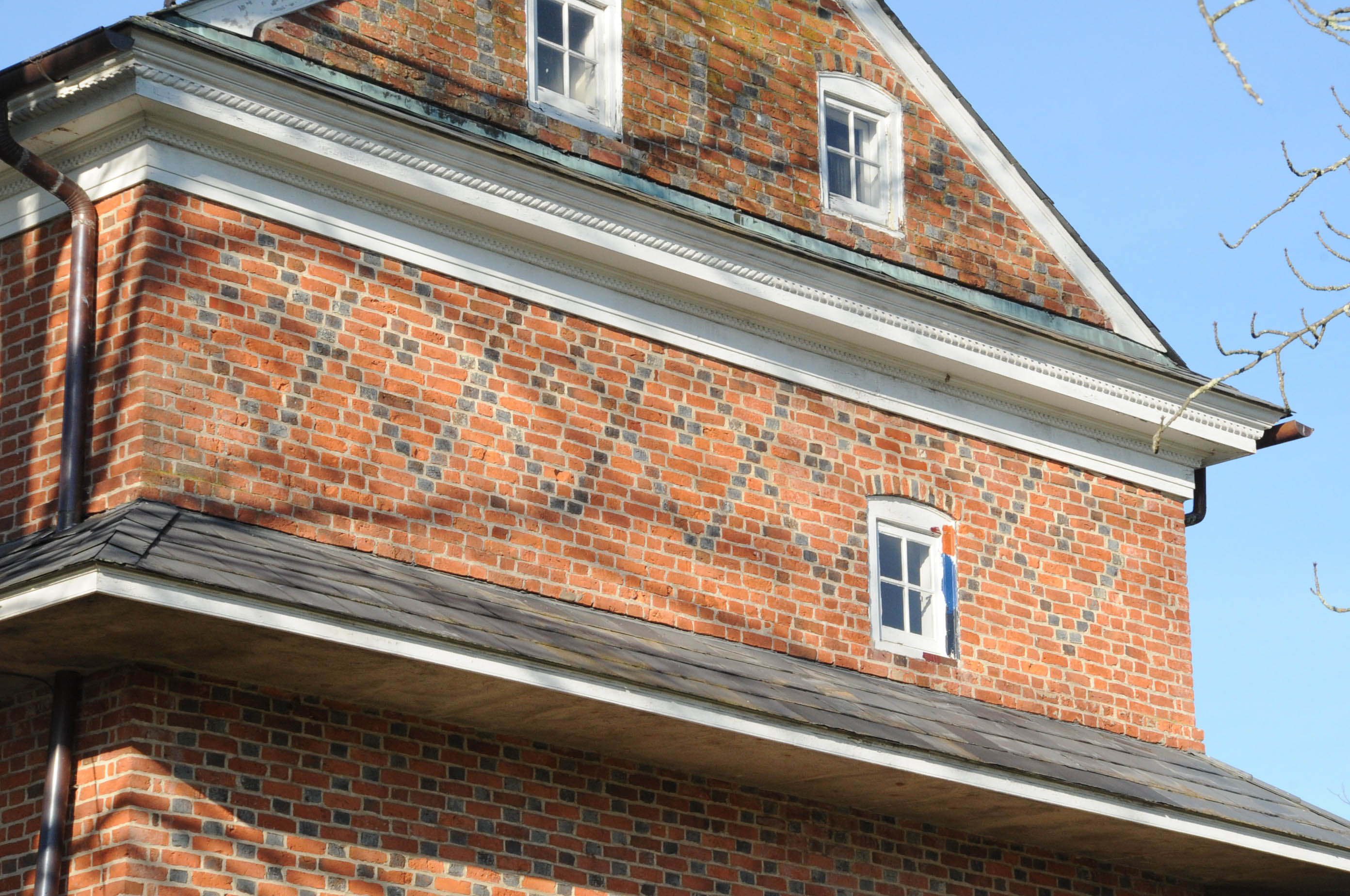
Detail of the brickwork

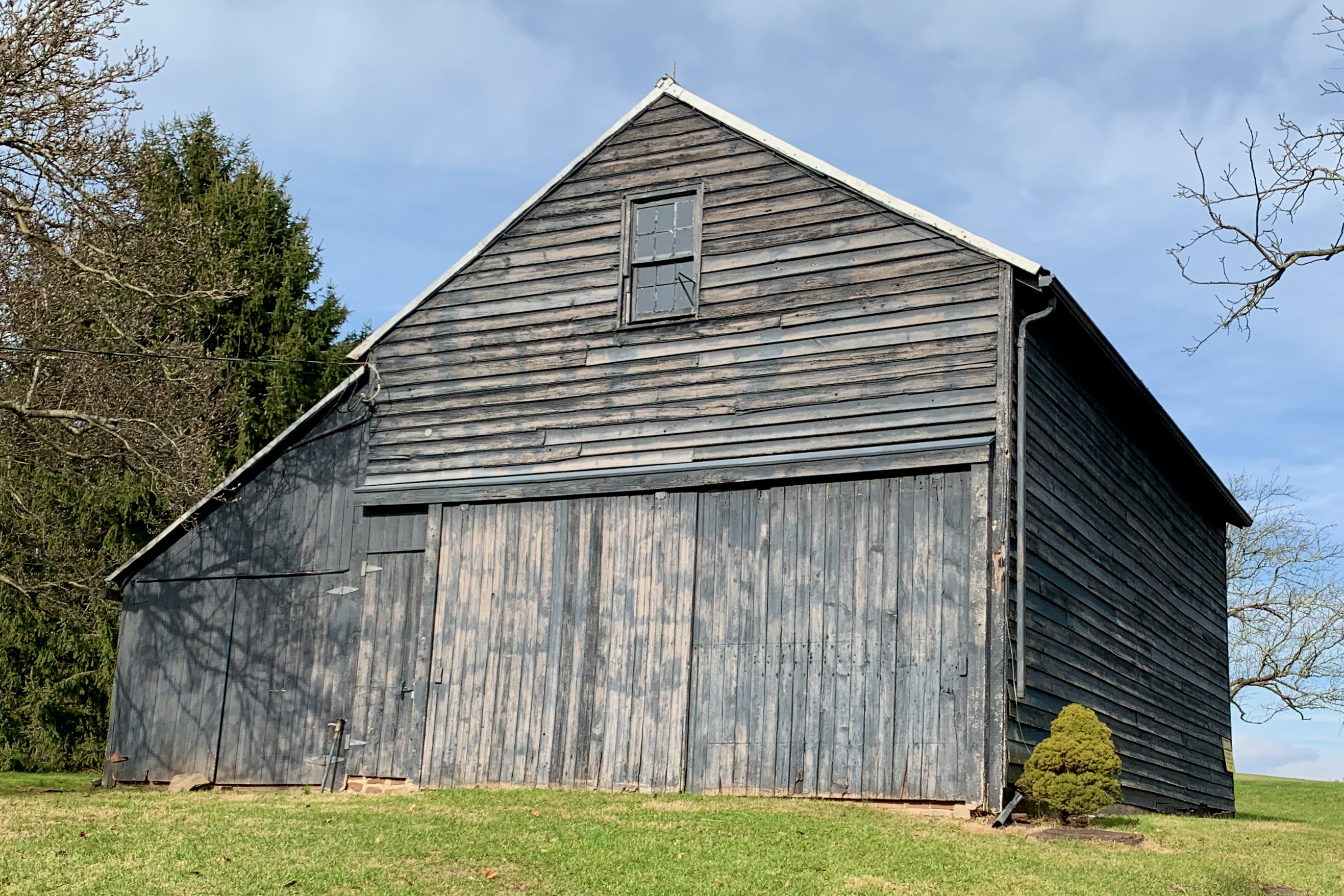
Wagon house (not contributing)

== See also ==
- National Register of Historic Places listings in Hunterdon County, New Jersey
- List of the oldest buildings in New Jersey
