= Barbertown, New Jersey =

Populated place in Hunterdon County, New Jersey, US

- Unincorporated community
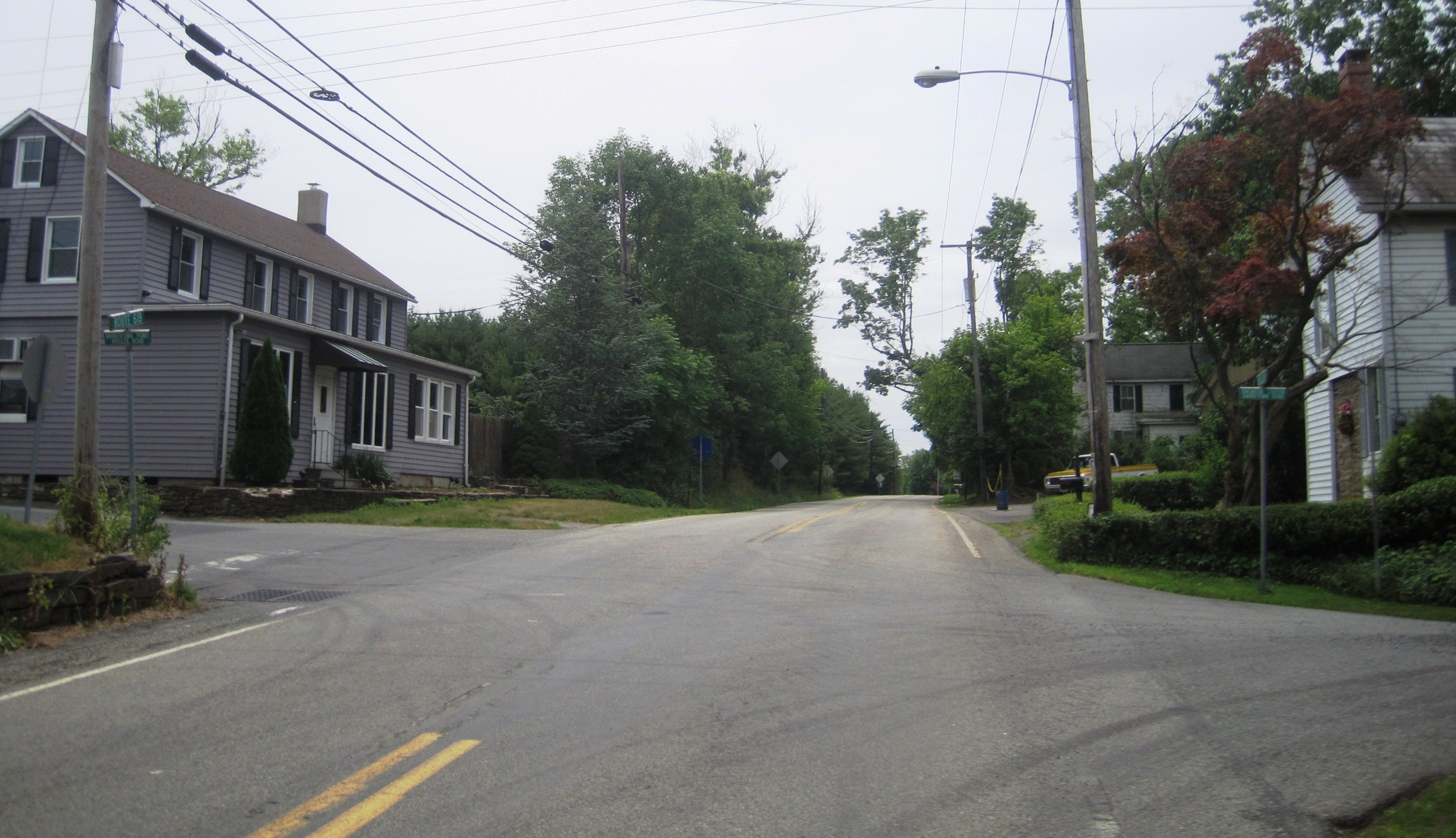
- Looking south along CR 519 in Barbertown

- Location of Barbertown in Hunterdon County Inset: Location of county within the state of New Jersey Barbertown, New Jersey (New Jersey) Barbertown, New Jersey (the United States)
- Coordinates: 40°29′07″N 75°01′38″W
- Country: United States
- State: New Jersey
- County: Hunterdon
- Township: Kingwood
- Elevation: 463 ft (141 m)
- GNIS feature ID: 874487

Barbertown is an unincorporated community located within Kingwood Township in Hunterdon County, in the U.S. state of New Jersey.

== History ==
Isaac Barber opened a tavern in the settlement in 1823. The tavern sign was a new moon.

In 1881, it was noted that Barbertown had a blacksmith shop, two stores, six dwellings, and a population of 90.
