= Frenchtown Solar =

- Country: United States
- Location: Kingwood Township, New Jersey
- Coordinates: 40°31′N 75°01′W
- Status: Operational
- Construction began: 2011
- Commission date: 2011, 2012, 2013

Solar farm
- Type: Flat-panel PV
- Site area: 110 acres (44.5 ha)

Power generation
- Units operational: 68,500
- Nameplate capacity: 16.8 MW

Frenchtown Solar is a group of three photvoltaic arrays, or solar farms, in Kingwood Township, about 3 miles east of namesake Frenchtown, Hunterdon County, New Jersey, United States. Two arrays are located just outside the village of Baptistown on New Jersey Route 12 The third and largest is to the south, off County Route 519.

The power station was developed in conjunction with Con Ed Development. It interconnects to Jersey Central Power and Light, which in turn in is part of the PJM Interconnection. Flemington Solar is a similar project located in adjacent Raritan Township.

| Name | Coordinates | Year operational | Capacity | Size |
|---|---|---|---|---|
| Frenchtown Solar 1 | 40.522°N 75.012°W | 2012 | 3.4 megawatts | 15 acres (6.1 ha); 12,400 panels |
| Frenchtown Solar 2 | 40.515°N 74.977°W | 2011 | 3.4 megawatts | 15 acres (6.1 ha); 12,400 panels |
| Frenchtown Solar 3 | 40.483°N 75.016°W | 2013 | 10.0 megawatts | 50 acres (20.2 ha); 33,300 panels |

== See also ==
- Solar power in New Jersey
- List of power stations in New Jersey
