= Kingwood Township, New Jersey =

Township in Hunterdon County, New Jersey, US

- Township
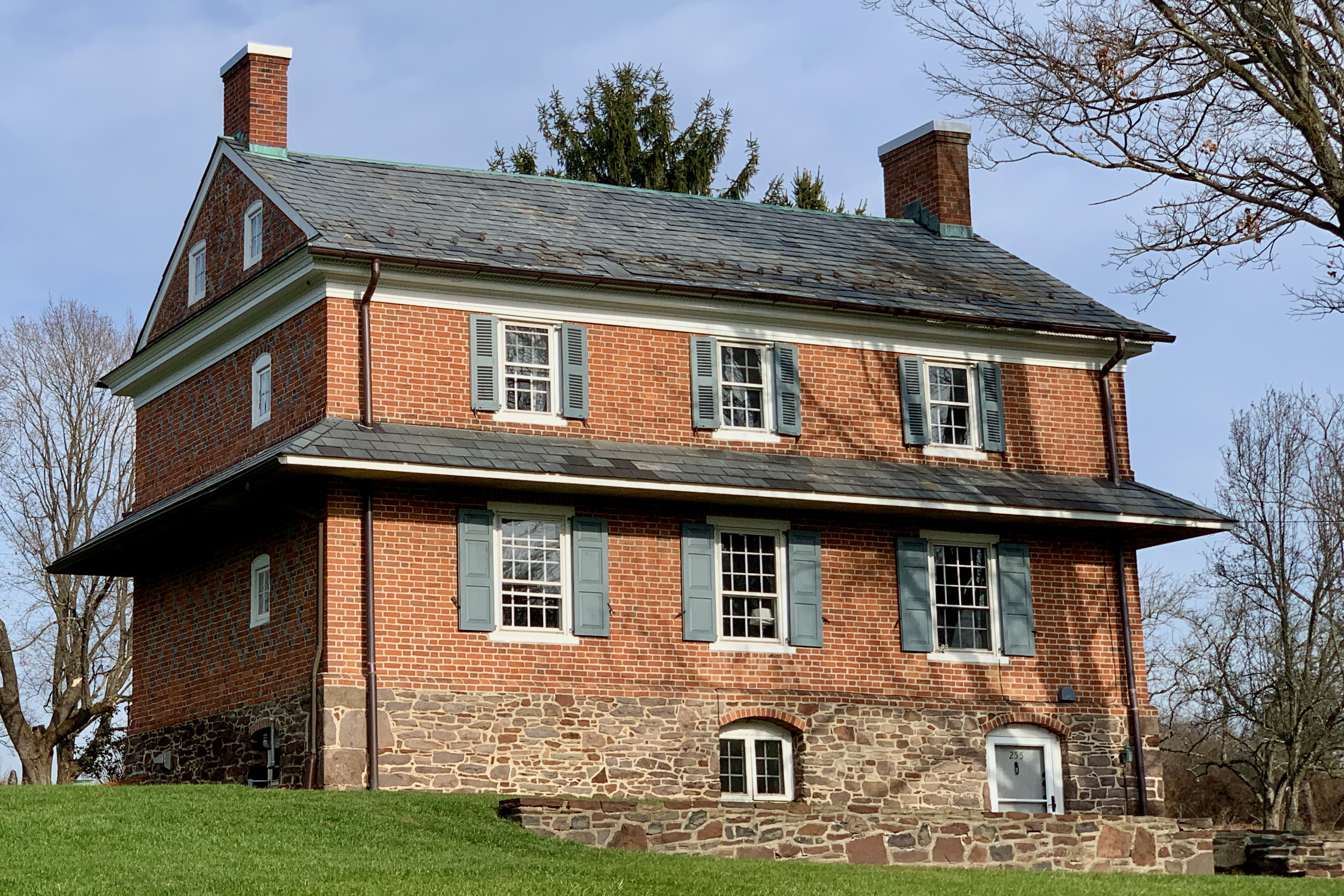
- Thatcher House, listed on the National Register of Historic Places

- Seal

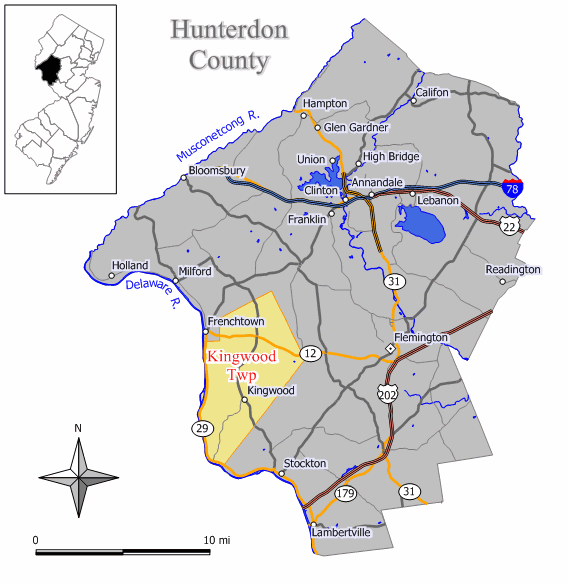
- Location of Kingwood Township in Hunterdon County highlighted in yellow (right). Inset map: Location of Hunterdon County in New Jersey highlighted in black (left).

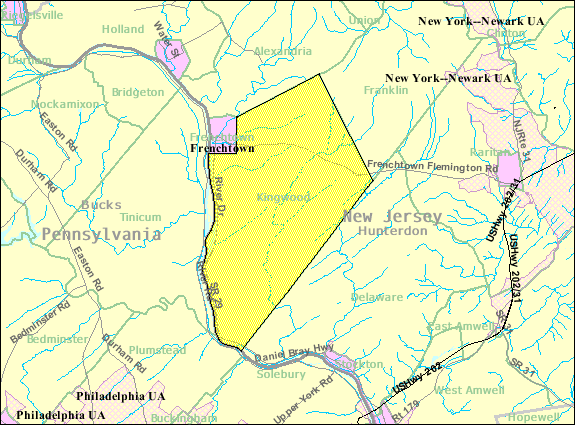
- Census Bureau map of Kingwood Township, New Jersey

- Location in Hunterdon County Location in New Jersey Location in the United States
- Coordinates: 40.494704°N 75.019461°W
- Country: United States
- State: New Jersey
- County: Hunterdon
- Established: 1746
- Incorporated: February 21, 1798

Government
  - Type: Township
  - Body: Township Committee
  - Mayor: Paymon Jelvani (R, term ends December 31, 2026)
  - Administrator / Municipal clerk: Jeffrey Jotz

Area
  - Total: 35.61 sq mi (92.24 km^{2})
  - Land: 35.00 sq mi (90.66 km^{2})
  - Water: 0.61 sq mi (1.58 km^{2}) 1.71%
  - Rank: 67th of 565 in state 4th of 26 in county
- Elevation: 469 ft (143 m)

Population (2020)
  - Total: 3,802
  - Estimate (2023): 3,843
  - Rank: 420th of 565 in state 13th of 26 in county
  - Density: 108.6/sq mi (41.9/km^{2})
  - Rank: 535th of 565 in state 26th of 26 in county
- Time zone: UTC−05:00 (Eastern (EST))
  - Summer (DST): UTC−04:00 (Eastern (EDT))
- ZIP Code: 08803 – Baptistown
- Area code: 908
- FIPS code: 3401937065
- GNIS feature ID: 0882183
- Website: www.kingwoodtownship.gov

Kingwood Township is a township in Hunterdon County, in the U.S. state of New Jersey, located on the Hunterdon Plateau. As of the 2020 United States census, the township's population was 3,802, a decrease of 43 (−1.1%) from the 2010 census count of 3,845, which in turn reflected an increase of 63 (+1.7%) from the 3,782 counted in the 2000 census.

== History ==
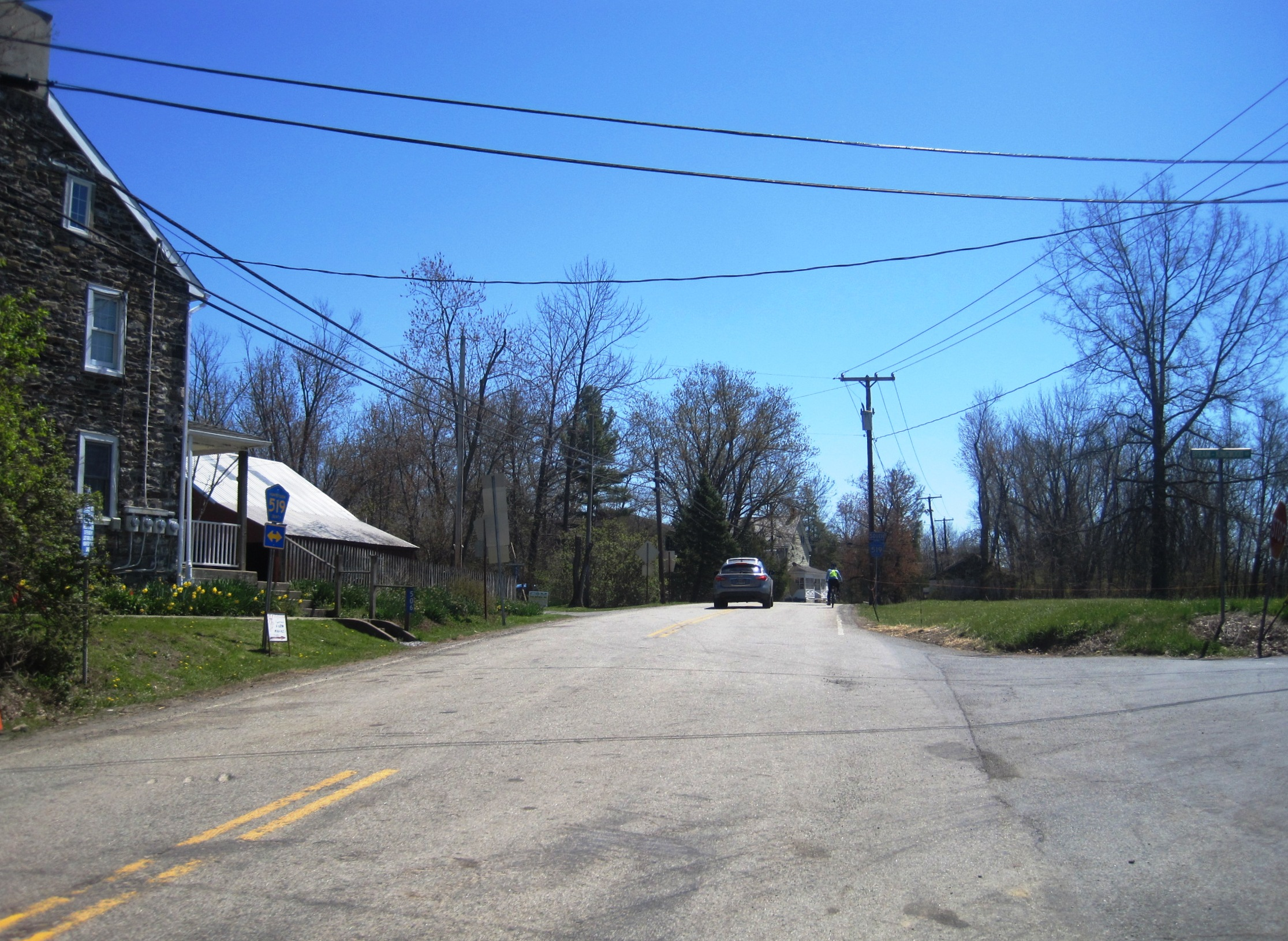
Community of Kingwood located near the center of the township

Kingwood Township is one of the westernmost townships of Hunterdon County. Kingwood was originally established around 1746 when it was created from Bethlehem Township, though the exact details are uncertain. Kingwood was incorporated by Act of the New Jersey Legislature on February 21, 1798, as one of New Jersey's initial group of 104 townships. Portions of the township were taken to form Franklin Township on April 7, 1845. Frenchtown borough acquired portions of the township in 1876.

Kingwood Township was the home of Daniel Bray, the local captain who rounded up the boats for George Washington's crossing of the Delaware River during the Revolutionary War. The portion of Route 29 that runs through the township along its western edge is named for him.

In late 1981, Dick Siano became the first Libertarian Party candidate to win a partisan election outside of Alaska by winning a committee seat in the township. In the November election, he and the Democratic tied in the general election placing the incumbent Republican mayor in third place. Siano won the runoff election held on December 22.

== Geography ==
According to the United States Census Bureau, the township had a total area of 35.62 square miles (92.24 km^{2}), including 35.01 square miles (90.66 km^{2}) of land and 0.61 square miles (1.58 km^{2}) of water (1.71%).

The township borders the municipalities of Alexandria Township, Delaware Township, Franklin Township and Frenchtown in Hunterdon County; and the communities of Plumstead Township and Tinicum Township in Bucks County, across the Delaware River in Pennsylvania. Most of the township lies on the Hunterdon Plateau, a geologic plateau averaging 300–500 feet (90–150 m) in elevation though approaching the Delaware River, the elevation drops sharply to about 100 feet (30 m) at the banks of the river. Exposed rock can be seen on portions of Route 29 in the township between the River and the plateau.

Unincorporated communities, localities and place names located partially or completely within the township include Baptistown, Barbertown, Byram, Idell, Milltown, Point Breeze, Treasure Island, Tumble and Tumble Falls.

Frenchtown Solar is a group of three photovoltaic arrays owned by Consolidated Edison that forms one of the largest solar farms in the state, covering 110 acres (44.5 ha) with a total of 68,500 solar panels and a 20.1 megawatt generating capacity. Two arrays are located just outside Baptistown on Route 12. The third and largest is to the south off County Route 519.

== Demographics ==
Historical population
Census	Pop.	Note	%±
1790	2,446		—
1810	2,606		—
1820	2,786		6.9%
1830	2,898		4.0%
1840	2,947		1.7%
1850	1,799	*	−39.0%
1860	2,148		19.4%
1870	1,942		−9.6%
1880	1,694		−12.8%
1890	1,424		−15.9%
1900	1,304		−8.4%
1910	1,265		−3.0%
1920	1,160		−8.3%
1930	1,218		5.0%
1940	1,253		2.9%
1950	1,320		5.3%
1960	1,841		39.5%
1970	2,294		24.6%
1980	2,772		20.8%
1990	3,325		19.9%
2000	3,782		13.7%
2010	3,845		1.7%
2020	3,802		−1.1%
2023 (est.)	3,843		1.1%
Population sources: 1790–1920 1840; 1850–1870 1850 1870; 1880–1890 1890–1910; 1910–1930 1940–2000; 2000 2010 2020 * = Lost territory in previous decade.

=== 2010 census ===
The 2010 United States census counted 3,845 people, 1,446 households, and 1,103 families in the township. The population density was 109.4 inhabitants per square mile (42.2/km^{2}). There were 1,569 housing units at an average density of 44.6 per square mile (17.2/km^{2}). The racial makeup was 96.51% (3,711) White, 0.65% (25) Black or African American, 0.03% (1) Native American, 1.09% (42) Asian, 0.00% (0) Pacific Islander, 0.52% (20) from other races, and 1.20% (46) from two or more races. Hispanic or Latino of any race were 2.39% (92) of the population.

Of the 1,446 households, 32.2% had children under the age of 18; 64.2% were married couples living together; 8.0% had a female householder with no husband present and 23.7% were non-families. Of all households, 18.1% were made up of individuals and 6.5% had someone living alone who was 65 years of age or older. The average household size was 2.66 and the average family size was 3.04.

23.1% of the population were under the age of 18, 6.0% from 18 to 24, 20.8% from 25 to 44, 37.3% from 45 to 64, and 12.9% who were 65 years of age or older. The median age was 45.1 years. For every 100 females, the population had 103.0 males. For every 100 females ages 18 and older there were 99.1 males.

The Census Bureau's 2006–2010 American Community Survey showed that (in 2010 inflation-adjusted dollars) median household income was $94,951 (with a margin of error of +/− $8,656) and the median family income was $101,722 (+/− $3,508). Males had a median income of $62,636 (+/− $11,644) versus $39,704 (+/− $5,890) for females. The per capita income for the borough was $38,977 (+/− $4,174). About 2.7% of families and 3.2% of the population were below the poverty line, including 6.1% of those under age 18 and none of those age 65 or over.

=== 2000 census ===
As of the 2000 United States census there were 3,782 people, 1,340 households, and 1,042 families residing in the township. The population density was 107.4 inhabitants per square mile (41.5/km^{2}). There were 1,422 housing units at an average density of 40.4 per square mile (15.6/km^{2}). The racial makeup of the township was 97.62% White, 0.61% African American, 0.08% Native American, 0.77% Asian, 0.19% from other races, and 0.74% from two or more races. Hispanic or Latino of any race were 1.85% of the population.

There were 1,340 households, out of which 38.9% had children under the age of 18 living with them, 68.9% were married couples living together, 6.0% had a female householder with no husband present, and 22.2% were non-families. 17.6% of all households were made up of individuals, and 6.9% had someone living alone who was 65 years of age or older. The average household size was 2.82 and the average family size was 3.21.

In the township the population was spread out, with 27.3% under the age of 18, 4.8% from 18 to 24, 31.6% from 25 to 44, 25.7% from 45 to 64, and 10.5% who were 65 years of age or older. The median age was 39 years. For every 100 females, there were 102.0 males. For every 100 females age 18 and over, there were 99.3 males.

The median income for a household in the township was $71,551, and the median income for a family was $81,642. Males had a median income of $54,107 versus $31,326 for females. The per capita income for the township was $30,219. About 2.3% of families and 2.9% of the population were below the poverty line, including 4.1% of those under age 18 and none of those age 65 or over.

== Government ==
=== Local government ===
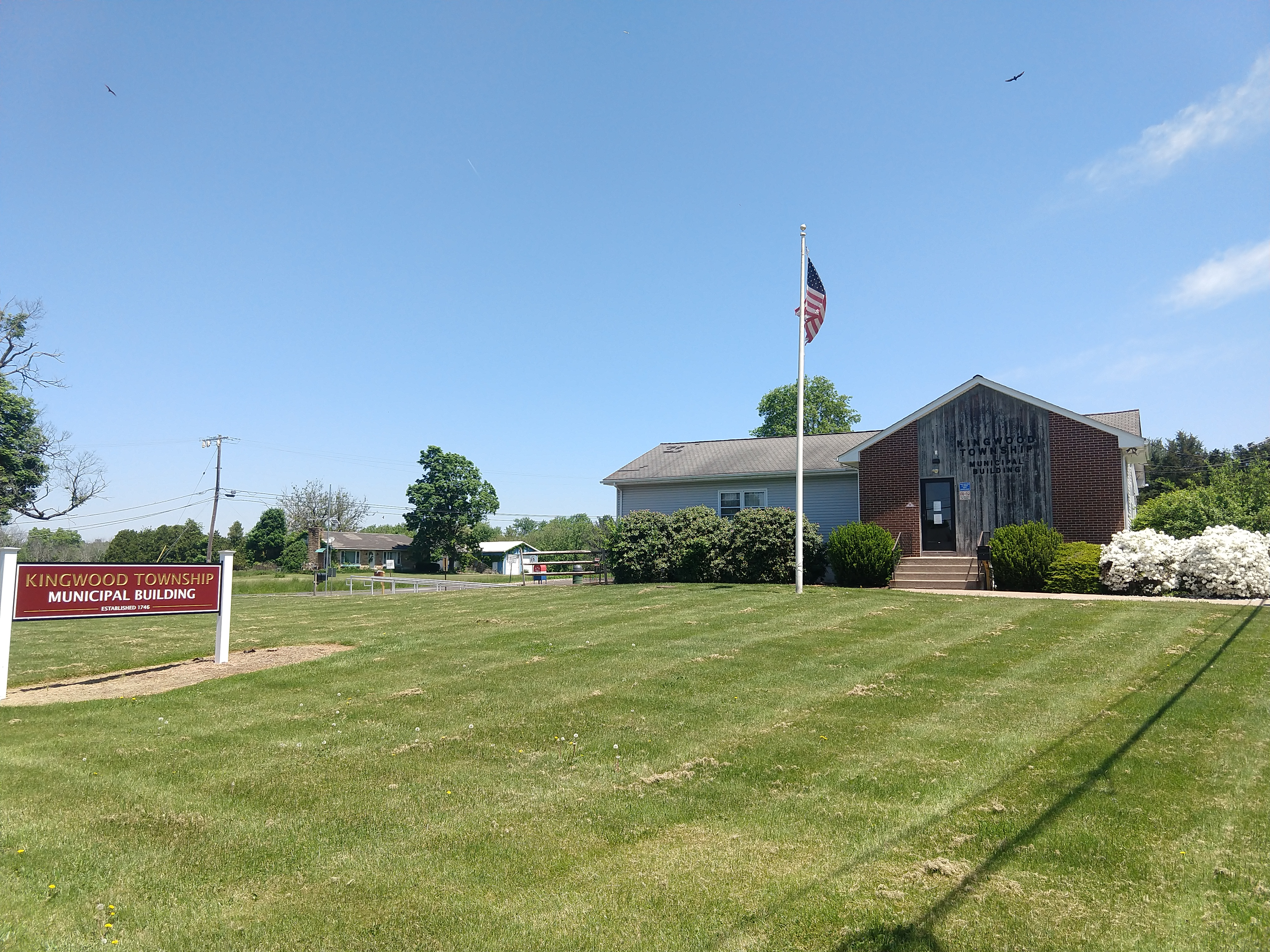
Kingwood Township Municipal Building

Kingwood Township operates under the Township form of New Jersey municipal government, one of 141 municipalities (of the 564) statewide that use this form. The Township Committee is comprised of three members, who are elected directly by the voters at-large in partisan elections to serve three-year terms of office on a staggered basis, with one seat coming up for election each year as part of the November general election in a three-year cycle. The Mayor is elected by the Committee from among its members and serves a one-year term, as does the Deputy Mayor. The Mayor serves as the Chairperson of the Committee and votes as an equal member, but has no other special powers.

As of 2026, members of the Kingwood Township Committee are Mayor Paymon Jelvani (R, term on committee ends December 31, 2026; term as mayor ends 2026), Deputy Mayor Shana Taylor (R, term on committee ends 2027) and Frank Floyd (R, term on committee ends December 31, 2028).

=== Federal, state and county representation ===
Kingwood Township is located in the 7th Congressional District and is part of New Jersey's 15th state legislative district.

For the 119th United States Congress, New Jersey's 7th congressional district is represented by Thomas Kean Jr. (R, Westfield). New Jersey is represented in the United States Senate by Democrats Cory Booker (Newark, term ends 2027) and Andy Kim (Moorestown, term ends 2031).

For the 2026–2027 session, the 15th legislative district of the New Jersey Legislature is represented in the State Senate by Shirley Turner (D, Lawrence Township) and in the General Assembly by Verlina Reynolds-Jackson (D, Trenton) and Anthony Verrelli (D, Hopewell Township).

Hunterdon County is governed by a Board of County Commissioners comprised of five members who are elected at-large on a partisan basis to serve three-year terms of office on a staggered basis, with either one or two seats up for election each year as part of the November general election. At an annual reorganization meeting held each January, the commissioners select one member to serve as the board's Director and another to serve as Deputy Director, each for a one-year term. As of 2025, Hunterdon County's Commissioners are Director John E. Lanza (R; Raritan Township, 2025), Deputy Director Shaun C. Van Doren (R; Tewksbury Township, 2026), Jeff Kuhl (R; Raritan Township, 2027), Zachary T. Rich (R; West Amwell Township, 2025) and Susan Soloway (R; Franklin Township, 2027).

Constitutional officers elected on a countywide basis are Clerk Mary H. Melfi (R; Flemington, 2026), Sheriff Fredrick W. Brown (R; Alexandria Township, 2025) and Surrogate Heidi Rohrbach (R; Lebanon Township, 2028).

=== Politics ===
Gubernatorial election results for Kingwood Township
Year	Republican		Democratic		Third party(ies)	
Year	No.	%	No.	%	No.	%
2025	1,320	62.83%	771	36.70%	10	0.48%
2021	1,222	72.14%	451	26.62%	21	1.24%
2017	875	65.74%	424	31.86%	32	2.40%
2013	1,006	77.86%	250	19.35%	36	2.79%
2009	1,108	71.07%	330	21.17%	121	7.76%
2005	848	64.63%	376	28.66%	88	6.71%

United States presidential election results for Kingwood Township
Year	Republican		Democratic		Third party(ies)	
Year	No.	%	No.	%	No.	%
2024	1,630	64.00%	882	34.63%	35	1.37%
2020	1,614	62.61%	920	35.69%	44	1.71%
2016	1,390	63.70%	688	31.53%	104	4.77%
2012	1,282	62.54%	741	36.15%	27	1.32%
2008	1,248	58.26%	863	40.29%	31	1.45%
2004	1,281	61.76%	762	36.74%	31	1.49%

In the 2013 gubernatorial election, Republican Chris Christie received 77.9% of the vote (1,006 cast), ahead of Democrat Barbara Buono with 19.3% (250 votes), and other candidates with 2.8% (36 votes), among the 1,313 ballots cast by the township's 2,751 registered voters (21 ballots were spoiled), for a turnout of 47.7%.

United States Senate election results for Kingwood Township1
Year	Republican		Democratic		Third party(ies)	
Year	No.	%	No.	%	No.	%
2024	1,522	62.69%	847	34.88%	59	2.43%
2018	1,218	64.51%	592	31.36%	78	4.13%
2012	1,176	61.67%	673	35.29%	58	3.04%
2006	788	60.99%	443	34.29%	61	4.72%

United States Senate election results for Kingwood Township2
Year	Republican		Democratic		Third party(ies)	
Year	No.	%	No.	%	No.	%
2020	1,604	63.70%	845	33.56%	69	2.74%
2014	638	64.19%	332	33.40%	24	2.41%
2013	590	69.49%	253	29.80%	6	0.71%
2008	1,303	64.76%	637	31.66%	72	3.58%

== Education ==
The Kingwood Township School District serves public school students ranging from pre-kindergarten through eighth grade at Kingwood Township School. As of the 2022–23 school year, the district, comprised of one school, had an enrollment of 324 students and 36.2 classroom teachers (on an FTE basis), for a student–teacher ratio of 9.0:1.

Students in public school for ninth through twelfth grades attend Delaware Valley Regional High School, together with students from Alexandria Township, Frenchtown, Holland Township and Milford borough. As of the 2022–23 school year, the high school had an enrollment of 722 students and 59.9 classroom teachers (on an FTE basis), for a student–teacher ratio of 12.1:1. Seats on the high school district's nine-member board of education are allocated based on the population of the constituent municipalities, with two seats assigned to Kingwood Township.

Eighth grade students from all of Hunterdon County are eligible to apply to attend the high school programs offered by the Hunterdon County Vocational School District, a county-wide vocational school district that offers career and technical education at its campuses in Raritan Township and at programs sited at local high schools, with no tuition charged to students for attendance.

== Transportation ==
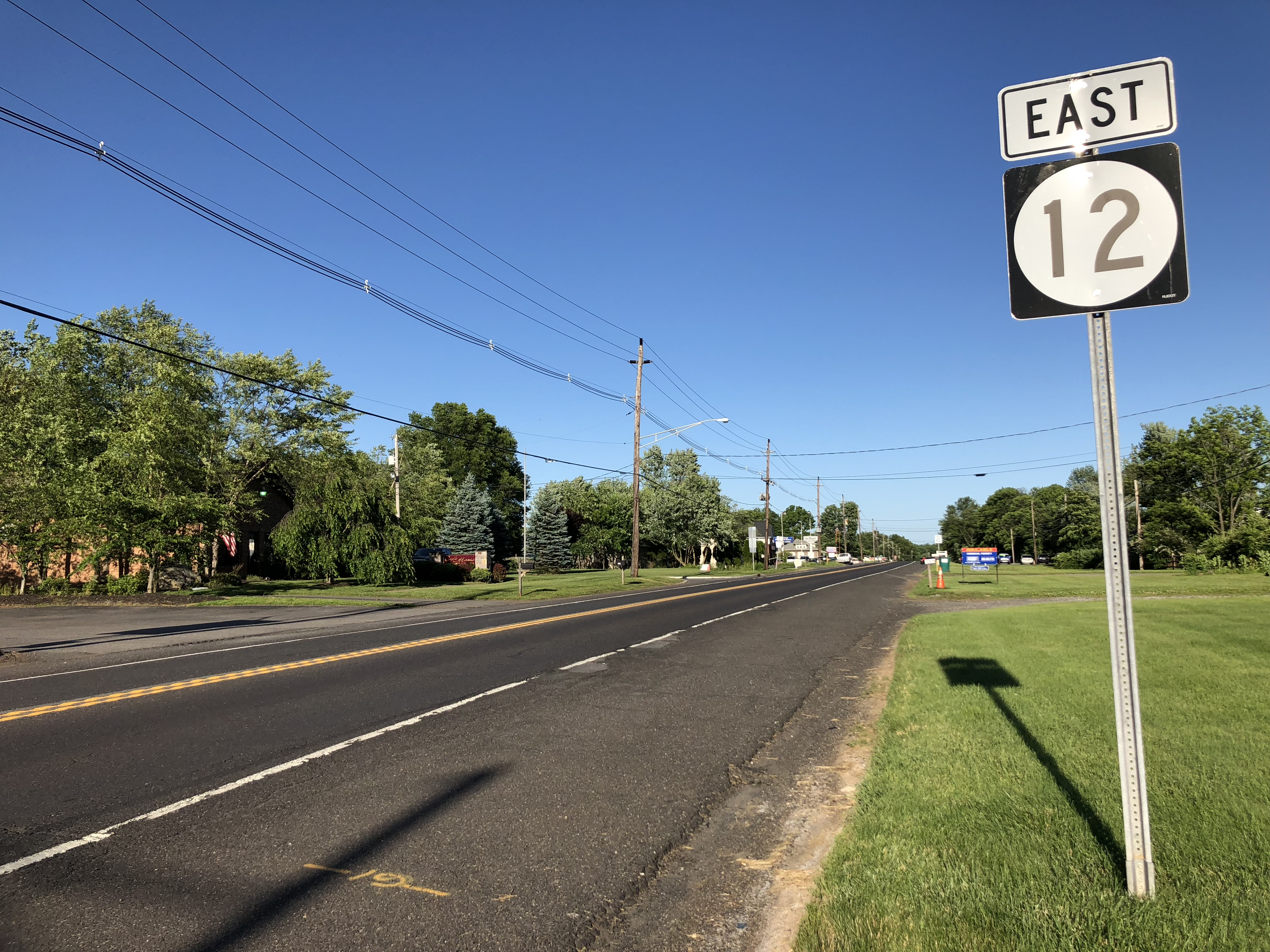
Route 12 eastbound in Kingwood Township

As of May 2010, the township had a total of 80.44 miles (129.46 km) of roadways, of which 55.02 miles (88.55 km) were maintained by the municipality, 12.54 miles (20.18 km) by Hunterdon County and 12.88 miles (20.73 km) by the New Jersey Department of Transportation.

The two state routes that pass through are Route 12 and Route 29. The only major county road that goes through is County Route 519.

No limited access roads traverse Kingwood; the closest one is Interstate 78 in neighboring Franklin Township.

== Points of interest ==
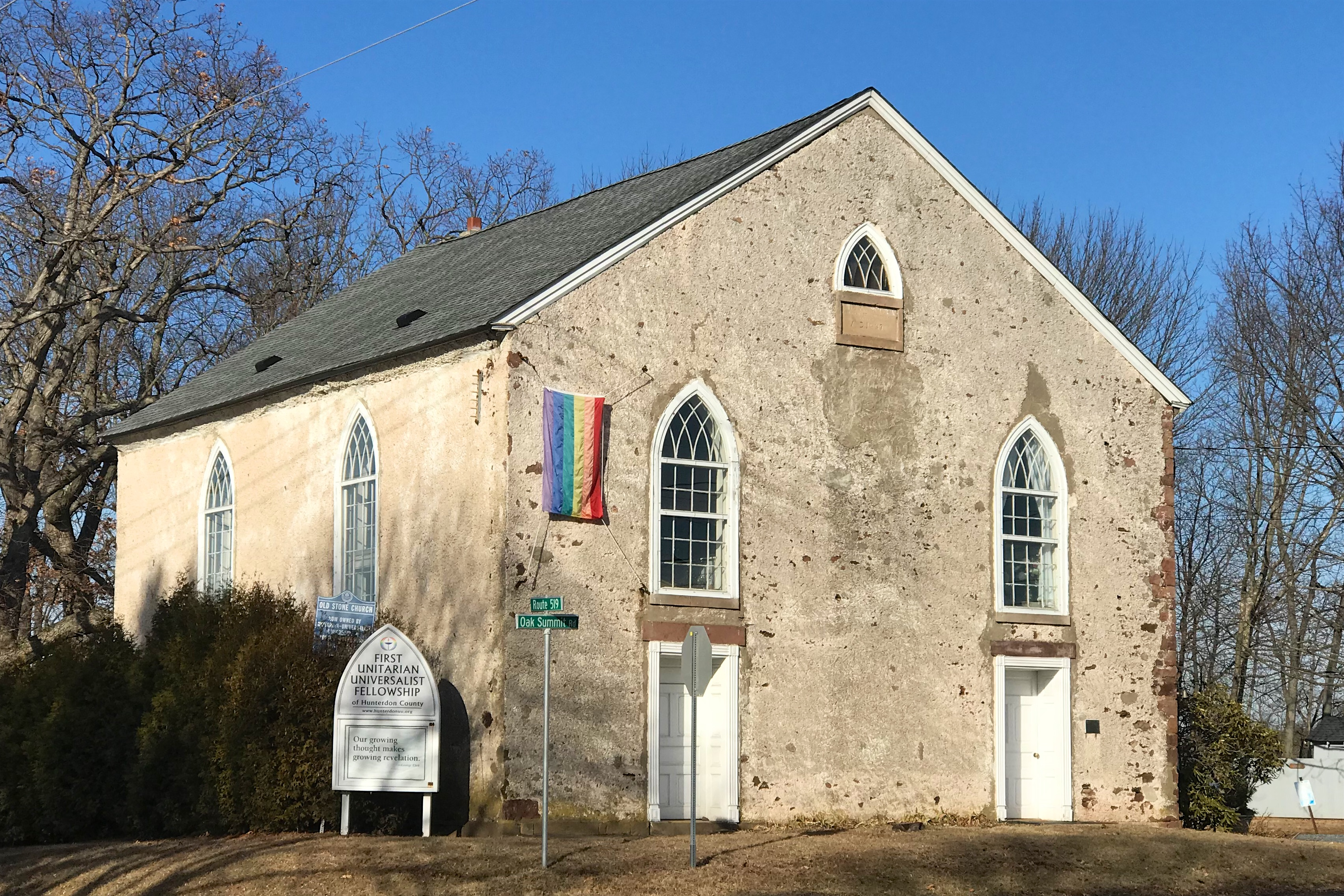
Old Stone Church

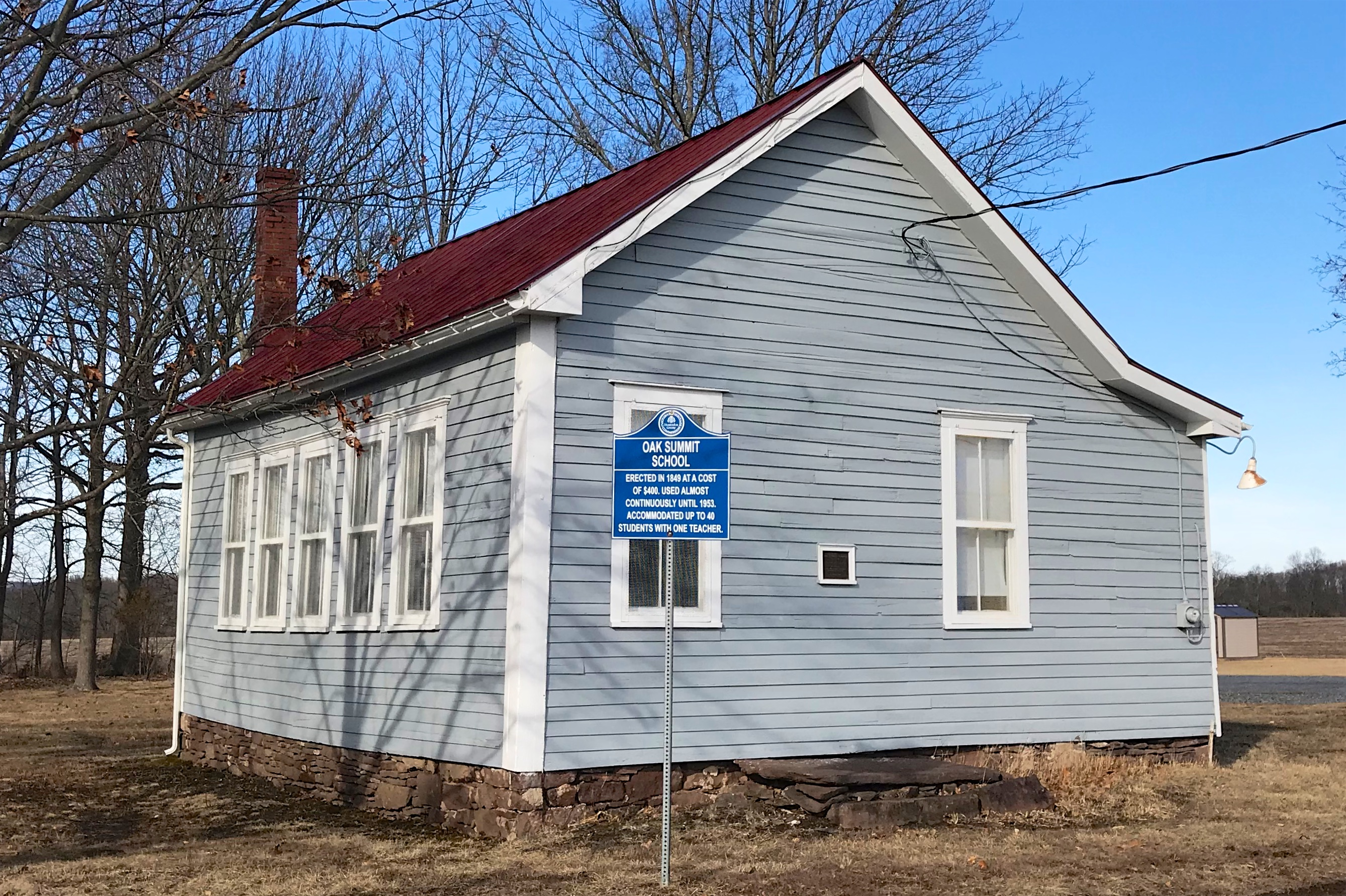
Oak Summit School

The Old Stone Church was built in 1837 and is now owned by the First Unitarian Universalist Fellowship of Hunterdon County. It was added to the National Register of Historic Places in 2018.

The Oak Summit Cemetery, across Oak Summit Road from the Old Stone Church, was established in 1754 and is now owned by the Prospect Hill Cemetery Association.

The Oak Summit School, a one-room schoolhouse, was established in 1849 and used until 1953. It is located next to the Old Stone Church.

The Thatcher House, built in 1765, featuring patterned brickwork, was added to the NRHP in 2020.

The Devil's Tea Table, is a prominent landmark near Warsaw Road on Route 29. It is the focal point of a series of bluffs that contain several geological features of interest, such as the type localities for van Houghton cycles, as well as the type sections for units of the Locatong and Passaic Formations of the Triassic. These bluffs are a regional scenic attraction and are admired by many tourists who float by on the adjacent Delaware River.

== Notable people ==
People who were born in, residents of, or otherwise closely associated with Kingwood Township include:

- George Opdyke (1805–1880), Mayor of New York City
- Billy Pauch Jr. (born 1987), professional stock car racing driver
- John Runk (1791–1872), represented New Jersey's 3rd congressional district in the United States House of Representatives from 1845 to 1847
- Kurt Wiese (1887–1974), author and children's book illustrator, including The Five Chinese Brothers and the English translation of Bambi, A Life in the Woods, the novel upon which the film Bambi was based
