= Raritan–Readington South Branch Historic District =

Historic district in New Jersey, United States

- U.S. National Register of Historic Places
- U.S. Historic district
- New Jersey Register of Historic Places
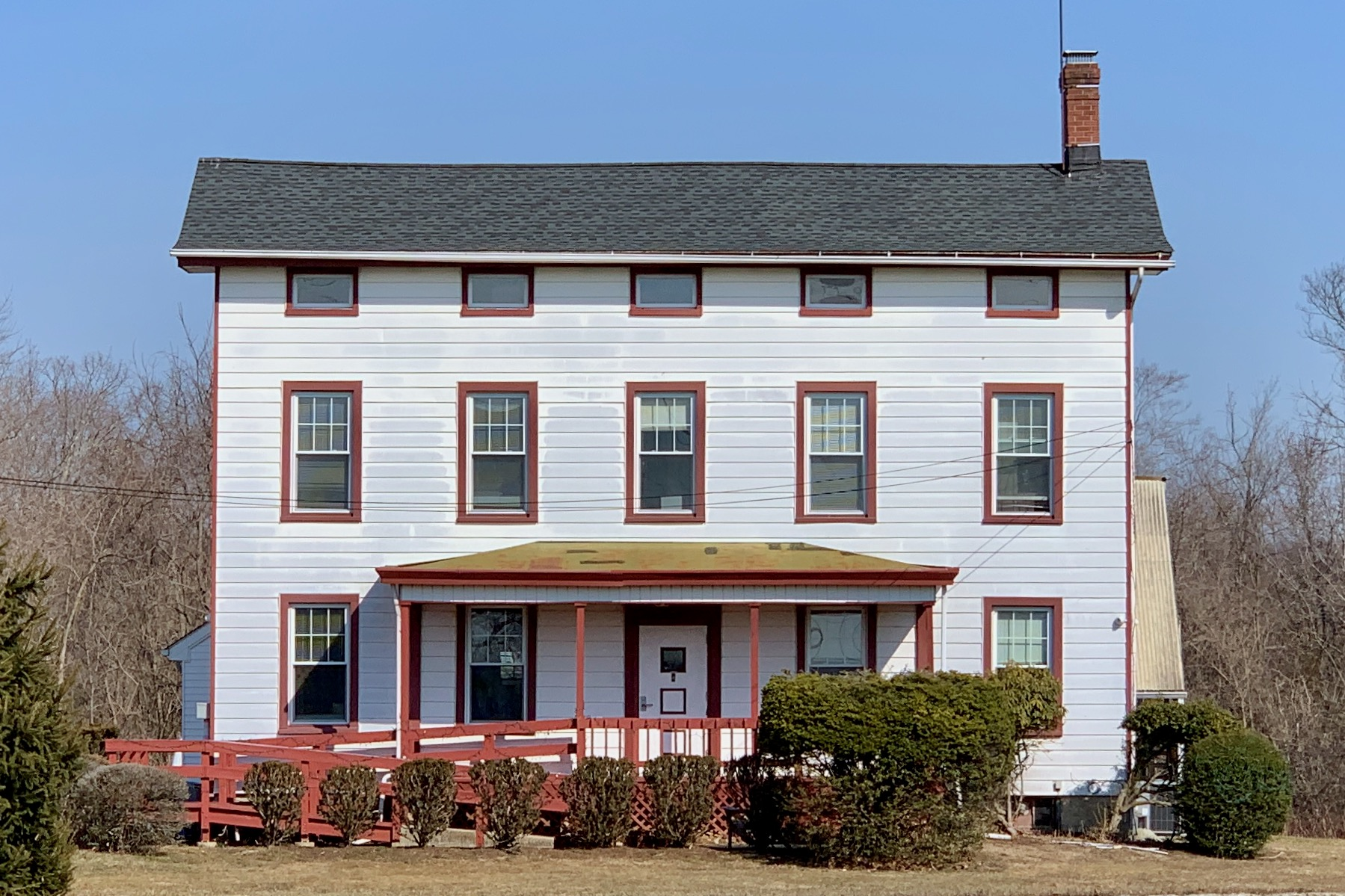
- Former Garabrant Farmstead

- Location within Hunterdon County, New Jersey Location within New Jersey Location within the United States
- Location: River Road between New Jersey Route 31 and U.S. Route 202, Raritan Township, New Jersey
- Nearest city: Flemington, New Jersey
- Coordinates: 40°31′33″N 74°50′21″W
- Area: 556 acres (225 ha)
- Architectural style: Greek Revival, Georgian, Federal
- NRHP reference No.: 89002410
- NJRHP No.: 1617

Significant dates
- Added to NRHP: January 26, 1990
- Designated NJRHP: December 7, 1989

The Raritan–Readington South Branch Historic District is a 556-acre (225 ha) historic district along River Road from New Jersey Route 31 to U.S. Route 202 near Flemington in Hunterdon County, New Jersey. It is primarily on the western side of the South Branch Raritan River in Raritan Township. It extends onto the eastern side of the river in Readington Township. County Route 523 and County Route 612 pass through the district to the north. The district encompasses the small settlements of Holcomb Mills, Flemington Junction, and Rockefellows Mills. It was added to the National Register of Historic Places on January 26, 1990, for its significance in architecture, politics, transportation, and exploration/settlement. The district includes 36 contributing buildings, four contributing structures, and three contributing sites. It also includes the John Reading Farmstead, previously listed on the NRHP individually.

== History ==
The John Reading Farmstead was built in 1760 for John Reading, former governor of the Province of New Jersey, 1757–1758.

The Flemington Junction station was built c. 1885 by the Lehigh Valley Railroad.

The one-lane Rockafellows Mill Bridge crossing the South Branch Raritan River was built in 1900 by the Wrought Iron Bridge Company of Canton, Ohio.

== Gallery ==
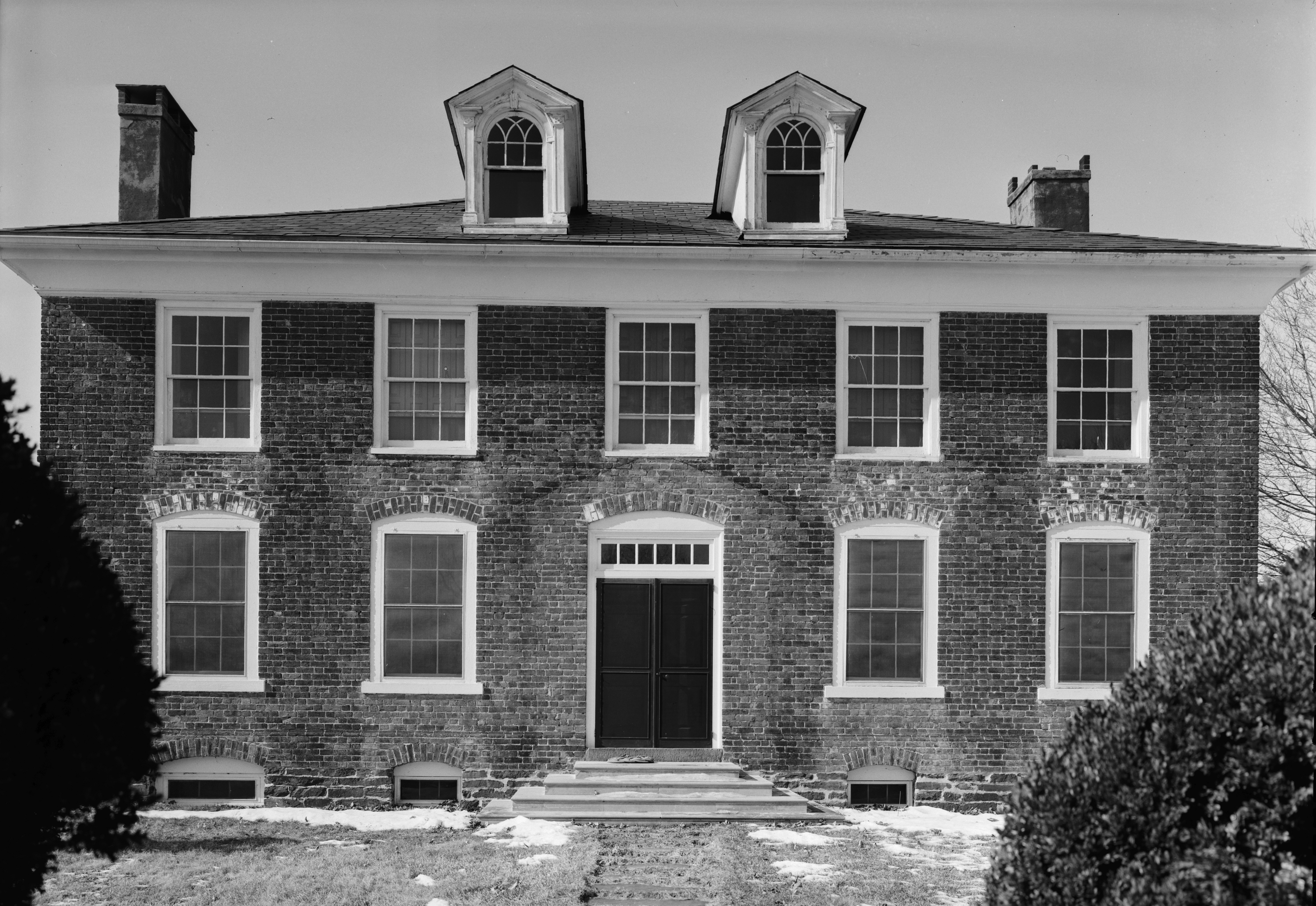
John Reading Farmstead, HABS photo from 1963

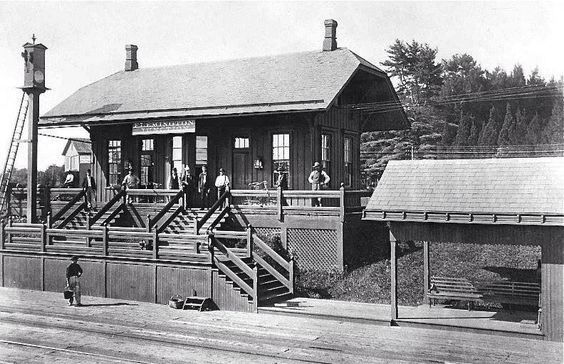
Flemington Junction station in 1895

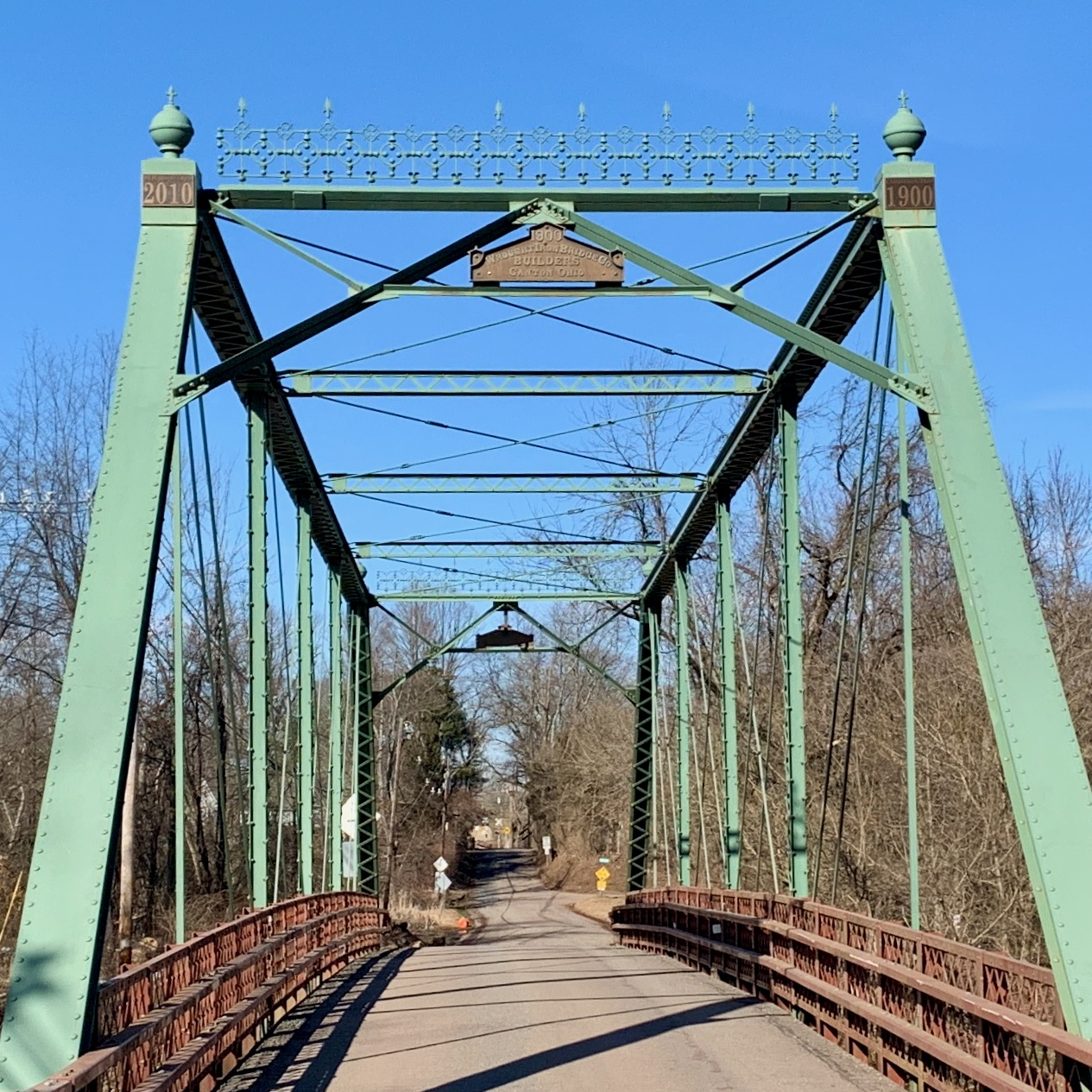
Rockafellows Mill Bridge

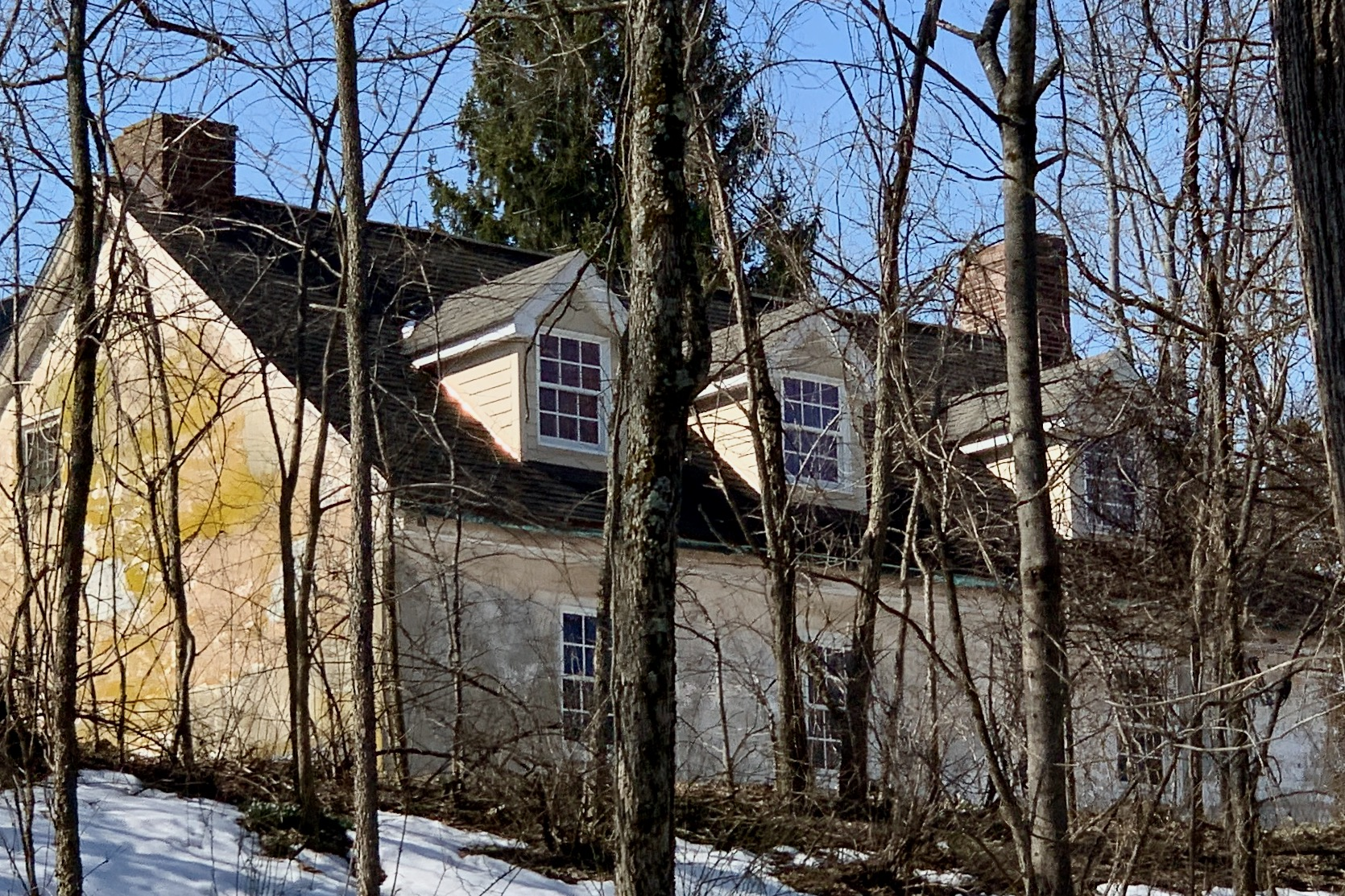
Former Atkinson-Case-Quick Farmstead
