= Flemington Junction station =

Flemington Junction
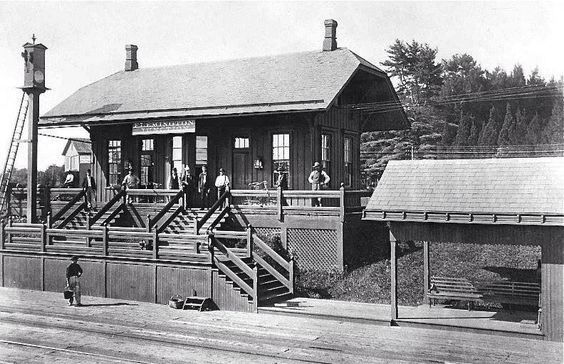
- Flemington Junction in 1895

General information
- Coordinates: 40.532569°N 74.840429°W
- Line: Lehigh Valley main line

History
- Opened: June 28, 1875
- Closed: February 4, 1961

Former lines
Preceding station	Lehigh Valley Railroad	Following station
Easton toward Buffalo	Main Line	Roselle Park toward New York or Jersey City
Landsdown toward Buffalo	Main Line	Three Bridges toward New York or Jersey City
Terminus	Flemington Branch	Flemington Terminus
Location

Flemington Junction station is a defunct Lehigh Valley Railroad station in Flemington Junction, New Jersey. It was located at the junction of the Lehigh Valley's Flemington Branch and Main Line, although the name predated the opening of the branch by eight years.

The Lehigh Valley Railroad, via its Easton and Amboy Railroad subsidiary, extended its main line east from Easton, Pennsylvania, to Jersey City, New Jersey, between 1872 and 1875. The extension officially opened on June 28, 1875. The location, which had passenger service but no passenger building, was then called Barton's Bridge. (Note: The name apparently referred to Judiah Barton, who owned land near where the Lehigh Valley's line crossed the South Branch Raritan River.) A stagecoach line carried passengers into Flemington, New Jersey proper. The company adopted the name "Flemington Junction" on April 16, 1876. A freight house opened later that year. A separate passenger building was not constructed until 1879–1882. The Flemington Branch, a 1.7-mile (2.7 km) line into Flemington, opened on August 4, 1884.

As late as 1948 a gas-electric motor car made eleven round-trips per day between Flemington Junction and Flemington, but change was coming. Buses replaced the train over the branch in 1952; the buses themselves were withdrawn in 1957. The freight house was torn down in 1955 as business declined. Passenger service to Flemington Junction ended on February 4, 1961, with the end of all passenger service on the Lehigh Valley. The Lehigh Valley abandoned the building in 1963.

The station building still stands and is a contributing property of the Raritan–Readington South Branch Historic District. The current building was scheduled to be demolished by the end of 2019, but survived until at least 2022.
