= Rockefellows Mills, New Jersey =

Populated place in Hunterdon County, New Jersey, US

- Unincorporated community
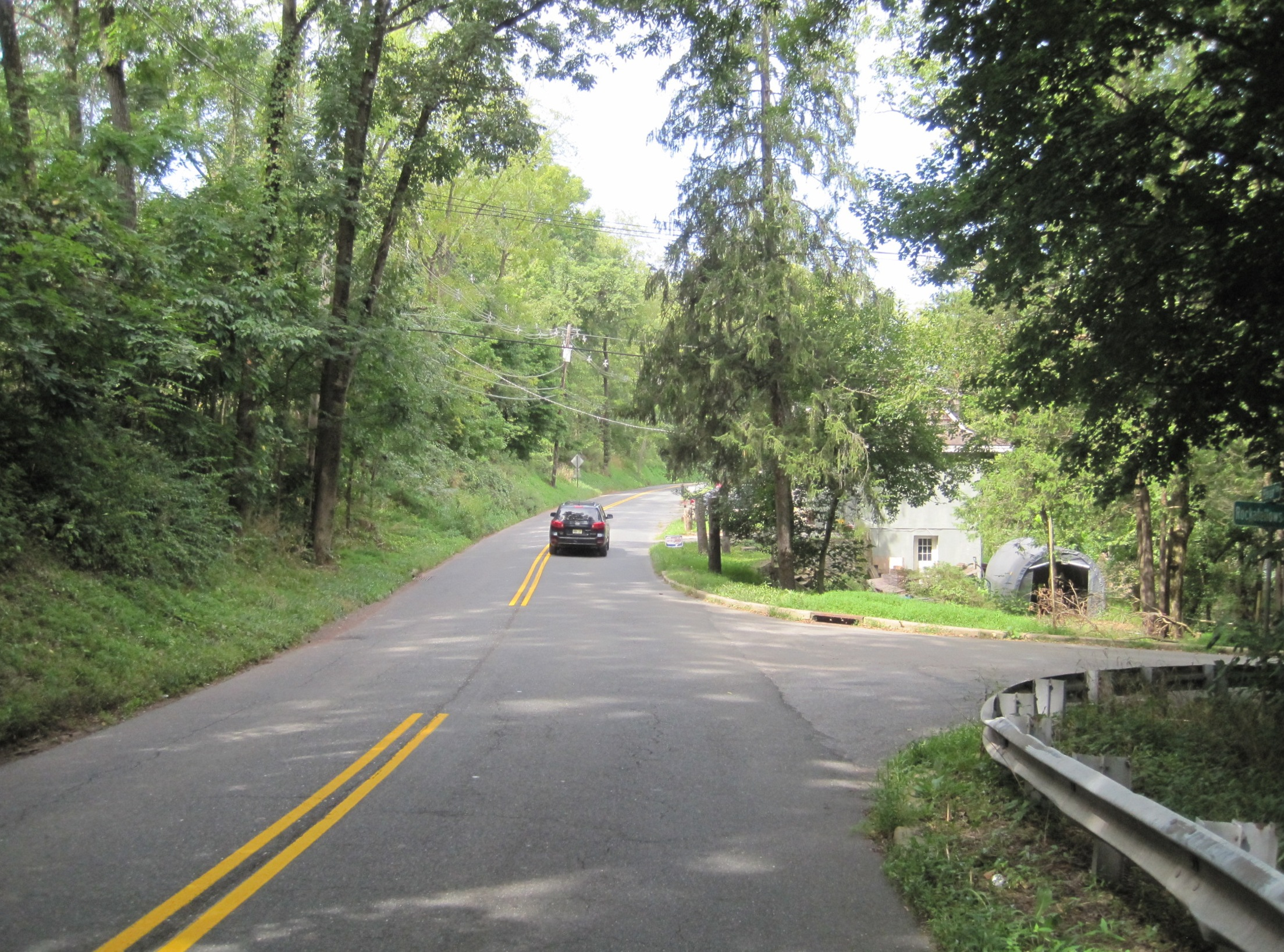
- Along eastbound River Road at Rockafellows Mills Road

- Location of Rockefellows Mills in Hunterdon County Inset: Location of county within the state of New Jersey Rockefellows Mills, New Jersey (New Jersey) Rockefellows Mills, New Jersey (the United States)
- Coordinates: 40°31′11″N 74°49′15″W
- Country: United States
- State: New Jersey
- County: Hunterdon
- Township: Raritan
- Elevation: 115 ft (35 m)
- GNIS feature ID: 879759

Rockefellows Mills (also spelled Rockafellows Mills) is an unincorporated community located within Raritan Township in Hunterdon County, in the U.S. state of New Jersey. The settlement is located along the South Branch Raritan River near Three Bridges. The river is spanned in the area by the historic Rockafellows Mill Bridge built in 1900 and part of the Raritan–Readington South Branch Historic District. Most of the area within the Raritan Township side of the river is forested however on the north side of the river in Readington Township, some farmland dots the area.

== Gallery ==
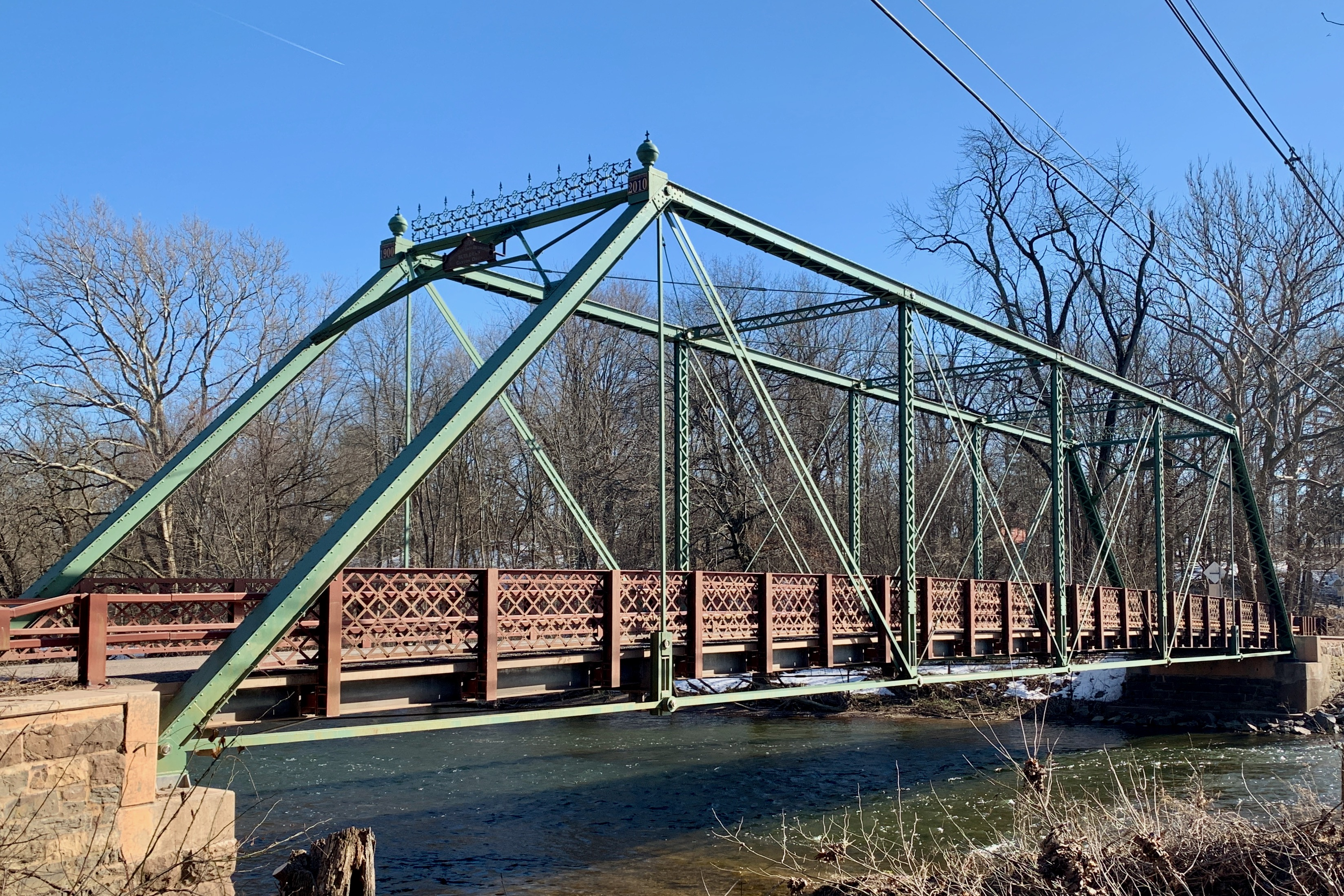
Rockafellows Mill Bridge crossing the South Branch Raritan River
