= Easton station (Pennsylvania) =

Easton
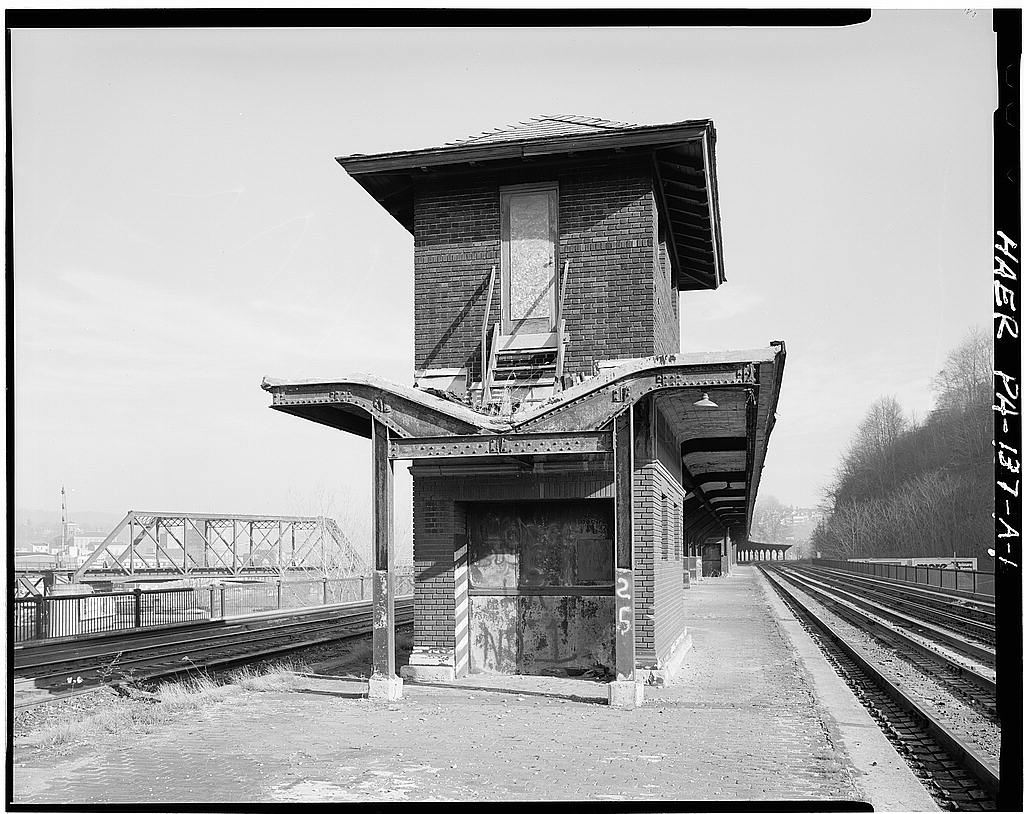
- The former station photographed in 1979, prior to its demolition

General information
- Location: Third and Canal Street; Easton, Pennsylvania
- Coordinates: 40.6861°N 75.2084°W
- System: Former Lehigh Valley Railroad station
- Tracks: 2

Construction
- Accessible: No

Former lines
Preceding station	Lehigh Valley Railroad	Following station
Bethlehem toward Buffalo	Main Line	Flemington Junction toward New York or Jersey City
Redington toward Buffalo	Main Line	Phillipsburg toward New York or Jersey City
13th Street Junction toward Belfast Junction	Easton and Northern Branch	Terminus
Location

Easton is a defunct train station in Easton, Pennsylvania. It was originally built by the Lehigh Valley Railroad. As of 2017, the structure still exists and was blighted for at least 20 years, since its closing in the 1970s. The city of Easton obtained permission from Norfolk Southern Railway to clean up the property. The location only recently became a focal point for the city with the opening of Interstate 78 in the 1990s.

The Central Railroad of New Jersey (CNJ) had an Easton station of its own on the other side of the Lehigh River.

== History ==
The Lehigh Valley Railroad opened its original line between Allentown and Easton in 1855; the first passenger train ran between the two cities on June 11. The Lehigh Valley's line ran across the Lehigh River from downtown Easton. For the first year the Lehigh Valley used what the chief engineer Robert H. Sayre described as a "temporary passenger depot". A permanent station, built by the CNJ on Lehigh Valley land, opened toward the end of 1856. This new station had two levels: the upper level was used by the CNJ and Lehigh Valley, while the lower level was used by the Belvidere Delaware Railroad. Sayre characterized this station as "combustible" and proposed replacing it with one made of stone.

The Lehigh Valley's second permanent station opened on the same site on September 14, 1868. The Easton Express considered the new structure "handsome". The new building was made of brick and stood two stories high. The lower level contained a baggage room, waiting rooms, a ticket office and a dining room with attached kitchen. The upper level contained railroad offices.

According to The Lafayette, the student newspaper of Lafayette College, the station stopped receiving passenger trains in 1961, closing to freight traffic in the 1970's due to a decline in demand for coal. On July 24, 1985, its platforms and canopy were removed, and it currently sits abandoned next to the Lehigh River.
