= Rockafellows Mill Bridge =

- U.S. Historic district – Contributing property
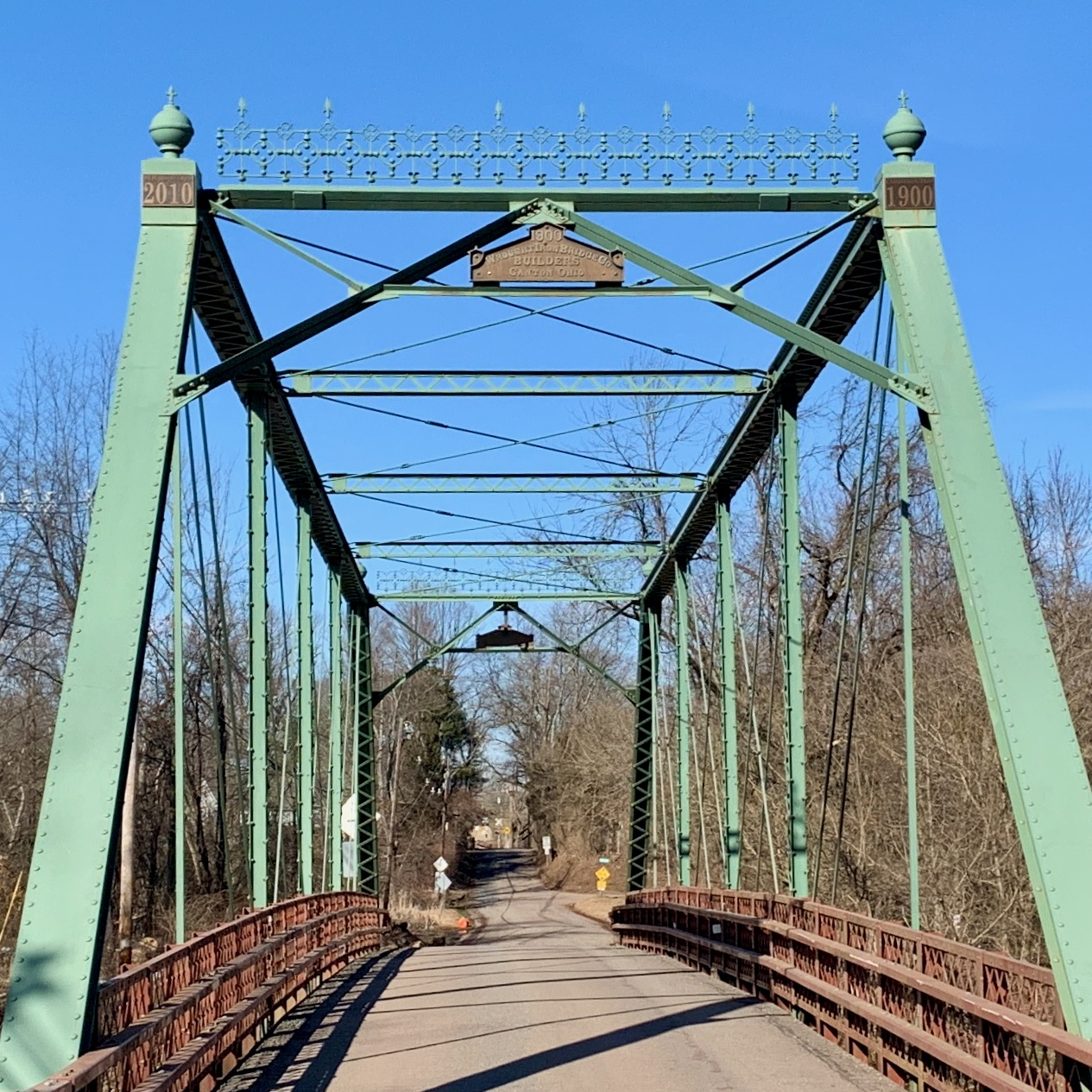
- Rehabilitated bridge with historic plaque

- Location within Hunterdon County, New Jersey Location within New Jersey Location within the United States
- Location: Rockafellows Mill Road; Rockefellows Mills, New Jersey
- Coordinates: 40°31′14.5″N 74°49′13.5″W
- Built by: Wrought Iron Bridge Company
- Part of: Raritan–Readington South Branch Historic District (ID89002410)
- Designated CP: January 26, 1990

The Rockafellows Mill Bridge is a one-lane Pratt thru truss bridge that carries Rockafellows Mill Road over the South Branch Raritan River in Rockefellows Mills, Hunterdon County, New Jersey. The bridge was added to the National Register of Historic Places on January 26, 1990, as part of the Raritan–Readington South Branch Historic District.

== History ==
The bridge was constructed in 1900 by the Wrought Iron Bridge Company of Canton, Ohio. In 2010, it was rehabilitated, while maintaining its historic structure. It is now 140 feet (43 m) long and 15.5 feet (4.7 m) wide.

== Gallery ==
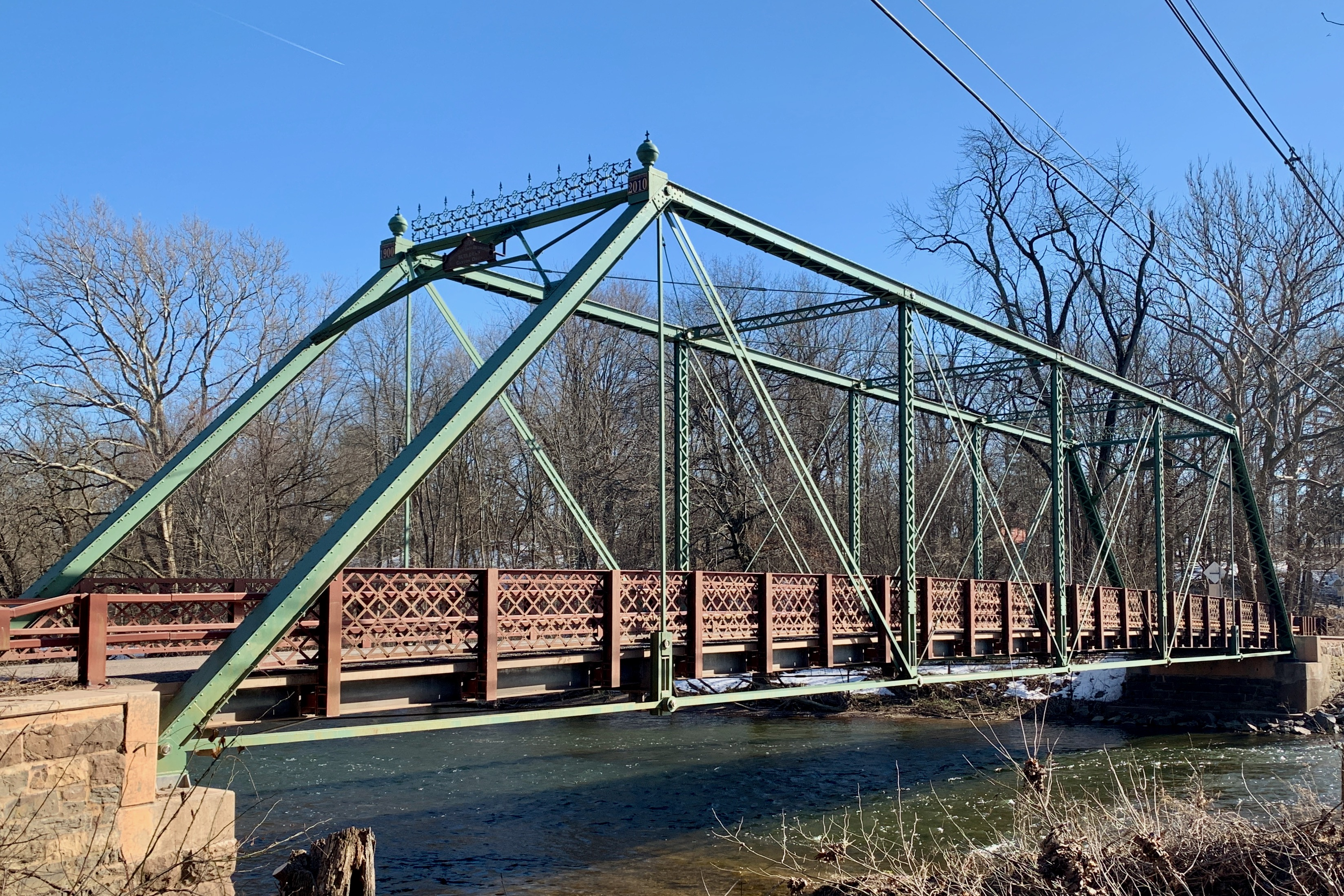
Crossing the South Branch Raritan River

== See also ==
- List of bridges on the National Register of Historic Places in New Jersey
- List of crossings of the Raritan River
