= John Reading Farmstead =

Historic house in New Jersey, United States

- U.S. National Register of Historic Places
- New Jersey Register of Historic Places
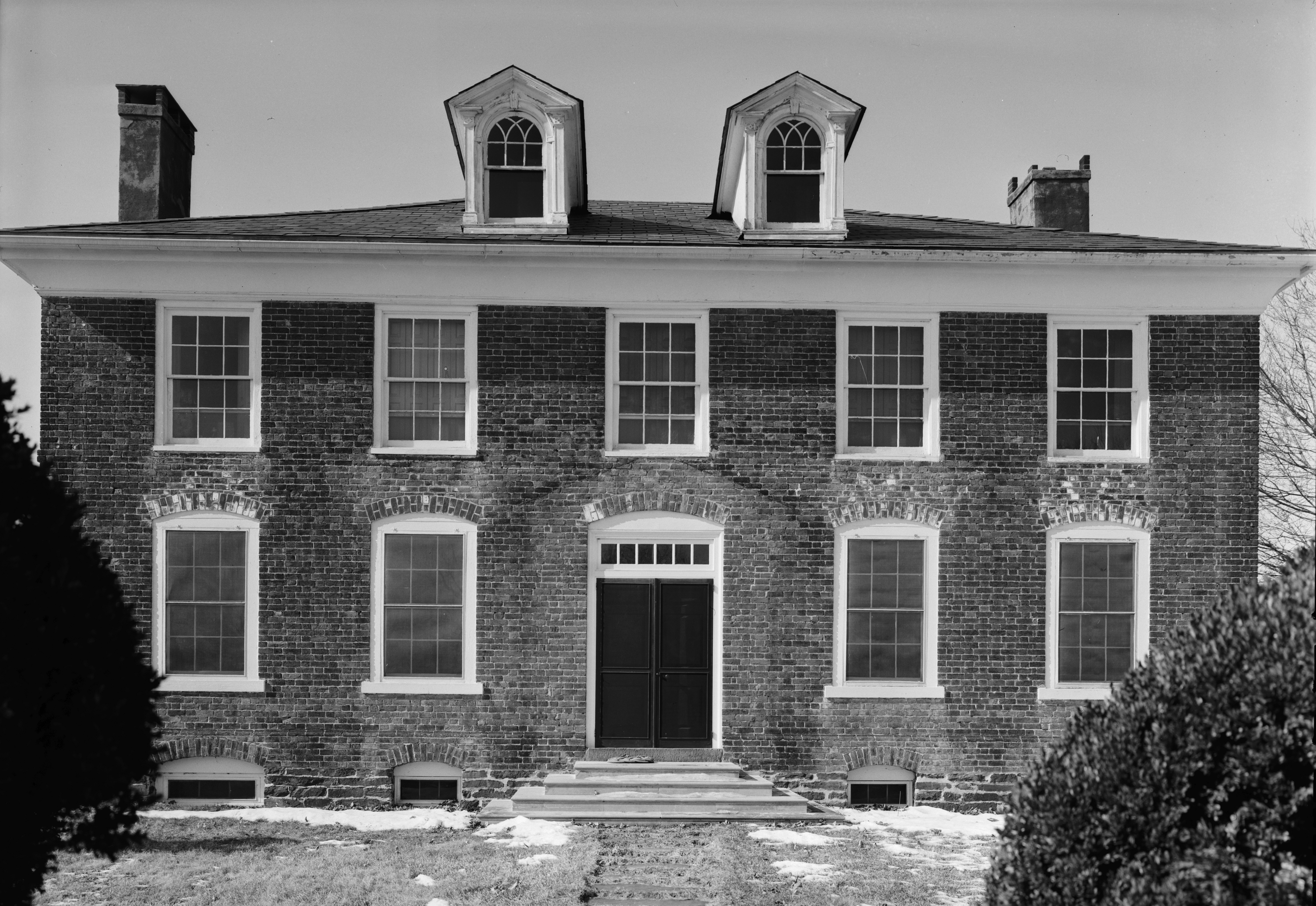
- HABS photo from 1963

- Location within Hunterdon County, New Jersey Location within New Jersey Location within the United States
- Location: 76 River Road; Raritan Township, New Jersey
- Nearest city: Flemington, New Jersey
- Coordinates: 40°31′30″N 74°50′13″W
- Area: 19.1 acres (7.7 ha)
- Built: 1760
- Architectural style: Georgian
- NRHP reference No.: 78001767
- NJRHP No.: 1618

Significant dates
- Added to NRHP: November 21, 1978
- Designated NJRHP: April 27, 1978

The John Reading Farmstead is a historic house located at 76 River Road by the South Branch Raritan River in Raritan Township, near Flemington in Hunterdon County, New Jersey. It was built in 1760 for John Reading, former governor of the Province of New Jersey, 1757–1758. The house was added to the National Register of Historic Places on November 21, 1978, for its significance in agriculture, architecture, politics, and exploration/settlement.

== History ==
From 1712 to 1715, John Reading, a surveyor at the time, bought 600 acres (240 ha) of land along the South Branch of the Raritan River. After he retired from government, he built this house in 1760, based on the Trenton mansion used by governor Lewis Morris (1671–1746).

== Description ==
The house is built of brick in Georgian style and features Flemish bond brickwork. The west wall has the date, 1760, in glazed header bricks. The property includes a shed and two attached barns to the south. The 19.1-acre (7.7 ha) property overlooks the South Branch of the Raritan River.

== Gallery ==
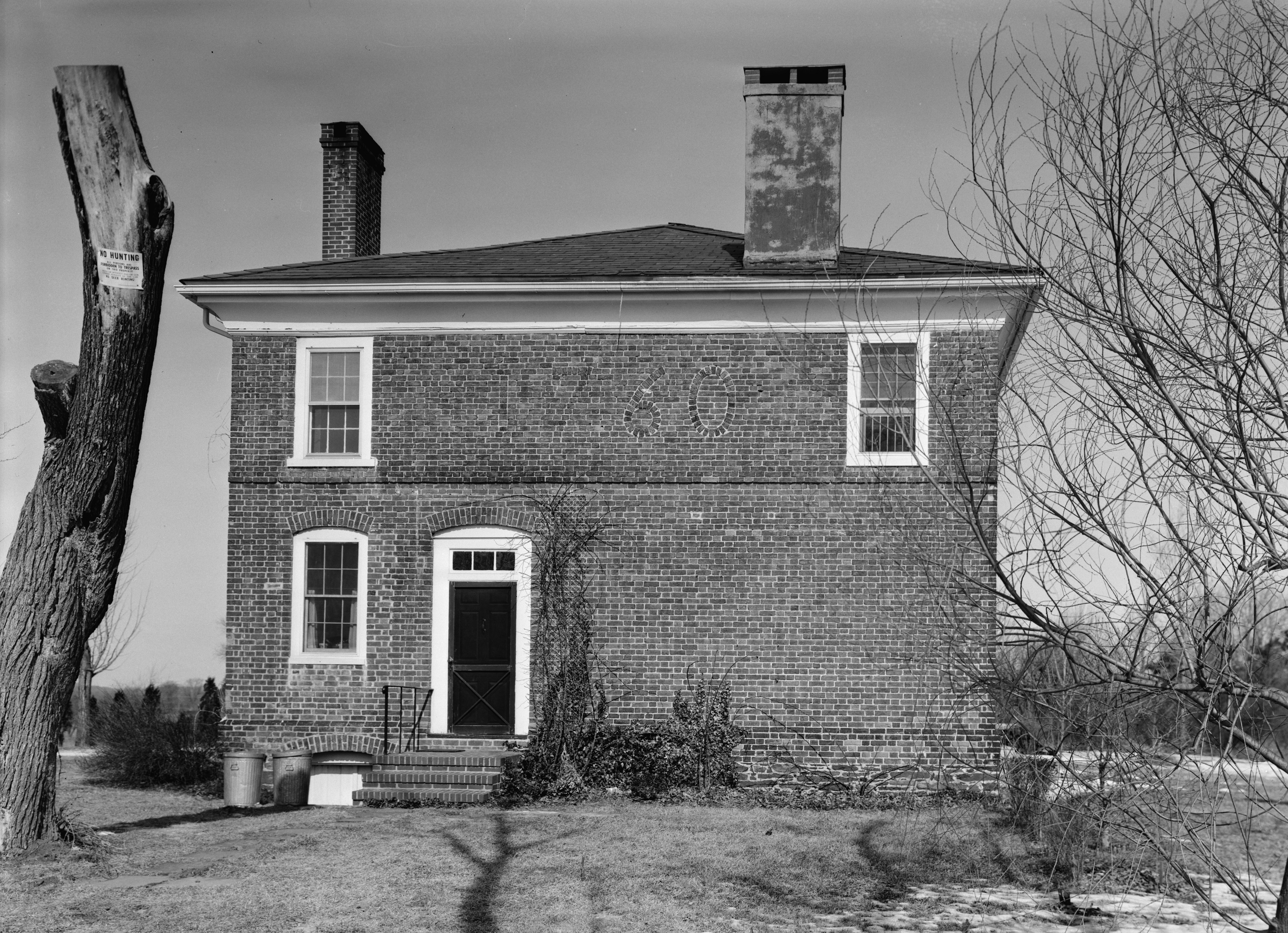
Construction date in brickwork

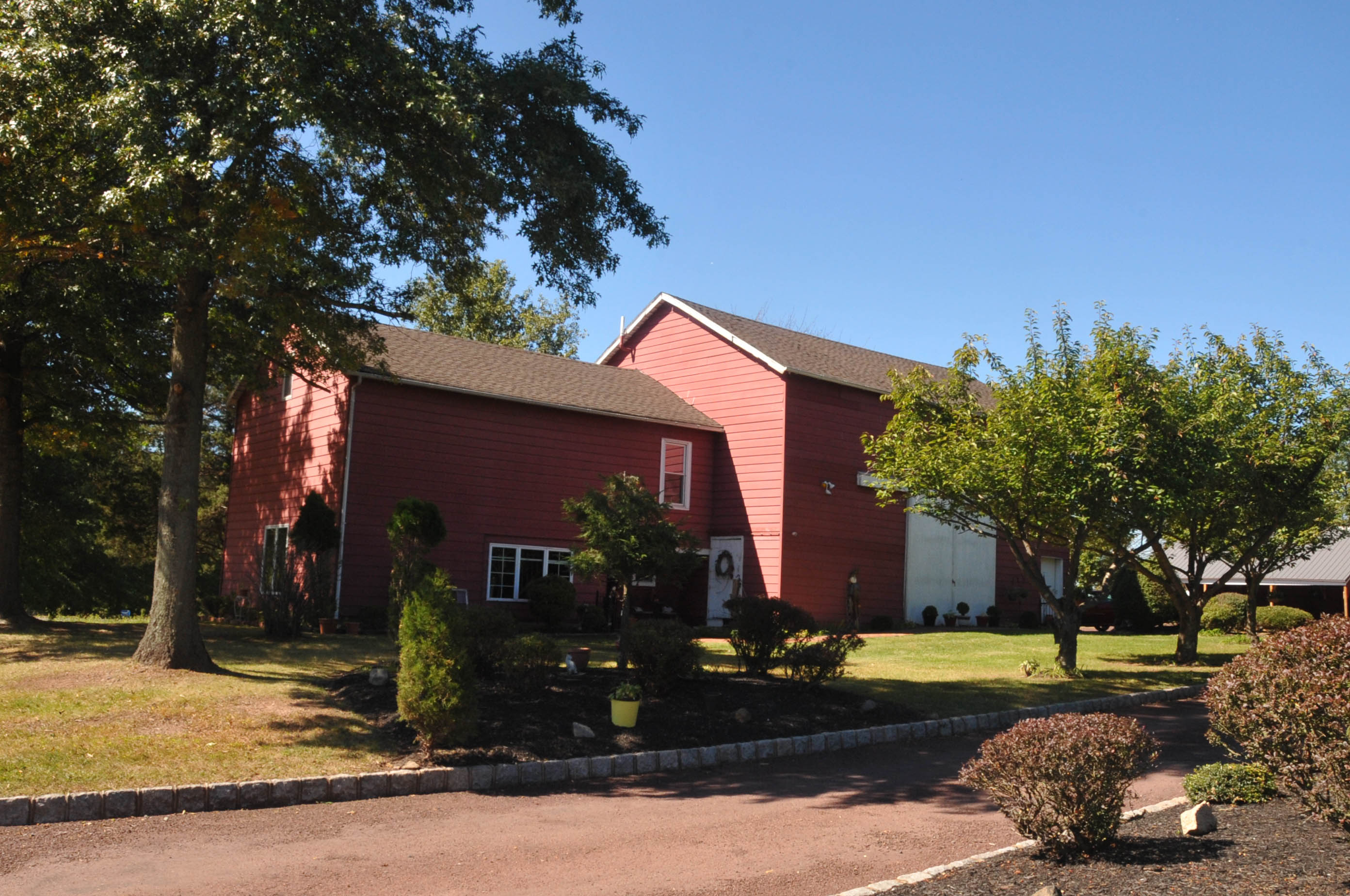
Two attached barns

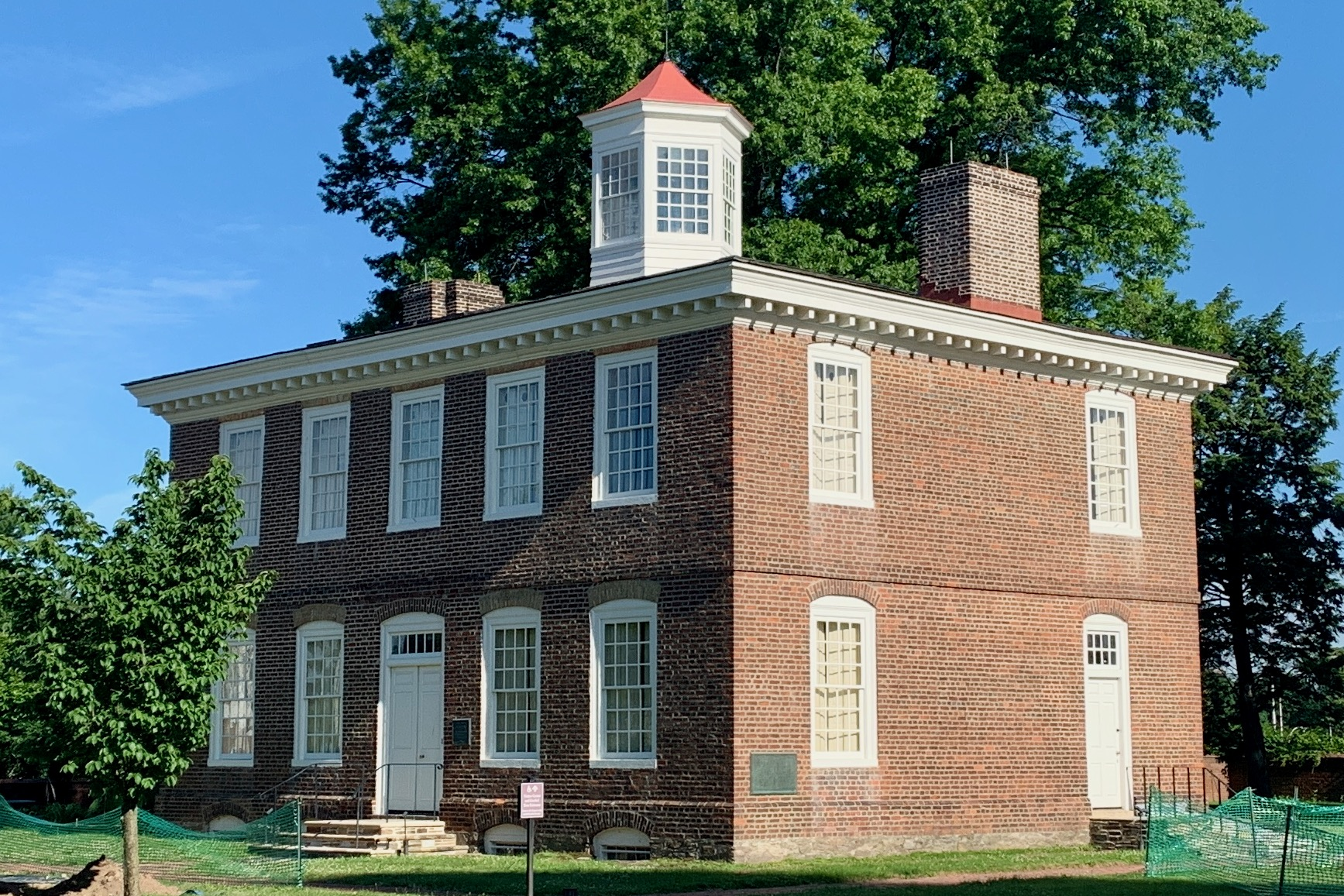
William Trent House, used by governor Lewis Morris

== See also ==
- List of the oldest buildings in New Jersey
