= Flemington Branch =

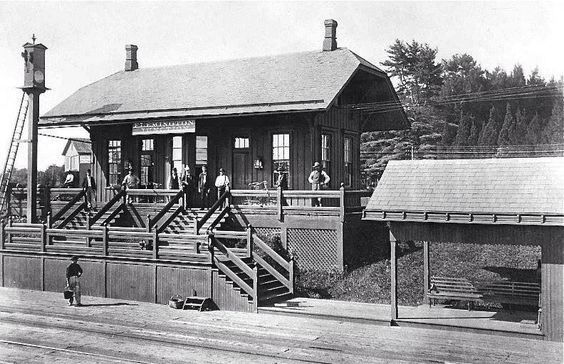
- Flemington Junction station in 1895

Overview
- Stations: 2

Service
- System: Lehigh Valley Railroad

History
- Opened: 4 August 1884
- Conveyed to Conrail: 1 April 1976
- Closed: 25 July 1982

Technical
- Line length: 1.7 mi (2.7 km)
- Track gauge: 1,435 mm (4 ft 8 1/2 in) standard gauge

The Flemington Branch was a railroad line in Hunterdon County, New Jersey. It was owned and operated by the Lehigh Valley Railroad. It connected the borough of Flemington, New Jersey, with the Lehigh Valley's main line. It was opened in 1884 and abandoned in 1982.

== History ==
The Lehigh Valley Railroad, via its Easton and Amboy Railroad subsidiary, extended its main line east from Easton, Pennsylvania, to Jersey City, New Jersey, between 1872 and 1875. The extension officially opened on June 28, 1875. The line bypassed Flemington proper; trains served the community at Flemington Junction, roughly 2 miles (3.2 km) to the north. Two railroads, the Central Railroad of New Jersey and the Pennsylvania Railroad, already had stations in Flemington.

The Lehigh Valley had contemplated building a branch to Flemington since 1876, but work did not begin until 1883. A source of some controversy within Flemington was the proposed location of the station, as the two existing stations were located near each other in the center of the borough. Ultimately the Lehigh Valley selected a site on the north side, about 1 mile (1.6 km) north of the other two stations. The branch opened on August 4, 1884. The Lehigh Valley considered but did not extend the branch to Stockton, New Jersey, on the Delaware River.

Passenger service over the branch ended in 1952, replaced by buses. Limited freight service continued. The bankrupt Lehigh Valley was incorporated into Conrail; the Flemington Branch was designated to Conrail as part of the United States Railway Association's "Final System Plan". The Flemington Branch was one of several dozen lines abandoned by Conrail in the wake of the Staggers Rail Act and Northeast Rail Service Act of 1981, which deregulated many aspects of the railroad industry in the United States. The line was formally abandoned on July 25, 1982.
