= Interstate 78 in New Jersey =

Highway in New Jersey

Interstate 78
- I-78 highlighted in red

Route information
- Maintained by NJDOT, DRJTBC, NJTA, and PANYNJ
- Length: 67.83 mi (109.16 km)
- Existed: 1958–present
- History: Completed in 1989
- NHS: Entire route
- Restrictions: No hazardous goods in Holland Tunnel

Major junctions
- West end: I-78 at the Pennsylvania state line in Phillipsburg
- US 22 / Route 122 / Route 173 in Greenwich Township; Route 173 in Bloomsbury; Route 31 in Clinton Township; I-287 in Bedminster; Route 24 in Springfield; G.S. Parkway at the Union–Hillside township line; US 1-9 / US 22 / Route 21 in Newark; I-95 Toll / N.J. Turnpike in Newark; Route 185 / Route 440 in Jersey City; Route 139 in Jersey City
- East end: I-78 at the New York state line in Jersey City

Location
- Country: United States
- State: New Jersey
- Counties: Warren, Hunterdon, Somerset, Union, Essex, Hudson

Highway system
- Interstate Highway System; Main; Auxiliary; Suffixed; Business; Future; New Jersey State Highway Routes; Interstate; US; State; Scenic Byways
← Route 77	→ Route 79
← Route 10	Route 11	→ Route 12

Interstate 78 (I-78) is an east–west route stretching from Union Township, Lebanon County, Pennsylvania, to New York City. In New Jersey, I-78 is called the Phillipsburg–Newark Expressway and the Newark Bay Extension of the New Jersey Turnpike. The highway runs for 67.83 miles (109.16 km) in the northern part of the state of New Jersey from the Interstate 78 Toll Bridge over the Delaware River at the Pennsylvania state line in Phillipsburg, Warren County, east to the Holland Tunnel under the Hudson River at the New York state line in Jersey City, Hudson County. The Phillipsburg–Newark Expressway portion of I-78, formally called the Lightning Division Memorial Highway, runs from the Phillipsburg area east across rural areas of Western New Jersey before entering suburban areas in Somerset County. The road crosses the Watchung Mountains, widening into a local–express lane configuration at Route 24 as it continues through urban areas to Newark. Here, I-78 intersects the mainline of the New Jersey Turnpike (I-95) and becomes the Newark Bay Extension, crossing the Newark Bay Bridge and continuing to Jersey City. The route, along with Route 139, follows a one-way pair of surface streets to the Holland Tunnel.

In 1927, Route 11 was legislated as a high-speed bypass of U.S. Route 22 (US 22) between Whitehouse and Warren Township but was never built. The earliest parts of I-78 to be built were the Holland Tunnel in 1927 and the Newark Bay Extension. With the creation of the Interstate Highway System in the 1950s, a highway was planned along US 22 through northern New Jersey, becoming I-78 in 1958. The highway between Phillipsburg and Newark was built in various stages from the 1960s to 1989, with the final segment opening at the I-78 Toll Bridge. The section of highway through the Watchung Mountains and across Newark garnered opposition from environmentalists and residents who were worried about the effects of the highway. In addition, there was opposition to building I-78 through Phillipsburg, which resulted in the alignment to the south of the Lehigh Valley. In the 2000s, I-78 was completely rebuilt between Route 24 and the Garden State Parkway. In addition, missing movements between the parkway and I-78 were completed in 2010.

== Route description ==
=== Warren and Hunterdon counties ===
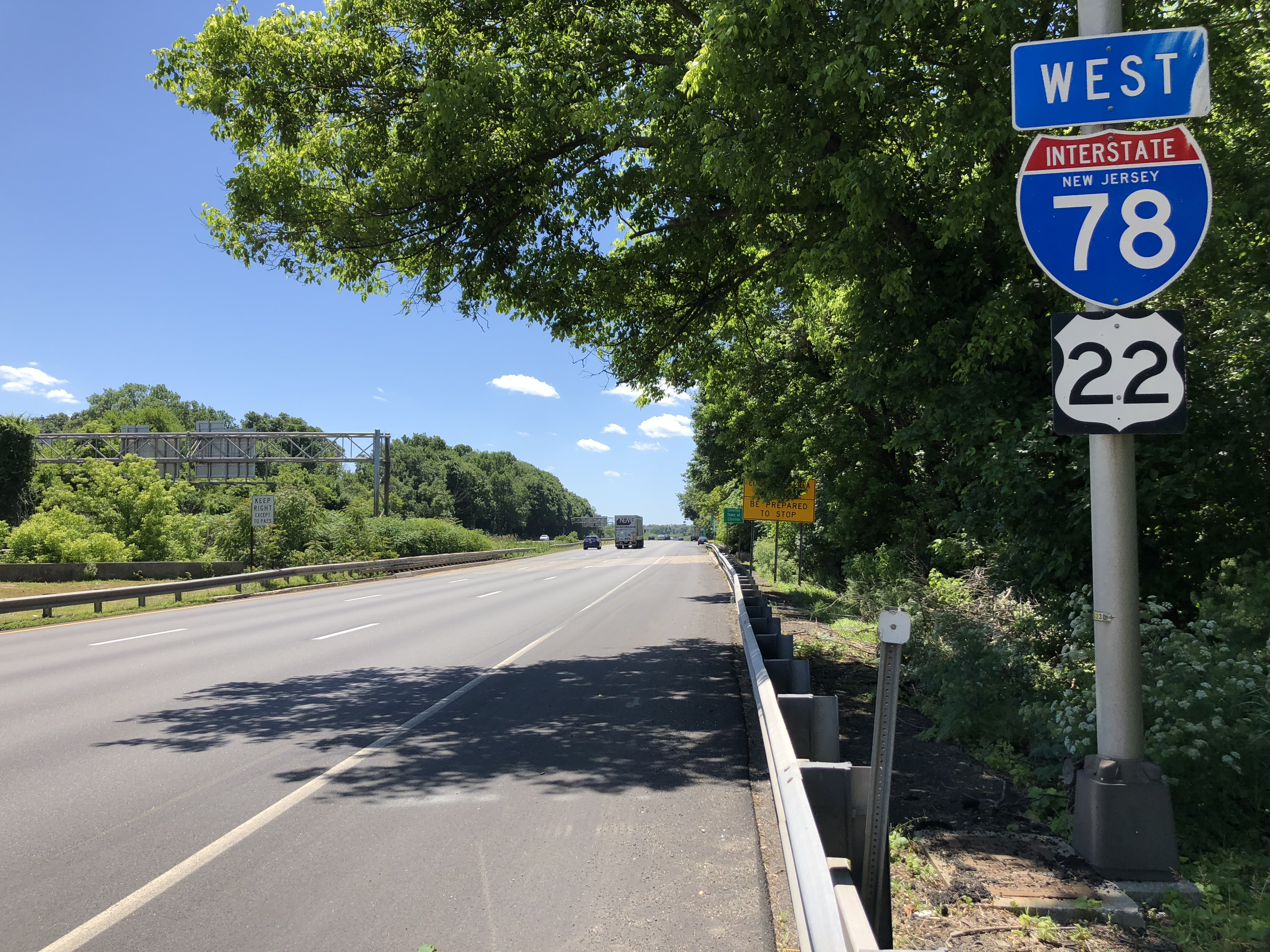
I-78/US 22 westbound past Route 31 interchange in Clinton

I-78 enters New Jersey from Pennsylvania on the I-78 Toll Bridge over the Delaware River and the Belvidere and Delaware River Railway, heading into Phillipsburg, Warren County. The highway heads south into agricultural areas as a six-lane freeway that is maintained by the Delaware River Joint Toll Bridge Commission (DRJTBC), entering Pohatcong Township a short distance after the river. The freeway makes a turn to the east as it briefly passes through a corner of Alpha before coming back into Pohatcong Township. Bypassing the center of Alpha to the south, I-78 passes under Norfolk Southern Railway's Lehigh Line and has two more segments that enter the Alpha borough limits before coming to an interchange with US 22 and the western terminus of Route 173. At this point, US 22 runs concurrently with I-78, and the road comes into Greenwich Township. At this point, the New Jersey Department of Transportation (NJDOT) takes over maintenance of the road. I-78/US 22 continues east through Greenwich Township, coming to a westbound exit and eastbound entrance with South Main Street (CR 637). The road turns southeast and has an eastbound exit and westbound entrance with Bloomsbury Road (CR 632) in Franklin Township. Within the ramps for this interchange, there are weigh stations in both directions.

A short distance after this interchange, I-78/US 22 crosses the Musconetcong River into Bloomsbury, Hunterdon County. In Bloomsbury, the road has an interchange with Route 173. After this interchange, the freeway enters Bethlehem Township, with Route 173 closely running to the north of I-78/US 22. The road comes to a bridge over Norfolk Southern Railway's Central Running Track line and has rest areas in both directions before it passes over Norfolk Southern Railway's Lehigh Line and turns southeast to cross the Musconetcong Mountain. As the freeway crosses the Jugtown Mountain, there is an automatic deicing spray, the first such to be installed in New Jersey.

The freeway turns east again and enters Union Township, coming to an interchange with Pattenburg Road (CR 614) and Route 173. From here, I-78/US 22 continues east directly to the south of Route 173, coming to another interchange with that route as well as Mechlin Corner Road (CR 625). Entering more commercial areas, Route 173 merges onto I-78/US 22 at exit 13. At exit 15, the highway intersects Pittstown Road (CR 513), and Route 173 splits from I-78/US 22 by heading north on CR 513. At this point, the freeway enters Franklin Township briefly at exit 15 and then enters Clinton where it crosses the South Branch of the Raritan River. I-78/US 22 turns northeast and leaves Clinton for Clinton Township, where it has an eastbound exit and westbound entrance for Route 173 that also provides access to Route 31. Immediately after is the interchange with Route 31. At the next interchange near the community of Annandale, US 22 splits from I-78 onto a four-lane surface highway, heading closely to the south of that route.

Immediately after the split, I-78 passes over NJ Transit's Raritan Valley Line and runs through rural areas with increasing suburban development. The freeway runs through Lebanon, where an exit for Cokesbury Road (CR 639) provides access to the town and the Round Valley Recreation Area. After running through Clinton Township and into Readington Township, US 22 turns southeast while I-78 continues a due east course. In Tewksbury Township, there is an interchange with Oldwick Road (CR 523) that also provides access to CR 517. After this exit, the highway crosses back into Readington.

=== Somerset and Union counties ===
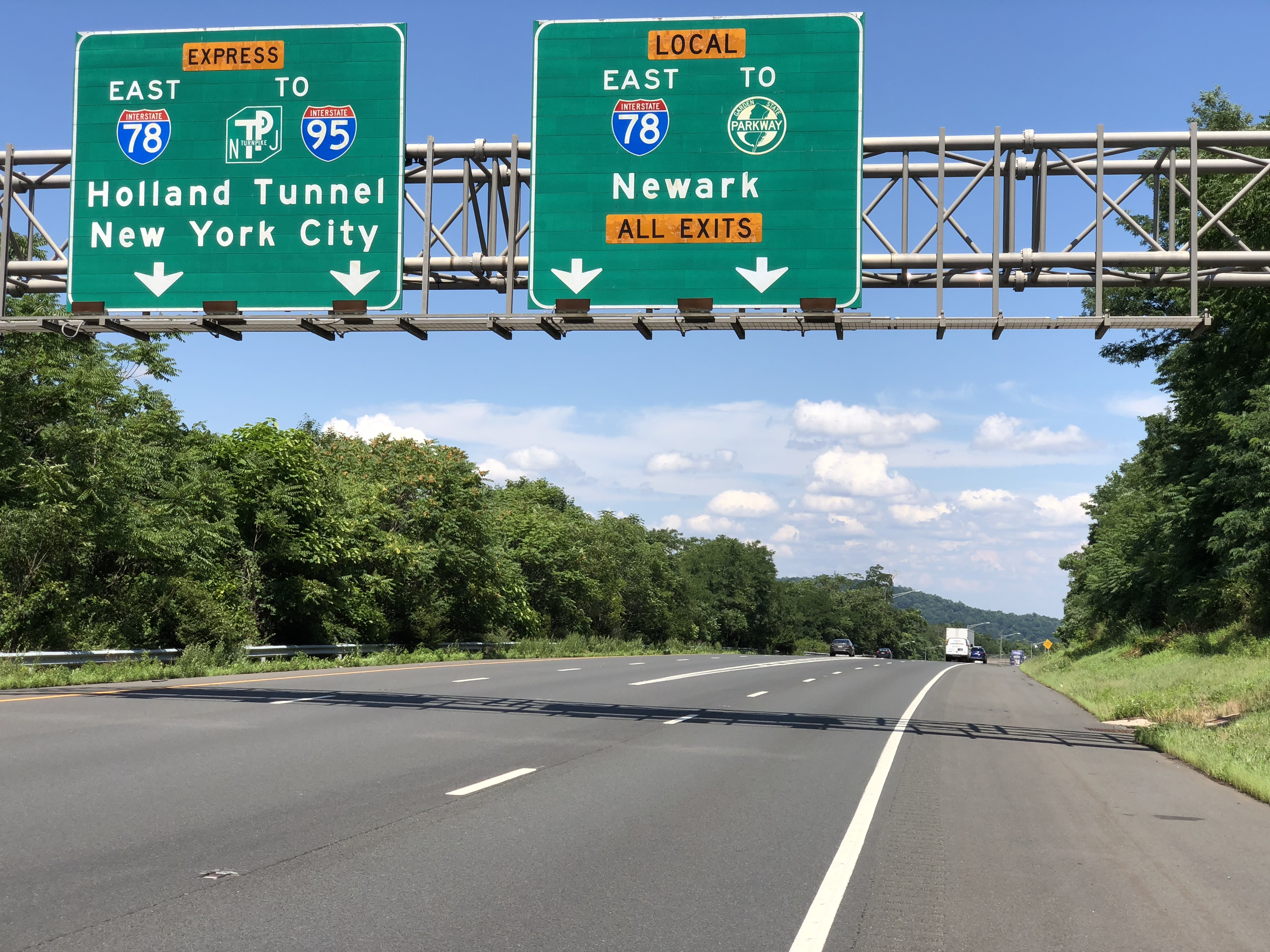
A local express lane split on I-78 east just west of the Route 24 interchange in Springfield Township

After crossing the Lamington River, I-78 comes into Bedminster, Somerset County, continuing east through more woods and farms with some suburban residential areas. Upon entering Somerset County, there is an exit for Rattlesnake Bridge Road (CR 665) (signed as CR 523 Spur). The next interchange, exit 29, is called the Vincent R. Kramer Interchange. It is at I-287, which serves as a bypass around New York City. At this point, I-78 carries four eastbound lanes and three westbound lanes as the median widens. The road enters wooded suburban areas and crosses the Second Watchung Mountain, running through a corner of Bridgewater Township, where there is a westbound scenic overlook, before coming into Bernards Township. The eastbound direction narrows back to three lanes before the interchange with Martinsville Road (CR 525), at which point the freeway crosses into Warren Township. The road heads east along the southern bank of the Dead River, coming to exit 36 for King George Road (CR 651). I-78 heads farther south of the Dead River as it comes to the interchange with Hillcrest Road (CR 531). Past Hillcrest Road (CR 531), the highway turns to the northeast and comes to an interchange with Drift Road/Dale Road that provides access to US 22. At this point, I-78 runs across the Second Watchung Mountain again into Watchung.

The freeway crosses the Green Brook into Berkeley Heights, Union County, reaching exits for Diamond Hill Road (CR 655) and McMane Avenue (CR 640). The latter is an eastbound exit and entrance that also provides access to parallel Glenside Avenue (CR 527). At this point, I-78 runs between Second Watchung Mountain to the northwest and the Watchung Reservation to the southeast. Along the reservation border, the road passes under Nikesite Road before coming into Summit, where there is an overpass that serves as a wildlife crossing. There is an eastbound exit and westbound entrance with Glenside Avenue (CR 527) as it heads away from the Watchung Reservation and into more suburban surroundings. It briefly forms the border between Summit to the northwest and Mountainside to the southeast before coming into Springfield Township. The freeway passes near the First Watchung Mountain before coming to the interchange with Route 24, where suburban development becomes more dense.

At Route 24, I-78 divides into local–express lanes, with three express and three local lanes eastbound and two express and three local lanes westbound. In this section of the highway, most access is via the local lanes, though the next exit for Route 124 includes a direct westbound onramp to the express lanes. Before Route 124, I-78 briefly runs east through Millburn, Essex County, and Springfield again before entering Union Township at the interchange. Past Route 124, I-78 carries a 3-2-2-3–lane configuration and comes to partial interchanges with Vauxhall Road (CR 630) and Burnet Avenue (CR 633). The next interchange along the highway provides access to the Garden State Parkway along the border of Union and Hillside. The road turns northeast again into Hillside, heading into more urbanized settings. In Hillside, I-78 passes under Conrail Shared Assets Operations' (CSAO) Irvington Industrial Track line and has an eastbound exit and westbound entrance to Winans Avenue.

=== Essex and Hudson counties ===
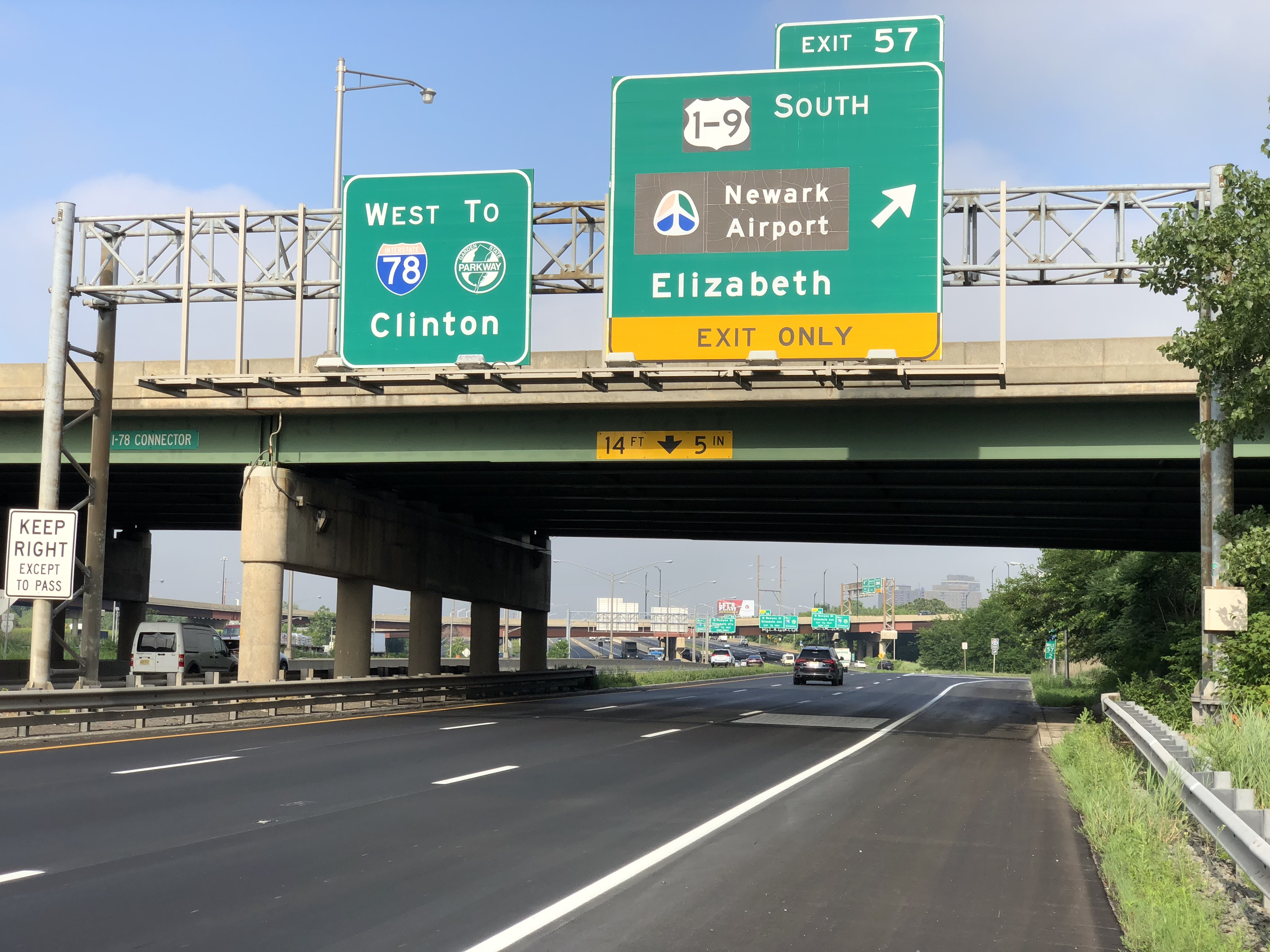
I-78 west at the US 1/9 exit in Newark

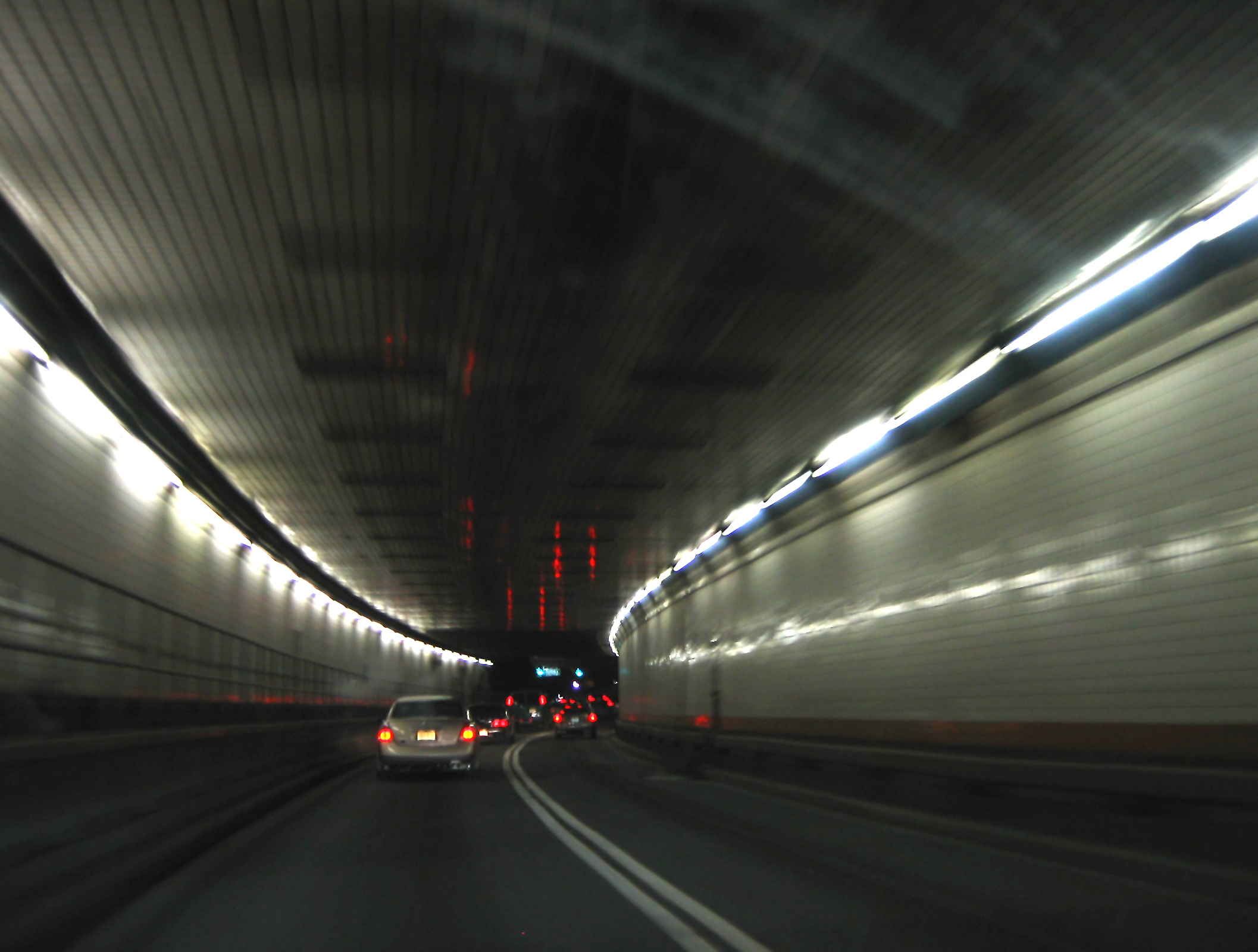
Holland Tunnel westbound leaving Lower Manhattan to Jersey City

I-78 briefly passes through a corner of Irvington in Essex County before continuing into Newark. Upon entering Newark, the road has an interchange serving Lyons Avenue (CR 602) and Wainwright Street. Following this, the freeway passes near urban neighborhoods before coming to exit 56. This large semi-directional T interchange was originally meant to serve the unbuilt Route 75, which would have connected to I-280. The large flyover ramps constructed were converted to exit ramps to Irvine Turner Boulevard with full access to the local and express lanes. Past this, the roadway passes over CSAO's Lehigh Line (which also carries NJ Transit's Raritan Valley Line), Frelinghuysen Avenue (Route 27), and Amtrak's Northeast Corridor. The final interchange on the free part of I-78 is the massive complex to the north of Newark Airport, called the Newark Airport Interchange, with ramps to and from US 1-9, US 22, Route 21, and many local roads. Several ramps provide access to the express lanes. Just to the east, the local and express lanes rejoin at the toll gate for the New Jersey Turnpike, at which point I-78 becomes maintained by the New Jersey Turnpike Authority (NJTA), following the Newark Bay Extension of the New Jersey Turnpike. An interchange just beyond the toll booth provides full access to I-95, the mainline of the New Jersey Turnpike. I-78 here becomes a four-lane highway, heading over the New Jersey Turnpike and CSAO's Chemical Coast Secondary and Corbin Street Lead lines before passing by the Port Newark–Elizabeth Marine Terminal.

I-78 crosses the Newark Bay on the Newark Bay Bridge into Bayonne, Hudson County. As it enters Jersey City, exit 14A, numbered as part of the New Jersey Turnpike, provides access to Route 440. Within this interchange, the road passes over CSAO's Bayonne Industrial Track and Greenville Industrial Track lines. From here, the freeway turns northeast on an elevated alignment and passes industrial areas of Jersey City, with CSAO's National Docks Branch line parallel to the northwest. The next interchange, exit 14B, is for Bayview Avenue and provides access to Liberty State Park. After this interchange, I-78 comes to exit 14C, the number given to the toll plaza at the end of the turnpike extension. After the toll plaza, there is an exit for a park and ride lot at the Liberty State Park Station along NJ Transit's Hudson–Bergen Light Rail line. Continuing north, the road passes over the Hudson–Bergen Light Rail line before there is an exit for Columbus Drive and Montgomery Street. Past this interchange, the highway crosses PATH's Newark–World Trade Center line. I-78 heads down to surface level and passes over CSAO's National Docks Branch line twice before it merges with Route 139.

From here, I-78 and Route 139 pass through business areas as a one-way pair that follows six-lane 12th Street eastbound and six-lane 14th Street westbound. This segment of the route is under the jurisdiction of the Port Authority of New York and New Jersey (PANYNJ) and is also known as Boyle Plaza. It runs on surface streets with traffic lights, an example of a surface section of the Interstate Highway. The first intersection is with Jersey Avenue (CR 631), which heads to Downtown Jersey City and Hoboken. It intersects with the one-way northbound Erie Street (CR 633) next before crossing one-way southbound Grove Street (CR 635). After Grove Street (CR 635), the road crosses the intersection of Marin Boulevard (CR 637) near Newport Centre just to the south. Past this intersection, the eastbound direction comes to the toll gantry for the Holland Tunnel. From here, the concurrency enters the Holland Tunnel under the Hudson River, which carries two lanes in each direction. Route 139 ends at the New Jersey–New York state line within the tunnel and I-78 continues into the New York City borough of Manhattan.

== History ==
The proposed logo for Route 11, which was planned in 1927 but ultimately never built

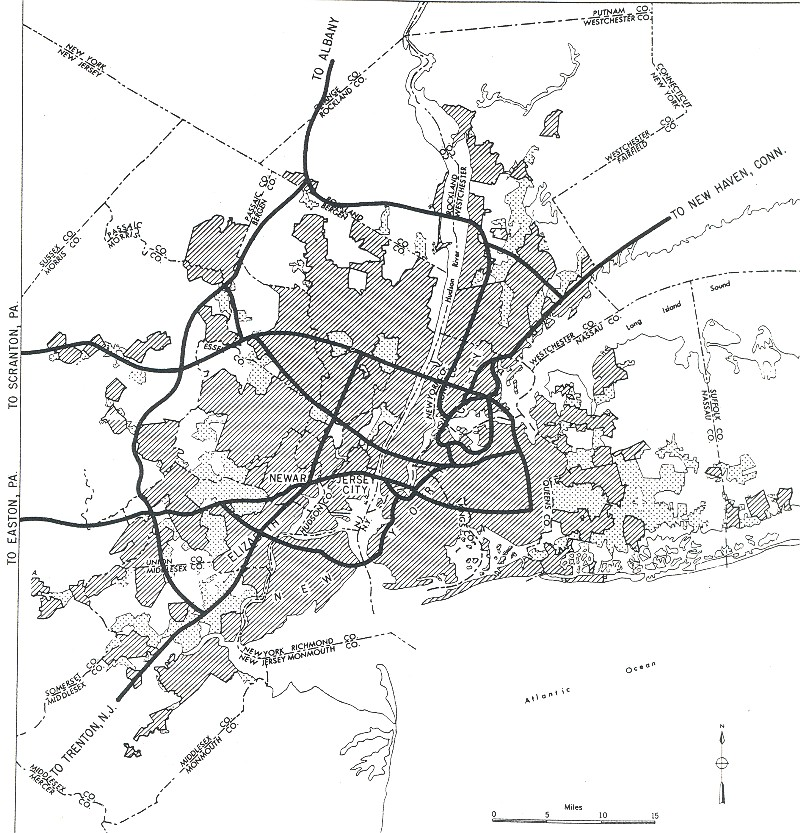
A 1955 plan showing the full proposed route of I-78 in the New York metropolitan area, running east to John F. Kennedy International Airport in Queens and then north to the Bruckner Interchange

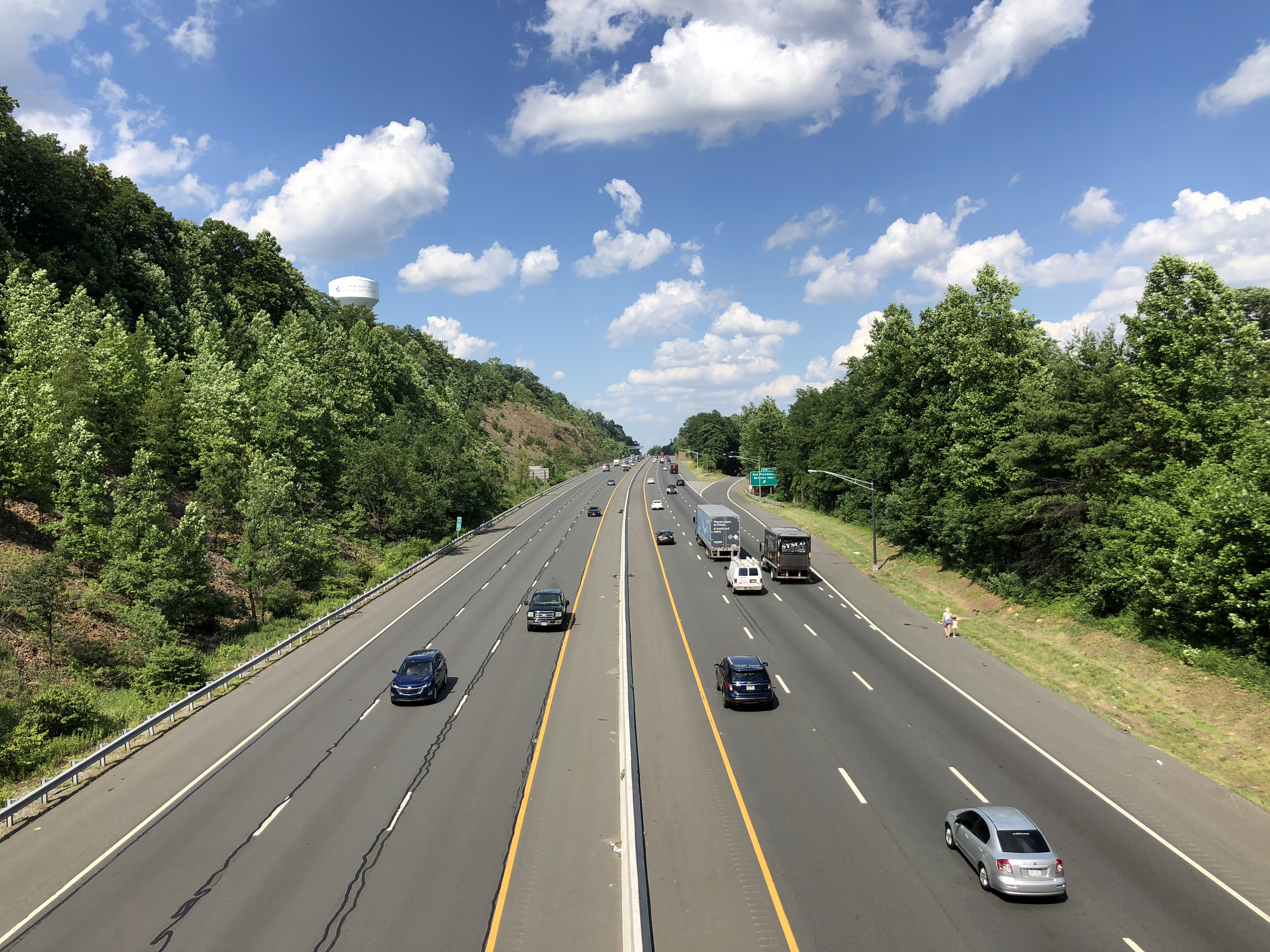
I-78 east in Berkeley Heights

The oldest section of I-78, the Holland Tunnel, was built in September 1927. The tunnel pre-dated the Interstate Highway System, as a commuter route linking Jersey City, New Jersey, and Lower Manhattan. Six months after it was opened, 3.66 million passengers had used the tunnel. In 1927, Route 11 had legislatively approved as a high-speed bypass of US 22, running from Route 28 in Whitehouse east to Route 29 in Warren Township, roughly following the alignment of present-day I-78; it was never built.

The Newark Bay Extension of the New Jersey Turnpike was the first limited-access section of I-78 to be built in the state of New Jersey. The 8.2-mile-long (13.2 km) expressway was opened in 1956 to provide access from the New Jersey Turnpike mainline to the Holland Tunnel. At this time, the Interstate Highway System was established and a route was planned to run east–west from the Harrisburg, Pennsylvania, area to New York City, running across the northern part of New Jersey from Phillipsburg to Jersey City along the US 22 corridor. This freeway was originally planned as FAI Corridor 102 and I-80 before it became I-78 in 1958.

The part of I-78 between exit 3 and exit 13 opened in the 1960s; this segment runs concurrently with US 22, and the old alignment of US 22 became Route 173. In building the road between Pattenburg Road (CR 614) and exit 13, the eastbound lanes of US 22 became westbound I-78 and the westbound lanes of US 22 became the Route 173 frontage road. By 1969, I-78 had also been completed between exit 13 and Martinsville Road (CR 525). In July 1963, Governor Richard J. Hughes approved a plan to build I-78 through the city of Newark at a cost of $205 million (equivalent to $1.65 billion in 2025). This plan had been opposed by several communities along the route. The section of I-78 between Route 24 and the New Jersey Turnpike was completed in the mid-1970s. Along this stretch, exit 56 was to connect to the proposed Route 75 freeway, which was never built.

The section of freeway between Martinsville Road (CR 525) and Drift Road/Dale Road (exit 41) in Watchung was completed in 1974. The section from Drift Road/Dale Road to Route 24 (exit 48) in Springfield was delayed because of environmental impacts to the Watchung Reservation. In order to mitigate opposition to the original plan, that was shifted closer to the northern edge of the reservation, which required extensive cuts into the Second Watchung Mountain. Extra land was added to the Nikesite Road overpass and a separate elevated wildlife crossing was built to allow for animal migration. The road was also designed to use a narrower right-of-way with no median strip and just a jersey barrier dividing the highway, to minimize the amount of rock to be removed. This stretch of I-78 opened in 1986.

A section of I-78 in Newark was closed off in August 1989 when a debris pile under a bridge caught fire and damaged the elevated highway. The road was opened nine days after the fire occurred. The westernmost section of I-78 in New Jersey opened in November 1989 after a more northerly alignment along present day US 22 through Phillipsburg was rejected due to community opposition. This led to I-78 being rerouted to the south of the Lehigh Valley in Pennsylvania and New Jersey. The additional length of roadway that resulted from this rerouting is the reason exit numbers 3 through 52 (which were assigned before this westernmost section opened) are mismatched by approximately one mile (1.6 km) when compared to their corresponding milemarker.

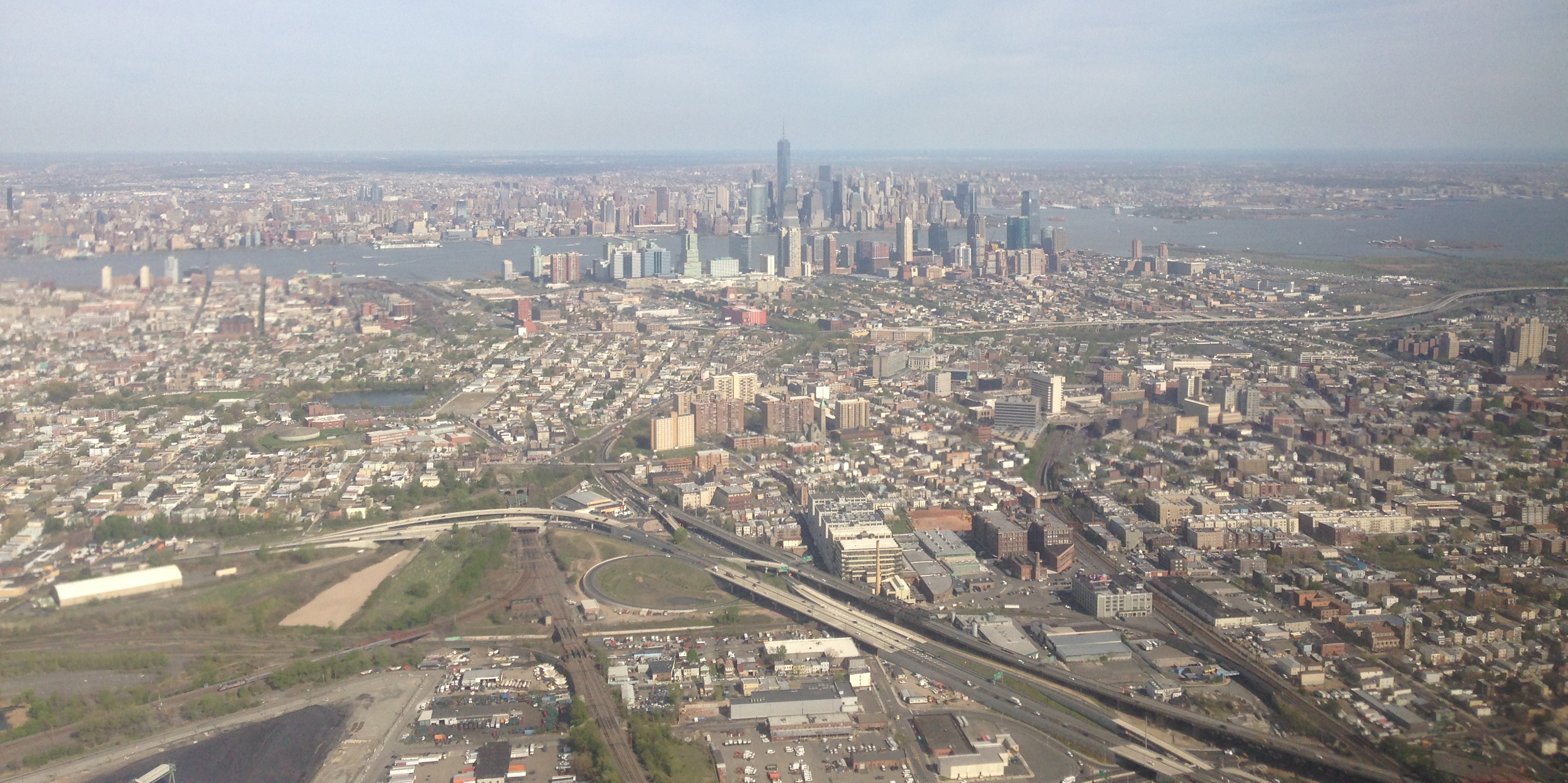
An aerial view of I-78 with Jersey City (in foreground) and Lower Manhattan (in background)

I-78, like many other highways in New Jersey, once had solar powered emergency callboxes every one mile (1.6 km), however, with the advent of cellphones, the usage of these callboxes became extremely limited. To save on maintenance costs, NJDOT removed these call boxes in 2005.

From 2006 to 2007, the highway between Route 24 (exit 48) and the Garden State Parkway (exit 52) was rebuilt. This included redecking of bridge decks and covering the deteriorated concrete pavement with an asphalt overlay. Exit 52 was reconstructed due to missing ramps from the Garden State Parkway and I-78 since the I-287 connection was canceled. Construction began in June 2008, with the ramp from the northbound Garden State Parkway to westbound I-78 being completed in September 2009. The connection between the southbound Garden State Parkway and eastbound I-78 was completed in December 2010. In 2012–2013, the deteriorating concrete surface of I-78 between the Garden State Parkway (exit 52) and US 1/9 and US 22 (exit 57) was resurfaced with an asphalt overlay; this had been the last section of I-78 within New Jersey that was still concrete.

In the early 2020s, the NJTA announced plans to widen its section of I-78, between I-95 and Jersey City, from four to six lanes. Preliminary studies for the project began in 2021; at the time, the project was slated to begin in 2023 and be complete in 2026. The project faced significant opposition from residents of neighboring communities. The project, originally budgeted at $4.7 billion, had increased to $10.6 billion by late 2022. The New Jersey Turnpike Authority tentatively approved some contracts and agreements for the first phase of the widening in March 2025. That December, due to opposition over the widening, Governor Phil Murphy canceled the widening east of exit 14A in Bayonne.

The section of 12th Street east of Marin Boulevard, which carries the eastbound I-78 and Route 139 toward the Holland Tunnel in Jersey City, was narrowed from six to four lanes after open road tolling was implemented at the Holland Tunnel. Subsequently, in 2025, the United States Department of Transportation awarded a $25 million grant to the PANYNJ to narrow the stretch of 12th Street between Jersey Avenue and Marin Boulevard.

== Exit list ==
County	Location	mi	km	Exit	Destinations	Notes
Delaware River		0.00	0.00		I-78 west – Pennsylvania	Continuation into Pennsylvania
Delaware River		0.00	0.00	I-78 Toll Bridge (westbound toll in Pennsylvania)		
Warren	Greenwich Township	3.94	6.34	3	US 22 / Route 122 west / Route 173 east – Phillipsburg, Bloomsbury, Alpha	Western end of US 22 concurrency; signed for Route 122/Alpha westbound, Route 173/Bloomsbury signed westbound; last westbound exit before toll
Warren	Greenwich Township	5.48	8.82	4	Warren Glen, Stewartsville	Westbound exit and eastbound entrance; access via CR 637
Warren	Franklin Township	7.03	11.31	6	Warren Glen, Asbury, Weigh station	Eastbound exit and westbound entrance; access via CR 632
Hunterdon	Bloomsbury	7.46	12.01	7	Route 173 – West Portal, Bloomsbury	
Hunterdon	Union Township	11.76	18.93	11	Route 173 / CR 614 south – West Portal, Pattenburg	CR 614 not signed
Hunterdon	Union Township	13.42	21.60	12	Route 173 / CR 625 south / CR 635 north – Jutland, Norton	CR 625/CR 635 not signed
Hunterdon	Union Township	15.01– 15.07	24.16– 24.25	13	Route 173 west (Service Road)	Western end of Route 173 concurrency; westbound exit and eastbound entrance; former routing of US 22
Hunterdon	Franklin Township	16.06	25.85	15	Route 173 east (CR 513) – Clinton, Pittstown	Eastern end of Route 173 concurrency
Hunterdon	Clinton Township	17.32– 17.87	27.87– 28.76	17	Route 31 – Clinton, Washington, Flemington, Trenton	Signed as exits 16 (north) and 17 (south) eastbound
Hunterdon	Clinton Township	18.34– 18.53	29.52– 29.82	18	US 22 east – Annandale, Lebanon	Eastern end of US 22 concurrency; US 22/Lebanon not signed westbound
Hunterdon	Lebanon	20.78	33.44	20	Lebanon, Round Valley Recreation Area, Cokesbury	Westbound exit and eastbound entrance; access via CR 639; signed as exits 20A (Lebanon) and 20B (Cokesbury)
Hunterdon	Tewksbury Township	25.03	40.28	24	CR 523 to CR 517 – Oldwick, Whitehouse	
Somerset	Bedminster	27.11	43.63	26	CR 665 – Lamington, North Branch	Former CR 523 Spur
Somerset	Bedminster	30.80– 30.87	49.57– 49.68	29	I-287 to I-80 / US 202 / US 206 – Morristown, Somerville	Exits 21A-B on I-287
Somerset	Bernards–Warren township line	34.58	55.65	33	CR 525 – Bernardsville, Martinsville	
Somerset	Warren Township	37.39	60.17	36	CR 651 – Basking Ridge, Warren Township	
Somerset	Warren Township	40.98	65.95	40	CR 531 – The Plainfields, Watchung, Gillette	
Somerset	Watchung	42.22	67.95	41	Berkeley Heights, Scotch Plains	No eastbound entrance; access via Drift Road
Union	Berkeley Heights	44.01	70.83	43	Berkeley Heights, Watchung, New Providence	Access via CR 655
Union	Berkeley Heights	44.52	71.65	44	New Providence, Berkeley Heights	Eastbound exit and entrance; access via CR 527
Union	Summit	46.72	75.19	45	CR 527 (Glenside Avenue) – Summit	Eastbound exit and westbound entrance
Union	Springfield Township	48.14	77.47	Western terminus of local–express lanes		
Union	Springfield Township	49.28	79.31	48	Route 24 west to I-287 – Millburn, Springfield Township, Morristown	Eastern terminus of Route 24; signed for I-287/Springfield/Morristown westbound, Millburn eastbound
Union	Union Township	50.58	81.40	49	Route 124 to Route 82 – Springfield Township, Union Township, Maplewood	Eastbound exit and westbound entrance; signed as exits 49A (west) and 49B (east)
Union	Union Township	51.43	82.77	50	Union Township, Millburn, Maplewood	Westbound exit and eastbound entrance; access via CR 630; signed as exits 50A (Union) and 50B (Millburn/Maplewood)
Union	Union Township–Hillside line	53.11	85.47	52	G.S. Parkway	Exits 142A–B on Garden State Parkway
Union	Hillside	54.32	87.42	54	Hillside, Irvington	Eastbound exit and westbound entrance; access via Winans Avenue
Essex	Newark	54.88– 55.00	88.32– 88.51	55	Hillside, Irvington	Westbound exit and eastbound entrance; access via CR 602
Essex	Newark	56.45	90.85	56	West Peddie Street / Elizabeth Avenue – Downtown Newark	Exit from both express and local lanes; no westbound access to West Peddie Street; Downtown not signed eastbound
Essex	Newark	57.23	92.10	57	Route 21 north – Newark, Newark Liberty International Airport	No westbound exit; southern terminus of Route 21
Essex	Newark	57.45	92.46	57	US 1-9 south – Newark Liberty International Airport, Elizabeth	No eastbound exit
Essex	Newark	58.03– 58.32	93.39– 93.86	58	US 1-9 to US 22 west / Route 21 north – Port Newark, Elizabeth, Newark, Newark Airport, North Area, South Area	Signed as exits 58A (south) and 58B (north); exit numbers not signed westbound; last eastbound exit before toll
Essex	Newark	58.03– 58.32	93.39– 93.86	Eastern terminus of local–express lanes; western end of N.J. Turnpike Newark Bay Extension		
Essex	Newark	58.60	94.31	Exit 14 Toll Plaza (western end of ticket system)		
Essex	Newark	58.93	94.84	–	I-95 Toll / N.J. Turnpike	Exit 14 on I-95 / Turnpike
Newark Bay		60.80	97.85	Newark Bay Bridge		
Hudson	Jersey City	62.01	99.80	14A	Route 185 north / Route 440 – Bayonne	Access via Port Jersey Boulevard; Route 185 not signed; access to Cape Liberty Cruise Port and Staten Island
Hudson	Jersey City	64.20	103.32	14B	Jersey City, Liberty State Park	Access via Bayview Avenue
Hudson	Jersey City	64.50	103.80	Exit 14C Toll Plaza (eastern end of ticket system)		
Hudson	Jersey City	64.60	103.96	–	Liberty Science Center, Light Rail Park-Ride	Eastbound exit and westbound entrance; access via Jersey City Boulevard
Hudson	Jersey City	65.50	105.41	–	Columbus Drive	Eastbound exit and westbound entrance
Hudson	Jersey City	66.49	107.01	–	Route 139 west to I-280 / US 1-9 (Pulaski Skyway)	Western end of Route 139 concurrency; westbound exit and eastbound entrance
Hudson	Jersey City	66.76	107.44	Eastern end of freeway section and N.J. Turnpike Newark Bay Extension; continues as at-grade one-way pair (westbound as 14th Street; eastbound as 12th Street)		
Hudson	Jersey City	66.76	107.44		Jersey Avenue (CR 631) – Lincoln Tunnel	Signalized intersection
Hudson	Jersey City	66.85	107.58		Erie Street north (CR 633)	Signalized intersection
Hudson	Jersey City	66.94	107.73		Grove Street south (CR 635)	Signalized intersection
Hudson	Jersey City	67.03	107.87		Marin Boulevard (CR 637)	Signalized intersection; no westbound access to Marin Boulevard south
Hudson River		67.83	109.16		Holland Tunnel (eastbound toll; E-ZPass or toll-by-plate)	
Hudson River		67.83	109.16		I-78 east – New York City Route 139 ends	Continuation into New York at the river's center; eastern terminus of Route 139
1.000 mi = 1.609 km; 1.000 km = 0.621 mi: Concurrency terminus; Incomplete access; Tolled

== See also ==
Interstate 78
Previous state: Pennsylvania	New Jersey	Next state: New York
