= West Portal, New Jersey =

Populated place in Hunterdon County, New Jersey, US

- Unincorporated community
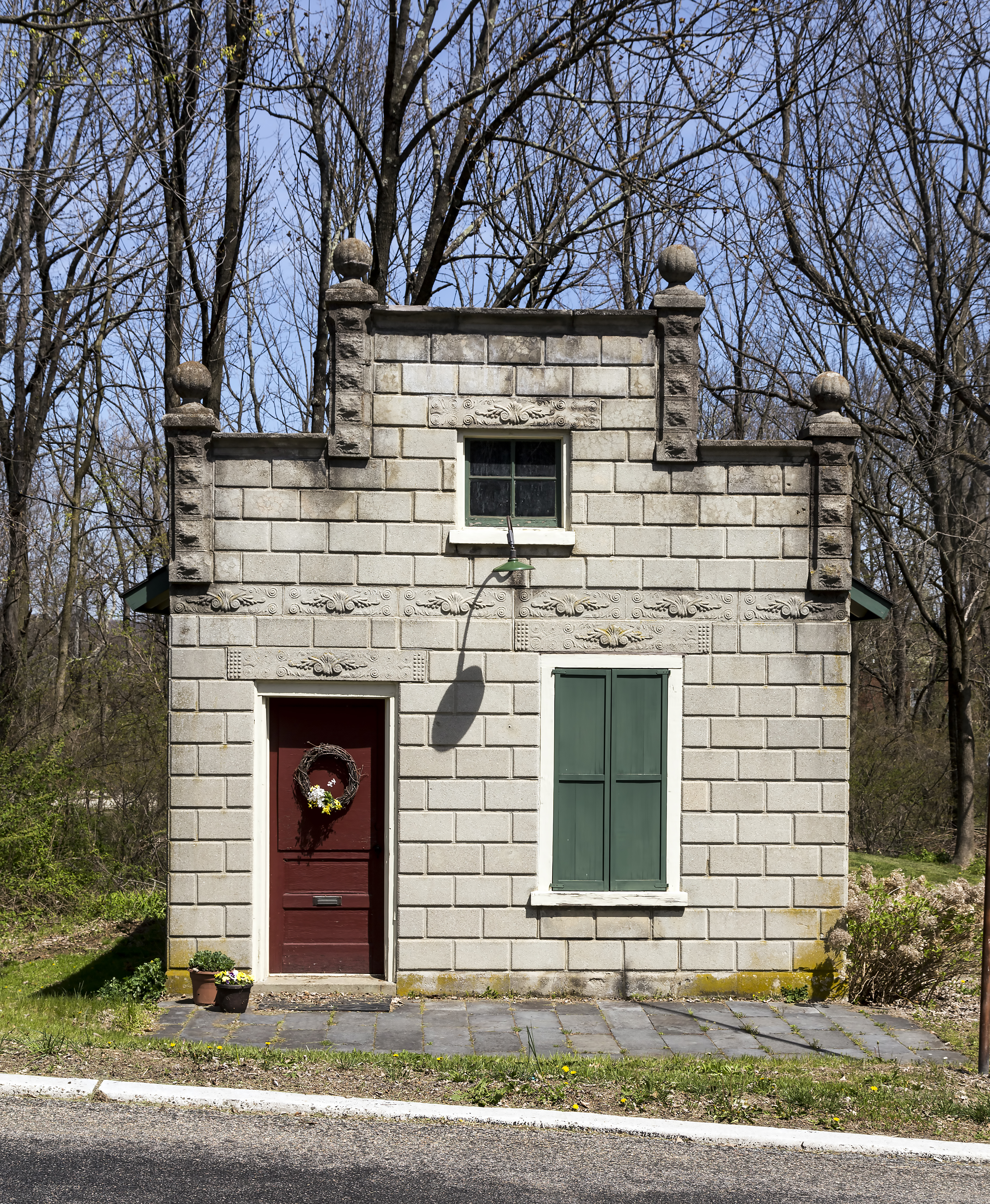
- The old town hall, West Portal in 2016

- West Portal's location in Hunterdon County (Inset: Hunterdon County in New Jersey) West Portal, New Jersey (New Jersey) West Portal, New Jersey (the United States)
- Coordinates: 40°39′44″N 75°2′0″W
- Country: United States
- State: New Jersey
- County: Hunterdon
- Township: Bethlehem
- Elevation: 436 ft (133 m)
- Time zone: UTC−05:00 (Eastern (EST))
  - Summer (DST): UTC−04:00 (EDT)
- GNIS feature ID: 881725

West Portal is an unincorporated community located within Bethlehem Township in Hunterdon County, in the U.S. state of New Jersey.

The community is centered at the intersection of Route 173 and County Route 643, approximately 5.1 miles (8.2 km) southwest of Hampton.

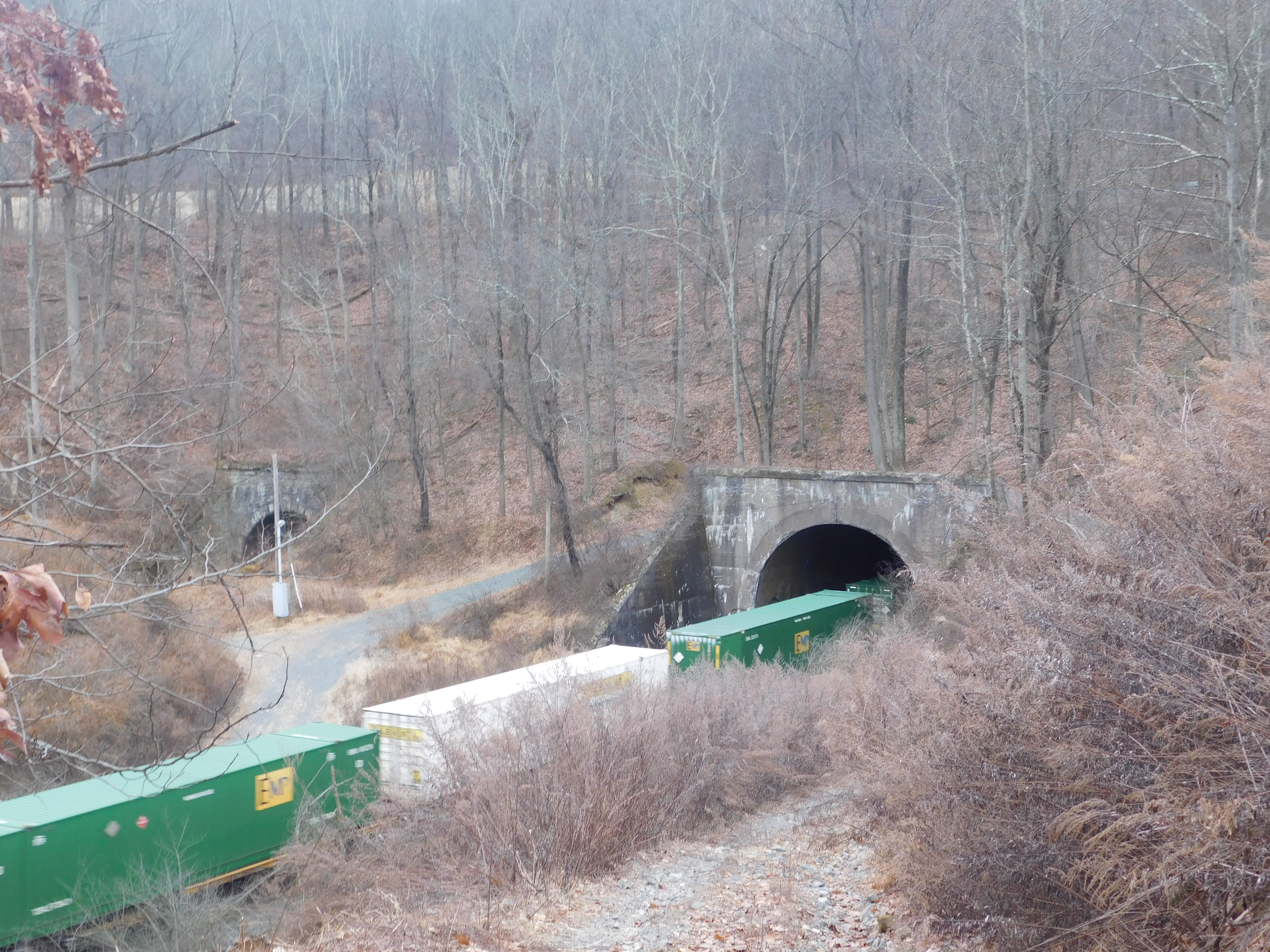
The namesake West Portal of the Pattenburg Tunnel

The Norfolk Southern Railway's Lehigh Line (formerly the mainline of the Lehigh Valley Railroad), runs through West Portal and Lehigh Line's north entrance to the Pattenburg Tunnel (which goes underneath Musconetcong Mountain) is located in West Portal.
