= New Jersey Route 173 =

State highway in Warren and Hunterdon counties in New Jersey, United States

Route 173

Route information
- Maintained by NJDOT
- Length: 14.62 mi (23.53 km)
- Existed: 1969–present

Major junctions
- West end: I-78 / US 22 / Route 122 in Greenwich Township
- CR 579 in Greenwich Township; I-78 / US 22 / CR 513 in Franklin Township
- East end: Route 31 / CR 626 in Clinton Township

Location
- Country: United States
- State: New Jersey
- Counties: Warren, Hunterdon

Highway system
- New Jersey State Highway Routes; Interstate; US; State; Scenic Byways
← Route 172	→ Route 174

Route 173 is a state highway in New Jersey, United States that is a designation for an old section of U.S. Route 22 (US 22). The route runs 14.62 mi (23.53 km) from Interstate 78 (I-78) and US 22 in Pohatcong Township, Warren County to County Route 626 (CR 626, Beaver Avenue) in Clinton Township, Hunterdon County, just east of an interchange with Route 31. Route 173 parallels I-78 and US 22 for its entire length through rural areas of Warren and Hunterdon counties, passing through the towns of Bloomsbury and Clinton along the way. At one point just to the west of Clinton, Route 173 runs concurrent with I-78 and US 22.

The route was originally part of pre-1927 Route 9 from 1916 until 1927, when it became part of US 22 and Route 28. The Route 28 designation was removed from this portion of road in 1953. When I-78 was being built between exits 11 and 13 in the 1950s and 1960s, it was decided that part of US 22 would be used for the new highway. The eastbound lanes of US 22 became the westbound lanes of the new highway, the eastbound lanes of the new highway were newly constructed, and the westbound lanes of US 22 were turned into a two-lane road. In 1969, US 22 was moved to the alignment of I-78 between Pohatcong Township and Clinton Township and Route 173 was designated along most of the former alignment of US 22.

== Route description ==
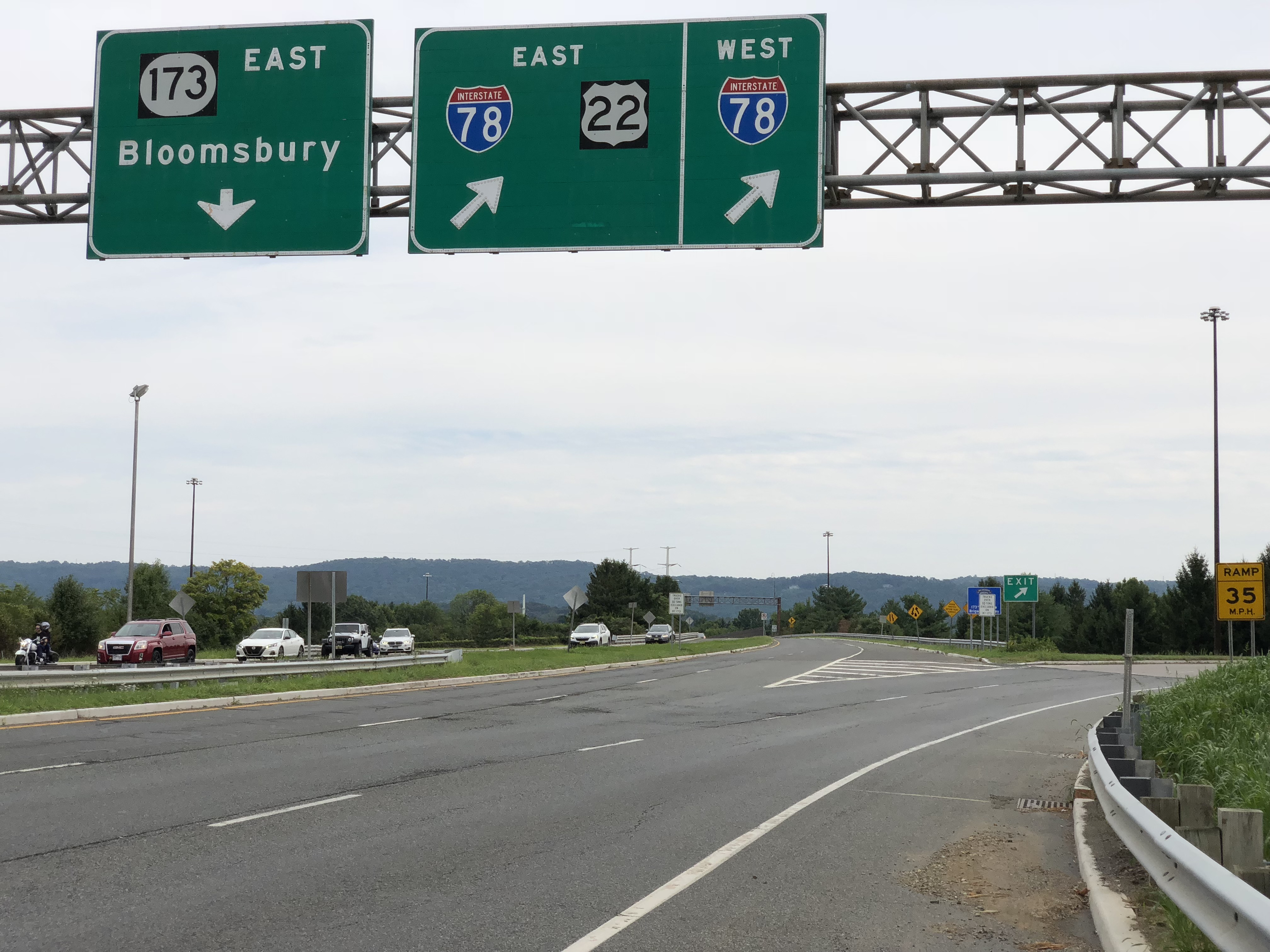
View east at the western terminus of Route 173 at US 22 and I-78 in Pohatcong Township

Route 173 begins at an interchange with Interstate 78 and U.S. Route 22 in Pohatcong Township, Warren County, where the route continues to the northwest as part of U.S. Route 22, a six-lane, divided highway that heads towards Phillipsburg. From this interchange, Route 173 heads east on a two-lane, undivided road that parallels Interstate 78/U.S. Route 22 to the south, immediately entering Greenwich Township and passing through farmland and some suburban residential developments. County Route 644 (Greenwich Church Road) loops to the north of Route 173 as the route features three crossings of the Pohatcong Creek. Route 173 intersects County Route 637 (Main Street/Maple Drive), County Route 639 (Warren Glen Road), and the northern terminus of County Route 579 (Church Street). Past the County Route 579 intersection, the route parallels the Musconetcong River and intersects County Route 632 (Asbury Road), which provides access to westbound Interstate 78/U.S. Route 22.

Route 173 crosses the Musconetcong River into Bloomsbury, Hunterdon County. It comes to another interchange with Interstate 78/U.S. Route 22, where Route 173 takes on the name Brunswick Pike and closely parallels the interstate to the north. The route enters Bethlehem Township and passes under Norfolk Southern's Central Running Track line, continuing east through farmland The route parallels Norfolk Southern's Lehigh Line for a short distance, running farther to the north of Interstate 78/U.S. Route 22, before intersecting County Route 643 (West Portal–Asbury Road). Past this intersection, Route 173 heads south and then east through the Musconetcong Mountains as a five-lane road with a center left-turn lane. The route crosses into Union Township, where it becomes Old Highway 22. The route becomes a divided highway and meets County Route 614 (Little York Road) at a traffic circle near an interchange with Interstate 78/U.S. Route 22. Route 173 has direct ramps to and from the westbound direction of the interstate with access to and from the eastbound direction provided by way of County Route 614. Route 173 narrows back to a two-lane, undivided road and closely follows Interstate 78/U.S. Route 22 to the north, meeting County Route 625 (Mechlin Corner Road) and County Route 635 (Charlestown Road) near another interchange with Interstate 78/U.S. Route 22. There is direct access to and from the westbound direction of Interstate 78/U.S. Route 22 while access to and from the eastbound direction of Interstate 78/U.S. Route 22 is provided by County Route 625. The route continues east and splits into a one-way pair. At this point, eastbound Route 173 crosses over Interstate 78/U.S. Route 22 and makes a left turn to merge onto eastbound Interstate 78/U.S. Route 22. The westbound direction of Route 173 splits from Interstate 78/U.S. Route 22 and continues west to join back with eastbound Route 173.

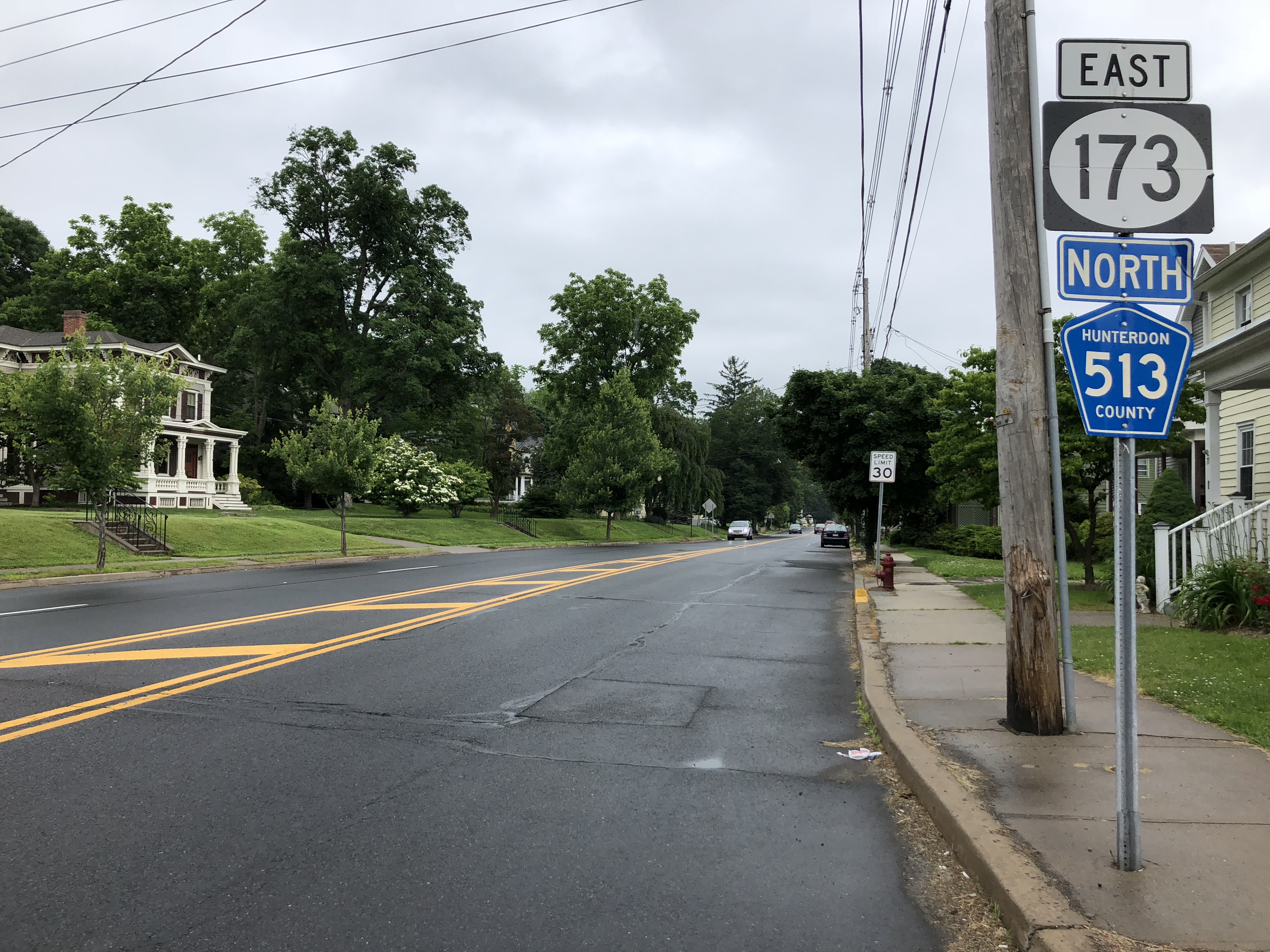
Route 173 heading eastbound concurrent with CR 513 in Clinton

Route 173 follows Interstate 78/U.S. Route 22 for a little over a mile in Franklin Township until an interchange County Route 513 (Pittstown Road), where the eastbound direction merges onto this route and heads into Clinton. It meets the westbound direction of Route 173, which splits at this point and heads west on West Main Street to merge into westbound Interstate 78/U.S. Route 22 in Union Township. In Clinton, Route 173 crosses over the South Branch Raritan River and splits from County Route 513 where that route heads north on Leigh Street. The route crosses into Clinton Township and it features ramps connecting to Interstate 78/U.S. Route 22, with access from westbound Route 173 to westbound Interstate 78/U.S. Route 22 and from eastbound Interstate 78/U.S. Route 22 to eastbound Route 173. Route 173 turns north to interchange with Route 31 and end at County Route 626 (Beaver Avenue).

== History ==
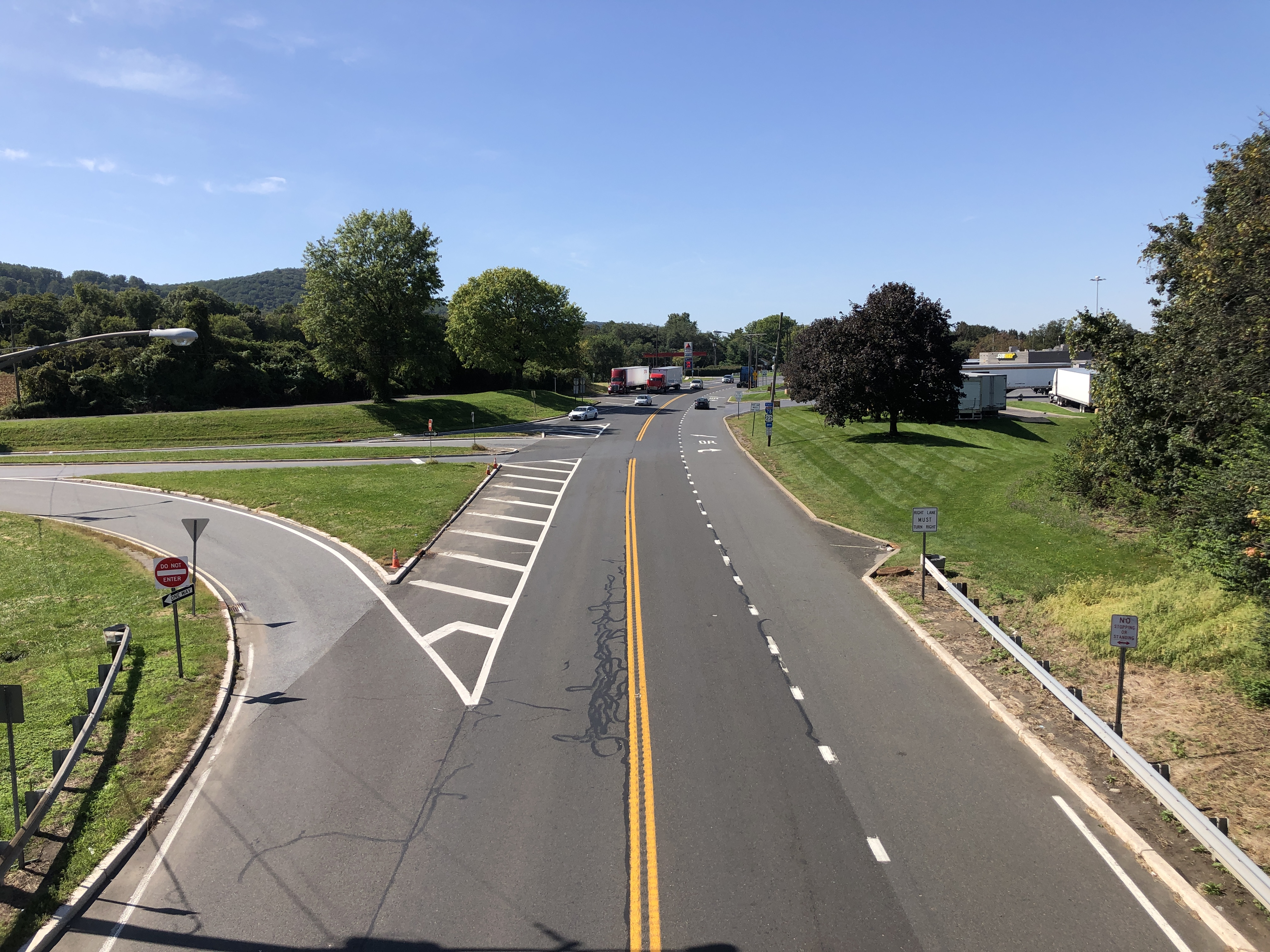
Route 173 westbound at the I-78/US 22 interchange in Bloomsbury

Prior to 1927, Route 173 was part of Pre-1927 Route 9, which was designated in 1917 to run from Phillipsburg to Elizabeth. In the 1927 New Jersey state highway renumbering, the route became Route 28. In addition, it was also designated as part of U.S. Route 22. In the 1953 New Jersey state highway renumbering, which eliminated long concurrencies between U.S. and State Routes, the Route 28 designation was removed along this portion of the route, leaving U.S. Route 22 the sole number along the route. In the late 1950s, construction began on Interstate 78 through the area. Construction of the portion of Interstate 78 built between Exit 11 (County Route 614) and Exit 13 in Union Township, completed in 1962, modified the alignment of U.S. Route 22 between these two points. It involved the creation of new eastbound lanes for Interstate 78 and conversion of the eastbound lanes of U.S. Route 22 into the westbound lanes of Interstate 78. The westbound lanes of U.S. Route 22 were turned into a two-lane frontage road. In 1969, U.S. Route 22 was moved to the Interstate 78 alignment between Exit 3 in Pohatcong Township and Exit 18 in Clinton Township. The former U.S. Route 22 became Route 173 between Exit 3 and Route 31 in Clinton Township, with the remainder of the former U.S. Route 22 alignment becoming county-maintained Beaver Avenue (currently County Route 626).

== Major intersections ==
County	Location	mi	km	Destinations	Notes
Warren	Greenwich Township	0.00	0.00	US 22 west / Route 122 west – Phillipsburg, Bloomsbury	Western terminus; eastern terminus of Route 122
Warren	Greenwich Township			I-78 / US 22 east – Pennsylvania, New York	Westbound exit and eastbound entrance; exit 3 on I-78
Warren	Greenwich Township	2.86	4.60	CR 579 south (Church Street)	Northern terminus of CR 579
Hunterdon	Bloomsbury	3.94	6.34	I-78 / US 22 to N.J. Turnpike (I-95)	Exit 7 on I-78
Hunterdon	Union Township	8.37	13.47	I-78 / US 22 / CR 614 south (Little York Road)	Roundabout; northern terminus of CR 614; exit 11 on I-78
Hunterdon	Union Township	10.02	16.13	I-78 / US 22 / CR 625 south (Mechlin Corner Road) / CR 635 north (Charlestown Road) – Norton, Jutland	Northern terminus of CR 625; southern terminus of CR 635; exit 12 on I-78
Hunterdon	Union Township	11.70	18.83	I-78 west / US 22 west	West end of I-78/US 22 overlap; exit 13 on I-78
Hunterdon	Franklin Township	12.81	20.62	I-78 east / US 22 east	East end of I-78/US 22 overlap; exit 15 on I-78
Hunterdon	Franklin Township	12.98	20.89	CR 513 south (Pittstown Road) – Pittstown	West end of CR 513 overlap
Hunterdon	Clinton	13.70	22.05	CR 513 north (Leigh Street)	East end of CR 513 overlap
Hunterdon	Clinton Township	14.32	23.05	I-78 west / US 22 west	Westbound exit and eastbound entrance; exit 16 on I-78
Hunterdon	Clinton Township	14.55	23.42	Route 31	Interchange
Hunterdon	Clinton Township	14.62	23.53	CR 626 (Beaver Avenue)	Eastern terminus
1.000 mi = 1.609 km; 1.000 km = 0.621 mi: Concurrency terminus; Incomplete access
