= County Route 513 (New Jersey) =

County highway in New Jersey, U.S.

County Route 513
- CR 513 highlighted in red

Route information
- Length: 66.83 mi (107.55 km)
- Existed: 1952–present

Major junctions
- South end: Route 12 in Frenchtown
- I-78 / US 22 / Route 173 in Franklin Township; Route 31 in Clinton Township; US 206 in Chester; Route 10 in Randolph; US 46 in Rockaway Township; I-80 in Rockaway Township; Route 23 in Jefferson Township
- North end: CR 511 in West Milford

Location
- Country: United States
- State: New Jersey
- Counties: Hunterdon, Morris, Passaic

Highway system
- County routes in New Jersey; 500-series routes
← CR 512	→ CR 514

County Route 513 (CR 513) is a county highway in the U.S. state of New Jersey. The highway extends 66.83 miles (107.55 km) from Kingwood Avenue (Route 12) in Frenchtown to Lakeside Road (CR 511) in West Milford. South of Frenchtown, the road continues as Route 29. It is the third longest county route in New Jersey, following CR 519 and CR 527.

== Route description ==
=== Hunterdon County ===
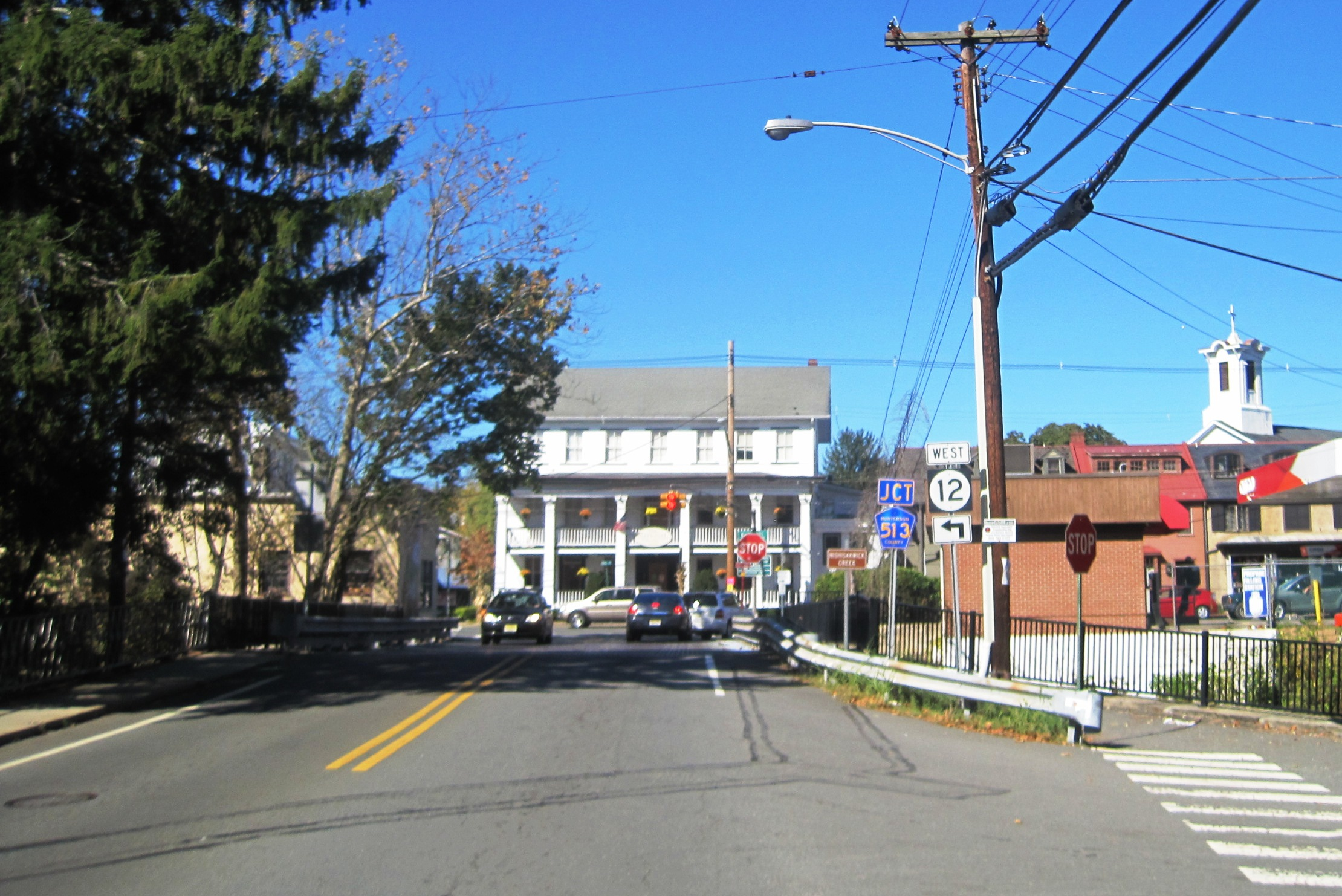
Southern terminus of CR 513 in Frenchtown

CR 513 begins at an intersection with Route 12 in Frenchtown, Hunterdon County, a short distance to the north of the northern terminus of Route 29. From this point, the road heads north on two-lane undivided Everittstown Road, passing homes. The route continues into Alexandria Township and enters more rural areas of farms and woods with some residences. CR 513 heads north into more agricultural areas before making a turn to the east and coming to the CR 519 intersection. After this, the roadway continues through more rural areas with some residential subdivisions, intersecting CR 625. Following a turn to the northeast and back to the east, CR 513 comes to an intersection with CR 579. Here, the road turns northeast and forms a brief concurrency with that route as it passes a few businesses in the community of Pittstown, running along the border between Alexandria Township to the west and Franklin Township to the east as Pittstown Road. After CR 579 splits by heading to the northwest, CR 513 continues northeast back into a mix of farms and woods with a few areas of homes, forming the border between Union Township to the west and Franklin Township to the east. The road passes over Norfolk Southern's Lehigh Line before coming to an intersection with CR 617.

Following this intersection, CR 513 enters more developed areas, passing between the Hunterdon Developmental Center to the west and businesses to the east. Upon reaching an interchange with I-78/US 22/Route 173, CR 513 forms a concurrency with Route 173 and the two routes head into Clinton on Old Highway 22, passing several homes. After crossing the South Branch Raritan River, the road enters commercial areas and CR 513 splits from Route 173 by turning northwest onto Leigh Street. The route continues past homes and businesses, becoming Halstead Street at another crossing of the South Branch Raritan River. The road passes more residences before entering Clinton Township and reaching Route 31. At this point, CR 513 continues north along Route 31, a four-lane divided highway that passes to the east of the Spruce Run Reservoir and runs near businesses.

Past the reservoir, CR 513 splits from Route 31 and continues east on two-lane undivided West Main Street, entering residential areas. The road curves northeast and heads into High Bridge, where it turns north again. The route turns east onto Bridge Street and passes under New Jersey Transit’s Raritan Valley Line at the High Bridge station. After this, CR 513 makes a turn to the north onto Main Street and passes through the commercial downtown area. The route briefly heads east on Church Street before turning north onto Fairview Avenue and entering residential areas. The road heads into Lebanon Township and enters more mountainous and forested areas as it passes near Voorhees State Park. The route passes a mix of woods and homes as it intersects CR 628 and turns northeast, continuing through areas of farms, trees, and homes in a narrow valley. The roadway forms the border between Lebanon Township to the northwest and Califon to the southeast as it passes businesses and intersects the western terminus of CR 512. Past the CR 512 intersection, CR 513 fully enters Califon and continues past homes and commercial establishments. Upon entering Lebanon Township again, the road continues north through farmland and woodland with a few developments.

=== Morris and Passaic counties ===
CR 513 continues into Washington Township in Morris County and becomes West Mill Road. The route heads north through more rural areas with some homes prior to making a turn to the northeast and runs between woods to the northwest and farms to the southeast. The road reaches the community of Long Valley, where it crosses CR 517. At this point, CR 513 heads east on East Mill Road and is signed as a part of former Route 24, which follows CR 517 to the north past Long Valley. The road passes some homes and businesses prior to continuing into a mix of farms and woods and reaching the CR 625 junction. Farther east, CR 513 enters more forested areas with homes and continues into Chester Township. The road passes near fields before crossing into Chester Borough and becoming Main Street. In Chester, CR 513 passes businesses as it widens to four lanes and reaches an intersection with US 206. After this point, the route turns northeast as a two-lane road and runs through the commercial downtown before heading east into residential areas. At the intersection with the western terminus of CR 510, CR 513 splits from Main Street and the former Route 24 designation and heads northeast onto North Road. The route continues back into Chester Township and heads back into rural areas of farms and woods before entering forested residential areas.

Upon crossing Ironia Road, the road enters Randolph Township and becomes Dover-Chester Road. The roadway passes more suburban neighborhoods as it turns north and crosses CR 617. Heading northeast again, CR 513 passes near the County College of Morris and reaches an intersection with Route 10. Past Route 10, the route passes more homes before reaching the CR 662 intersection, at which point CR 513 turns east onto Quaker Church Road. A short distance later, the route heads northeast onto Reservoir Road and passes a mix of woods and homes. The road enters Dover, at which point the name becomes Prospect Street and it intersects CR 670. CR 513 continues past more homes before passing over New Jersey Transit’s Morristown Line/Montclair-Boonton Line and coming to the CR 659 junction. Here, the county route turns east onto East Blackwell Street and runs through the commercial downtown of Dover. In this area, the road has intersections with CR 643 and CR 665. Farther east, CR 513 passes through homes before entering industrial areas and crossing into Rockaway Township. The route makes a turn north onto Dover-Rockaway Road and passes over the Dover and Rockaway River Railroad's Dover and Rockaway Branch before heading past residences and reaching the US 46 intersection.

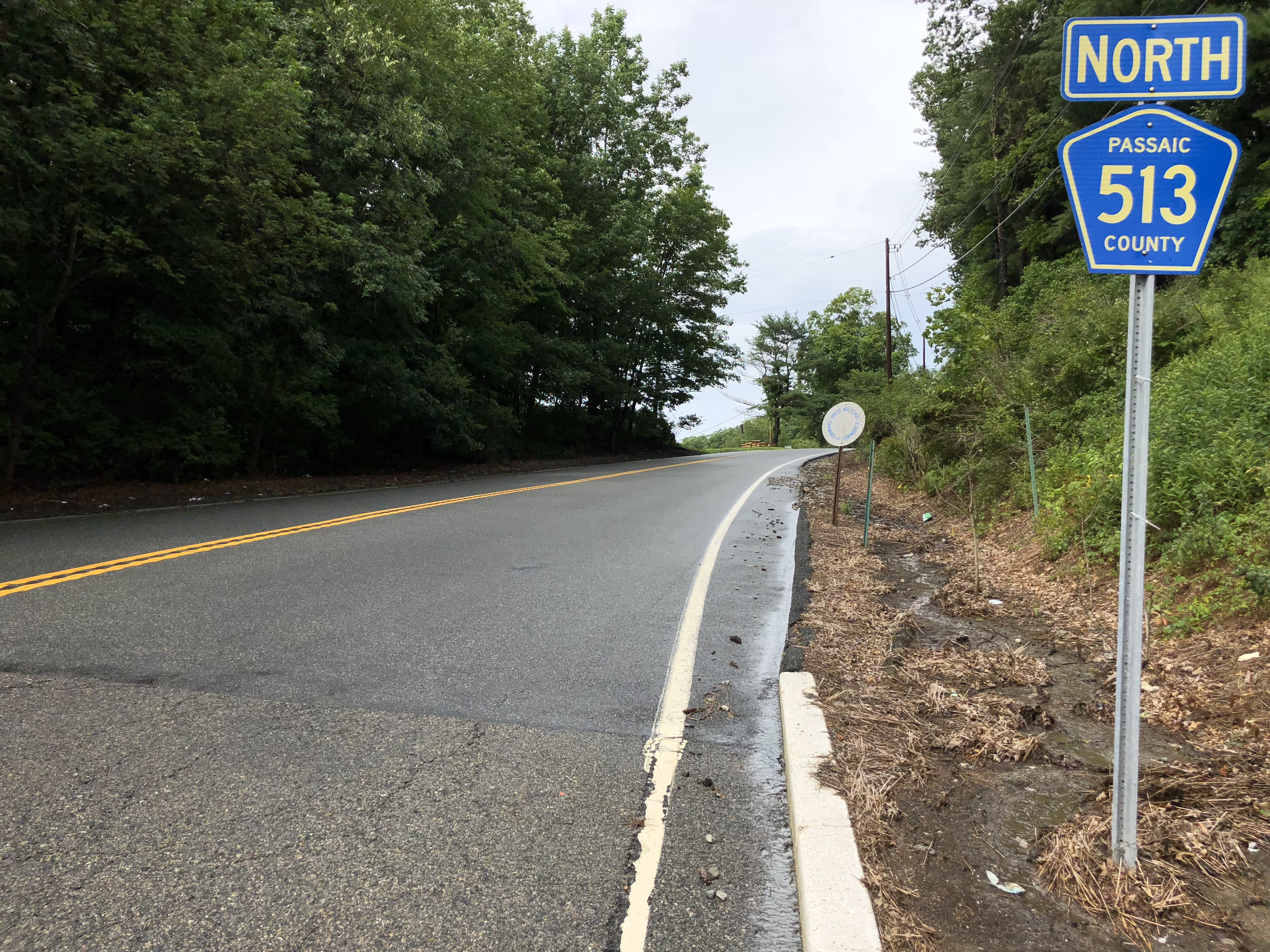
CR 513 northbound past Route 23 in West Milford

At this point, CR 513 becomes West Main Street and enters Rockaway, continuing past homes. Upon reaching the commercial center of Rockaway, the route intersects CR 644 and turns north onto Wall Street. A short distance later, CR 664 splits north from CR 513, and the route heads northeast onto Church Street and entering residential areas again. The route turns north onto Halsey Avenue briefly before continuing northeast on Hibernia Avenue. The road enters Rockaway Township again and becomes Green Pond Road as it immediately reaches an interchange with I-80. At this interchange, CR 513 widens into a four-lane road and continues past businesses. The road turns northeast past industrial parks as it narrows back to two lanes and makes a turn to the north, eventually heading into wooded mountains containing a few residences. CR 513 passes through the wooded community of Lake Telemark, at which point the road passes near a couple lakes. The route continues winding to the north through wooded mountains and lakes for several more miles, passing a few residential developments. CR 513 crosses into Jefferson Township and crosses the New York, Susquehanna and Western Railway's New Jersey Subdivision line prior to reaching an intersection with Route 23. At this point, CR 513 turns east to run concurrent with Route 23 on a four-lane divided highway.

Upon crossing the Pequannock River, Route 23/CR 513 enters West Milford in Passaic County and CR 513 splits from Route 23 by turning north onto two-lane undivided Union Valley Road. From here on there are very few signs referring to it as CR 513. The road continues through wooded mountains with a few homes. The route turns more to the northeast with residential development increasing as it comes to the intersection with CR 693. At this intersection, it passes by several homes and businesses in the center of West Milford. CR 513 becomes Union Valley Road again after the junction with CR 696 and continues north, passing to the east of Pinecliff Lake before passing more residences. CR 513 makes a turn to the east and passes more residential and commercial development as it reaches its northern terminus at CR 511, approximately 2.5 miles south of the New York State border.

== History ==
The section running from Long Valley to Chester was originally created as part of the Washington Turnpike, which stretched from Morristown to Philipsburg. This road was later incorporated into the William Penn Highway, which ran from New York to Pittsburgh. This section of road was incorporated into Route 24 in 1927, before being removed by 1992. County Route 513 was designated in 1952.

== Major intersections ==
County	Location	mi	km	Destinations	Notes
Hunterdon	Frenchtown	0.00	0.00	Route 12 (Kingwood Avenue) – Uhlerstown, Baptistown, Flemington	Southern terminus
Hunterdon	Alexandria Township	3.44	5.54	CR 519	
Hunterdon	Alexandria Township	7.43	11.96	CR 579 south – Flemington	Southern end of CR 579 concurrency
Hunterdon	Alexandria Township	7.50	12.07	CR 579 north – Bloomsbury	Northern end of CR 579 concurrency
Hunterdon	Union Township	11.45	18.43	I-78 / US 22 / Route 173 west – Phillipsburg, New York	Southern end of Route 173 concurrency; exit 15 on I-78
Hunterdon	Clinton	12.13	19.52	Route 173 east (Main Street)	Northern end of Route 173 concurrency
Hunterdon	Clinton Township	12.98	20.89	Route 31 south	Southern end of Route 31 concurrency
Hunterdon	Clinton Township	13.64	21.95	Route 31 north – Washington	Northern end of Route 31 concurrency
Hunterdon	Califon	20.23	32.56	CR 512 east (Main Street)	Western terminus of CR 512
Morris	Washington Township	25.85	41.60	CR 517 (Schooleys Mountain Road / Fairmount Road) – Hackettstown, Fairmount	
Morris	Chester Borough	30.32	48.80	US 206 – Netcong, Somerville	
Morris	Chester Borough	31.32	50.40	CR 510 east (Main Street)	Western terminus of CR 510
Morris	Randolph Township	38.71	62.30	Route 10 – Netcong, Hanover	
Morris	Rockaway Township	43.13	69.41	US 46 – Dover, Denville	
Morris	Rockaway Township	45.34	72.97	I-80 – Netcong, Delaware Water Gap, Paterson, New York	Exit 37 on I-80
Morris	Jefferson Township	57.14	91.96	Route 23 north – Sussex	Southern end of Route 23 concurrency
Passaic	West Milford	57.56	92.63	Route 23 south – Butler, Newark	Northern end of Route 23 concurrency
Passaic	West Milford	66.83	107.55	CR 511 (Lakeside Road / Stansby Road) – Ringwood, Greenwood Lake, NY	Northern terminus
1.000 mi = 1.609 km; 1.000 km = 0.621 mi: Concurrency terminus
