= New Jersey Route 75 =

Proposed state highway in Essex County, New Jersey, US

Route 75
- Final intended alignment of Route 75 (1967)

Route information
- Maintained by NJDOT
- Existed: 1961–1997 (never built)
- History: Abandoned April 1972

Major junctions
- West end: US 1-9 in Newark
- US 22 in Newark; I-78 in Newark
- East end: I-280 in Newark; Originally Route 21 in Newark

Location
- Country: United States
- State: New Jersey
- Counties: Essex

Highway system
- New Jersey State Highway Routes; Interstate; US; State; Scenic Byways
← Route 74	→ I-76

Route 75 was a proposed freeway in the U.S. State of New Jersey in the Newark area in the 1960s and 1970s. It was designed to connect the existing Route 21 freeway north of Newark with Interstate 78 (I-78), U.S. Route 1-9 (US 1–9), and Newark Airport. The state of New Jersey applied for interstate status for the route in 1970, but construction of the road remained stalled in courts throughout the 1970s. In 1973, the state of New Jersey and the Federal Highway Administration shelved plans for the route in April 1972, and in 1997, the state of New Jersey officially removed the route from its route logs. Despite its removal, vestiges of Route 75 still remain. The first example is Exit 13 on Interstate 280 eastbound in Newark. The exit is an enormous three lane ramp, while through traffic on I-280 has only two lanes. The ramp comes to a stop at a traffic light on First Street, just south of Orange Street. Also, at Exit 56 off Interstate 78, large flyover ramps meant for a freeway diverge from the roadway, but terminate at city streets.

== Route description ==
The Route 75 Freeway was intended to begin at an interchange with U.S. Route 1 and U.S. Route 9 south of Newark Liberty International Airport. The route was to head to the northwest, crossing an interchange with New Jersey Route 27 (Frelinghuysen Avenue) on the southbound side. The highway would continue, crossing a southbound trumpet interchange with U.S. Route 22, before entering the massive trumpet interchange with Interstate 78. From Interstate 78, Route 75 would head northward directly, interchanging with several local streets in Newark including Runyon, Avon, Kinney and Market on the southbound side and Alpine, Waverly, Court Streets along with Central Avenue (County Route 508) on the northbound side. From Central Avenue, the new freeway would enter the large interchange with Interstate 280 and New Jersey Route 58 and follow current-day Irvine Turner Boulevard into University Heights. From Interstate 280, Route 75 was to interchange with Park Avenue heading northbound before making a bend to the northeast, where it would merge in with Route 21 (the McCarter Highway) just south of Chester Avenue (Exit 4).

== History ==
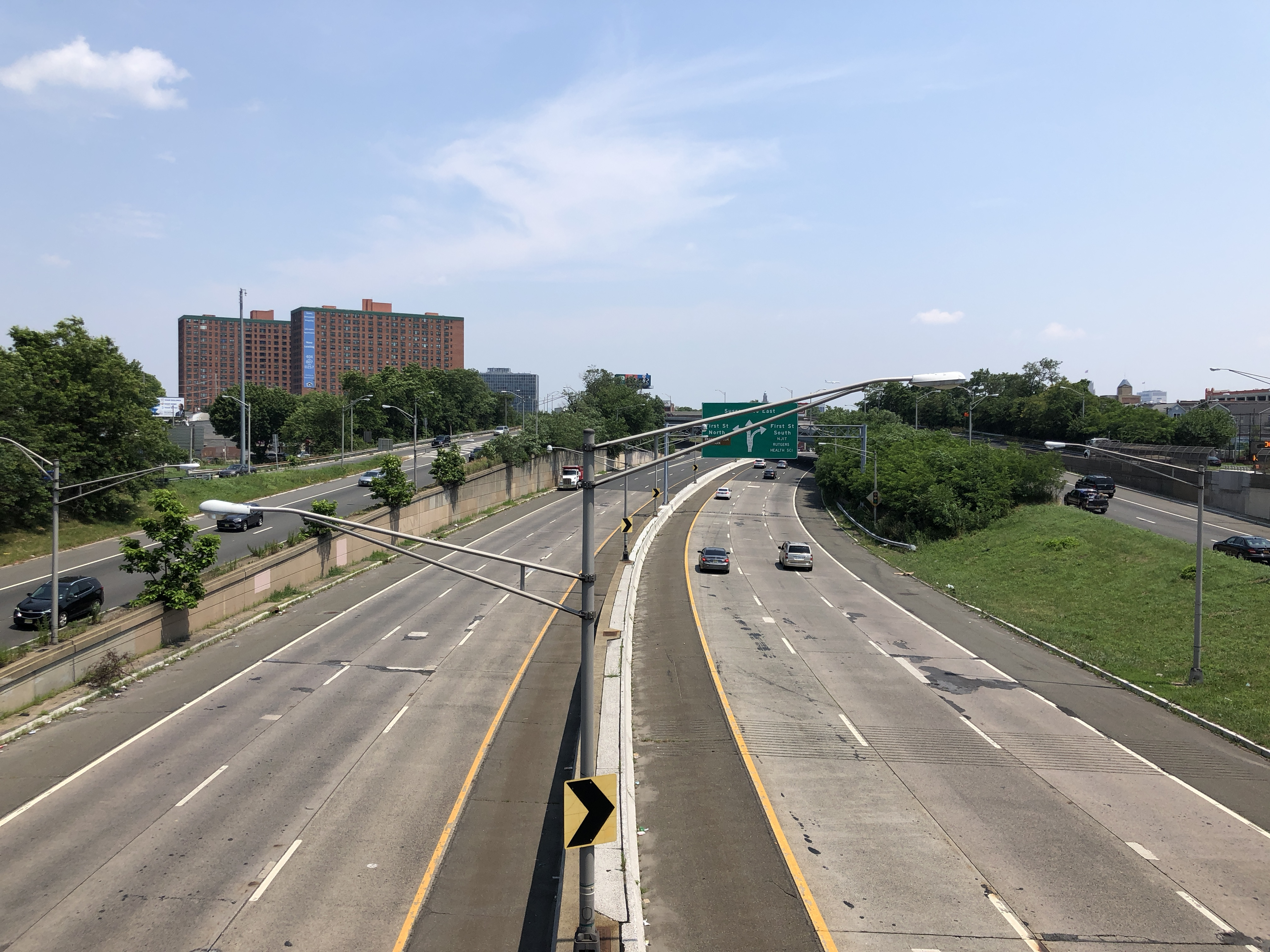
The Exit 13 ramps diverging from the median of I-280 were intended to link with Route 75

In 1961, the New Jersey State Highway Department announced plans to lower the existing traffic congestion through Newark with a new freeway through the center of the city. A study was almost immediately funded, named the "Newark Transportation Study", which suggested the construction of a new north–south arterial through midtown Newark. This new freeway was to connect U.S. Route 1, U.S. Route 9, Interstate 280 (co-signed New Jersey Route 58), Interstate 78 and Newark Liberty International Airport for Newark through traffic. The nearby New Jersey Route 21 (McCarter Highway) arterial was designated to handle local traffic in this situation. The new freeway was designed to handle 45,000 people in annual daily traffic by 1975. The new freeway, designated as Route 75, was to begin at an interchange with U.S. Routes 1 and 9 in the southern end of Newark (near the Airport) and continue through Midtown Newark to an interchange with Route 21 south of current-day Exit 4 (Chester Avenue), where the right-of-ways would merge in.

In 1962, the State Highway Department brought up the theory of expanding the Route 75 Freeway into a larger, 60 miles (97 km) Interstate 95 alignment extension of the Somerset Freeway. The route was to serve as the local area with an express-local format. Under this, the express lanes would serve Interstate 95, while the local lanes would serve Route 75. However, the plan did not gain traction and the Federal Bureau of Public Roads denied Interstate 95's alignment north of Interstate 287 in Middlesex County. (The Somerset Freeway portion Interstate 95 was canceled in 1982.) To add insult to injury, the State Highway Department had to scale back plans for the Route 75 Freeway in 1967. They recommended constructing the portion between Interstate 78 and Interstate 280 first, later to become a vital artery for Essex and Passaic Counties. Soil borings were taken in the mid-1960s along this shortened alignment. In 1967, the scaled back freeway, two miles (3.2 km) in length, had an estimated cost $69.7 million (1967 USD), and just two years later, this had ballooned to $115 million. Of this $115 million, a significant portion would go to condemning buildings and acquiring right-of-way. As a result, the Tri-State Transportation Commission suggested to construct only the Interstate 78-280 portion and not the extensions to Interstate 80 and the Goethals Bridge.

The proposal was met with fierce opposition by residents of the Central Ward, 20,000 of whom would have been displaced. After high costs began to inhibit further progress, the Department of Transportation suspended construction of the Route 75 Freeway in 1969. Although construction was stopped, the state forwarded the proposal of getting Route 75 to become an Interstate in 1970. The expressway remained on maps through the early 1970s until the state and federal government both shelved the freeway. In 1997, the New Jersey State Legislature repealed Route 75 from state law. Beginning in 2005, the state started construction on the University Heights Connector along the Route 75 right-of-way. As a result, the new connector used the old ramps built for Route 75 into Irvine Turner Boulevard in Newark. The project completed in 2008.

== Exit list ==
The following list shows the interchanges that were to be built on Route 75 prior to the scaling back of the project. The entire route would have been in Newark, Essex County.

mi	km	Destinations	Notes
0.00	0.00	US 1-9	Proposed southern terminus
		Route 27 (Frelinghusyen Avenue)	Southbound exit only
		US 22	Southbound exit only
		I-78	
		Route 27 (Frelinghusyen Avenue)	Southbound exit only
		Runyon Street	Southbound exit only
		Alpine Street	Northbound exit only
		Avon Avenue	Southbound exit only
		Waverly Avenue	Northbound exit only
		Kinney Street	Southbound exit only
		Court Street	Northbound exit only
		Market Street	Southbound exit only
		CR 508 (Central Avenue)	Northbound exit only
		I-280	Revised proposed northern terminus
		Park Avenue	Northbound exit only
		Route 21	Original proposed northern terminus
1.000 mi = 1.609 km; 1.000 km = 0.621 mi
