= List of county routes in Hunterdon County, New Jersey =

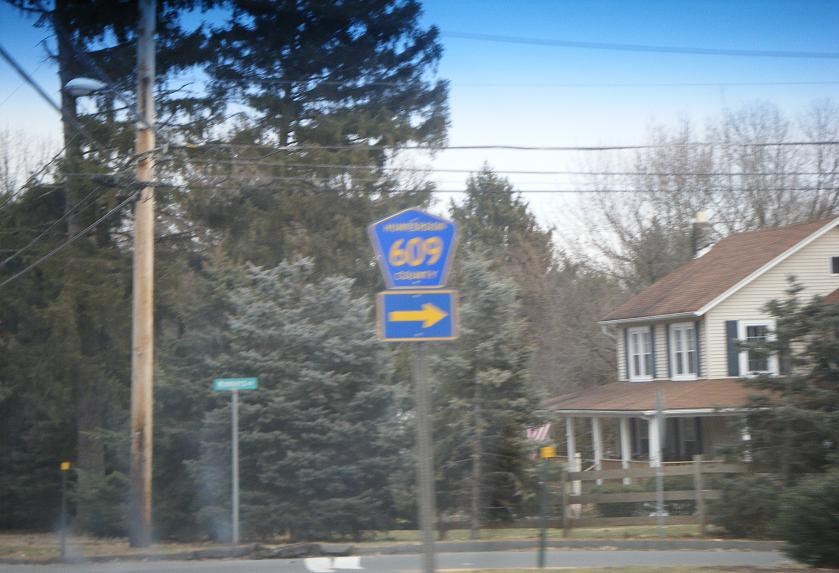
Shield for CR 609 along CR 514

The following is a list of county routes in Hunterdon County in the U.S. state of New Jersey. For more information on the county route system in New Jersey as a whole, including its history, see County routes in New Jersey.

== 500-series county routes ==
In addition to those listed below, the following 500-series county routes serve Hunterdon County:

- CR 512, CR 513, CR 514, CR 517, CR 518, CR 519, CR 523, and CR 579

== Other county routes ==
Route	Length (mi)	Length (km)	From	Via	To	Notes
CR 600	0.57	0.92	Route 31 in Raritan Township	Wescott Drive	Sand Hill Road (CR 612) in Raritan Township	
CR 601	3.65	5.87	Brunswick Pike CR 518) and Lambertville–Hopewell Road (CR 518) in West Amwell Township	Mount Airy–Harbourton Road, Mount Airy Village Road	Route 179 in West Amwell Township	Partially on the Mercer/Hunterdon county line
CR 602	6.31	10.15	Old York Road (Route 179/CR 579) in East Amwell Township	Wertsville Road	Wertsville Road at the Somerset County line in East Amwell Township	
CR 603	0.54	0.87	Route 179 in West Amwell Township	Mount Airy Village Road	Mount Airy Village Road (CR 601) and Mount Airy–Harbourton Road (CR 601) in West Amwell Township	Maintained by West Amwell Township since 1981
CR 603	1.26	2.03	Shurts Road at the Warren County line in Bethlehem Township	Valley Road	Main Street (CR 645) in Hampton	Decommissioned in 1981
CR 604	7.27	11.70	Kingwood–Stockton Road (CR 519) in Delaware Township	Rosemont–Ringoes Road	John Ringo Road (CR 579) on the East Amwell/Raritan township line	
CR 605	3.60	5.79	Route 179 in West Amwell Township	Queen Road, Sand Ridge–Mount Airy Road, Cemetery Road	Stockton–Flemington Road (CR 523) in Delaware Township	
CR 606	0.4	0.6	Old Croton Road (CR 608) in Raritan Township	Capner Street Extension	Capner Street on the Raritan Township/Flemington border	Decommissioned in 1981
CR 607	2.08	3.35	Hopewell–Wertsvlle Road at the Mercer County line in East Amwell Township	Rileyville Road	Wertsville Road (CR 602) in East Amwell Township	
CR 608	3.95	6.36	Route 12 in Delaware Township	Old Croton Road	Capner Street Extension (CR 606) and Dayton Road in Raritan Township	Decommissioned in 1981
CR 609	2.31	3.72	Wertsville Road (CR 602) in East Amwell Township	Manners Road	Amwell Road (CR 514) in East Amwell Township	
CR 610	0.82	1.32	Uhlerstown–Frenchtown Bridge and Front Street in Frenchtown	Bridge Street, Race Street, Kingwood Avenue	Route 12 and Horseshoe Bend Road in Frenchtown	County-maintained portion of Route 12
CR 611	0.80	1.29	US 202/Route 31 in Raritan Township	South Main Street	Parker Avenue (Route 12) in Flemington	
CR 612	1.93	3.11	Thachers Hill Road (CR 617) and Klinesville Road (CR 617) in Raritan Township	Sand Hill Road, Bartles Corner Road	Flemington–Whitehouse Road (CR 523) and River Road (CR 523) in Raritan Township	
CR 613	3.68	5.92	Old York Road (CR 514) and Amwell Road (CR 514) on the East Amwell/Raritan township line	Old York Road, Main Street	US 202 in Readington Township	Partially former CR 514 Spur
CR 614	7.70	12.39	Milford–Warren Glen Road (CR 519) in Holland Township	Spring Mills Road, Little York–Mount Pleasant Road, Little York–Pattenburg Road, Pattenburg Road	Route 173 in Union Township	
CR 615	5.24	8.43	Route 12 in Kingwood Township	Pittstown Road	Pittstown Road (CR 579) and Quakertown Road (CR 579) in Franklin Township	
CR 616	2.08	3.35	Quakertown Road (CR 579) and Croton Road (CR 579) in Franklin Township	Quakertown Road	Cherryville Road (CR 617) in Franklin Township	
CR 617	8.72	14.03	Flemington border in Raritan Township	Thatcher Hill Road, Klinesville Road, Cherryville Road, Sidney Road	Pittstown Road (CR 513) on the Franklin/Union township line	
CR 618	0.50	0.80	Route 31 in Clinton Township	Stanton Grange Road, Grange Road	Stanton–Lebanon Road (CR 629) in Clinton Township	
CR 619	3.05	4.91	7th Street in Frenchtown	Milford–Frenchtown Road	Frenchtown Road (CR 519) and Milford–Mount Pleasant Road (CR 519) in Milford	
CR 620	4.22	6.79	CR 523 in Readington Township	East Dreahook Road, Readington Road	Dreahook Road (CR 637) and Readington Road (CR 637) at the Somerset County line in Readington Township	
CR 621	0.74	1.19	Stanton–Lebanon Road (CR 629) in Clinton Township	Round Valley Road	US 22 in Clinton Township	Designated by the New Jersey Department of Transportation as CR 751
CR 621	1.62	2.61	Quakertown Road (CR 616) in Franklin Township	Sidney Road	Cherryville Road (CR 617) and Sidney Road (CR 617) in Franklin Township	Decommissioned in 1981
CR 623	2.50	4.02	Country Club Drive and Mitchell Lane on the Clinton/Clinton Township border	Hamden Road, Wellington Drive, Allerton Road	Route 31 in Clinton Township	
CR 624	1.28	2.06	US 22 and Main Street (CR 523) in Readington	Old Highway 28	US 22 in Readington Township	Decommissioned in 1981
CR 625	5.04	8.11	Everittstown Road (CR 513) in Alexandria Township	Mechlin Corner Road	Route 173 in Union Township	
CR 626	1.21	1.95	Grayrock Road in Clinton Township	Beaver Avenue	Ramp from US 22 westbound in Clinton Township	
CR 627	6.05	9.74	Milford border in Holland Township	Riegelsville–Milford Road	Rieglesville–Warren Glen Road (CR 627) at the Warren County line in Holland Township	
CR 628	5.25	8.45	Route 31 in Glen Gardner	Main Street, West Hill Road, Bunnvale Road	High Bridge–Califon Road (CR 513) in Lebanon Township	
CR 629	12.71	20.45	Pleasant Run Road (CR 629) at the Somerset County line in Readington	Pleasant Run Road, Stanton Road, Stanton–Lebanon Road, Cherry Street	Main Street in Lebanon	Maintained by Lebanon inside borough limits
CR 631	1.73	2.78	Little York–Mount Pleasant Road (CR 519) and Milford–Mount Pleasant Road (CR 519) on the Alexandria/Holland township line	Little York–Mount Pleasant Road	Spring Mills Road (CR 614) on the Alexandria/Holland township line	
CR 633	0.69	1.11	Route 31 in Clinton Township	Old Allerton Road	Beaver Avenue (CR 626) in Clinton Township	
CR 635	6.31	10.15	Route 173 in Union Township	Charlestown Road, New Street, Main Street	Route 31 in Glen Gardner	
CR 637	0.48	0.77	Readington Road (CR 620) and Dreahook Road (CR 637) in Readington	Readington Road	Readington Road (CR 637) and Baird Road in Readington	Travels along the Somerset/Hunterdon county line
CR 639	5.73	9.22	US 22 in Lebanon	Cokesbury Road, River Road	High Bridge border in Clinton Township	
CR 641	1.32	2.12	Beaver Avenue (CR 626) in Clinton Township	West Street, Dewey Avenue	Michael Lane near the High Bridge border in Clinton Township	
CR 643	2.81	4.52	Route 173 in Bethlehem Township	Asbury–West Portal Road, Asbury Road	Old Main Street (CR 643) at the Warren County line Bethlehem Township	
CR 645	3.45	5.55	Route 31 in Hampton	Musconetcong River Road	Butler South Park Road in Lebanon Township	Formerly extended along Main Street in Hampton and Glen Gardner until 1981
CR 647	0.61	1.0	Route 31 in Raritan Township	Flemington Junction Road, Junction Road	Water E. Foran Boulevard (CR 523) in Raritan Township	
CR 649	0.25	0.40	Old York Road on the Lambertville/West Amwell border	Old York Road	Route 179 in West Amwell Township	Decommissioned in 1981
CR 650	2.44	3.93	Route 31 in Flemington	Vorhees Corner Road	Old York Road (CR 613) in Raritan Township	Formerly CR 514 Spur
CR 651	4.53	7.29	Route 29 in Kingwood Township	Byram–Kingwood Road	Kingwood–Stockton Road (CR 519) in Kingwood Township	Formerly CR 519 Spur
CR 652	0.17	0.27	Wescott Drive (CR 600) in Raritan Township	Gauntt Place	Route 31 in Raritan Township	
