= Bloomsbury, New Jersey =

Borough in Hunterdon County, New Jersey, US

- Borough
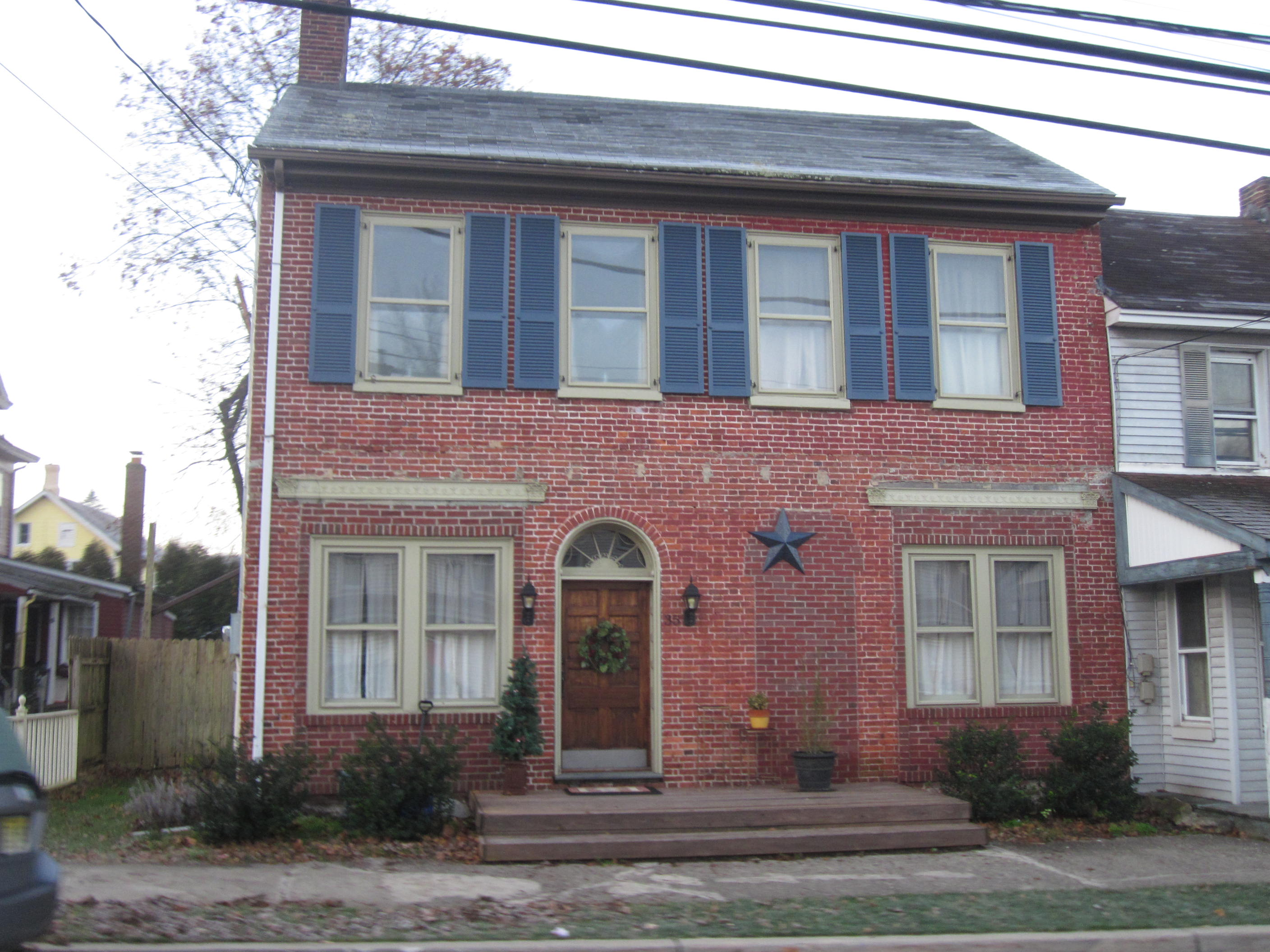
- House in Bloomsbury

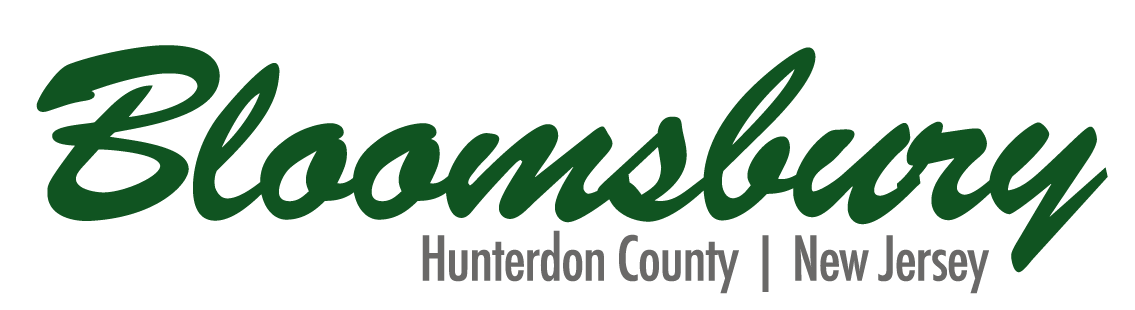
- wordmark

- Location of Bloomsbury in Hunterdon County highlighted in red (left). Inset map: Location of Hunterdon County in New Jersey highlighted in orange (right).

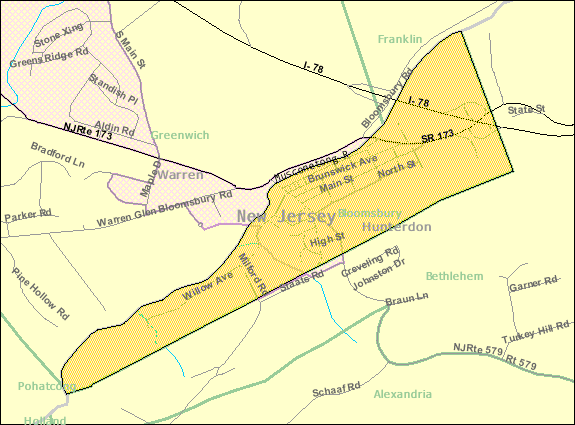
- Census Bureau map of Bloomsbury, New Jersey

- Location in Hunterdon County Location in New Jersey Location in the United States
- Coordinates: 40.656886°N 75.076225°W
- Country: United States
- State: New Jersey
- County: Hunterdon
- Incorporated: March 30, 1905

Government
  - Type: Borough
  - Body: Borough Council
  - Mayor: Vicky Papics (R, term ends December 31, 2027)
  - Administrator / Municipal clerk: Lisa A. Burd (as a shared service with Greenwich Township)

Area
  - Total: 0.96 sq mi (2.49 km^{2})
  - Land: 0.93 sq mi (2.42 km^{2})
  - Water: 0.031 sq mi (0.08 km^{2}) 3.23%
  - Rank: 509th of 565 in state 24th of 26 in county
- Elevation: 335 ft (102 m)

Population (2020)
  - Total: 792
  - Estimate (2023): 796
  - Rank: 542nd of 565 in state 25th of 26 in county
  - Density: 849.4/sq mi (328.0/km^{2})
  - Rank: 402nd of 565 in state 12th of 26 in county
- Time zone: UTC−05:00 (Eastern (EST))
  - Summer (DST): UTC−04:00 (Eastern (EDT))
- ZIP Code: 08804
- Area code: 908 exchange: 479
- FIPS code: 3401906370
- GNIS feature ID: 0885162
- School district: Phillipsburg School District
- Website: www.bloomsburyborough.com

Bloomsbury is a borough in Hunterdon County, in the U.S. state of New Jersey. As of the 2020 United States census, the borough's population was 792, a decrease of 78 (−9.0%) from the 2010 census count of 870, which in turn reflected a decline of 16 (−1.8%) from the 886 counted in the 2000 census.

Bloomsbury was incorporated as a borough by an act of the New Jersey Legislature on March 30, 1905, from portions of Bethlehem Township.

Bloomsbury was once known as "Johnson's Iron Works", owned by Robert Johnson, on the north bank of the river. The current name is derived either from the Bloom family, influential in the early history of the town, or from the iron ore processed into masses of wrought iron that are known as "blooms".

== Geography ==
According to the U.S. Census Bureau, the borough had a total area of 0.96 square miles (2.49 km^{2}), including 0.93 square miles (2.41 km^{2}) of land and 0.03 square miles (0.08 km^{2}) of water (3.23%). The borough borders the municipalities of Bethlehem Township in Hunterdon County; and Franklin Township, Greenwich Township and Pohatcong Township in Warren County. Bloomsbury is located on the south side of the Musconetcong River in the northwest corner of Hunterdon County and is the third-smallest municipality in Hunterdon County.

== Demographics ==
Historical population
Census	Pop.	Note	%±
1880	585		—
1910	600		—
1920	650		8.3%
1930	639		−1.7%
1940	704		10.2%
1950	722		2.6%
1960	838		16.1%
1970	879		4.9%
1980	864		−1.7%
1990	890		3.0%
2000	886		−0.4%
2010	870		−1.8%
2020	792		−9.0%
2023 (est.)	796	▲	0.5%
Population sources: 1910–1920; 1910 1910–1930 1940–2000; 2000 2010 2020

=== 2010 census ===
The 2010 United States census counted 870 people, 337 households, and 237 families in the borough. The population density was 991.9 per square mile (383.0/km^{2}). There were 358 housing units at an average density of 408.1 per square mile (157.6/km^{2}). The racial makeup was 95.40% (830) White, 1.03% (9) Black or African American, 0.00% (0) Native American, 1.84% (16) Asian, 0.00% (0) Pacific Islander, 0.34% (3) from other races, and 1.38% (12) from two or more races. Hispanic or Latino of any race were 4.02% (35) of the population.

Of the 337 households, 38.6% had children under the age of 18; 57.3% were married couples living together; 8.3% had a female householder with no husband present and 29.7% were non-families. Of all households, 24.0% were made up of individuals and 6.8% had someone living alone who was 65 years of age or older. The average household size was 2.58 and the average family size was 3.09.

27.0% of the population were under the age of 18, 5.3% from 18 to 24, 26.9% from 25 to 44, 31.6% from 45 to 64, and 9.2% who were 65 years of age or older. The median age was 40.1 years. For every 100 females, the population had 105.2 males. For every 100 females ages 18 and older there were 101.6 males.

The Census Bureau's 2006–2010 American Community Survey showed that (in 2010 inflation-adjusted dollars) median household income was $98,571 (with a margin of error of +/− $19,026) and the median family income was $106,324 (+/− $11,687). Males had a median income of $71,000 (+/− $9,149) versus $50,417 (+/− $7,595) for females. The per capita income for the borough was $42,141 (+/− $6,038). About 2.6% of families and 4.1% of the population were below the poverty line, including 6.3% of those under age 18 and 7.3% of those age 65 or over.

=== 2000 census ===
As of the 2000 United States census, there were 886 people, 322 households, and 252 families residing in the borough. The population density was 975.5 inhabitants per square mile (376.6/km^{2}). There were 342 housing units at an average density of 376.6 per square mile (145.4/km^{2}). The racial makeup of the borough was 98.19% White, 0.34% African American, 0.23% Native American, 0.34% Asian, 0.11% from other races, and 0.79% from two or more races. Hispanic or Latino of any race were 1.47% of the population.

There were 322 households, out of which 45.7% had children under the age of 18 living with them, 66.1% were married couples living together, 9.0% had a female householder with no husband present, and 21.7% were non-families. 15.8% of all households were made up of individuals, and 5.3% had someone living alone who was 65 years of age or older. The average household size was 2.74 and the average family size was 3.11.

In the borough, the population was spread out, with 29.8% under the age of 18, 3.8% from 18 to 24, 38.4% from 25 to 44, 17.9% from 45 to 64, and 10.0% who were 65 years of age or older. The median age was 36 years. For every 100 females, there were 93.0 males. For every 100 females age 18 and over, there were 93.8 males. The median income for a household in the borough was $64,375, and the median income for a family was $67,500. Males had a median income of $51,053 versus $33,750 for females. The per capita income for the borough was $26,392. About 4.8% of families and 3.8% of the population were below the poverty line, including 3.1% of those under age 18 and 8.9% of those age 65 or over.

== Government ==
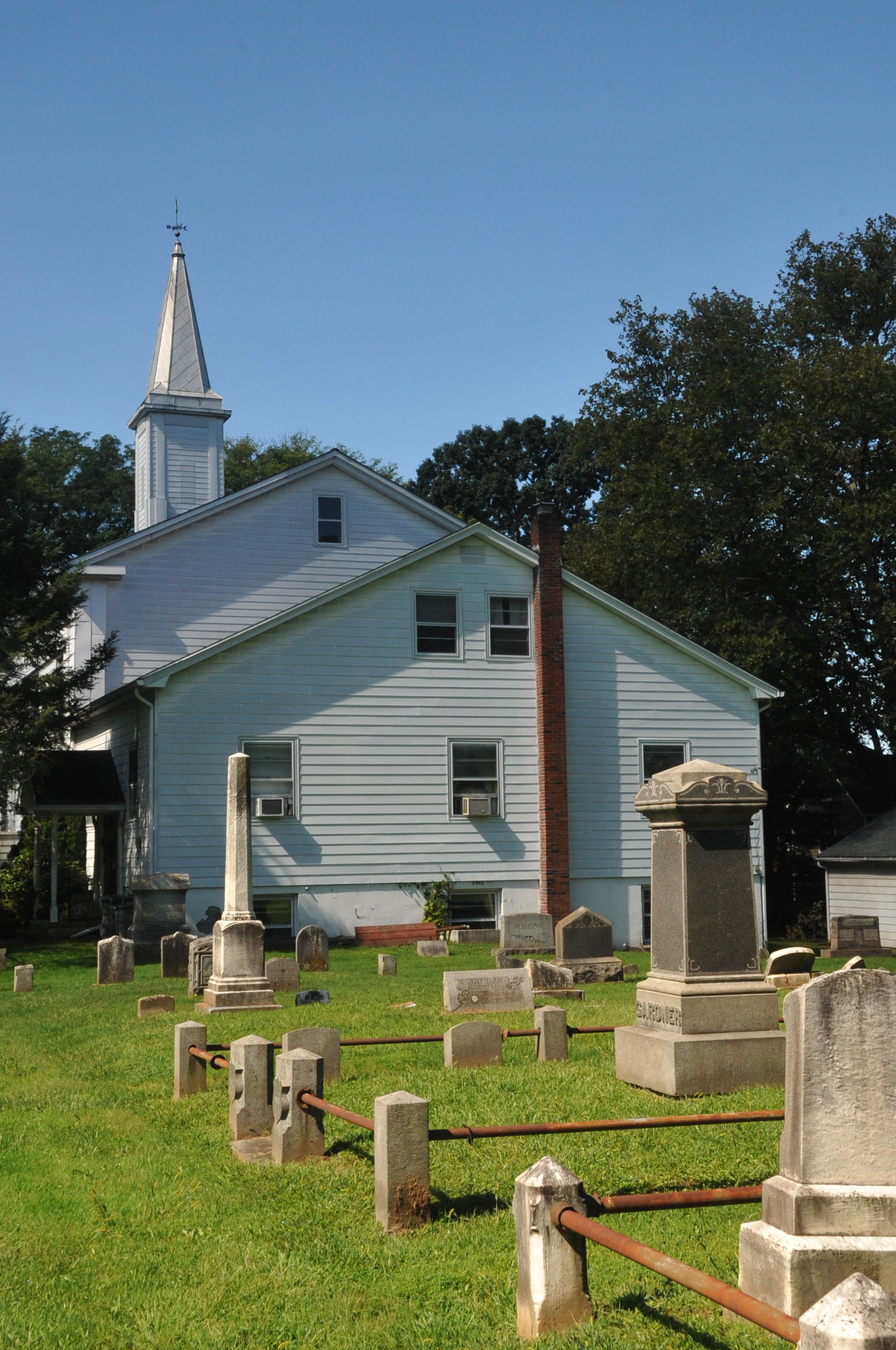
Bloomsbury Presbyterian Church

=== Local government ===
Bloomsbury is governed under the borough form of New Jersey municipal government, which is used in 218 municipalities (of the 564) statewide, making it the most common form of government in New Jersey. The governing body is comprised of a mayor and a borough council, with all positions elected at-large on a partisan basis as part of the November general election. A mayor is elected directly by the voters to a four-year term of office. The borough council includes six members elected to serve three-year terms on a staggered basis, with two seats coming up for election each year in a three-year cycle. The borough form of government used by Bloomsbury is a "weak mayor / strong council" government in which council members act as the legislative body with the mayor presiding at meetings and voting only in the event of a tie. The mayor can veto ordinances subject to an override by a two-thirds majority vote of the council. The mayor makes committee and liaison assignments for council members, and most appointments are made by the mayor with the advice and consent of the council.

As of 2024, the mayor of Bloomsbury is Republican Vicky Papics, whose term of office ends December 31, 2027. Members of the Borough Council are Todd Dangelo (R, 2025), Megan Henry (R, 2024), Scott McClaymont (R, 2025), Jaime Newman (R, 2026; appointed to serve an unfilled term of office), Chris Smith (R, 2024) and Daniel J. Smith (R, 2026).

=== Federal, state and county representation ===
Bloomsbury is located in the 7th Congressional District and is part of New Jersey's 23rd state legislative district.

For the 119th United States Congress, New Jersey's 7th congressional district is represented by Thomas Kean Jr. (R, Westfield). New Jersey is represented in the United States Senate by Democrats Cory Booker (Newark, term ends 2027) and Andy Kim (Moorestown, term ends 2031).

For the 2026–2027 session, the 23rd legislative district of the New Jersey Legislature is represented in the State Senate by Doug Steinhardt (R, Lopatcong Township) and in the General Assembly by John DiMaio (R, Hackettstown) and Erik Peterson (R, Franklin Township).

Hunterdon County is governed by a Board of County Commissioners comprised of five members who are elected at-large on a partisan basis to serve three-year terms of office on a staggered basis, with either one or two seats up for election each year as part of the November general election. At an annual reorganization meeting held each January, the commissioners select one member to serve as the board's Director and another to serve as Deputy Director, each for a one-year term. As of 2025, Hunterdon County's Commissioners are Director John E. Lanza (R; Raritan Township, 2025), Deputy Director Shaun C. Van Doren (R; Tewksbury Township, 2026), Jeff Kuhl (R; Raritan Township, 2027), Zachary T. Rich (R; West Amwell Township, 2025) and Susan Soloway (R; Franklin Township, 2027).

Constitutional officers elected on a countywide basis are Clerk Mary H. Melfi (R; Flemington, 2026), Sheriff Fredrick W. Brown (R; Alexandria Township, 2025) and Surrogate Heidi Rohrbach (R; Lebanon Township, 2028).

=== Politics ===
As of March 2011, there were a total of 546 registered voters in Bloomsbury, of which 120 (22.0%) were registered as Democrats, 227 (41.6%) were registered as Republicans and 199 (36.4%) were registered as Unaffiliated. There were no voters registered to other parties.

Gubernatorial election results for Bloomsbury
Year	Republican		Democratic		Third party(ies)	
Year	No.	%	No.	%	No.	%
2025	204	52.31%	182	46.67%	4	1.03%
2021	189	57.45%	132	40.12%	8	2.43%
2017	144	56.03%	107	41.63%	6	2.33%
2013	189	72.97%	65	25.10%	5	1.93%
2009	210	63.06%	75	22.52%	48	14.41%
2005	183	63.76%	83	28.92%	21	7.32%

In the 2012 presidential election, Republican Mitt Romney received 55.3% of the vote (223 cast), ahead of Democrat Barack Obama with 42.7% (172 votes), and other candidates with 2.0% (8 votes), among the 404 ballots cast by the borough's 561 registered voters (1 ballot was spoiled), for a turnout of 72.0%. In the 2008 presidential election, Republican John McCain received 55.0% of the vote (254 cast), ahead of Democrat Barack Obama with 42.6% (197 votes) and other candidates with 1.7% (8 votes), among the 462 ballots cast by the borough's 551 registered voters, for a turnout of 83.8%. In the 2004 presidential election, Republican George W. Bush received 64.1% of the vote (302 ballots cast), outpolling Democrat John Kerry with 33.5% (158 votes) and other candidates with 1.6% (9 votes), among the 471 ballots cast by the borough's 563 registered voters, for a turnout percentage of 83.7.

United States presidential election results for Bloomsbury
Year	Republican		Democratic		Third party(ies)	
Year	No.	%	No.	%	No.	%
2024	284	54.93%	225	43.52%	8	1.55%
2020	256	50.49%	238	46.94%	13	2.56%
2016	253	58.70%	165	38.28%	13	3.02%
2012	223	55.33%	172	42.68%	8	1.99%
2008	254	60.62%	157	37.47%	8	1.91%
2004	302	64.39%	158	33.69%	9	1.92%

In the 2013 gubernatorial election, Republican Chris Christie received 73.0% of the vote (189 cast), ahead of Democrat Barbara Buono with 25.1% (65 votes), and other candidates with 1.9% (5 votes), among the 260 ballots cast by the borough's 551 registered voters (1 ballot was spoiled), for a turnout of 47.2%. In the 2009 gubernatorial election, Republican Chris Christie received 62.1% of the vote (210 ballots cast), ahead of Democrat Jon Corzine with 22.2% (75 votes), Independent Chris Daggett with 12.4% (42 votes) and other candidates with 1.8% (6 votes), among the 338 ballots cast by the borough's 549 registered voters, yielding a 61.6% turnout.

United States Senate election results for Bloomsbury1
Year	Republican		Democratic		Third party(ies)	
Year	No.	%	No.	%	No.	%
2024	252	52.50%	217	45.21%	11	2.29%
2018	214	56.32%	148	38.95%	18	4.74%
2012	201	53.89%	153	41.02%	19	5.09%
2006	155	54.20%	111	38.81%	20	6.99%

United States Senate election results for Bloomsbury2
Year	Republican		Democratic		Third party(ies)	
Year	No.	%	No.	%	No.	%
2020	256	50.20%	243	47.65%	11	2.16%
2014	133	60.73%	83	37.90%	3	1.37%
2013	98	59.76%	62	37.80%	4	2.44%
2008	260	61.18%	143	33.65%	22	5.18%

== Education ==
The Bloomsbury School District serves students in pre-kindergarten through eighth grade at Bloomsbury Public School. As of the 2022–23 school year, the district, comprised of one school, had an enrollment of 96 students and 15.4 classroom teachers (on an FTE basis), for a student–teacher ratio of 6.2:1. In the 2016–17 school year, the district had the 11th-smallest enrollment of any school district in the state. The district participates in the Interdistrict Public School Choice Program, having been approved on November 2, 1999, as one of the first ten districts statewide to participate in the program. Seats in the program for non-resident students are specified by the district and are allocated by lottery, with tuition paid for participating students by the New Jersey Department of Education.

Public school students from Bloomsbury in ninth through twelfth grades attend Phillipsburg High School in Phillipsburg in Warren County, as part of a sending/receiving relationship with the Phillipsburg School District. The high school also serves students from four other sending communities: Alpha, Greenwich Township, Lopatcong Township and Pohatcong Township. As of the 2022–23 school year, the high school had an enrollment of 1,794 students and 136.5 classroom teachers (on an FTE basis), for a student–teacher ratio of 13.1:1. Eighth grade students from all of Hunterdon County are eligible to apply to attend the high school programs offered by the Hunterdon County Vocational School District, a county-wide vocational school district that offers career and technical education at its campuses in Raritan Township and at programs sited at local high schools, with no tuition charged to students for attendance.

== Transportation ==
=== Roads and highways ===
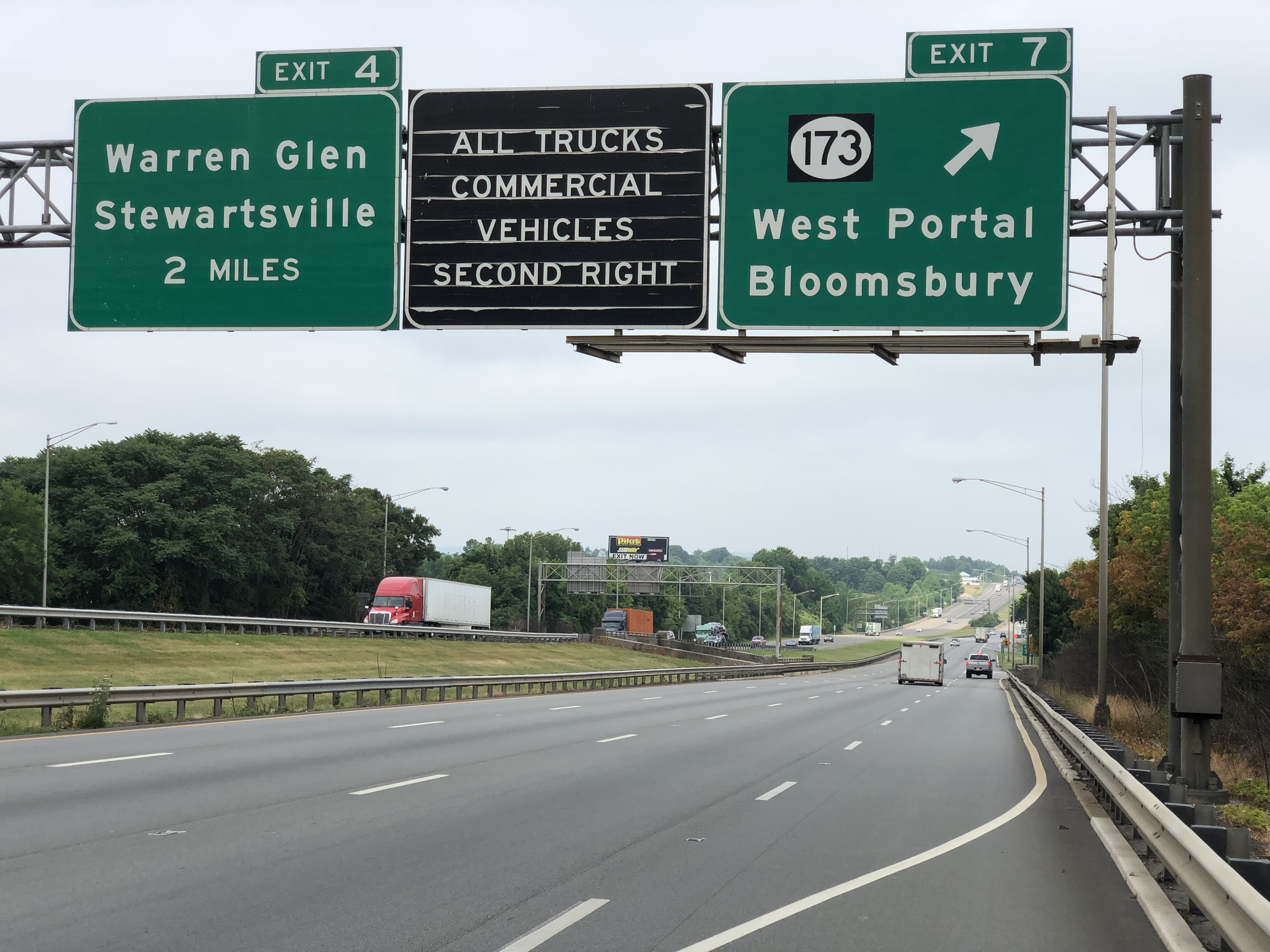
Interstate 78 / U.S. Route 22 in Bloomsbury

As of May 2010, the borough had a total of 6.77 miles (10.90 km) of roadways, of which 4.99 miles (8.03 km) were maintained by the municipality, 0.49 miles (0.79 km) by Hunterdon County and 1.29 miles (2.08 km) by the New Jersey Department of Transportation.

Several major roads run through the borough. Interstate 78 / U.S. Route 22 pass through the north and connects Bloomsbury at Exit 7 with Route 173.

The major county road that passes through is County Route 579.

=== Public transportation ===
Public transportation is limited to The LINK, a public bus service which serves Hunterdon County. Funding for operation of the Hunterdon County LINK System is provided by Hunterdon County, NJ Transit and the Federal Transit Administration.

=== Rail / Lehigh Line ===
Norfolk Southern Railway's Lehigh Line (formerly the mainline of the Lehigh Valley Railroad), runs through the southwest part of Bloomsbury along the border with Bethlehem Township on its way to Phillipsburg, New Jersey.

== Notable people ==
People who were born in, residents of, or otherwise closely associated with Bloomsbury include:

- Lucky 13 (ring name of Kevin J. Papics, born 1984), professional wrestler known for his time with Combat Zone Wrestling and Game Changer Wrestling
- John T. Bird (1829–1911), represented New Jersey's 3rd congressional district from 1869 to 1873
- Carla Katz (born 1959), attorney who served as president of Local 1034 of the Communications Workers of America from 1999 to 2008
- Jen Ponton (born 1984), actress, screenwriter and producer, best known for portraying Rubi in the AMC series Dietland
