= Norton, New Jersey =

Populated place in Hunterdon County, New Jersey, US

- Unincorporated community
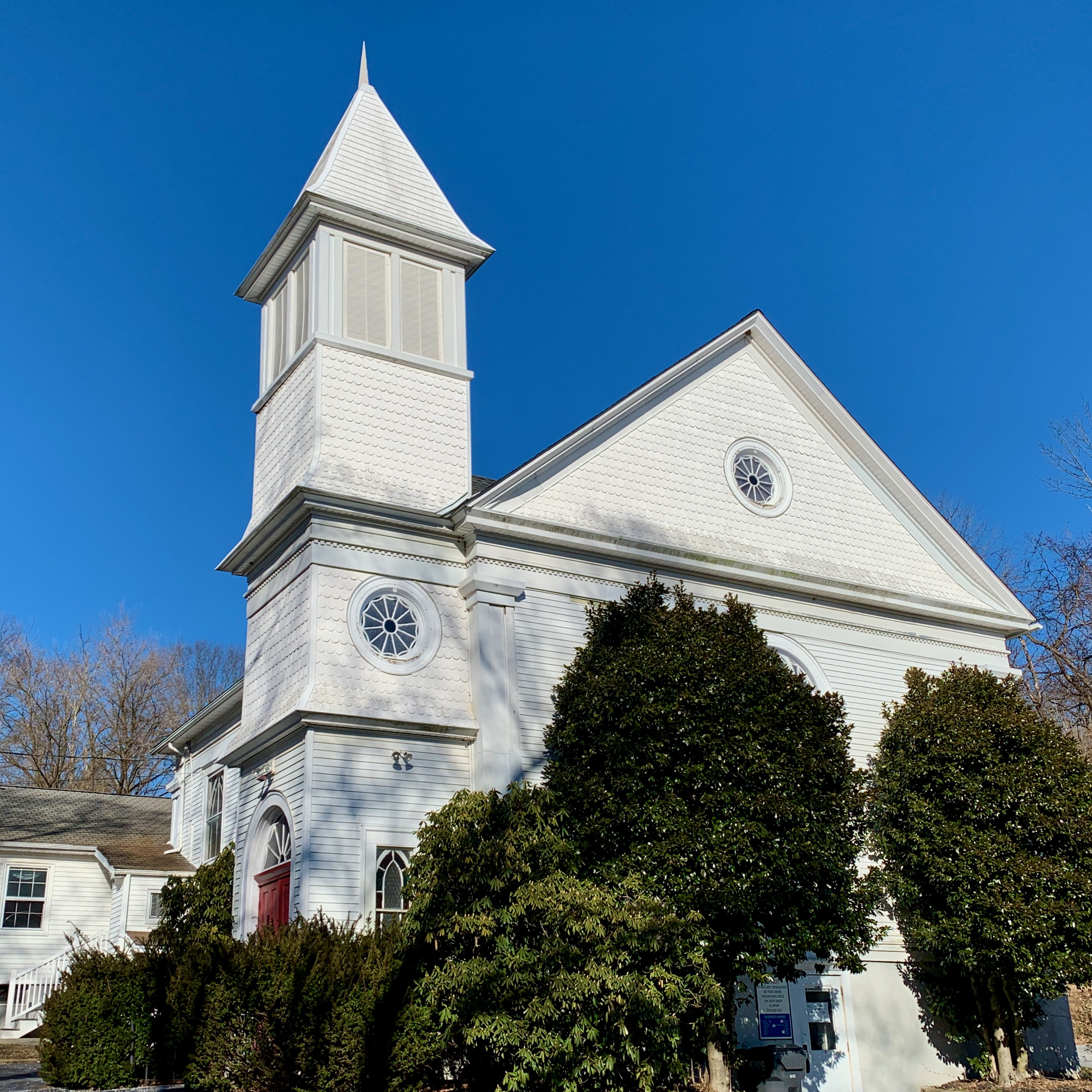
- Norton Methodist Episcopal Church

- Location within Hunterdon County, New Jersey Location within New Jersey Location within the United States
- Coordinates: 40°39′26″N 74°58′45″W
- Country: United States
- State: New Jersey
- County: Hunterdon
- Township: Union
- Elevation: 360 ft (110 m)
- GNIS feature ID: 878889

Norton is an unincorporated community located within Union Township in Hunterdon County, New Jersey. Norton is located on County Route 635, approximately 1.5 mi (2.4 km) northwest of Interstate 78. The village is included in the Van Syckel Corner District, which was added to the National Register of Historic Places in 1979.

== History ==
In 1846, Peter B. Scrope opened a store in his home in Norton.

An early log schoolhouse was built in Norton, but was abandoned. In 1872, the Norton School was built.

A post office was established in 1877, with mail delivery three times per week.

By 1882, Norton had a tannery, and a population of 203.

The North Hunterdon United Methodist Church, also known as the Norton Methodist Episcopal Church, was first built here in 1828, and the Norton Cemetery is located north of the settlement. The church was rebuilt in 1855, with renovations in 1881 and 1908. It is along the border of Union Township with Bethlehem Township.
