= Musconetcong Mountain =

Mountain ridge in New Jersey

Coordinates: 40.658113°N 75.009413°W

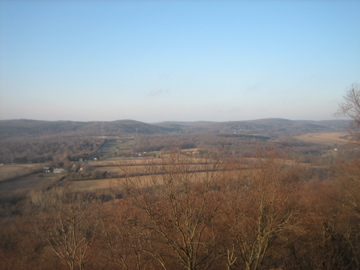
The view from Point Mountain of Anderson and the Musconetcong Valley

Musconetcong Mountain is a ridge in the Highlands region of New Jersey running south of and parallel to the Musconetcong River. The ridge travels through Alexandria, Holland, Bethlehem and Lebanon Township.

== Prominent features ==
- Point Mountain, 935 feet, in Lebanon Township

== Central Delaware Valley American Viticultural Area ==
The southern boundary of the Central Delaware Valley AVA, an American Viticultural Area, is near Titusville, New Jersey, and its northern border is near Musconetcong Mountain.
