= New Jersey Route 24 =

Highway in New Jersey

Route 24

Route information
- Maintained by NJDOT
- Length: 10.42 mi (16.77 km)
- Existed: 1927 (1976 on present alignment)–present

Major junctions
- West end: I-287 in Hanover
- Route 124 / CR 649 in Millburn
- East end: I-78 in Springfield

Location
- Country: United States
- State: New Jersey
- Counties: Morris, Essex, Union

Highway system
- New Jersey State Highway Routes; Interstate; US; State; Scenic Byways
← Route 23	→ Route 25

Route 24 is a 10.42-mile (16.77 km) freeway in New Jersey, United States, that begins at a junction with Interstate 287 (I-287) in Hanover in Morris County, passes southeast through Essex County, and ends at an interchange with I-78 in Springfield in Union County.

The route was created in 1927 to run from Phillipsburg to Newark, replacing pre-1927 Route 12 from Phillipsburg to Penwell and pre-1927 Route 5 from Morristown to Newark. The route was extended west to the new Easton–Phillipsburg Toll Bridge in 1938 but was cut back to U.S. Route 22 (US 22) in the eastern part of Phillipsburg in 1953. The western terminus was cut back further around 1970 to Hackettstown with the route west of there becoming part of Route 57. The freeway alignment of Route 24 between JFK Parkway and I-78 was completed in 1976.

With the completion of this freeway, Route 24 east of JFK Parkway became Route 124. The freeway was completed between the abandoned Triborough Road interchange and the JFK Parkway interchange in the 1970s but was not opened until 1992, when the rest of the freeway to I-287 was completed after years of legal, environmental and budgetary problems. At this time, the alignment of Route 24 between US 202 in Morristown and JFK Parkway became a western extension of Route 124 while the route was officially eliminated between Hackettstown and Morristown as it followed county-maintained routes. The former route between Hackettstown and Morristown is still referred to as Route 24 by many and is still signed as such due to local outcry.

== Route description ==
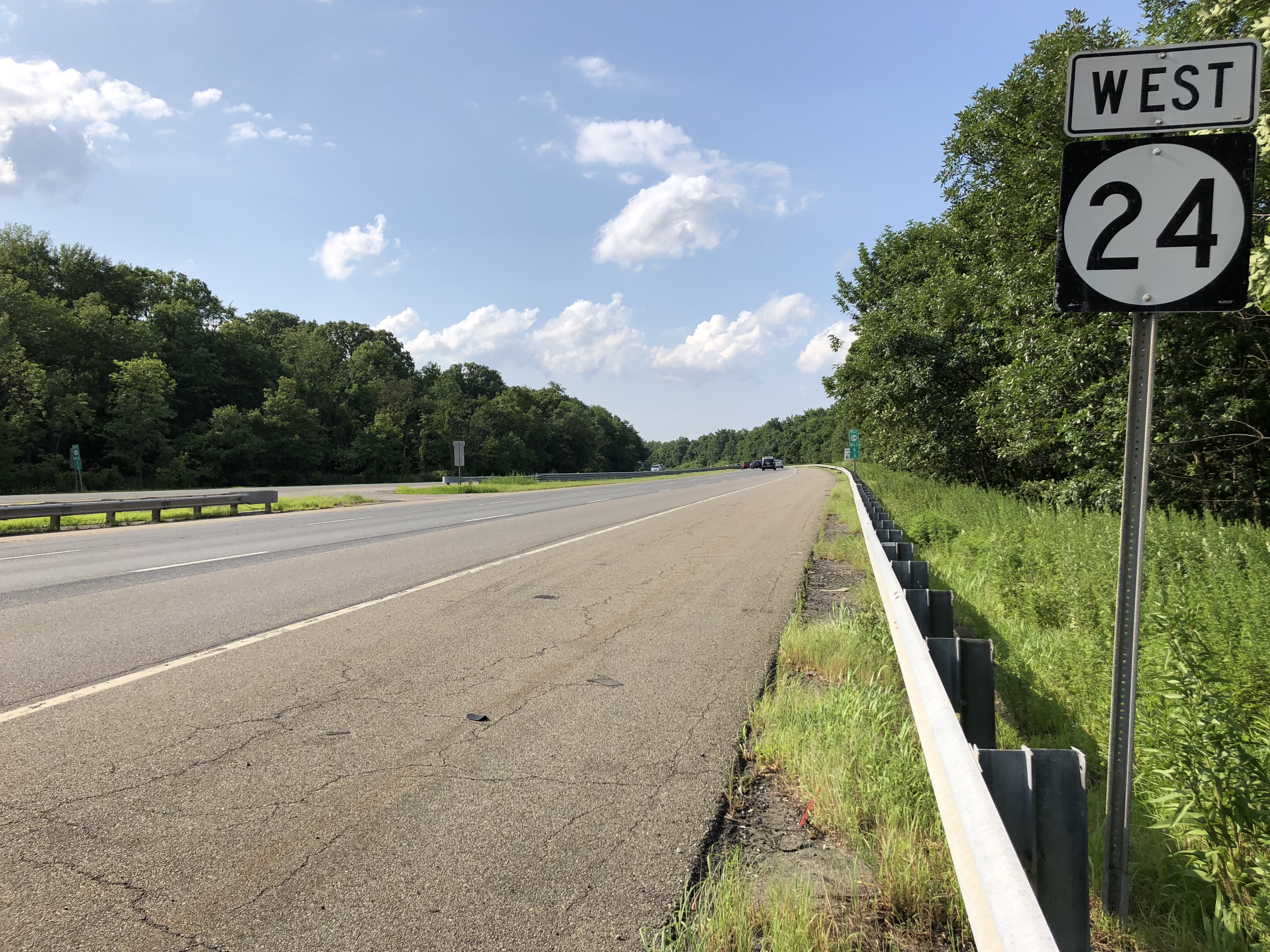
Route 24 westbound in Chatham

Route 24 begins at an interchange with I-287 in Hanover, Morris County, heading southeast on a six-lane freeway. The route intersects Whippany Road (County Route 511 [CR 511]) with a westbound exit and eastbound entrance and crosses into Morris Township. Route 24 crosses back into Hanover Township, where it passes over Park Avenue (CR 623) and narrows to four lanes, and intersects Columbia Turnpike (CR 510) at a cloverleaf interchange near the Morristown Municipal Airport. Just past this interchange, the freeway crosses into Florham Park, heading southeast and passing through Madison before crossing back into Florham Park. Route 24 passes under Triborough Road and enters Chatham. An abandoned cloverleaf interchange exists at this location, as Triborough Road was to be an extension of Eisenhower Parkway.

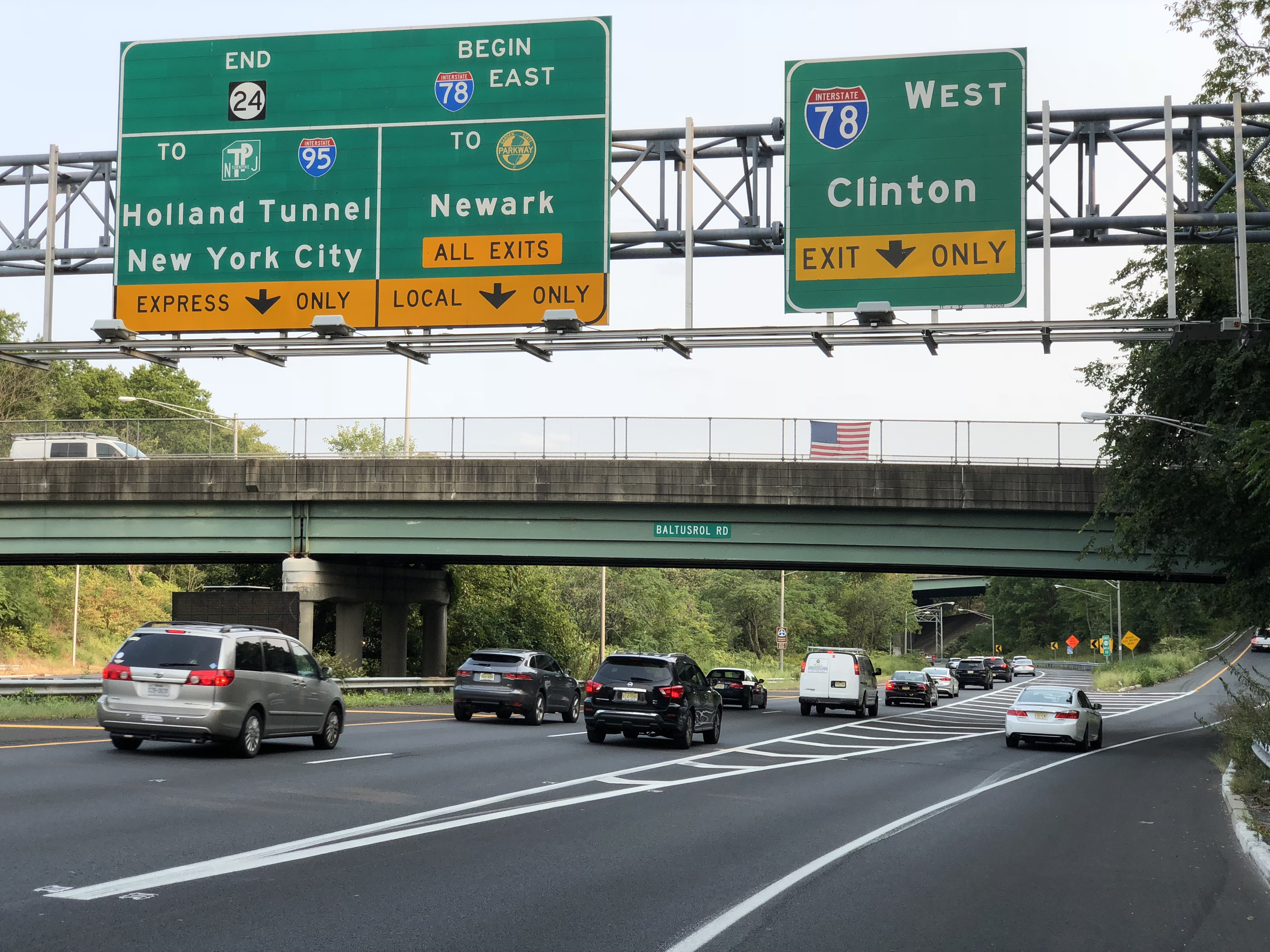
View east at the eastern end of Route 24 at I-78 in Springfield Township

Route 24 crosses into Millburn, Essex County, widens to six lanes, and passes over the Passaic River. In Millburn Township, the route intersects Route 124, JFK Parkway (CR 649), and River Road. This interchange provides access to The Mall at Short Hills. Past this interchange, Route 124 becomes a frontage road for Route 24, and the freeway forms the border between Summit in Union County and Millburn. After bisecting the Canoe Brook Country Club, the highway intersects Summit Avenue (CR 657). Route 24 continues along the Summit–Millburn border until it fully enters Millburn and intersects Hobart Avenue (CR 608) with a westbound exit and eastbound entrance. Past this interchange, the Route 124 frontage road ends; Route 124 follows the freeway closely to the north as a two-way road, and Route 24 crosses into Summit before passing under NJ Transit's Morris & Essex Lines. The freeway then intersects Broad Street (CR 512) with a westbound exit and entrance and eastbound exit and Morris Avenue (CR 527) with an eastbound exit and entrance, entering Springfield. Route 24 continues southeast toward its terminus at an interchange with I-78.

== History ==
Route S24
- Location: Penwell–Hackettstown; Springfield–Elizabeth
- Existed: 1927–1953

Route 24 follows the course of the Great Minisink Trail, and old Lenape trail running from Minisink Village in what is now Montague Township to Navesink. In 1801, the Morris Turnpike was legislated to run along this trail from Newton through Morristown to Elizabeth. In 1806, the Washington Turnpike was legislated to run from Morristown to Philipsburg. In 1916, both of these routes were incorporated into the William Penn Highway, which diverged from the Morris Turnpike at Springfield to service Newark by the old Springfield and Newark Turnpike, and diverged north to Hackettstown via Schooley's Mountain Road and modern-day Route 57. That same year, the state put a part of pre-1927 Route 12 (from Phillipsburg to Penwell) and part of pre-1927 Route 5 (from Morristown to Newark) on this route.

In the 1927 highway renumbering, Route 24 was created to run from Downtown Phillipsburg at the Northampton Street Bridge over the Delaware River east to Route 25 (now US 1/9) in Newark, almost completely superseding the William Penn Highway. The only diversion from that route was a proposed highway from Penwell to Long Valley, closely paralleling the Washington Turnpike. Two spurs of Route 24 numbered Route S24 were created in 1927, both of which were renumbered in the 1953 renumbering. The western Route S24 replaced the William Penn Highway and ran northeast from Penwell to Hackettstown, and is now mostly Route 57. The eastern Route S24 ran from Springfield to Elizabeth, and is now mostly Route 82. In addition, Route 24N was a planning number for the approach to the new Delaware River crossing (the Easton–Phillipsburg Toll Bridge) in Phillipsburg that opened in 1938. However, before the bridge opened, Route 24N was instead built simply as an extension of Route 24. Between 1938 and 1941, this segment was also designated as part of a rerouted US 22. In the 1953 renumbering, Route 24's western terminus was cut back to US 22 in eastern Phillipsburg (removing the concurrency in that town) and the incomplete section of Route 24 between Penwell and Long Valley was bridged by signing the route along the former Route S24 and CR 517. Around 1970, Route 24 west of Hackettstown became part of Route 57.

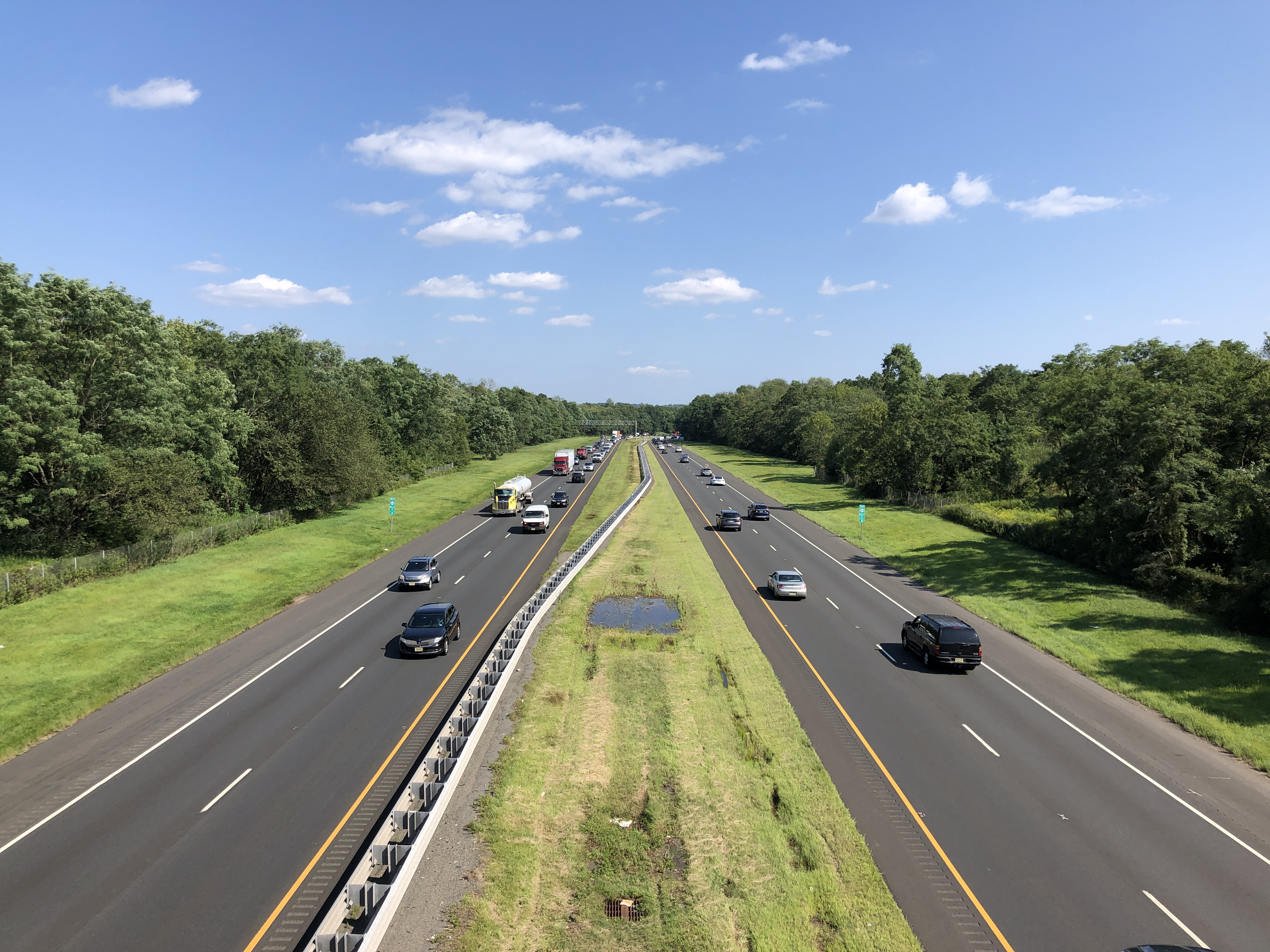
Route 24 eastbound in Chatham

Plans for the Route 24 freeway originate in 1950 when a bypass of the many congested towns along the route was planned; this bypass was designated as a freeway in 1952. In 1959, the freeway was planned on its current alignment, running from I-287 near Morristown to I-78 in Springfield, with approval in 1960. In 1962, plans were made to extend the Route 24 freeway west to US 22 in Phillipsburg. In the 1970s, this western extension was cut back to US 206 in Chester. It was put on hold in 1982, largely because its route was planned through protected wetlands and forests. In 1970, the Route 24 freeway was planned to become part of a western extension of I-278, which would have run northwest from its current terminus at US 1/9 in Linden to I-78, which it would have followed west for a mile to the Route 24 freeway. However, this proposal was rejected by the Federal Highway Administration.

Route 24N (planned in 1938)

Construction on the section of the Route 24 freeway between the John F. Kennedy Parkway on the Essex/Morris County border and I-78 began in 1967 and was finished in 1976. With the completion of this section, the former alignment of Route 24 between JFK Parkway and the boundary between Maplewood and Irvington, including frontage roads built alongside a portion of the freeway in the Short Hills area, was designated as Route 124. The section across Chatham Borough from JFK Parkway to shortly past the still-existing unused cloverleaf interchange at the Florham Park borough line, once signed as the Triborough Road, a never-built southern extension of the Eisenhower Parkway, was built in 1973-74 but not opened as it did not provide any connections to existing roads. Plans were made to finish the rest of the freeway to I-287; however construction was halted for many years due to legal, environmental and budgetary problems. Construction finally began on this portion of freeway in 1988. Route 24 was finally completed through to the interchange with I-287 in Hanover on November 17, 1992, and at that time the Route 24 designation was limited to strictly that freeway.

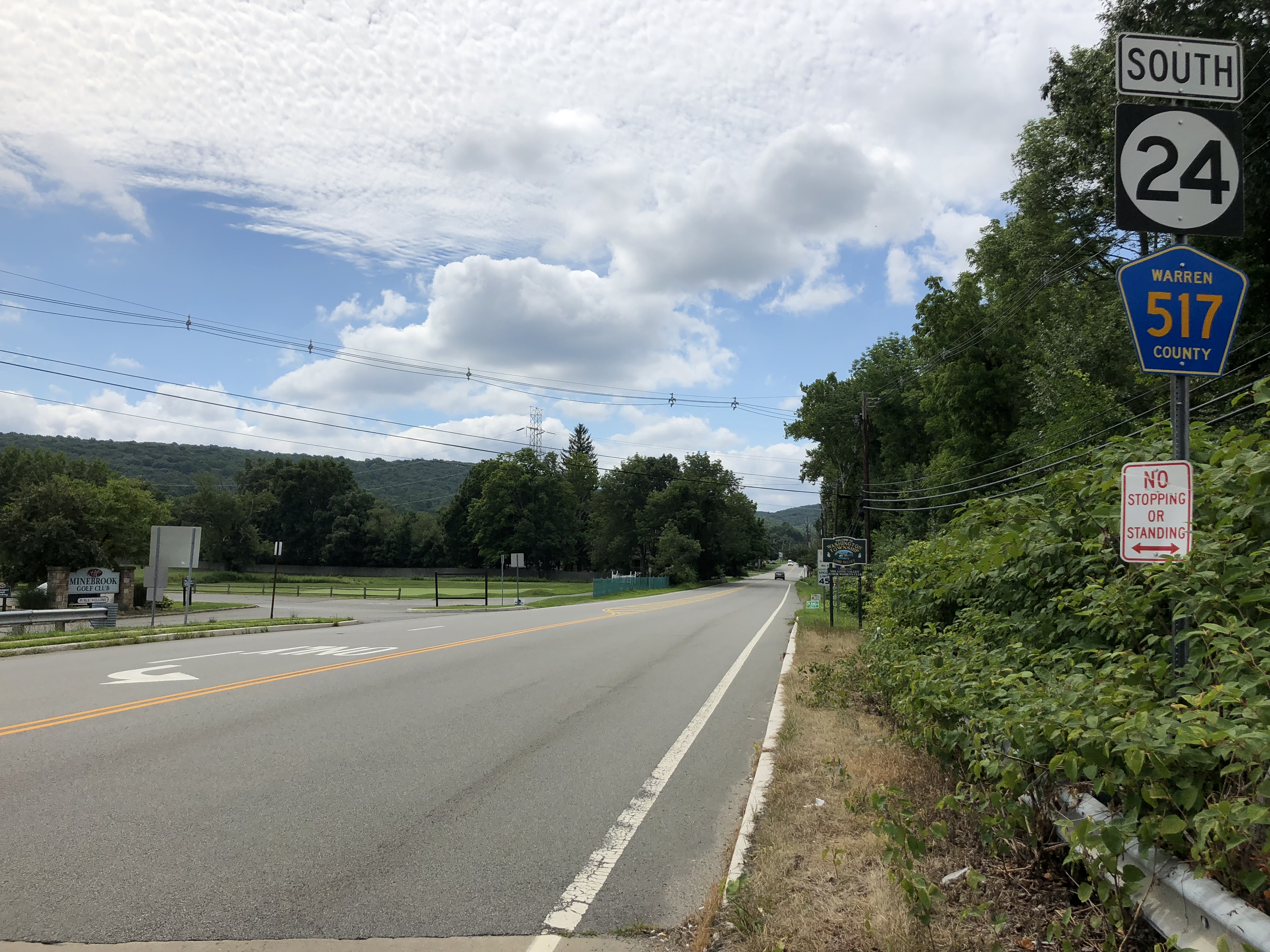
Route 24 signed along its former alignment along CR 517 south of Hackettstown

Following the completion of the freeway, the former signed route of Route 24 between the intersection with US 202 in Morristown and the JFK Parkway became a western extension of Route 124. The western portion between Route 57 and Route 182 in Hackettstown and US 202 officially had the Route 24 designation removed as the road has always been county-maintained rather than state-maintained. The New Jersey Department of Transportation (NJDOT) has tried to remove signs from this section, but locals protested because of their familiarity with the Route 24 designation. Along this route, the road is known as CR 517 from the Morris-Warren county line to the Long Valley section of Washington Township, CR 513 from Long Valley to Chester, and CR 510 from Chester to Morristown. This route is also known as Old Route 24 along with its names and county route numbers.

== Exit list ==
County	Location	mi	km	Exit	Destinations	Notes
Morris	Hanover Township	0.00	0.00	–	I-287 to I-80 – Somerville, Mahwah	Western terminus; exit 37 on I-287
Morris	Hanover Township	0.70	1.13	1	CR 511 – Morristown, Whippany	Westbound exit and eastbound entrance; signed as exits 1A (south) and 1B (north)
Morris	Hanover Township	2.09	3.36	2	CR 510 – Morristown, Florham Park	Signed as exits 2A (west) and 2B (east)
Morris	Chatham Borough	5.70	9.17	5	Triborough Road	Cloverleaf interchange built but never connected to a road and left abandoned
Essex	Millburn	6.99	11.25	7A	Route 124 west – Chatham	Westbound exit and eastbound entrance
Essex	Millburn	7.07	11.38	7	River Road / JFK Parkway (CR 649) – Summit, Livingston, Caldwell	Signed as exits 7B (Summit) and 7C (Livingston/Caldwell) westbound
Essex	Millburn	7.99	12.86	8	Summit Avenue (CR 657 south) – Summit, Chatham	
Essex	Millburn	8.60	13.84	9B	Hobart Gap Road / Hobart Avenue (CR 608)	Westbound exit and eastbound entrance
Union	Springfield Township	9.45	15.21	9A	Broad Street (CR 512 west) – Summit, Millburn, Springfield	Signed as exits 9A (Broad Street) and 9B (Summit/Millburn) eastbound; access to Summit/Millburn via CR 527
Union	Springfield Township	10.42	16.77	–	I-78 to I-95 Toll / N.J. Turnpike / G.S. Parkway – Newark, Holland Tunnel, New York City, Clinton	Eastern terminus; exit 48 on I-78
1.000 mi = 1.609 km; 1.000 km = 0.621 mi: Closed/former; Incomplete access
