= New Jersey Route 181 =

State highway in Jefferson, New Jersey, United States

Route 181

Route information
- Maintained by NJDOT
- Length: 7.47 mi (12.02 km)
- Existed: 1974–present

Major junctions
- South end: Route 15 in Jefferson Township
- North end: Route 15 in Sparta Township

Location
- Country: United States
- State: New Jersey
- Counties: Morris, Sussex

Highway system
- New Jersey State Highway Routes; Interstate; US; State; Scenic Byways
← Route 180	→ Route 182

Route 181 is a 7.47-mile (12.02 km) state highway in Jefferson Township and Sparta Township in New Jersey. The highway begins in Jefferson Township at a cloverleaf interchange with Route 15 and Espanong Road. Route 181 serves as the local route through Woodport, serving the eastern shores of Lake Hopatcong as well as the main road through the center of Sparta. The route terminates at a jughandle with Route 15 in Sparta.

Route 181 originated as an alignment of State Highway Route 6-A through Woodport and Sparta, which became Route 15 in the 1953 state highway renumbering. In 1974, Route 181 was designated as Route 15 was moved onto a freeway bypass of Sparta.

== Route description ==
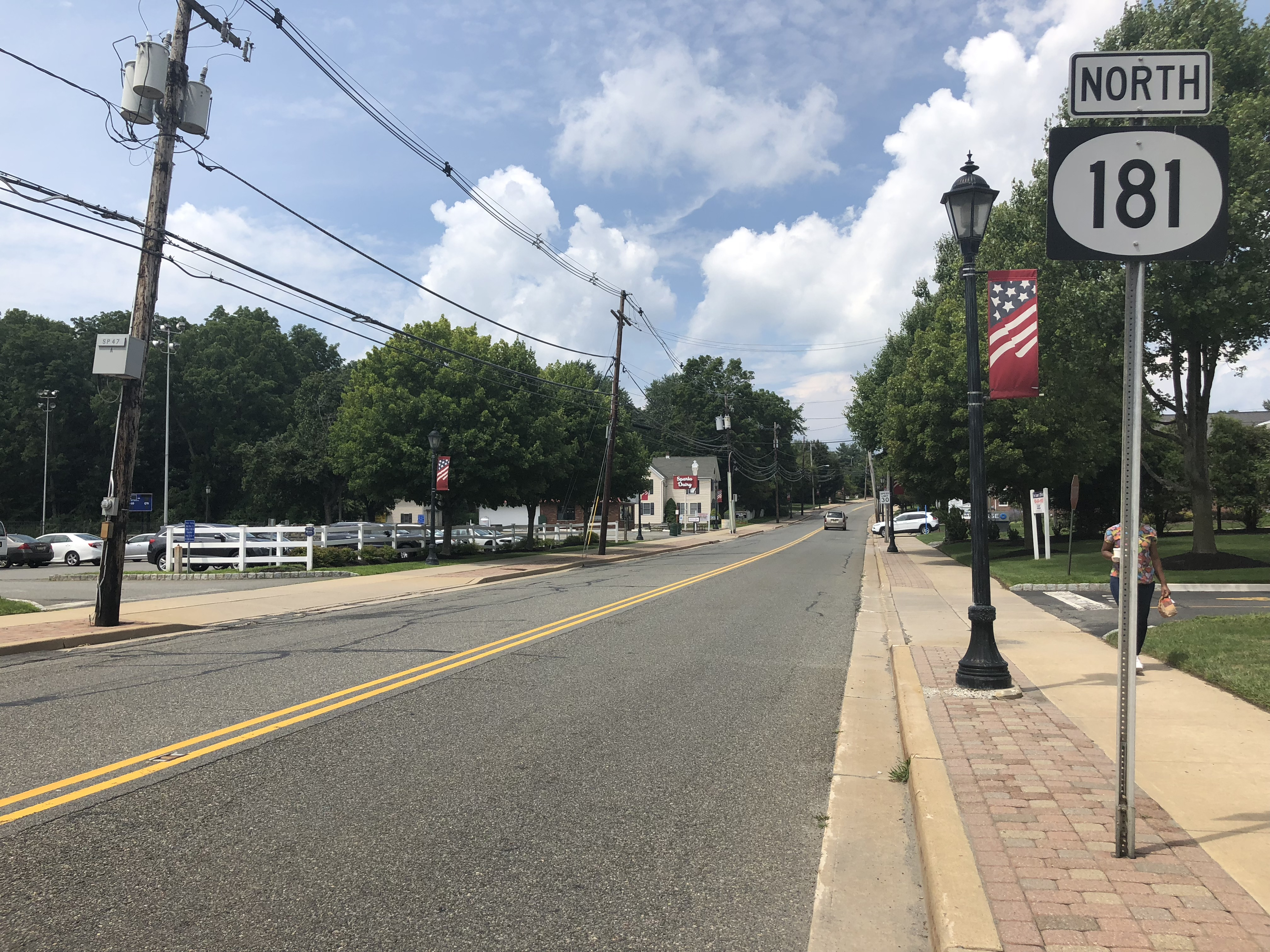
View north along Route 181 between Main Street and Lewis Lane in Sparta

Route 181 begins at Espanong Road within a cloverleaf interchange with Route 15 in Jefferson Township. Espanong Road, which heads westward towards Lake Hopatcong, provides some of the missing movements to Route 15 not directly accessible from Route 181. Route 181 runs north past several ramps of the interchange, paralleling Route 15 through Jefferson Township. The route winds northwest and reaches the eastern shores of Lake Hopatcong, where it reaches the community of Woodport.

At Woodport, Lake Hopatcong ends as Route 181 crosses the line from Morris County to Sussex County. Now in the town of Sparta, Route 181 becomes Woodport Road, winding northward back toward Route 15. The two routes parallel northwestward and intersect with Blue Heron Drive, which connects the two roads. Once again, Route 181 turns northwest and away from Route 15, reaching downtown Sparta. The two-lane road winds northwest through the center of Sparta, reaching a junction with County Route 517 (CR 517; Sparta Avenue), which connects to Route 15 once again.

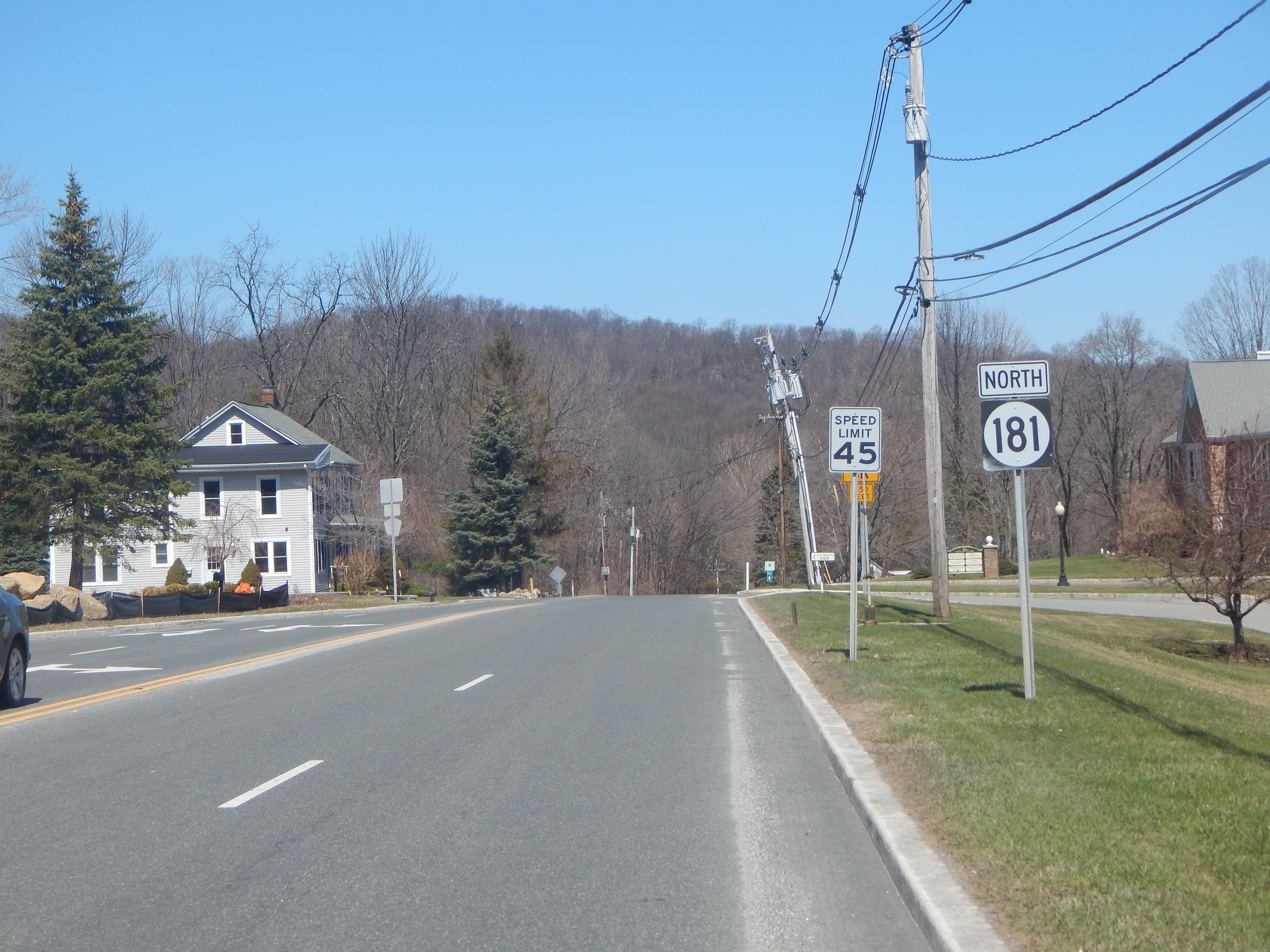
Route 181 northbound after CR 517 in Sparta

After CR 517, Route 181 runs northward out of downtown Sparta, passing the Skyview Golf Club as it approaches Route 15 once again. Becoming a two-lane residential road, the highway heads into an intersection with Route 15 with a jughandle, marking the northern terminus of Route 181.

== History ==
Route 181 originated as an alignment of State Highway Route 6-A, a spur of State Highway Route 6 (now U.S. Route 46) from Dover to Ross Corner. The designation was assigned in 1938, eleven years after the then-current highway system in New Jersey was started. The state highway route designation remained intact for fifteen years, until January 1, 1953, when the routes in state of New Jersey underwent a large renumbering. Route 6-A became Route 15, running along Route 181's alignment from Jefferson to Sparta. The Sparta Bypass was constructed in 1974, and upon completion, Route 15 was taken off of the Jefferson–Sparta alignment, which was re-designated Route 181.

== Major intersections ==
County	Location	mi	km	Destinations	Notes
Morris	Jefferson Township	0.00– 0.69	0.00– 1.11	Espanong Road / Route 15 – Sparta, Dover	Cloverleaf interchange; southern terminus
Sussex	Sparta Township	5.82	9.37	CR 517 (Sparta Avenue) to I-80 / Route 15 – Andover, Franklin	
Sussex	Sparta Township	7.47	12.02	Route 15	Northern terminus
1.000 mi = 1.609 km; 1.000 km = 0.621 mi
