= New Jersey Route 31 =

Highway in New Jersey

Route 31
- Route 31 highlighted in red

Route information
- Maintained by NJDOT and City of Trenton
- Length: 48.93 mi (78.75 km)
- Existed: 1967–present

Major junctions
- South end: US 206 / US 1 Bus. in Trenton
- I-295 in Hopewell Township; US 202 in East Amwell; Route 179 in East Amwell; US 202 / Route 12 in Flemington; I-78 / US 22 in Clinton Township; Route 173 in Clinton Township; Route 57 in Washington
- North end: US 46 in White Township

Location
- Country: United States
- State: New Jersey
- Counties: Mercer, Hunterdon, Warren

Highway system
- New Jersey State Highway Routes; Interstate; US; State; Scenic Byways
← US 30	→ Route 32
← Route 68	Route 69	→ Route 70

Route 31 is a state highway in New Jersey, United States. It runs 48.93 miles (78.75 km) from U.S. Route 206/U.S. Route 1 Business (US 206/US 1 Bus.) in Trenton, Mercer County, north to an intersection with US 46 in the Buttzville section of White Township, Warren County. Along the way, Route 31 heads through the communities of Flemington, Clinton, and Washington. Most of the highway is state-maintained; however, the section within the city limits of Trenton is maintained by the city. Much of Route 31 is a two-lane highway that passes through farmland, woodland, and mountainous areas. Two portions of the route—from Trenton to Pennington and from Ringoes to Clinton—consist of more development.

The highway was constructed from 1926 to 1935. Route 31 has carried two different numbers in the past. It was known as Route 30 between 1927 and 1953, when it was renumbered to Route 69 to avoid conflicting with US 30 in southern New Jersey. It was renumbered to Route 31 in 1967 due to sign theft that resulted from the sexual meaning of the number 69. There were plans made in the late 1960s and early 1970s to build a freeway in the Route 31 corridor that would begin in the Trenton area and extend as far north as Interstate 84 (I-84) in Port Jervis, New York; however, it was canceled in the mid-1970s due to opposition from area residents and environmental and financial constraints. In recent years, the portion of Route 31 between Flemington and Clinton has been widened to four lanes. In addition, there was a failed project to build a bypass of Flemington that would have also eliminated the Flemington Circle.

== Route description ==
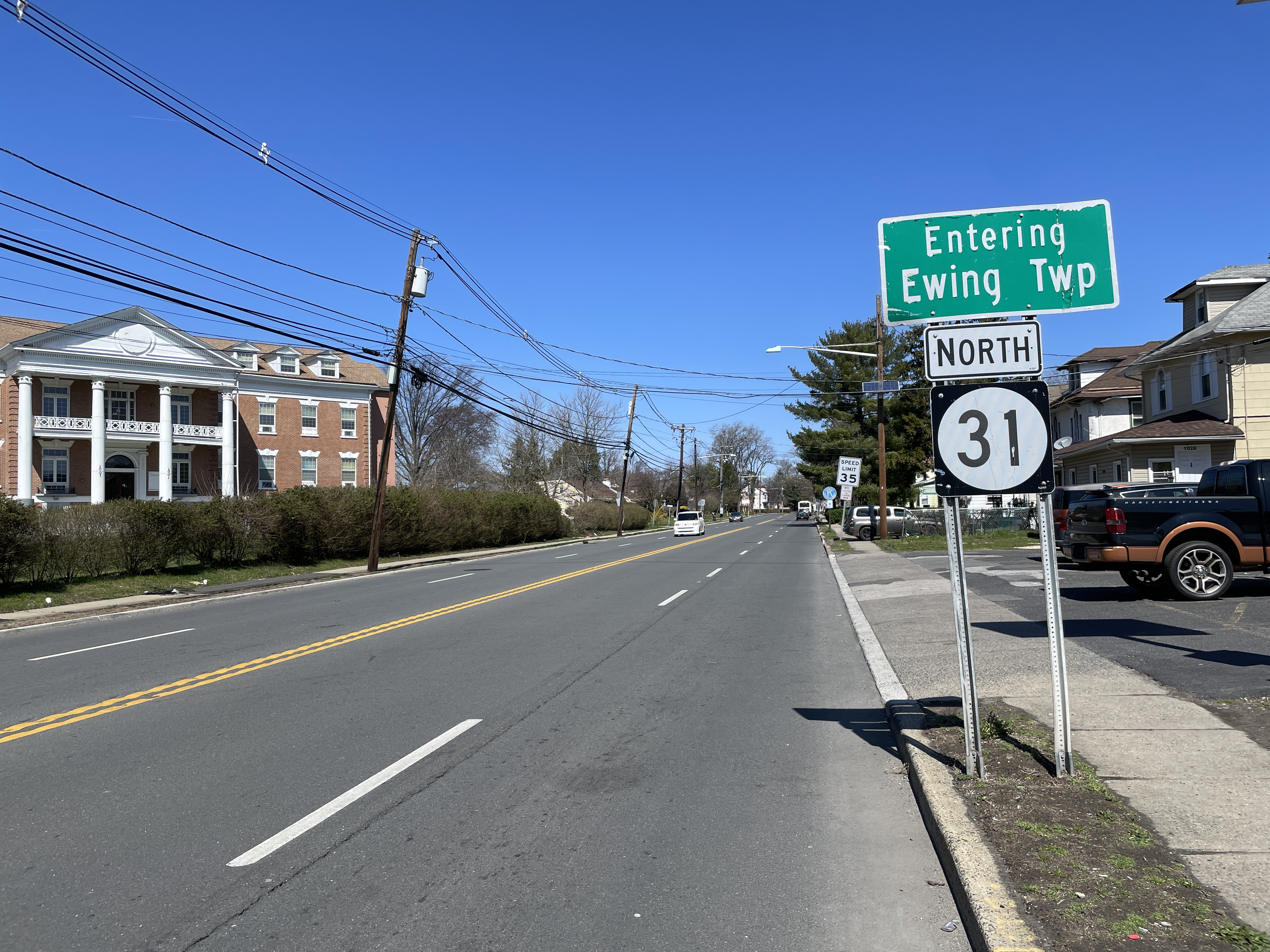
View north along Route 31 at the border of Trenton and Ewing where state maintenance begins

Route 31 heads north from US 1 Bus./US 206 at the Trenton Battle Monument in Trenton, Mercer County, on city-maintained two-lane undivided Pennington Road. The route passes by residences and some businesses in the northern part of Trenton, crossing the intersection with Calhoun Street (CR 653). Route 31 enters Ewing and becomes state-mantainted at the point where it crosses the intersection with Parkway Avenue (County Route 634 [CR 634]). The route continues north through suburban residential areas and passes to the west of The College of New Jersey campus. It crosses into Hopewell Township and briefly becomes a four-lane divided highway as it intersects I-295. Past this interchange, Route 31 continues north as an undivided road through a mix of residences with some businesses, meeting the intersection with Washington Crossing–Pennington Road/Blackwell Road (CR 546) and Pennington Road (CR 640) at a traffic circle. It continues past the circle as a two-lane, undivided road and bypasses Pennington to the west. The route briefly skirts into Pennington twice, where it is a divided highway as it crosses over CSX's Trenton Subdivision railroad line. Route 31 enters Pennington again before heading back into Hopewell Township. Here, the road meets the intersection with North Main Street (CR 640) and heads north into farmland and woodland with some homes. It eventually turns to the northwest and crosses the intersection with Lambertville–Hopewell Road (CR 518).

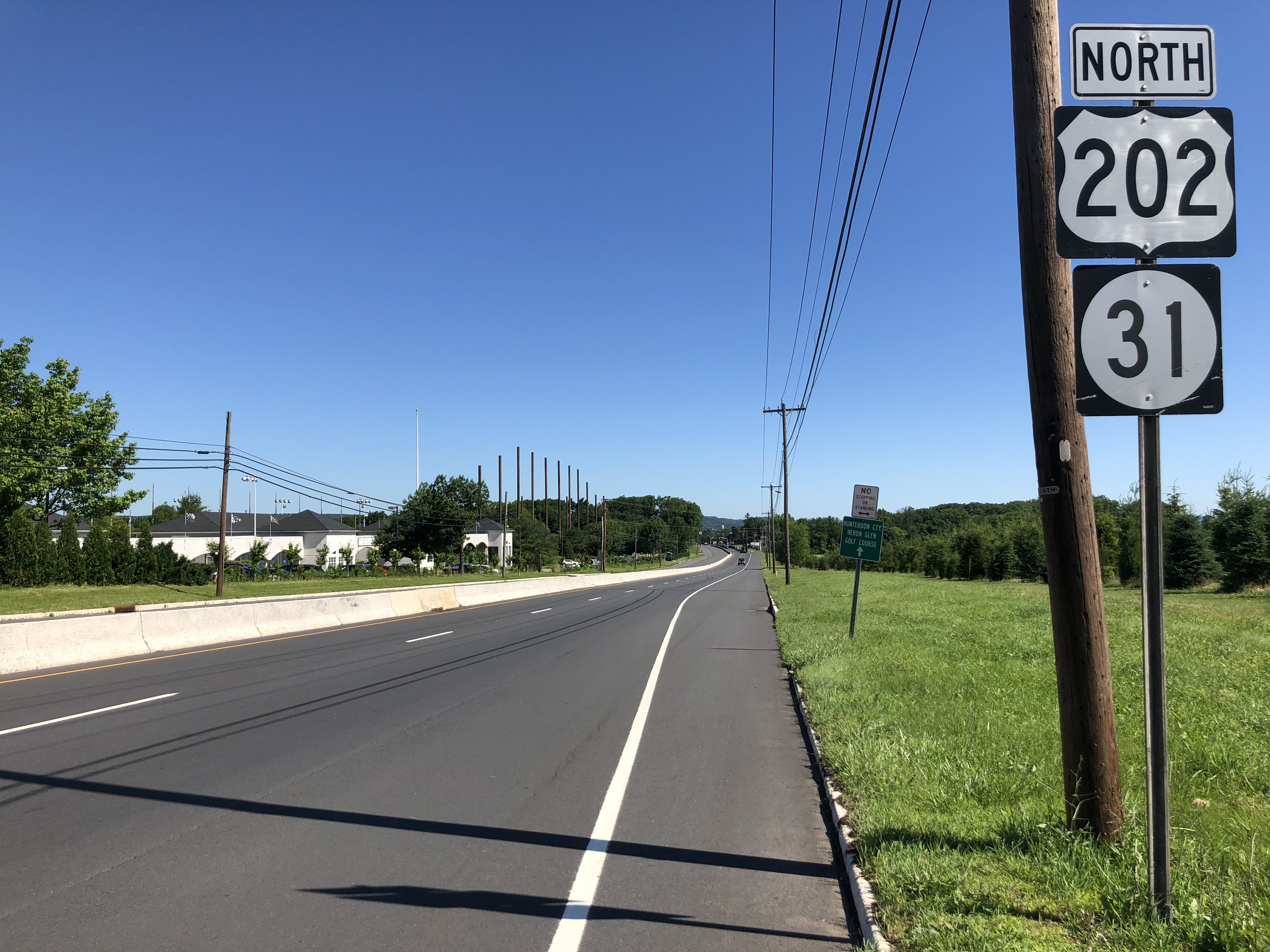
US 202/Route 31 northbound in Raritan Township

Upon crossing the intersection with Lambertville–Hopewell Road (CR 518), Route 31 enters East Amwell, Hunterdon County, and continues through rural areas. The route eventually forms the border between East Amwell and West Amwell and intersects with Harbourton Road (CR 579). The two routes run concurrently to the northwest, becoming a three-lane road with a center left-turn lane that crosses entirely into East Amwell before resuming along the border of East and West Amwell townships. The road becomes a divided highway and crosses entirely into East Amwell again before it comes to an interchange with US 202, where CR 579 continues north into Ringoes and Route 31 heads north along US 202, a four-lane, divided highway with intersections featuring jughandle ramps.

US 202/Route 31 heads to the north, coming to an intersection with Old York Road, which heads to the southwest as Route 179 and to the northeast as CR 514. Past this intersection, the road forms the border between East Amwell to the west and Raritan Township to the east before crossing entirely into Raritan Township. The road continues north through farms, reaching commercial development as it approaches the Flemington area. The road widens to six lanes and crosses into Flemington. The road comes to the Flemington Circle where US 202 continues to the northeast, Route 12 heads to the west, and Route 31 continues to the north on a five-lane, undivided road.

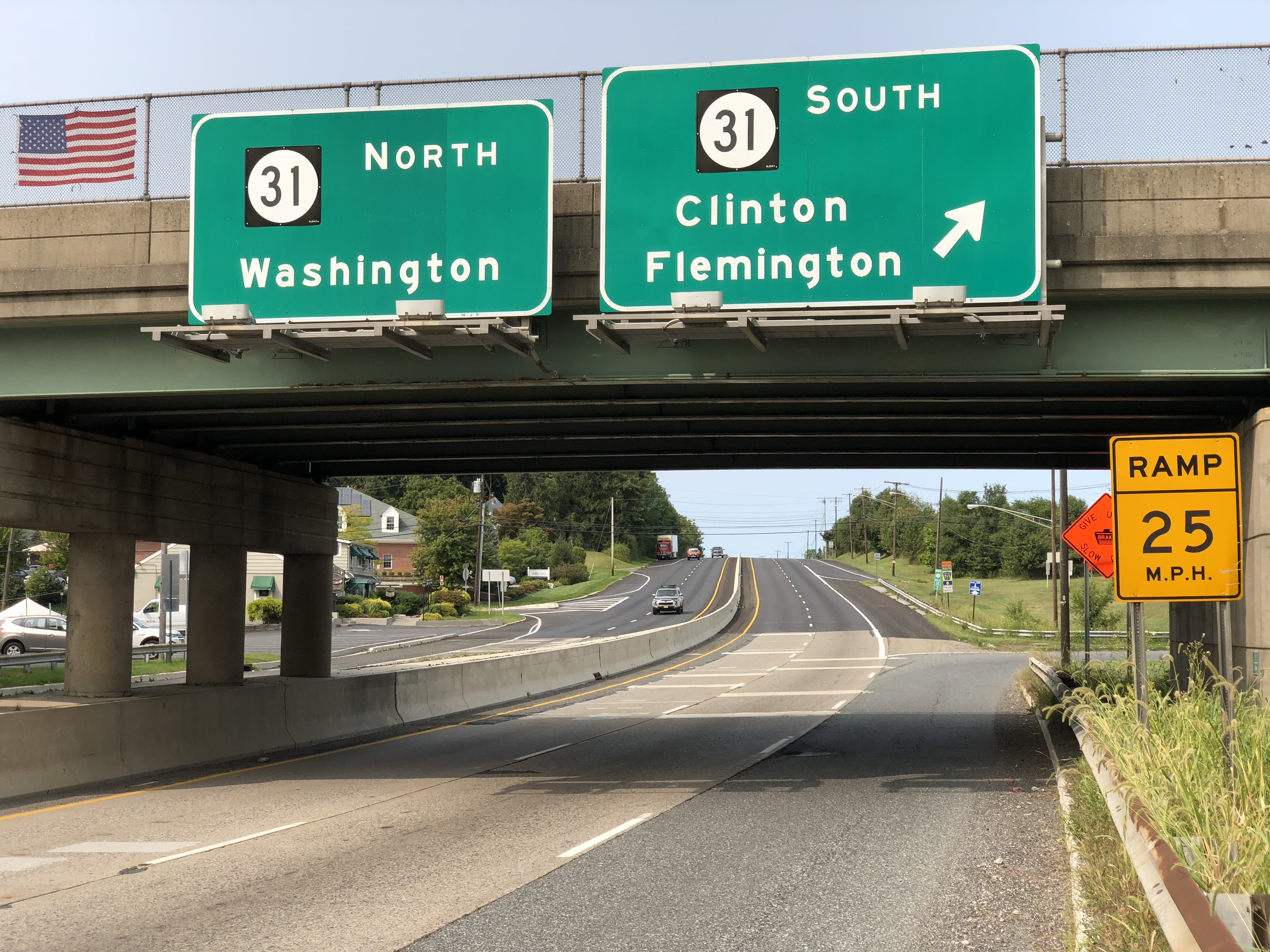
Route 31 northbound past I-78/US 22 in Clinton Township

The route crosses back into Raritan Township, where it passes under the Black River and Western Railroad and briefly becomes a four-lane divided highway before reentering Flemington. Not long afterward, it heads into Raritan Township again, where it crosses the intersection with Walter E. Foran Boulevard (CR 523) and passes by the former site of Flemington Speedway, now a commercial development called Raritan Town Square. Route 31 passes through suburban development before turning into a four-lane, divided highway with some intersections controlled by jughandles and crossing over Norfolk Southern Railway's Lehigh Line and the South Branch of the Raritan River into Readington. It continues north through a mix of farms and wooded areas with some residential areas, crossing into Clinton Township.

Route 31 comes to an interchange with I-78/US 22, with a park and ride lot located to the northwest of the interchange. Past here, the route turns to the northwest into a more developed setting and has an interchange with Route 173. The road runs through Clinton, where it crosses the South Branch Raritan River again. Back in Clinton Township, Route 31 intersects with Halsted Street (CR 513), forming a concurrency with that route and running along the eastern shore of Spruce Run Reservoir. CR 513 splits from Route 31 by heading north on West Main Street, and Route 31 continues north, narrowing to a two-lane undivided road. The route crosses into Lebanon Township, where it heads northwest across the wooded Musconetcong Mountains. Route 31 passes through Glen Gardner, which it enters upon crossing Sprunce Run, before heading into Hampton, where it heads west through that community as a three-lane road with two southbound lanes and one northbound lane and passes over an abandoned railroad line.

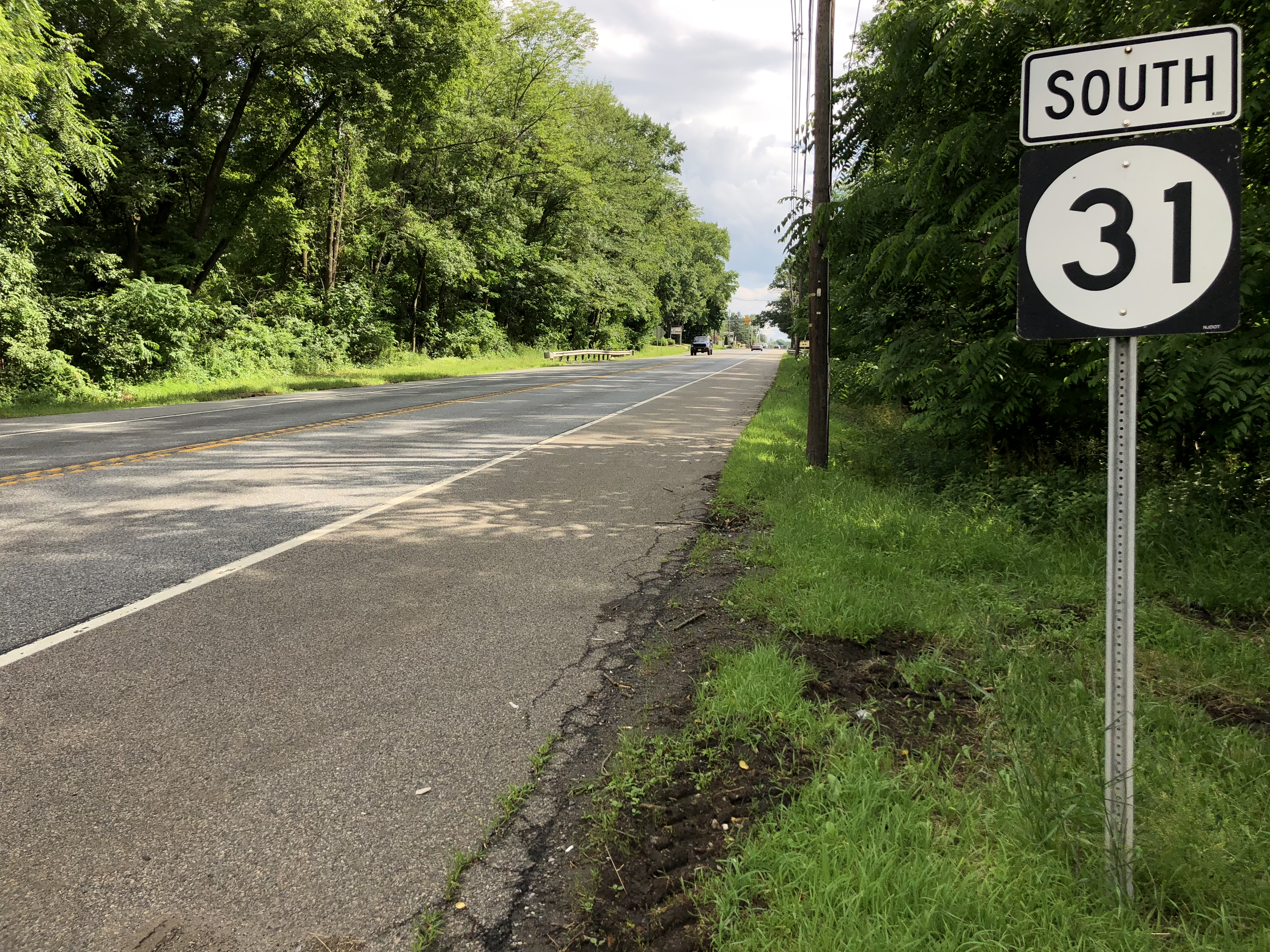
Route 31 southbound past CR 628 in Washington Township

Route 31 crosses the Musconetcong River into Washington Township, Warren County, where it heads north into the agricultural Musconetcong Valley. It heads into Washington Borough, where the road becomes four lanes, passing under the Washington Secondary railroad line that is owned by Norfolk Southern and operated by the Dover and Delaware River Railroad and crossing the intersection with Washington Avenue (Route 57). Past the intersection with Washington Avenue (Route 57), Route 31 narrows to three lanes, passing under the Dover and Delaware River Railroad line, and becomes a two-lane road again as it crosses back into Washington Township at the intersection with Essex Road. It heads into farmland before turning northwest and heading across the Oxford Mountain, entering Mansfield Township. While crossing the Oxford Mountain, Route 31 skirts along the border between Mansfield Township and Washington Township. The route enters Oxford Township, where it heads through the community of Oxford as a four-lane road. Route 31 continues north through a mix of woods and agricultural areas past Oxford, crossing into White Township at the intersection with East Quarry Road and coming to its northern terminus at the intersection with US 46.

== History ==
=== Old roads and construction ===
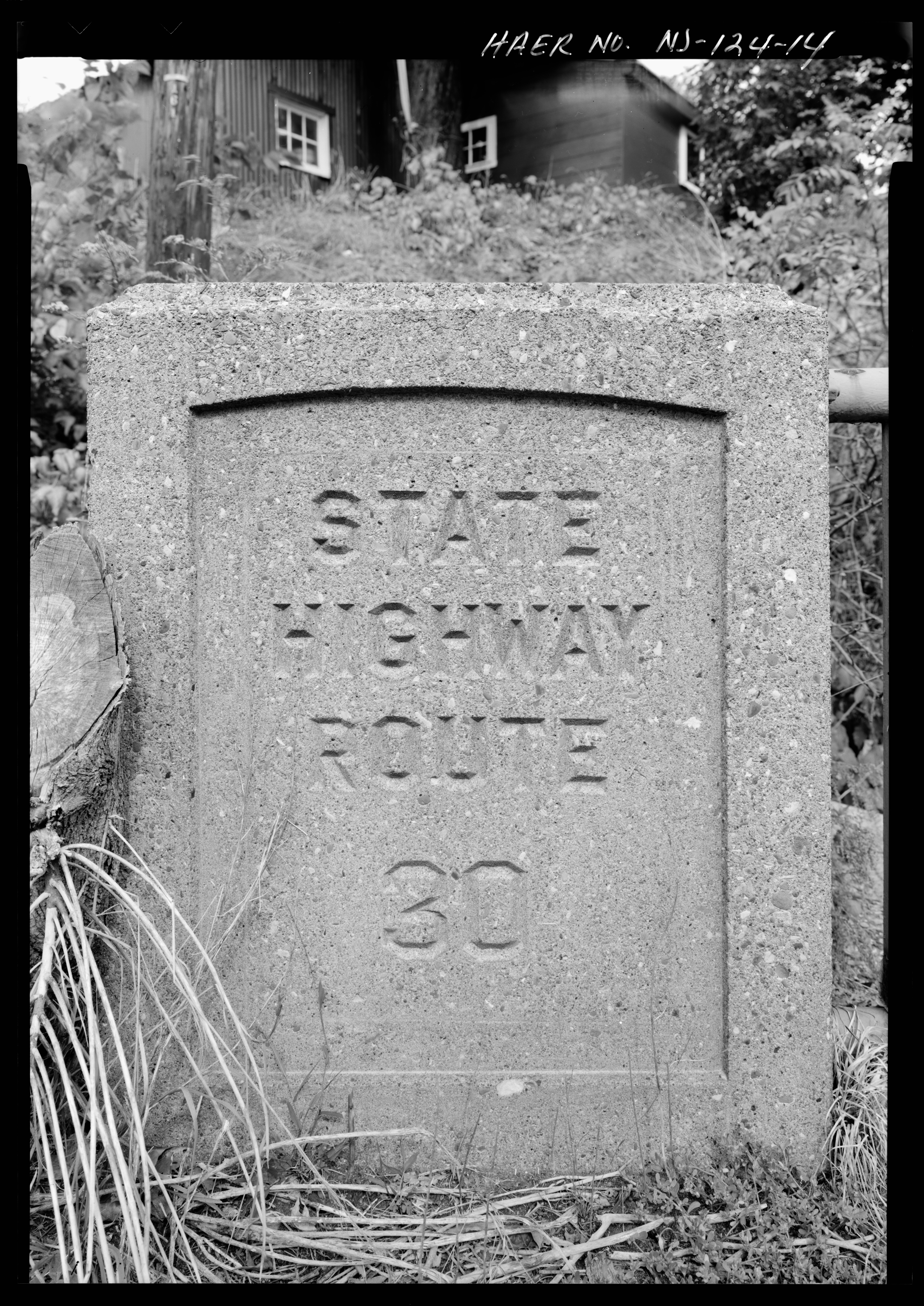
A bridge in Hampton in 1998 of NJ State Highway Route 30, constructed in 1934

Before the state received ownership of Route 31, the portion of the highway from Clinton to Oxford was part of the Spruce Run Turnpike. The turnpike was chartered by the New Jersey State Assembly on February 6, 1813, and was maintained and tolled by the Spruce Run Turnpike Company. The turnpike served as a connector along the old Hopewell Road from modern-day Lambertville (then called Georgetown) to New Brunswick. The road also served as a highly used connector route for the Jersey and Castenoga wagon lines, which served both of the aforementioned communities. The route from Trenton to Pennington was part of the Pennington Turnpike, another privately maintained pre-designation highway. The turnpike was chartered on March 17, 1854, by the General Assembly along an alignment of the old Pennington Road. The turnpike road was to be constructed no further than 32 feet (9.8 m) in breadth, and to be made out of stone, plank or gravel. The turnpike cost one cent for every carriage or sled pulled by horses or mules (and one cent more for every animal), five mills for horse and rider and every dozen of pigs and sheep. It cost two cents to move a dozen cattle, mules or horses. Fines were levied as high as $10 (equivalent to $360.00 in 2025) to anyone who vandalized any structure along the turnpike. If the company did not construct their highway in six years, the state would then take over and make it a public highway. On November 1, 1898, the seven-mile-long (11 km) turnpike, made mostly of stone, was taken over by the state at a cost of $31,661.87 (equivalent to $1.04 million in 2025). Repairs were slated to be completed on the road by October 31, 1899. Also on March 17, 1854, the state legislature made the charter official for the Hopewell and Ewing Turnpike, which used the portion of Route 31 from Pennington to the current-day intersection with CR 654. The turnpike was taken over by the state in 1897 and the privately maintained company was dissolved.

Route 30
- Location: Trenton–Buttzville
- Existed: 1927–1953

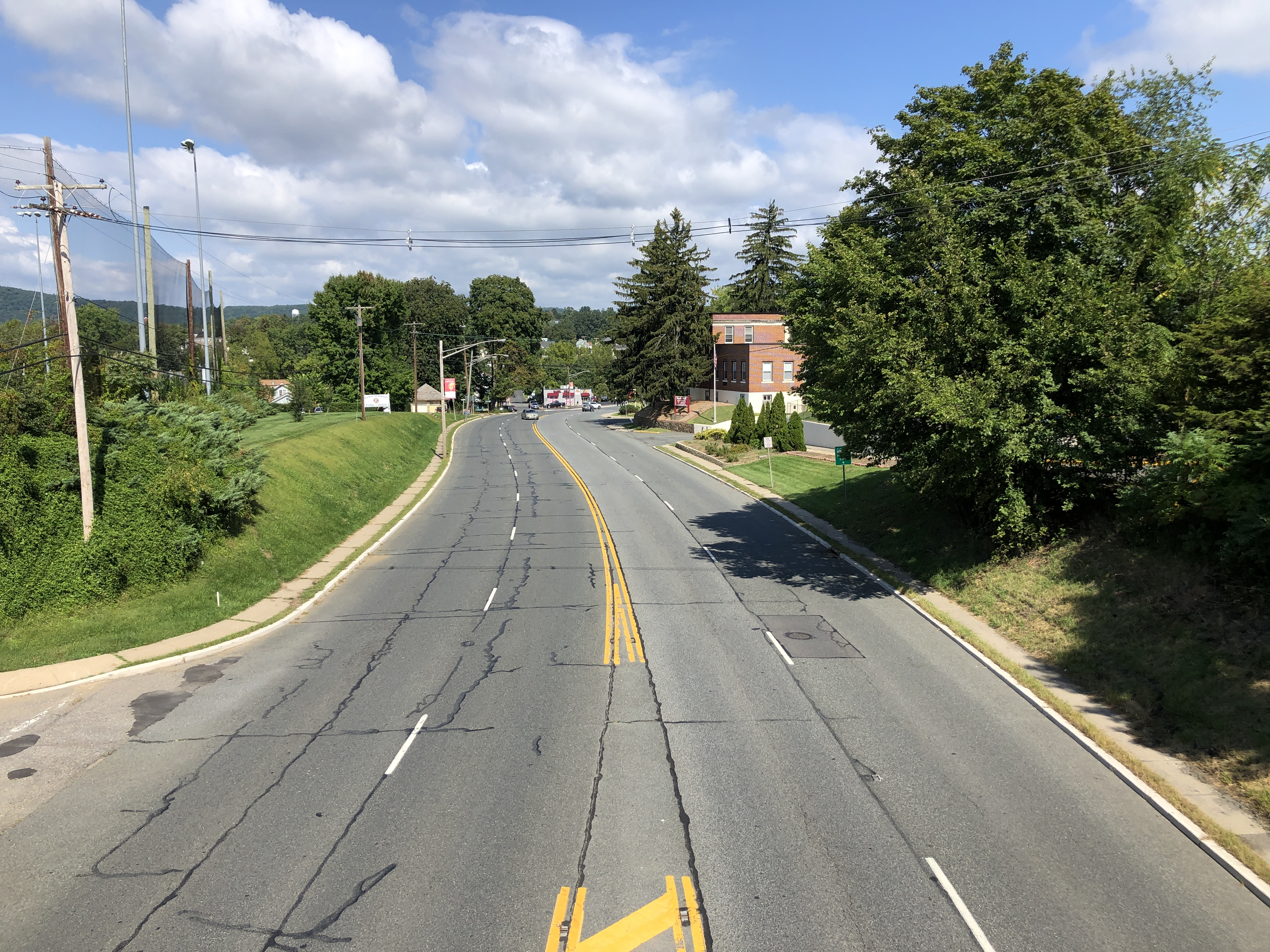
Route 31 northbound in Washington

The formation of current-day Route 31 began around 1916, when a portion of the highway, along the community of Hampton was taken over by the state and was repaired to state standards for $300 (equivalent to $6,122 in 2025). In 1923, the state of New Jersey passed the Good Roads Act, which greatly expanded the state highway system in New Jersey. This act took over pre-existing highways and rebuilt them to a standard mandated by the state. Construction began on Route 31 in 1926, when the State Highway Department began work at the southern terminus in Trenton. A total of 11 bridges were constructed along the highway during this time, signifying the route's construction northward. The oldest ones, dating back to 1926, were located in Ewing and Oxford Township. The one in Ewing was along the first portion of the highway to be constructed.

By 1929, the construction had reached Lawrence Township, where another long stretch of highway was built. During 1930, the construction had reached Clinton, Glen Gardener, and Washington. Construction of the highway progressed northbound, with sections of the Mercer-Hunterdon-Warren route reaching Hunterdon County in 1931. The Hunterdon County portion up to the Musconetcong River was constructed for six months, with completion in October 1931. Construction of the highway northward from the Musconetcong River started in October of the same year. The mainline construction reached the northern terminus in Buttzville in 1932. The route, although the construction had reached its northern end, was not complete due to bypasses around Clinton and Pennington were proposed to be built. These bypasses were never constructed, and during 1934, more portions of the highway in Hunterdon County were finished. The route was completed in 1935, providing an uninterrupted route from the capital city of Trenton to northern Warren County.

=== Designation ===
Route 69
- Location: Trenton–Buttzville
- Existed: 1953–1967

What is today Route 31 was defined in the 1927 New Jersey state highway renumbering as Route 30, a highway that began in Trenton and ended in Buttzville. In the 1953 renumbering, Route 30 was renumbered as Route 69, as the number conflicted with US 30 in southern New Jersey. The bypass of Ringoes, shared with US 202, opened in the 1960s. Due to the sexual meaning of the number and resulting sign theft, Route 69 was changed on June 5, 1967, to Route 31 beginning with sign swapping by state crews. The justification for the removal was that people were stealing signs as a trophy for dorm rooms and clubhouses because of their interest in the number 69.

A limited-access freeway was once planned to serve traffic along the Route 31 (then Route 69) corridor. Plans came forth in the 1960s for a highway to run along Route 69 from the in-construction US 1 freeway (then designated Route 174) to the US 202 freeway in Ringoes. The estimated cost to build the highway according to the proposal estimated to $18 million (equivalent to $136 million in 2025), with construction completing in 1975.

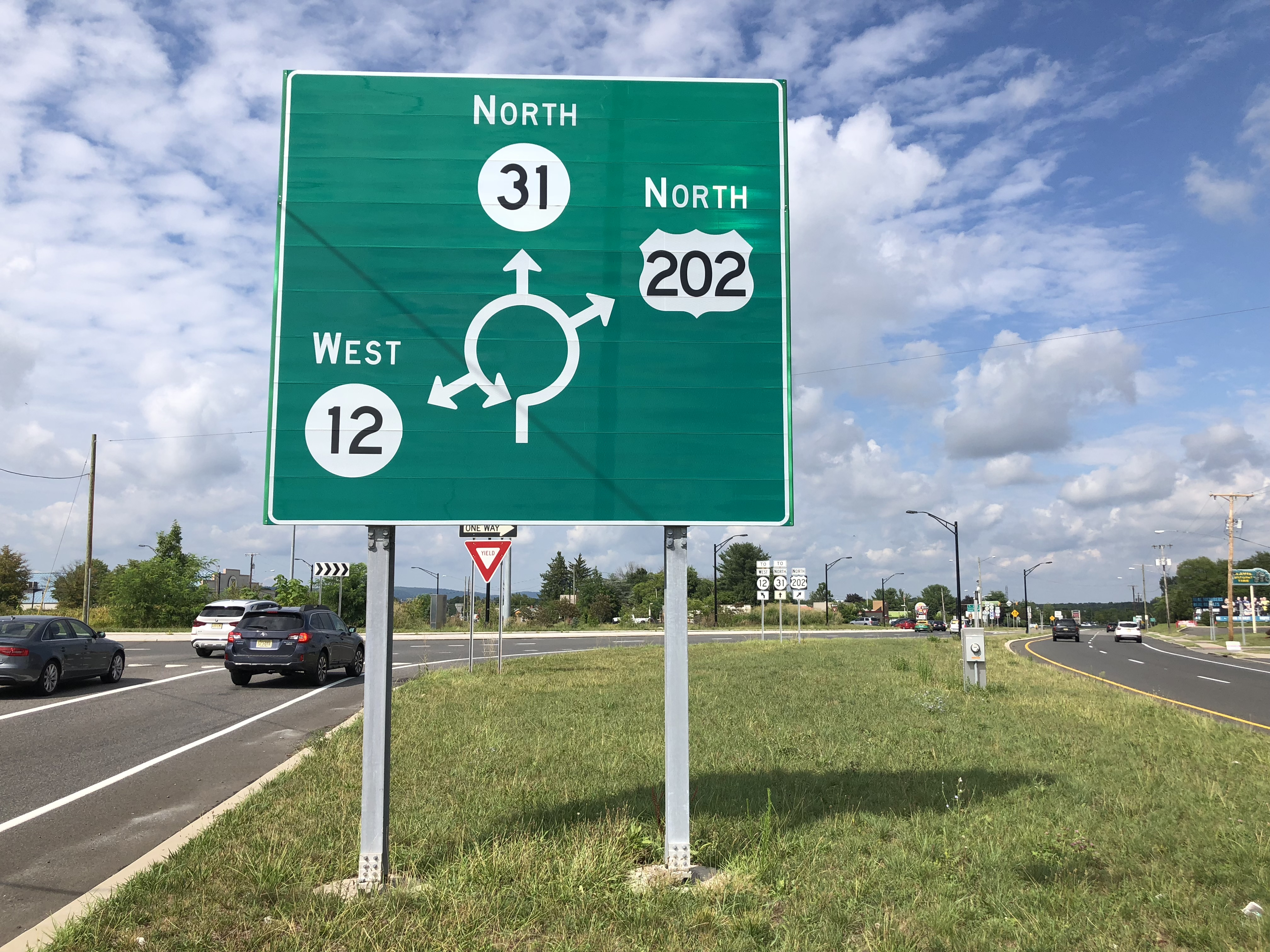
US 202/Route 31 northbound approaching the Flemington Circle

There were plans to extend the freeway further in both directions, including northward to I-80 in Hope Township and southward to I-195. Each of these two extensions were brought forth in the 1960s, and were later shelved due to lack of support. In the early 1970s, a 36-mile-long (58 km) extension of Route 31 was proposed from Oxford, connecting the highway with the proposed Route 23 freeway to I-84 near Port Jervis, New York. This northern freeway extension of Route 31 was to be known as Route F-31 and the Foothills Freeway, and was to run through the Kittatinny Mountains, passing through Stokes State Forest and High Point State Park. The proposal gave an estimated price tag of about $105 million (equivalent to $671 million in 2025). The northern freeway faced high opposition from residents living in Warren and Sussex counties, who feared environmental damage. A group called Opponents of the Foothills Freeway formed to prevent the road from being built. Along with the growing opposition, environmental and financial issues arose, causing the New Jersey Department of Transportation to cancel the Route 31 from being built mid-1970s.

Following the completion of New Jersey's portion of I-287 in 1993, more out-of-state tractor trailer drivers began to use the alignment of Route 31 as a toll-free alternative to the New Jersey Turnpike. On July 16, 1999, oversize trucks were banned from using Route 31 as part of a larger statewide ban imposed on New Jersey roads not a part of the National Highway System by Governor Christine Todd Whitman. The legislation had a significant effect on trucks that followed Route 31 as it forced them to use I-287 and the New Jersey Turnpike instead. In the mid-2000s, the portion of Route 31 was widened during extensive construction between Flemington and Clinton that widened the road to four lanes.

=== The South Branch Parkway ===
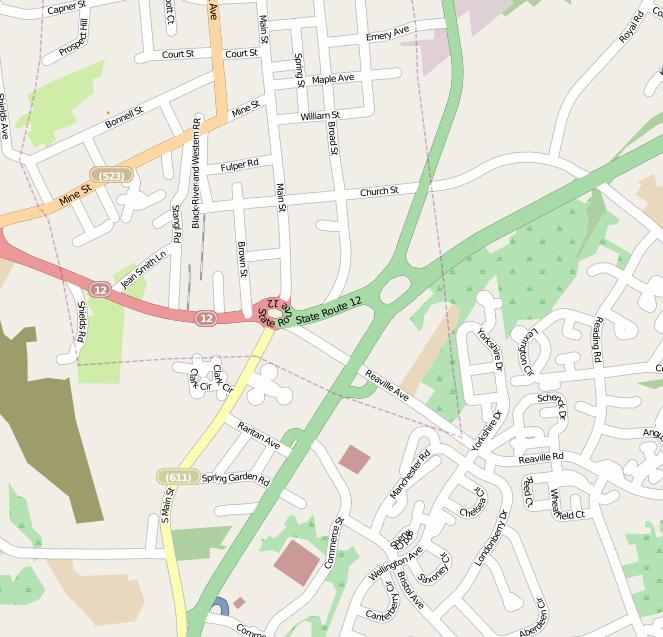
A map of the road system in Flemington, New Jersey from OpenStreetMap

In 2005, the New Jersey Department of Transportation (NJDOT) introduced a case study for Route 31 for its "New Jersey: Future in Transportation" project. Over time, the residents and business owners of Raritan Township and Flemington had growing concerns over the congestion along the highway and US 202. After trying to use vacant land to the east of the current alignment, NJDOT put forth the Flemington Bypass, trying to relieve congestion on Route 31 along the commercial district and to provide access to the industrial land between the two highways and the South Branch of the Raritan River. The project was never completed and the proposed site remains undeveloped. NJDOT is now looking at a scaled-down bypass, proposed as the South Branch Parkway, to connect Route 31 to US 202 in Flemington.

The parkway was to be built as a two-lane alternative to Route 31 defining the border of the suburban and rural portions of Flemington and Raritan Township. Along with the new parkway, a brand-new local street network was proposed to help support the new alignment. These would minimize the pressure of traffic on Route 31 and include better roads for bicycles and pedestrians. More direct routes to different portions of the community would be provided to maintain the community's character. The proposed parkway was to also help upgrade the sensitive history along the river. According to the 2008 highway plans, the South Branch Parkway would cost the state more than $2.2 million (equivalent to $3.23 million in 2025) in funds to put together the survey of lands in the proposed alignment. Some of these funds for the survey were originally intended to go towards the removal of the Flemington Circle.

== Major intersections ==
County	Location	mi	km	Destinations	Notes
Mercer	Trenton	0.00	0.00	US 206 / US 1 Bus.	Southern terminus
Mercer	Hopewell Township	4.85	7.81	I-295 to I-95 south – Princeton, Philadelphia	Exit 72 on I-295; former I-95
Mercer	Hopewell Township	6.09	9.80	CR 546 (Washington Crossing–Pennington Road/Blackwell Rodd) to Route 29 – Washington Crossing, Lawrenceville	Pennington Circle
Mercer–Hunterdon county line	Hopewell–East Amwell township line	12.27	19.75	CR 518 (Lambertville–Hopewell Road) – Lambertville, Hopewell	
Hunterdon	East Amwell–West Amwell township line	13.97	22.48	CR 579 south (Harbourton Road) – Harbourton	Southern end of CR 579 concurrency
Hunterdon	East Amwell Township	16.36	26.33	US 202 south / CR 579 north (Linvale–Harbourton Road) – Ringoes	Northern end of CR 579 concurrency; southern end of US 202 concurrency; intechange
Hunterdon	East Amwell Township	17.53	28.21	Route 179 south / CR 514 east (Old York Road) – Ringoes, Reaville	Northern terminus of Route 179; western terminus of CR 514
Hunterdon	Flemington	22.02	35.44	US 202 north / Route 12 west – Somerville, Newark, Flemington, Frenchtown	Northern end of US 202 concurrency; eastern terminus of Route 12; Flemington Circle
Hunterdon	Raritan Township	23.43	37.71	CR 523 (Walter E. Foran Boulevard) – Flemington, Whitehouse	
Hunterdon	Clinton Township	31.89	51.32	I-78 / US 22 – Phillipsburg, Newark	Exit 17 on I-78
Hunterdon	Clinton Township	32.43	52.19	Route 173 west (Old Highway 22)	Interchange; eastern terminus of Route 173; former US 22
Hunterdon	Clinton Township	33.41	53.77	CR 513 south (Halstead Street) – Clinton	Southern end of CR 513 concurrency
Hunterdon	Clinton Township	34.07	54.83	CR 513 north (West Main Street) – High Bridge	Northern end of CR 513 concurrency
Warren	Washington	42.84	68.94	Route 57 (Washington Avenue)	
Warren	White Township	48.93	78.75	US 46 – Delaware Water Gap, Hackettstown, New York	Northern terminus
1.000 mi = 1.609 km; 1.000 km = 0.621 mi: Concurrency terminus
