= County Route 517 (New Jersey) =

County highway in New Jersey, U.S.

County Route 517
- CR 517 highlighted in red

Route information
- Length: 53.8 mi (86.6 km)
- Tourist routes: Western Highlands Scenic Byway

Major junctions
- South end: CR 523 in Tewksbury
- Route 57 in Hackettstown; US 46 in Hackettstown; I-80 in Allamuchy; US 206 in Andover Township; Route 181 in Sparta Township; Route 23 in Franklin; Route 94 in Vernon
- North end: CR 26 at the New York state line in Vernon

Location
- Country: United States
- State: New Jersey
- Counties: Hunterdon, Morris, Warren, Sussex

Highway system
- County routes in New Jersey; 500-series routes
← CR 516	→ CR 518

County Route 517 (CR 517) is a county highway in the U.S. state of New Jersey. The highway extends 53.8 miles (86.58 km) from Lamington Road / Oldwick Road (CR 523) in Tewksbury to the New York state line in Vernon where it continues as Orange County Route 26. It passes through mostly rural and exurban communities. Its speed limit varies from as much as 50 mph (80 km/h) to as little as 25 mph (40 km/h).

== Route description ==
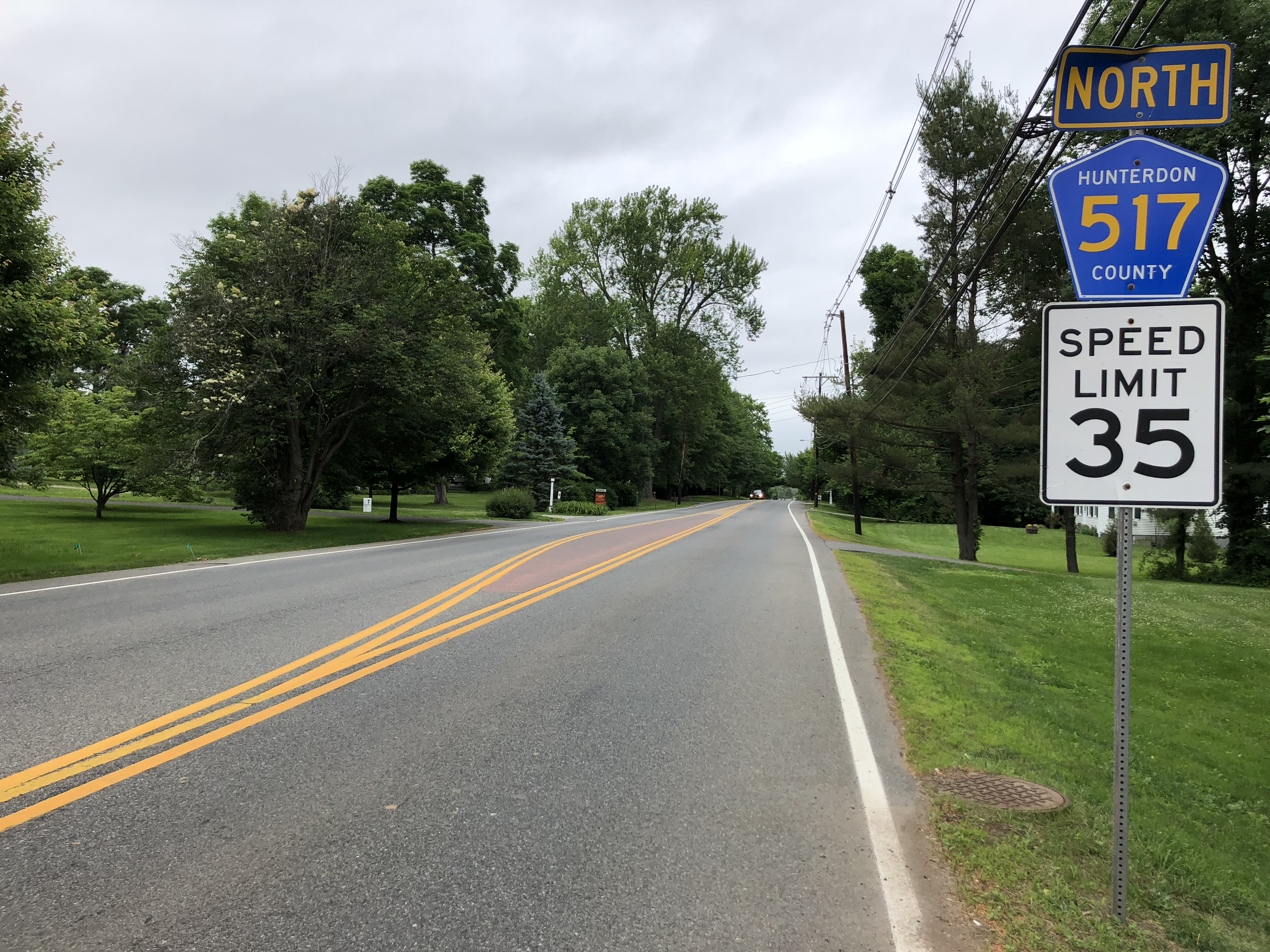
View north at the south end of CR 517 at CR 523 in Tewksbury

CR 517 begins at an intersection with Lamington Road / Oldwick Road (CR 523) in the community of Oldwick in Tewksbury, Hunterdon County, heading north on two-lane undivided Main Street. The road passes homes and businesses before merging onto Joliet Street. At the intersection with King Street/Church Street, the route becomes Old Turnpike Road and leaves Oldwick to head into agricultural areas, curving more to the northwest. CR 517 makes a turn west into woodland before heading north again into a mix of woods, farms, and residential subdivisions. In this area, the route crosses the intersection with Fairmount Road West/Fairmount Road East (CR 512).

A short distance past the intersection of Fairmount Road West/Fairmount Road East (CR 512) in Fairmount, CR 517 crosses into Washington Township, Morris County and becomes Fairmount Road. The route continues through rural areas with residences as it makes a turn to the northwest and reaches the community of Long Valley, where there is an intersection with West Mill Road/East Mill Road (CR 513) in a business area. At this point, CR 517 becomes Schooley’s Mountain Road and is also signed by its former designation of Route 24. The road heads northwest, immediately crossing the South Branch of the Raritan River as it heads into woodland. The road turns west into areas of woods and homes prior to heading north across forested Schooley’s Mountain. After crossing the mountain, CR 517 runs through a mix of farm fields and residential neighborhoods. Upon crossing the Musconetcong River, CR 517 enters Hackettstown in Warren County and immediately intersects the eastern terminus of Route 57. At this intersection, Route 24 signage along CR 517 ends and the county route continues north along with Route 182 on Mountain Avenue, a four-lane undivided road that passes several businesses. Farther north, the road narrows to two lanes and becomes lined with homes. Upon reaching US 46, Route 182 ends and CR 517 turns northwest to run concurrently with US 46 on two-lane Main Street. The road runs through the commercial downtown of Hackettstown, with CR 517 splitting from US 46 by turning north onto High Street.

The road enters residential areas and crosses NJ Transit’s Morristown Line/Montclair-Boonton Line. The road passes to the west of a Mars, Incorporated factory before intersecting with Old Allamuchy Road (CR 654) and leaving Hackettstown for Independence Township. The road becomes unnamed and enters more wooded areas of homes and businesses, intersecting with Bilby Road (CR 665) before coming to another intersection with Old Allamuchy Road (CR 654). CR 517 crosses into Allamuchy and is briefly a three-lane road with two northbound lanes and one southbound lane. The road becomes two lanes again as it continues through forested areas with some agriculture and development, forming the western border of Allamuchy Mountain State Park. The route has an intersection with Old Hackettstown Road (CR 653) before passing Allamuchy Pond and reaching an interchange with I-80. After this interchange, Old Hackettstown Road (CR 667) briefly loops to the west of the road before it continues into more agricultural areas and turns to the northeast.

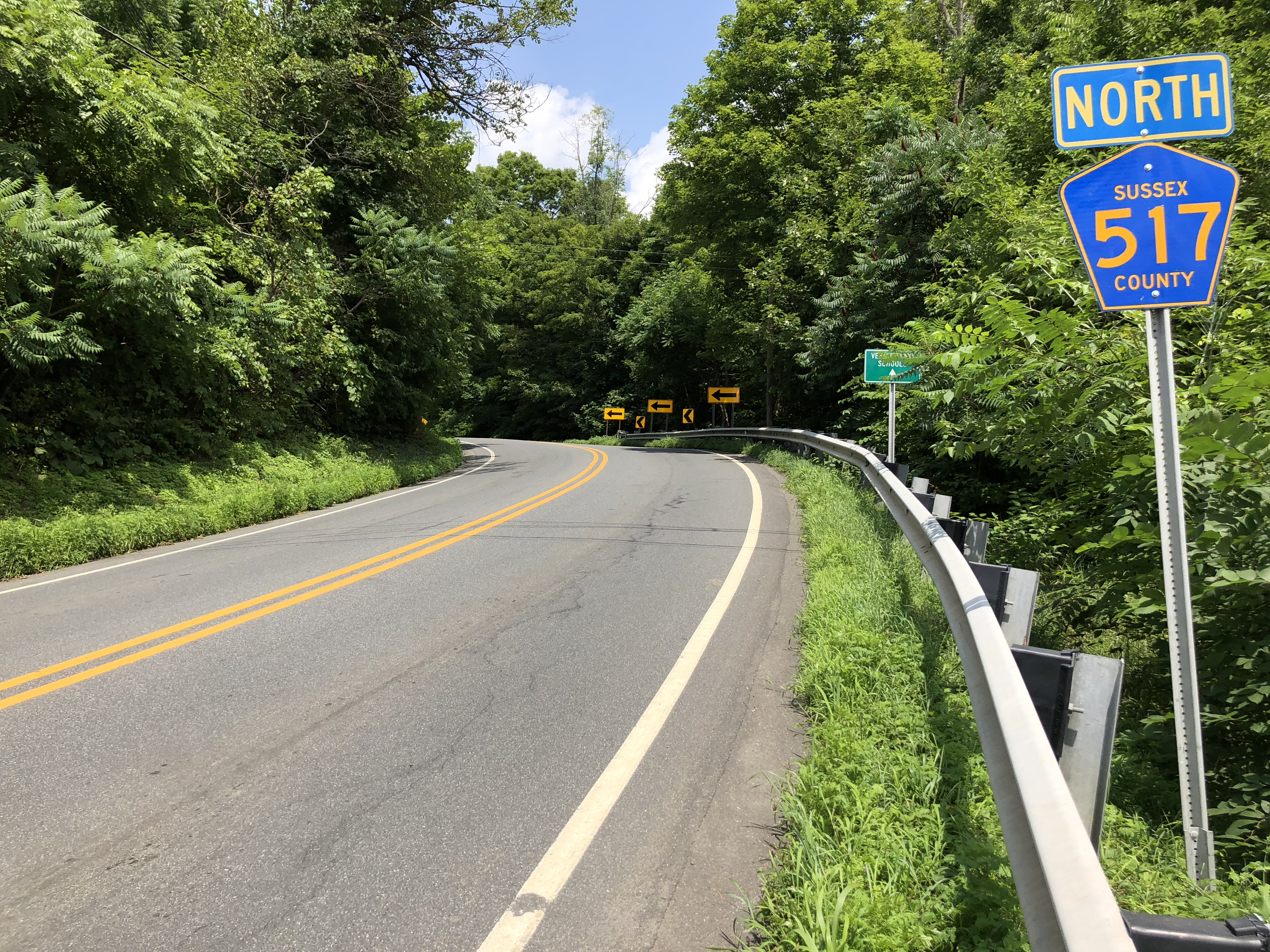
CR 517 northbound past Route 94 in Vernon Township

CR 517 crosses into Green Township, Sussex County, with the name becoming Decker Pond Road, and intersects with Kennedy Road (CR 611) before passing to the northwest of Lake Tranquility, a lake in a wooded area that is surrounded by residential developments. Near the lake, the route has an intersection with Airport Road (CR 603). The road runs through more areas of woodland and farmland as CR 517 makes a right turn onto Whitehall Road prior to making a turn to the left on Decker Pond Road and becoming Tranquility Road. The road enters Andover and becomes Brighton Avenue, passing under the abandoned Lackawanna Cutoff prior to entering residential areas. CR 517 crosses the intersection of Brighton Road (CR 606) before intersecting US 206. At this point, the route turns north to run along US 206 on Main Street briefly through the commercial downtown of Andover before splitting and continuing east on Lenape Road. CR 517 curves northeast at the intersection of Andover-Mohawk Road (CR 613) and enters wooded areas with some farms and homes. The road continues into Andover Township and enters forests with residential developments, passing to the southeast of Lake Lenape. The road turns to the east near Clearwater Lake and becomes Andover-Sparta Road as it runs a short distance to the south of Perona Lake. CR 517 enters Sparta and turns northeast again through more residential areas. The route turns east onto Sparta Avenue at the intersection of Newton-Sparta Road (CR 616) and passes more wooded development as it comes to an intersection with Sparta Avenue/Lafayette Road (Route 181) in a commercial area. A short distance later, CR 517 comes to an interchange with Route 15.

Following this interchange, the route heads northeast and crosses under the New York, Susquehanna and Western Railway's New Jersey Subdivision line and runs immediately to the west of that railroad line as it continues through rural areas with homes. The road intersects with Main Street (CR 620) and becomes unnamed as it turns north away from the railroad and crosses into Ogdensburg. Here, CR 517 becomes Main Street and continues past a mix of forests and residential subdivisions and passes residential and commercial development in the center of town. The road continues north into Franklin, becoming Munsonhurst Road, and runs through more rural areas prior to coming to the intersection of Route 23. CR 517 heads north along with Route 23 and the road continues through residential and commercial areas of Franklin with a brief wide painted median near the intersection of Franklin Avenue (CR 631). The road crosses a stream, Mill Brook, into Hamburg, where CR 517 splits from Route 23 by heading east on Quarry Road.

The road continues through wooded residential neighborhoods prior to entering Hardyston Township. Then, an alternate entrance to Crystal Springs Country Club appears prior to leaving Hardyston Township. At this point, the route becomes Rudeville Road and heads northeast between residential areas to the west and wooded mountains to the east. The road crosses into Vernon, becoming Rudetown Road, and heads through more forests, reaching an intersection of Route 94 near the Mountain Creek ski resort. At this intersection, CR 517 makes a turn to the west onto Route 94 and crosses the New York, Susquehanna and Western Railway line. The county route splits from Route 94 by heading north onto McAfee-Glenwood Road, continuing through a mix of homes and woods. CR 517 intersects with Lake Pochung Road. Less than 1,000 feet (300 m) later, (after Lake Pochung Road,) McPeek Road appears. The road turns northeast and intersects with Drew Mountain Road (CR 641) before heading east and making a turn northeast onto Sandhill Road. The road passes near residential subdivisions before turning north into a mix of farms, woods, and homes, crossing the Appalachian Trail. CR 517 has an intersection with Glenwood Road (CR 565) before coming to the New York state line, where the road continues into Orange County, New York as CR 26.

== History ==
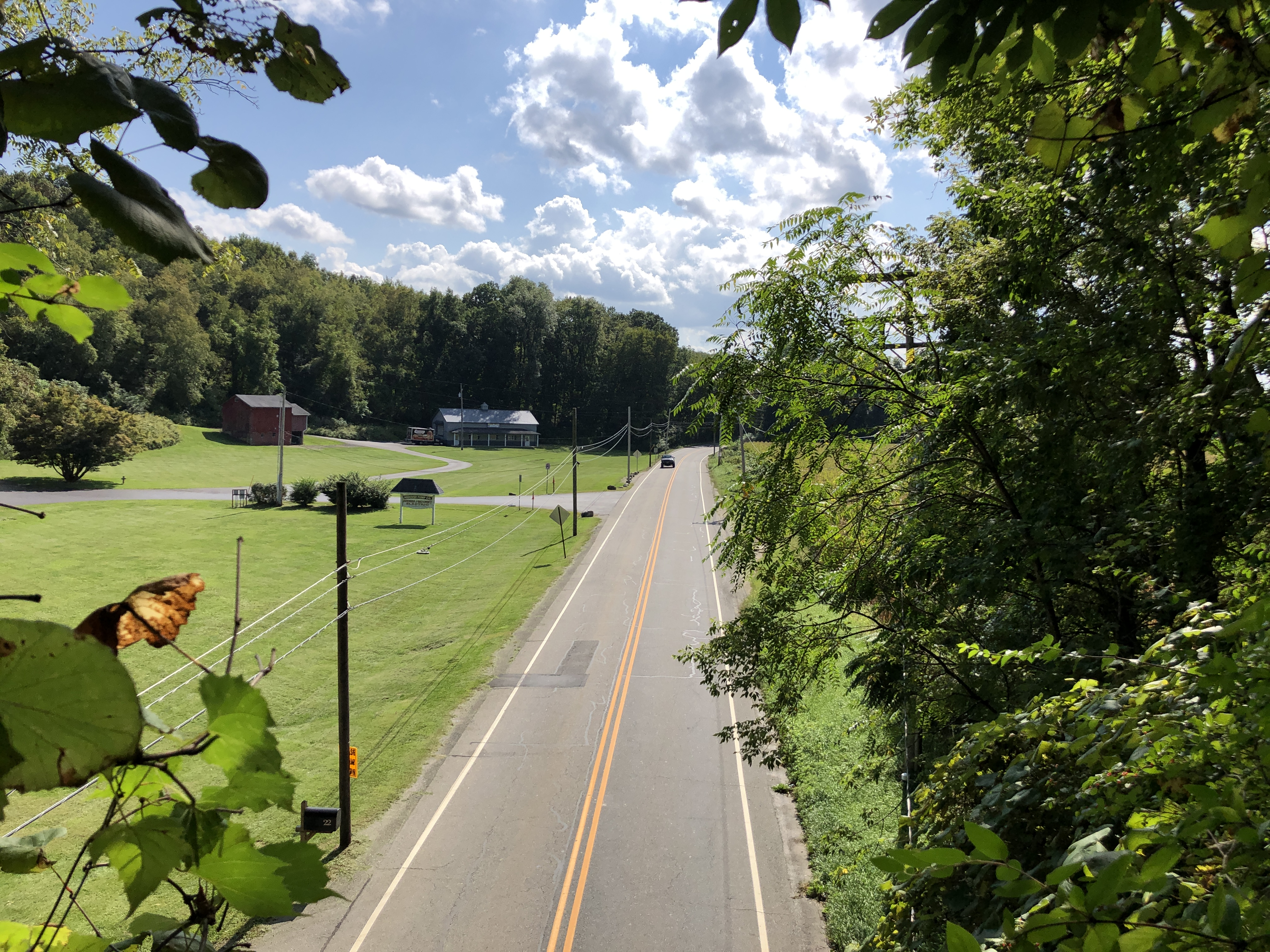
CR 517 southbound viewed from the Lackawanna Cut-off in Andover

The section running from Hackettstown to Long Valley was originally created as part of the Washington Turnpike, which stretched from Morristown to Philipsburg, the road to Hackettstown being a branch of the main turnpike. This road was later incorporated into the William Penn Highway, connecting New York to Pittsburgh. The section of road running from Schooley's Mountain to Long Valley was incorporated into Route 24 in 1927, before being removed by 1992. Between Oldwick and Long Valley, the road was built as part of the New Germantown Turnpike, which was legislated in 1813 to run from the Washington Turnpike to the Jersey Turnpike. South of Oldwick, the turnpike was superseded by County Routes 523 and 665. The Pochuk Turnpike was legislated in 1816 to run north from what is now Route 94 to the New York border.

County Route 517 was designated in 1952. An alternate route, CR 517 Alternate, existed, which is now CR 616, CR 663, Route 94, Route 15, and CR 661.

== Major intersections ==
County	Location	mi	km	Destinations	Notes
Hunterdon	Tewksbury Township	0.0	0.0	CR 523 (Lamington Road / Oldwick Road)	Southern terminus
Hunterdon	Tewksbury Township	5.0	8.0	CR 512 (Fairmount Road) – Califon, Pottersville	
Morris	Washington Township	9.3	15.0	CR 513 (Mill Road) – Middle Valley, Califon, Chester, Morristown	
Warren	Hackettstown	14.4	23.2	Route 57 west – Washington, Phillipsburg Route 182 begins	Eastern terminus of Route 57; southern terminus of Route 182
Warren	Hackettstown	15.4	24.8	US 46 east (Main Street) – Netcong Route 182 ends	Southern end of US 46 concurrency; northern terminus of Route 182
Warren	Hackettstown	15.8	25.4	US 46 west (Main Street) – Delaware Water Gap	Northern end of US 46 concurrency
Warren	Allamuchy Township	20.4	32.8	I-80 – Del Water Gap, Dover	Exit 19 on I-80
Sussex	Andover	27.0	43.5	US 206 south (Main Street) – Netcong	Southern end of US 206 concurrency
Sussex	Andover	27.1	43.6	US 206 north (Main Street) – Newton	Northern end of US 206 concurrency
Sussex	Sparta	34.0	54.7	Route 181 (Lafayette Road / Sparta Avenue) – Milford, Dover	
Sussex	Sparta	34.6	55.7	Route 15 to I-80	Interchange
Sussex	Franklin	39.8	64.1	Route 23 south – Butler	Southern end of Route 23 concurrency
Sussex	Hamburg	42.5	68.4	Route 23 north – Sussex	Northern end of Route 23 concurrency
Sussex	Vernon Township	46.4	74.7	Route 94 north – Vernon	Southern end of Route 94 concurrency
Sussex	Vernon Township	46.8	75.3	Route 94 south – Hamburg, Newton	Northern end of Route 94 concurrency
Sussex	Vernon Township	53.4	85.9	CR 565 south (Glenwood Road)	Northern terminus of CR 565
Sussex	Vernon Township	53.8	86.6	CR 26 north (Glenwood Road)	Northern Terminus, Continuation into New York
1.000 mi = 1.609 km; 1.000 km = 0.621 mi: Concurrency terminus
