= County Route 523 (New Jersey) =

County highway in New Jersey, U.S.

County Route 523
- CR 523 highlighted in red

Route information
- Length: 29.55 mi (47.56 km)
- Existed: January 1, 1953–present

Major junctions
- South end: Route 29 in Stockton
- CR 579 in Delaware Township; Route 12 in Raritan Township; Route 31 in Raritan Township; US 22 in Readington Township; I-78 in Tewksbury Township; CR 517 in Tewksbury Township; US 206 in Bedminster Township
- North end: US 202 in Bedminster Township

Location
- Country: United States
- State: New Jersey
- Counties: Hunterdon, Somerset

Highway system
- County routes in New Jersey; 500-series routes
| ← CR 522 | → CR 524 |

County Route 523 (CR 523) is a county highway in the U.S. state of New Jersey. The highway extends 29.55 miles (47.56 km) from Route 29 in Stockton to U.S. Route 202 (US 202) in Bedminster Township.

== Route description ==
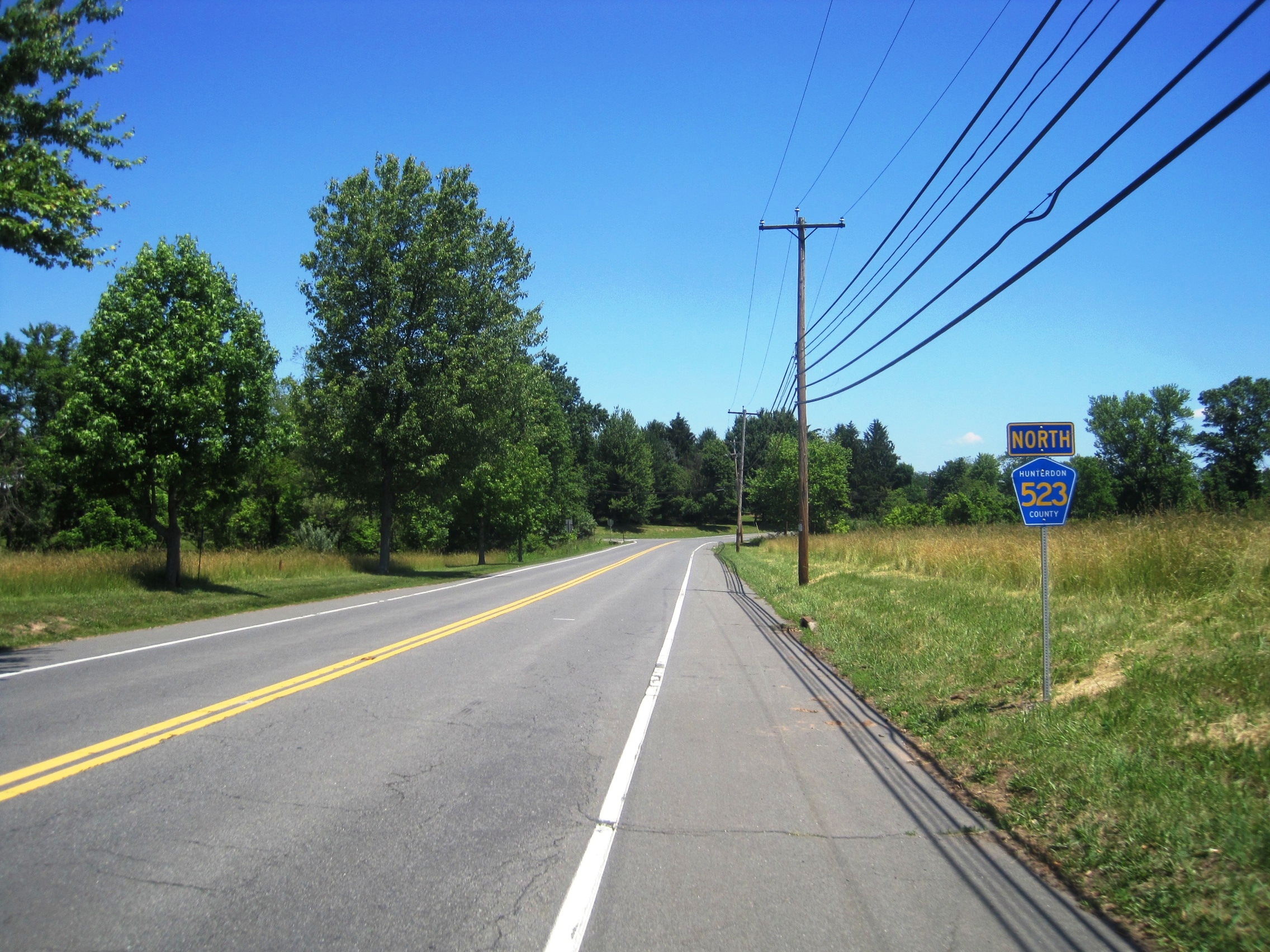
CR 523 northbound past CR 605 in Delaware Township

CR 523 begins at an intersection with Route 29 (Main Street) in Stockton, Hunterdon County, heading northeast on Stockton–Flemington Road through wooded residential areas. The road leaves Stockton for Delaware Township and enters a mix of farms and woods with some homes. The route intersects CR 605 before crossing CR 604 in the residential community of Sergeantsville. CR 523 passes through more rural areas as it comes to a brief concurrency with CR 579. After CR 579 splits to the south, the route enters Raritan Township and enters rural areas with increasing residential subdivisions. CR 523 intersects Route 12 at Dvoor's Circle and crosses into Flemington a short distance later, becoming municipally-maintained Mine Street, which is lined with homes. CR 523 turns north onto Park Avenue, passing more residences along with a few businesses. The route heads northeast on Walter E. Foran Boulevard, crossing back into Raritan Township. At this point, CR 523 resumes county maintenance and becomes a divided highway as it passes residential subdivisions, narrowing back into an undivided road as it turns east and intersects Route 31.

After this intersection, the route becomes unnamed as it passes commercial areas before passing farms and making a turn to the north, becoming county maintained again. The road passes through a mix of homes and businesses parks before heading near more farmland, running a short distance to the west of Norfolk Southern's Lehigh Line. After intersecting CR 612, CR 523 turns east onto Flemington–Whitehouse Road and passes over the Lehigh Line, at which point it runs between the South Branch Raritan River to the north and an industrial facility to the south. The road crosses the South Branch Raritan River into Readington Township, where it turns northeast and then north into a mix of woods, farms, and residential neighborhoods. The route curves to the north-northeast as it crosses CR 629 and continues to the CR 620 intersection near more residential areas. CR 523 comes to the community of Whitehouse Station, where the route becomes Main Street as it passes homes, crossing NJ Transit's Raritan Valley Line near White House station. A short distance later, CR 523 intersects US 22 and turns northwest to form a brief concurrency with that route on a four-lane divided highway. After the US 22 overlap, CR 523 continues north on two-lane undivided Oldwick Road, entering wooded areas with some homes. The road is briefly a four-lane divided highway as it comes to an interchange providing access to the UNICOM Science and Technology Park. The road becomes two lanes and undivided again as it crosses into Tewksbury Township and reaches an interchange with I-78, with a park and ride lot located at the southwest corner. Past this interchange, the route passes a mix of fields and woods with a few residences before coming to the southern terminus of CR 517. At this point, CR 517 heads north and CR 523 makes a right turn to head east on Lamington Road into more rural areas.

After crossing the Lamington River, CR 523 enters Bedminster Township in Somerset County, passing through farmland as it intersects CR 665. From here, the route turns north-northeast and passes through woods and the entrance to Trump National Golf Club Bedminster before heading back into a mix of farms, woods, and homes. Residential development increases as the road comes to a junction with US 206. After passing a mix of homes a businesses, CR 523 ends at the US 202 (Hillside Avenue) intersection.

== History ==
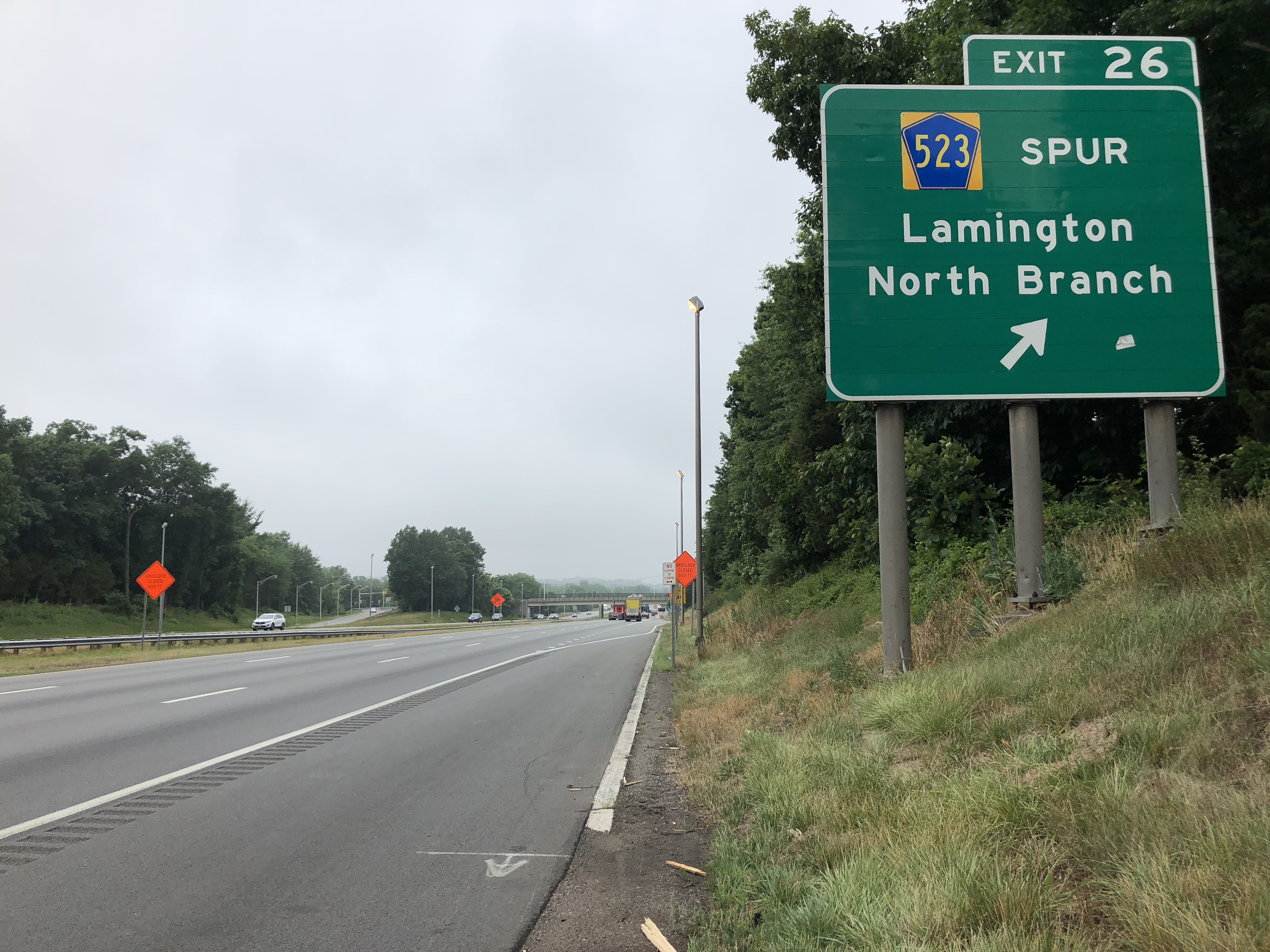
CR 523 Spur sign on I-78 westbound in July 2020

A spur route, County Route 523 Spur, existed, which is now Somerset County Route 665. However, exit signs on Interstate 78 still call the highway CR 523 Spur.

== Major intersections ==
| County | Location | mi | km | Destinations | Notes |
|---|---|---|---|---|---|
| Hunterdon | Stockton | 0.00 | 0.00 | Route 29 (Main Street) – Lambertville, Trenton, Raven Rock, Frenchtown | Southern terminus |
| Hunterdon | Delaware Township | 6.39 | 10.28 | CR 579 north (Ringoes Croton Road) | South end of CR 579 overlap |
| Hunterdon | Delaware–Raritan township line | 6.50 | 10.46 | CR 579 south (Ringoes Croton Road) | North end of CR 579 overlap |
| Hunterdon | Raritan Township | 9.13 | 14.69 | Route 12 – Frenchtown, Somerville | Dvoor’s Circle |
| Hunterdon | Raritan Township | 10.90 | 17.54 | Route 31 – Trenton, Clinton | |
| Hunterdon | Readington Township | 20.36 | 32.77 | US 22 east – Somerville | South end of US 22 overlap |
| Hunterdon | Readington Township | 20.55 | 33.07 | US 22 west – Clinton | North end of US 22 overlap |
| Hunterdon | Readington Township | 21.49 | 34.58 | UNICOM Science and Technology Park | Interchange |
| Hunterdon | Tewksbury Township | 22.52– 22.60 | 36.24– 36.37 | I-78 – Clinton, Newark | Exit 24 (I-78) |
| Hunterdon | Tewksbury Township | 23.68 | 38.11 | CR 517 north (Oldwick Road) – Long Valley, Hackettstown | Southern terminus of CR 517 |
| Somerset | Bedminster Township | 29.31 | 47.17 | US 206 – Netcong, Somerville | |
| Somerset | Bedminster Township | 29.55 | 47.56 | US 202 – Morristown, Somerville | Northern terminus |
1.000 mi = 1.609 km; 1.000 km = 0.621 mi: Concurrency terminus
