= New Jersey Route 57 =

State highway in Warren County, New Jersey, US

Route 57

Route information
- Maintained by NJDOT
- Length: 21.10 mi (33.96 km)
- Existed: January 1, 1953–present
- Tourist routes: Warren Heritage Scenic Byway

Major junctions
- West end: US 22 in Lopatcong Township
- Route 31 in Washington Borough
- East end: Route 182 / CR 517 in Hackettstown

Location
- Country: United States
- State: New Jersey
- Counties: Warren

Highway system
- New Jersey State Highway Routes; Interstate; US; State; Scenic Byways
← Route 56	→ Route 58

Route 57 is a state highway located in Warren County in the U.S. state of New Jersey. It runs 21.10 mi (33.96 km) from an interchange with U.S. Route 22 (US 22) in Lopatcong Township to an intersection with Route 182 and County Route 517 (CR 517) in Hackettstown. The route passes through mostly rural areas of farmland and mountains in Warren County. It also passes through Washington, where Route 57 crosses Route 31. The route is designated a scenic byway, the Warren Heritage Scenic Byway, by the state of New Jersey due to the physical environments it passes through as well as from historical sites along the way such as the Morris Canal.

The current alignment of Route 57 was designated as a part of pre-1927 Route 12 in 1917. In 1927, Route 24 was designated along this route between the Phillipsburg area and Penwell in Mansfield Township while a spur of Route 24 called Route S24 replaced pre-1927 Route 12 between Penwell and US 46 in Hackettstown. When New Jersey renumbered its state highways in 1953, the portion of Route S24 between Penwell and CR 517 in Hackettstown became a part of Route 24 to complete a gap in that route while Route S24 north of there became Route 57. A never-built segment of Route 57 running from the intersection of Route 24 and Route 57 to US 46 east of Hackettstown was legislated in 1965. Around 1970, Route 57 was designated along Route 24 west of Hackettstown while the portion of Route 57 in Hackettstown became Route 182.

== Route description ==
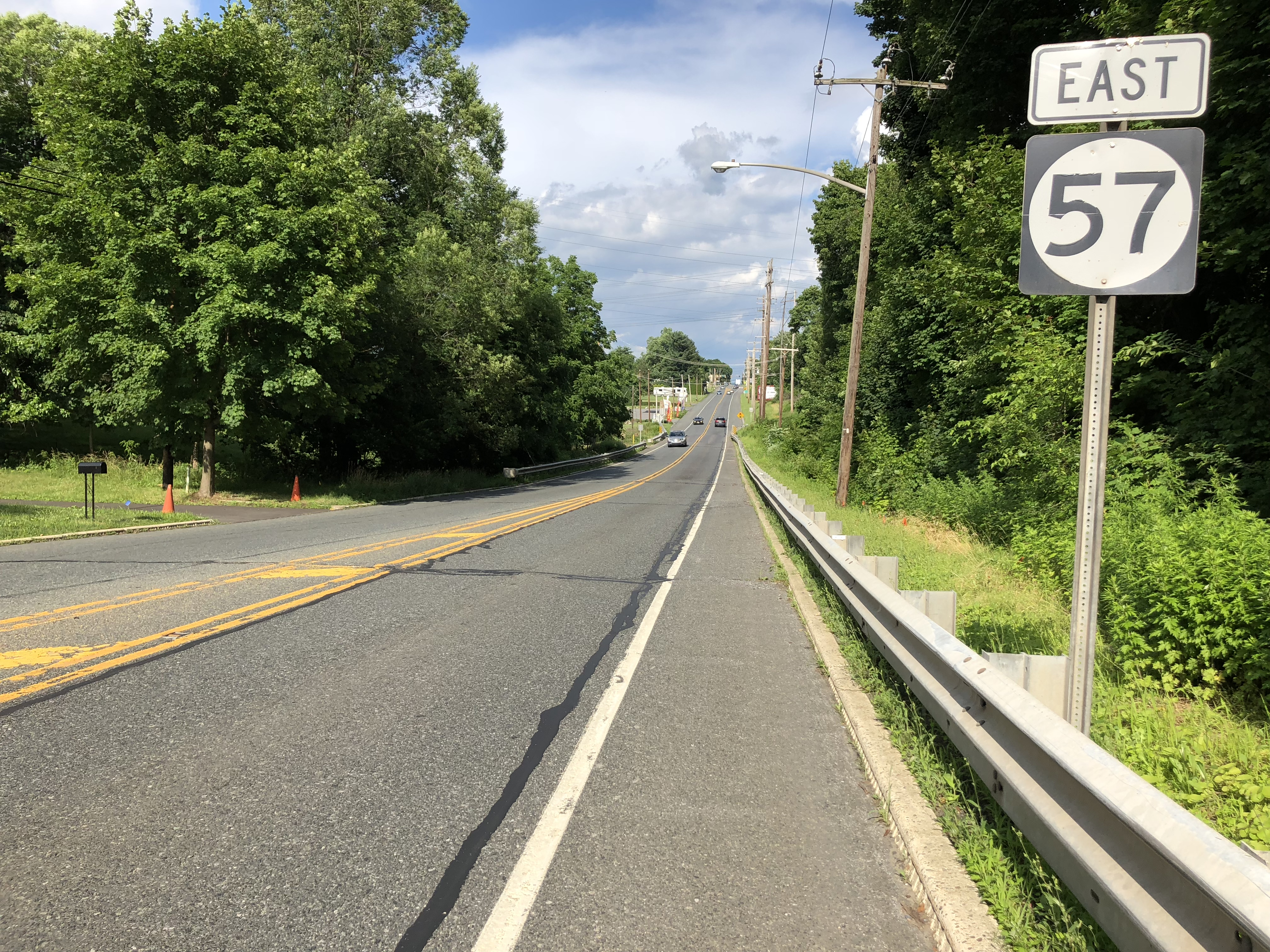
View east at the west end of Route 57 at US 22 in Lopatcong Township

Route 57 begins at an interchange with US 22 in Lopatcong Township, where the only movements possible here between the two highways are westbound Route 57 to westbound US 22 and vice versa. The road heads to the east on the Morris and Essex Turnpike, a two-lane undivided road. The route heads through a mix of businesses and farm fields, with the Washington Secondary rail line that is owned by Norfolk Southern and operated by the Dover and Delaware River Railroad paralleling the road to the south. The railroad line eventually runs farther to the south of Route 57 before the route crosses County Route 519 (Uniontown Road).

Past this intersection, the road heads northeast through farmland within the Pohatcong Creek valley, situated between Pohatcong Mountain to the south and Scotts Mountain to the north. It enters Greenwich Township, where the route crosses County Route 637 (Liberty Road/North Main Street) before passing through residential areas. Route 57 heads into farmland with intermittent residences, crossing into Franklin Township. The route continues to New Village, where residences become more dense. A short distance after the intersection with County Route 633 (Edison Road), Route 57 heads back into farm fields. The road reaches the residential community of Broadway, where it comes to a junction with County Route 643 (Asbury Broadway Road). Route 57 continues through agricultural areas with more residences and businesses, crossing into Washington Township, where it intersects County Route 648 (Little Philadelphia Road) and County Route 623 (Brass Castle Road).

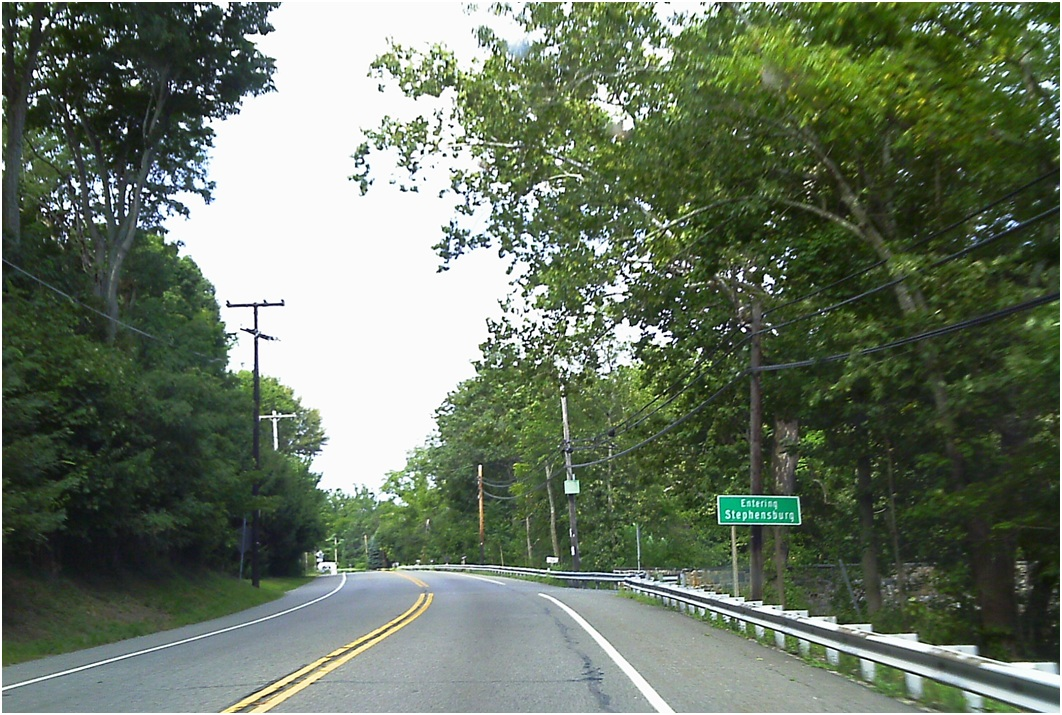
Route 57 eastbound heading into Stephensburg

Past this intersection, Route 57 enters Washington Borough, where it becomes Washington Avenue. Here, the road passes residences and businesses before heading into the commercial downtown of Washington. It crosses Route 31 and heads under a Dover and Delaware River Railroad line, passing through a mix of residences, businesses, and industrial establishments. It crosses back into Washington Township, where Route 57 becomes the Morris and Essex Turnpike again, crossing over the Washington Secondary rail line before intersecting County Route 630 (Washburn Avenue) and County Route 651 (McCullough Road) in Port Colden. From here, the road heads east into a mix of agricultural and residential areas with some businesses, entering Mansfield Township. Here, the route is known as the Admiral John D. Bulkeley Memorial Highway, named after Vice Admiral John D. Bulkeley, a United States Navy officer who served in World War II.

In Mansfield Township, the road passes through the residential community of Anderson and intersects County Route 632 (Anderson Road) and County Route 629 (Port Murray Road). From here, Route 57 turns northeast and parallels the Musconetcong River, heading through wooded areas around Upper Pohatcong Mountain with some farmland. In Stephensburg, the road passes through a wooded residential region and intersects County Route 652 (Watters Road). Past this intersection, the road continues alongside the wooded Musconetcong River, with residential and commercial development increasing past the Hazen Road intersection. Route 57 enters Hackettstown, where it becomes the Morris and Essex Turnpike before coming to its terminus at an intersection with the southern terminus of Route 182 and County Route 517, which continues south from this intersection as well as north along Route 182.

From milepost 2.07 (3.33 km) to its eastern terminus, Route 57 is designated a scenic byway, the Warren Heritage Scenic Byway, by the state of New Jersey due to its mountain and valley scenery, historic districts, and the adjacent Morris Canal, which was built in 1831 and had the greatest elevation change among all canals across the world.

== History ==
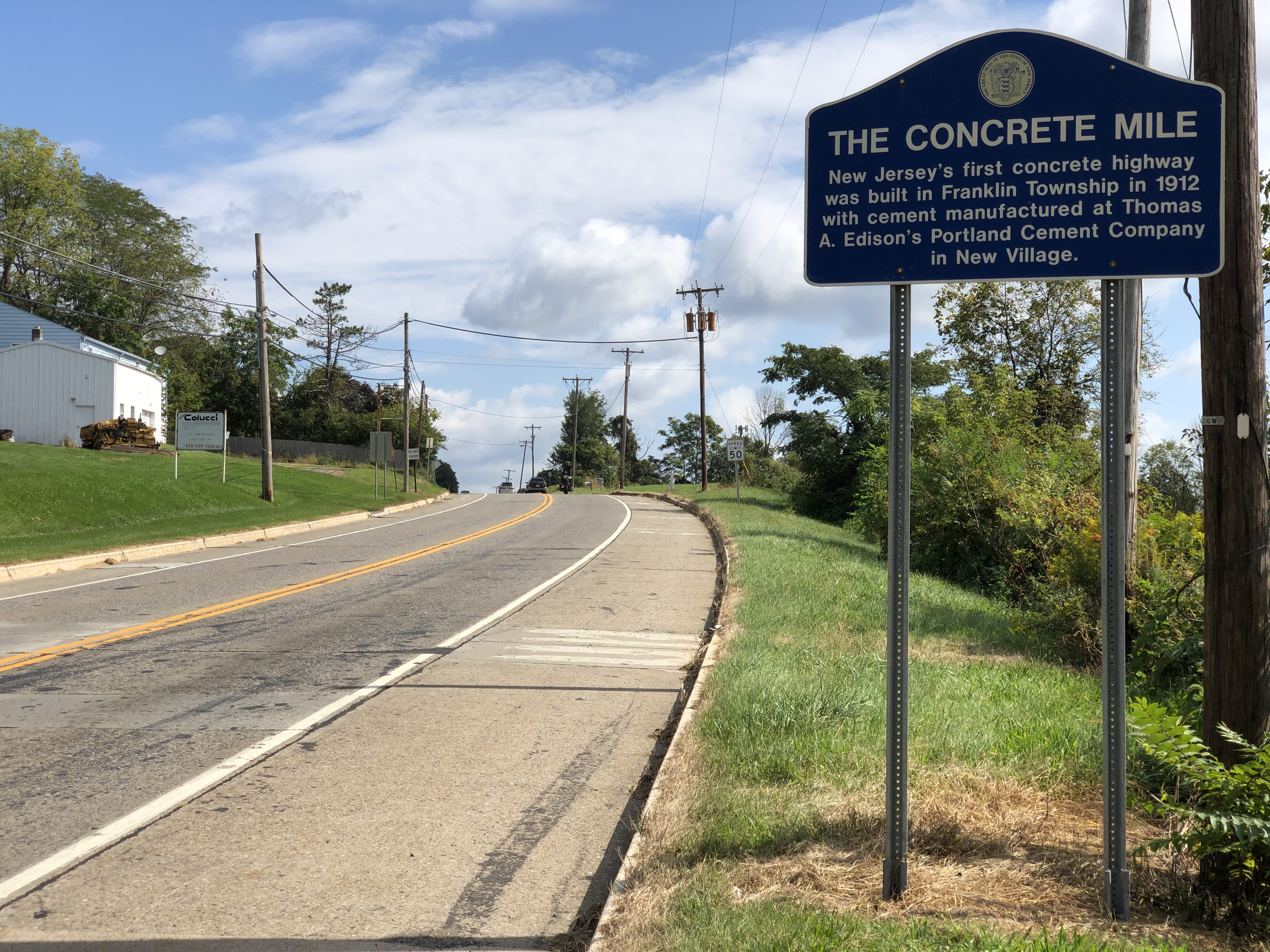
Route 57 eastbound beginning of the Concrete Mile

The present-day alignment of Route 57 west of Penwell was built as a part of the Washington Turnpike, chartered in 1806 to run from Morristown to Phillipsburg. This road was later signed as part of the William Penn Highway in 1916, running from New York City to Pittsburgh. The whole of what is now Route 57 was legislated as a part of pre-1927 Route 12, a route that was designated to run from Paterson west to Phillipsburg in 1917. A one-mile (1.6 km) stretch of the road in Franklin Township was the first concrete road built in New Jersey, having been constructed in 1912. The concrete was supplied by Thomas Edison's Portland cement company and some of the original concrete is still in use on the road today. In the 1927 New Jersey state highway renumbering, this portion of pre-1927 Route 12 west of Penwell in Mansfield Township was legislated as a part of Route 24, a route that was to run from Phillipsburg to Newark, while the portion between Penwell and U.S. Route 46 in Hackettstown was designated as Route S24, a spur of Route 24.

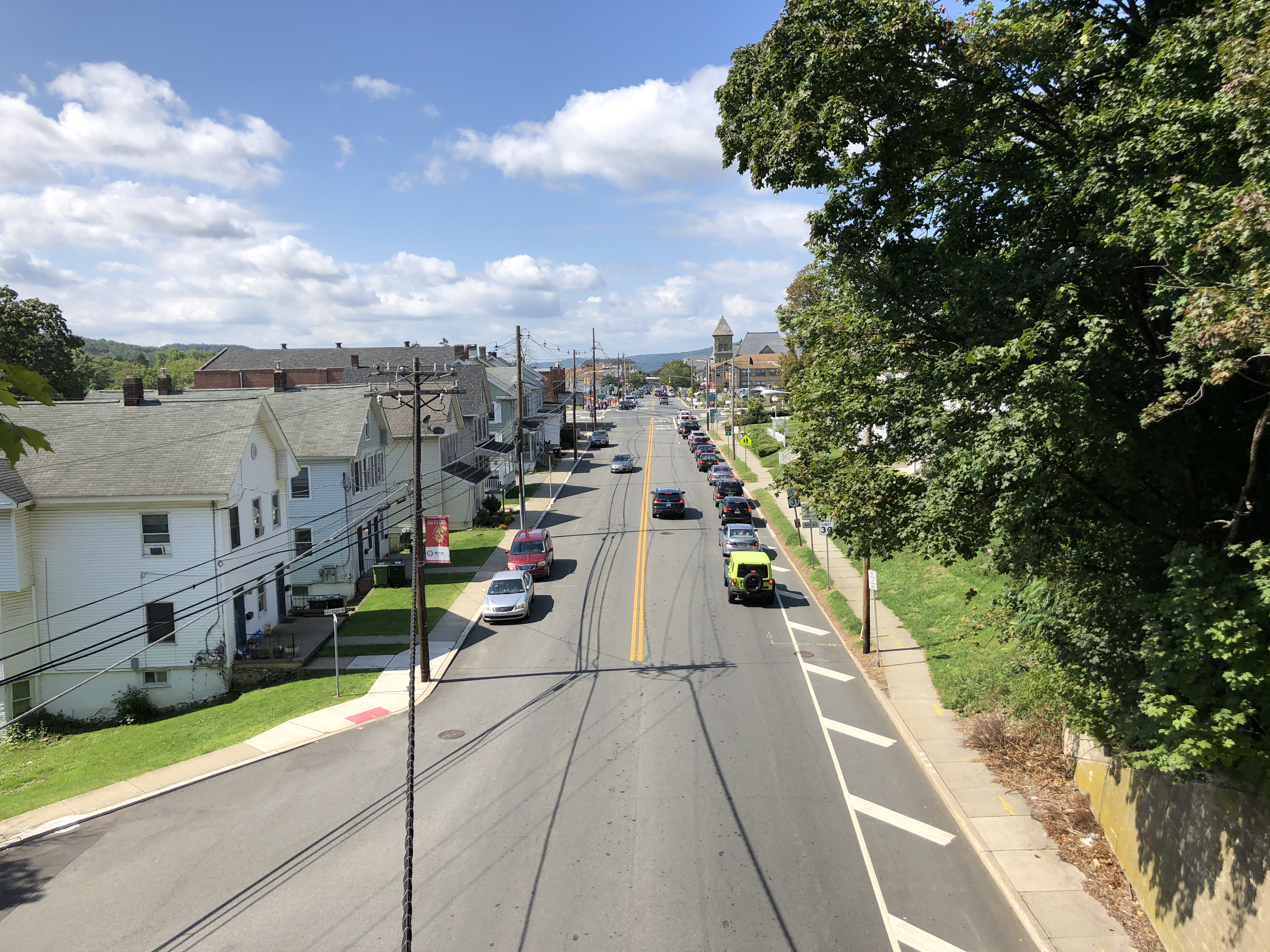
Route 57 westbound in Washington Borough

The portion of Route S24 between Penwell and County Route 517 in the southern part of Hackettstown (Route 57’s current eastern terminus) became part of mainline Route 24 in the 1953 New Jersey state highway renumbering in order to complete the gap that existed in that route between Penwell and Long Valley. The portion of Route S24 from this point north to U.S. Route 46 was designated as Route 57. In 1965, a portion of Route 57 was designated to bypass Hackettstown, running from its intersection with Route 24 to U.S. Route 46 east of Hackettstown; this was never built. Around 1970, Route 24 west of Hackettstown became part of Route 57 while the portion of Route 57 that had existed between Route 24 and U.S. Route 46 was designated Route 182.

In the 2000s, the New Jersey Department of Transportation worked with communities along Route 57 to create a land use and transportation plan for the area surrounding the route, as part of their Future In Transportation plan.

By Joint Resolution No. 5, approved August 13, 1997, the New Jersey Legislature designated Route 57 as the Admiral John D. Bulkeley Memorial Highway. Vice Admiral John D. Bulkeley, a decorated naval hero of World War II and the Korean War, grew up in Mansfield Township and was a graduate of Hackettstown High School.

== Major intersections ==
The entire route is in Warren County.

Location	mi	km	Destinations	Notes
Lopatcong Township	0.00	0.00	US 22 west – Phillipsburg	Western terminus
Lopatcong Township	1.52	2.45	CR 519 (Uniontown Road) – Belvidere, Alpha	
Washington	11.01	17.72	Route 31 – Delaware Water Gap, Clinton	
Hackettstown	21.10	33.96	Route 182 north / CR 517 to US 46 – Andover, Long Valley	Eastern terminus; southern terminus of Route 182
1.000 mi = 1.609 km; 1.000 km = 0.621 mi
