= New Jersey Route 182 =

State highway in Hackettstown, New Jersey, United States

Route 182

Route information
- Maintained by NJDOT
- Length: 0.96 mi (1,540 m)
- Existed: 1969–present

Major junctions
- South end: Route 57 / CR 517 in Hackettstown
- North end: US 46 / CR 517 in Hackettstown

Location
- Country: United States
- State: New Jersey
- Counties: Warren

Highway system
- New Jersey State Highway Routes; Interstate; US; State; Scenic Byways
| ← Route 181 | → Route 183 |

Route 182 is a 0.96-mile (1.54 km) state highway in Hackettstown, New Jersey, United States. The highway serves as a connector of Route 57 to U.S. Route 46 (US 46). The southern end of Route 182 is at a three-way intersection, where Route 57 heads westbound towards Phillipsburg. Also present at this intersection is County Route 517 (CR 517), which is signed as Route 24, but not maintained by the state. CR 517 runs concurrent with Route 182 to its north end at US 46, and turns west with US 46 before splitting in downtown Hackettstown.

Route 182 was first an alignment of pre-1927 Route 12, but was not maintained by the state. In 1927, there was a renumbering, and it became part of Route S-24, which was a spur of Route 24. Route 24 at the time went along the alignment of Route 57, but when the second renumbering occurred in 1953, there was yet another change. In 1953, Route 24 was realigned onto most of Route S24, except for a short part which was designated Route 57. The highway went through a final change on October 9, 1969. On that day, there was a small renumbering of Hackettstown, with Route 24 being truncated to the three-way intersection, and Route 57 reassigned onto the rest of Route 24. The former alignment of Route 57 was reassigned as Route 182.

== Route description ==
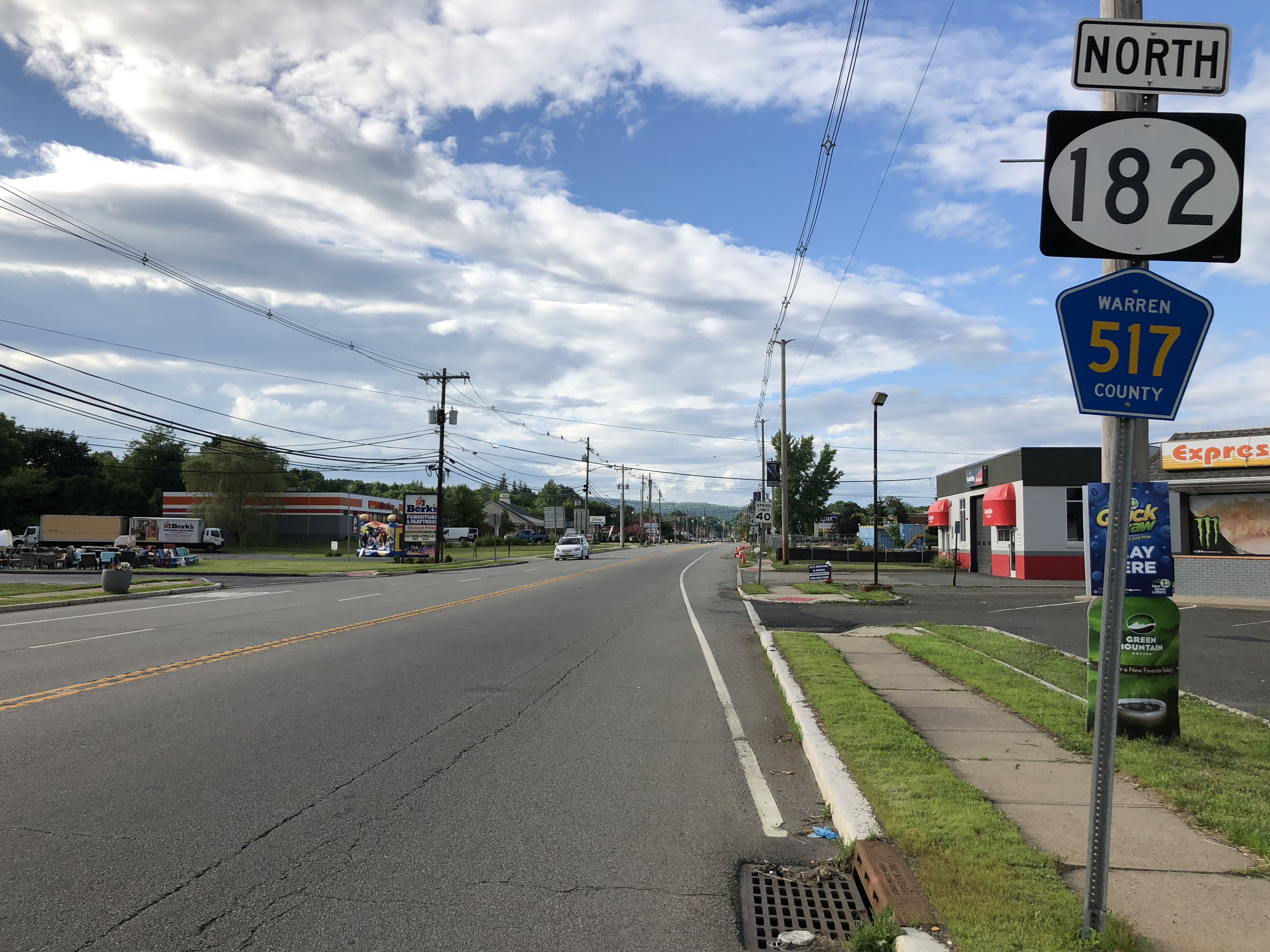
Route 182 heading northbound concurrent with CR 517 through Hackettstown

Route 182 begins at an intersection with Route 57 and County Route 517 (CR 517). Immediately at that intersection, CR 517 becomes concurrent with Route 182, but is maintained by the New Jersey Department of Transportation. The fourth road at that intersection is Riveredge–Mobile Home Court, which is a cul-de-sac. The highway progresses northward, passing some small commercial buildings and arriving at the largest free-standing shopping center in Hackettstown, across from Shelley Drive. The next significant intersection is with East Avenue and an adjacent stripmall. East Avenue heads east briefly turning northeast, crosses over the Musconetcong River, passes behind the Union Cemetery, and intersects US 46.

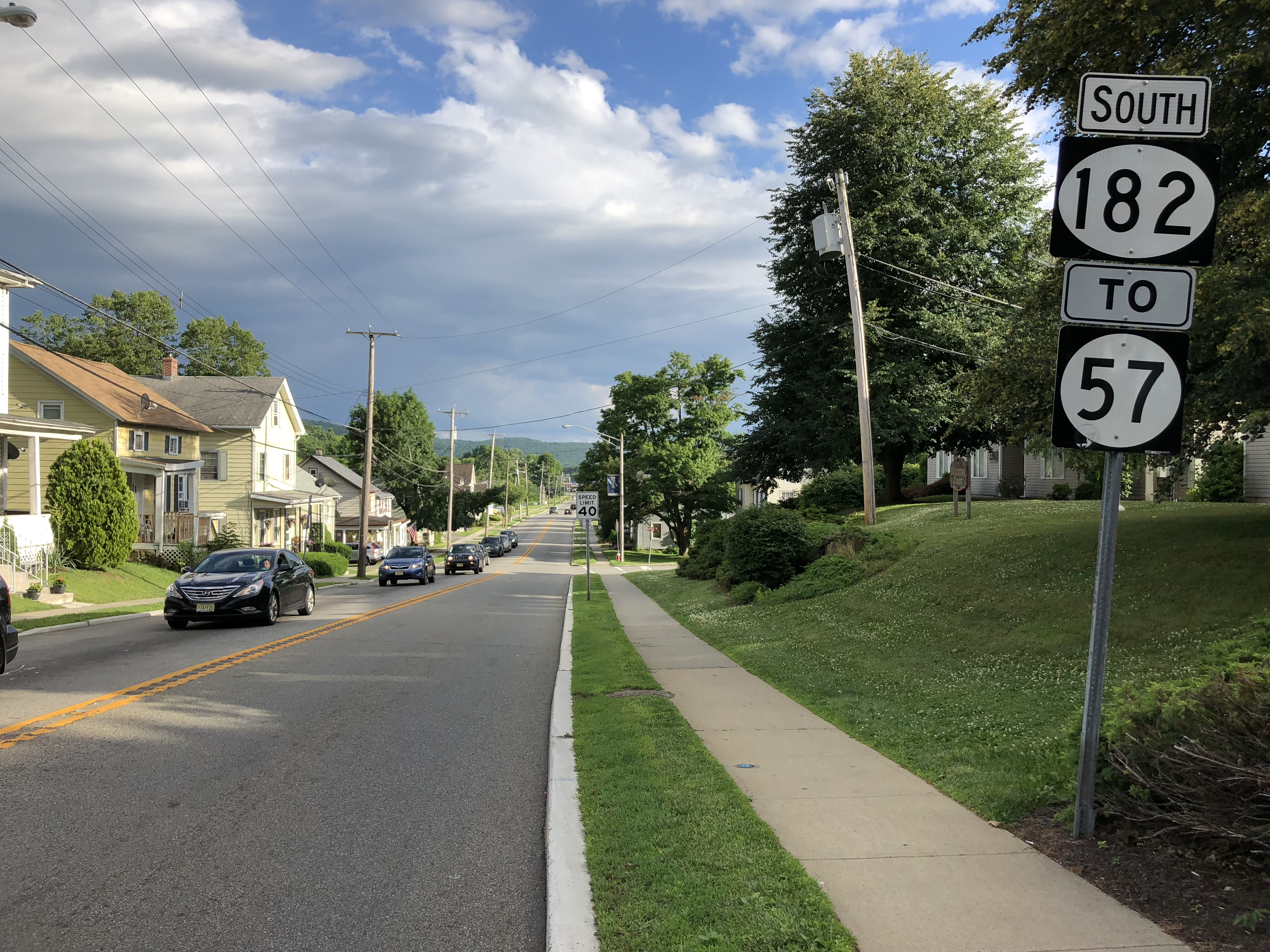
View south at the north end of Route 182 at US 46 in Hackettstown

Route 182 continues northward, passing several small businesses and side streets, as well as the main entrance to the Union Cemetery. Route 182 ends at a three-way intersection with US 46 and CR 604. CR 604 is also signed as Willow Grove Street, and heads northwest out of the intersection. US Route 46 is also signed as Mill Street, with the eastbound side heading east-southeast from the intersection and the westbound side heading northwest from the intersection. CR 517 which had been concurrent with Route 182, continues along a concurrency with U.S. Route 46 westbound.

== History ==
Route 182 was originally defined as a segment of a spur of the Washington Turnpike. The stretch of road was later signed as the head of the Lackawanna Trail, running from Hackettstown to Binghamton, NY. In 1916, the road was incorporated into pre-1927 Route 12. However, it was not maintained by the state, and instead, maintained by the county. The highway remained the same until 1927, which is when it became a part of Route S24, which was assigned as a spur off of Route 24. The parent highway, Route 24, was assigned as a highway to run from Schooley's Mountain west to Penwell. There, Route S24 would terminate, but the direct highway was not improved by the county. Instead of the original decision, Route 24 was assigned to end at Hackettstown, where the two highways would intersect at the southern end of Route 182.

The next change to the highway, was in 1953, when the New Jersey State Highway Department renumbered the highway system around the state. This time, Route 24 was defined to run along the alignment of the now-decommissioned Route S24. Now, Route 24 ran along a new alignment, including a part which was supposed to be temporary. The entirety of current Route 57 was also assigned as Route 24. That year, the state took over the alignment that was maintained by the county. The final change in highway alignment around Hackettstown occurred on October 9, 1969. This time Route 24 was truncated off the alignment of current Route 57, and now ended in Hackettstown, at the three-way intersection. The older alignment of Route 57 did not retain its designation, as plans developed to make a bypass of Hackettstown, continuing the highway from Phillipsburg to U.S. Route 46 just east of Hackettstown. However, plans never finished, and instead, the designation of Route 182 was assigned to the original alignment of Route 57.

== Major intersections ==
The entire route is in Hackettstown, Warren County.

| mi | km | Destinations | Notes |
|---|---|---|---|
| 0.00 | 0.00 | Route 57 west / CR 517 south – Washington, Phillipsburg, Long Valley | Southern terminus; southern end of CR 517 concurrency; eastern terminus of Route 57 |
| 0.96 | 1.54 | US 46 / CR 517 north (Main Street / Mill Street) – Delaware Water Gap, Netcong | Northern terminus; northern end of CR 517 concurrency |
1.000 mi = 1.609 km; 1.000 km = 0.621 mi: Concurrency terminus
