= List of county routes in Warren County, New Jersey =

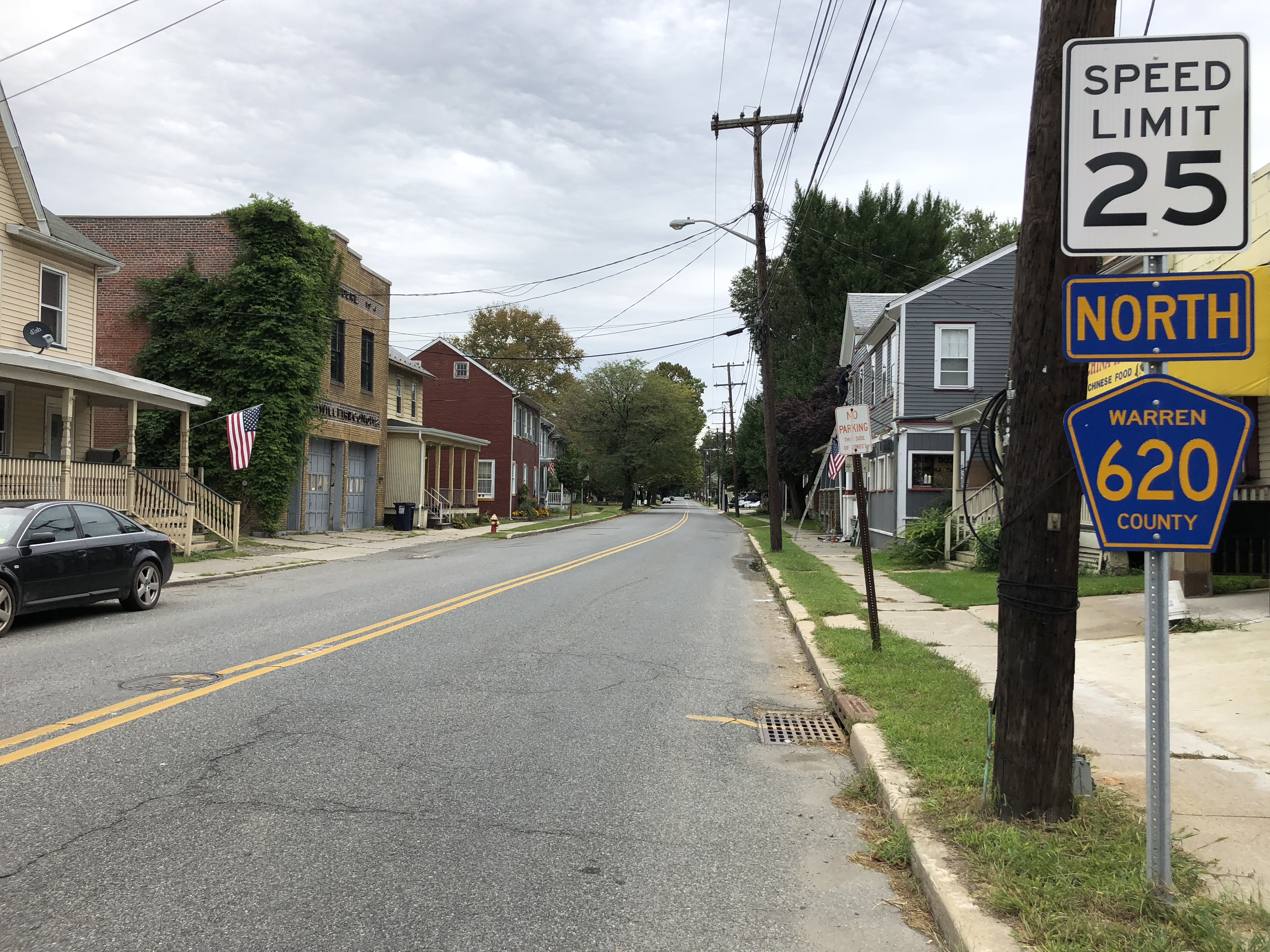
View north along CR 620 in Belvidere

The following is a list of county routes in Warren County in the U.S. state of New Jersey.

== 500-series county routes ==
In addition to those listed below, the following 500-series county routes serve Warren County:

- CR 517, CR 519, CR 521, CR 579

== Other county routes ==
Route	Length (mi)	Length (km)	From	Via	To	Notes
CR 601	0.63	1.01	Millbrook Road (CR 602) in Blairstown	High Street	Stillwater Road (CR 521) in Hardwick Township	
CR 602	5.99	9.64	Route 94 in Blairstown	Bridge Street, Millbrook Road	End of the county maintenance in Hardwick Township	Signage continues to Old Mine Road, with the northernmost portion concurrent with NPS Route 602
CR 604	5.46	8.79	Main Street (US 46) in Hackettstown	Willow Grove Street, Waterloo Road	Waterloo Road (CR 604) at the Sussex County line in Allamuchy	
CR 605	4.34	6.98	Knowlton Road (CR 616) in Knowlton Township	Valley Street, Delaware Road, Warrington Road	Route 94 in Knowlton Township	
CR 607	0.75	1.21	Hope Road (CR 521) in Blairstown	Edge Hill Road	Cedar Lake Road (CR 616) in Blairstown	
CR 608	4.99	8.03	Hope–Blairstown Road (CR 521) in Hope Township	Silver Lake–Marksboro Road, Silver Lake Road	Route 94 in Frelinghuysen Township	
CR 609	5.50	8.85	US 46 in Knowlton Township	Ramseyburg Road, Delaware Road, High Street	Hope–Bridgeville Road (CR 519), High Street (CR 519), and Hope–Blairstown Road (CR 521) in Hope Township	
CR 610	2.38	3.83	Hope Road (CR 519) in Hope Township	Swayze Mill Road	Delaware Road (CR 609) in Hope Township	
CR 611	4.77	7.68	US 46 in Independence Township	Hope Road, Great Meadows Road	High Street (CR 519) and Johnsonburg Road (CR 519) in Hope Township	
CR 611M	0.26	0.42	High Street (CR 519) and Johnsonburg Road (CR 519) in Hope Township	Millbrook Road	Hope–Blairstown Road (CR 521) in Hope Township	
CR 612	4.9	7.9	Old Hackettstown Road (CR 667) in Allamuchy	Johnsonburg Road, Allamuchy Road	Johnsonburg Road (CR 519) in Frelinghuysen Township	
CR 613	6.87	11.06	US 46 in Independence Township	Alphano Road	Johnsonburg Road (CR 612) in Allamuchy	
CR 614	3.85	6.20	US 46 in Independence Township	Water Street, Petersburg Road	US 46 in Independence Township	
CR 615	2.07	3.33	Alphano Road (CR 613) in Allamuchy	Long Bridge Road	Johnsonburg Road (CR 612) in Allamuchy	
CR 616	9.62	15.48	US 46 in Knowlton Township	Knowlton Road, Mt Hermon Road, Cedar Lake Road	Route 94/CR 521 in Blairstown	
CR 617	2.12	3.41	US 46 in White Township	Green Pond Road, Mountain Lake Road	Lakeside Drive South and Lakeside Drive West in Liberty Township	
CR 618	2.08	3.35	US 46 in White Township	Sarepta Road	Hope–Bridgeville Road (CR 519) in White Township	
CR 619	0.73	1.17	US 46 in White Township	Titman Road	US 46 in White Township	
CR 620	3.37	5.42	Phillipsburg–Belvidere Road (CR 519) in White Township	Belvidere Road, Greenwich Street, Market Street, Water Street	US 46 in White Township	
CR 620 Spur	0.34	0.55	Pennsylvania state line on the Riverton–Belvidere Bridge in Belvidere	Water Street	Water Street (CR 620) and Market Street (CR 620) in Belvidere	
CR 621	9.14	14.71	Memorial Parkway in Phillipsburg	North Main Street, River Road, Brainards Road	Belvidere Road (CR 519) in Harmony Township	
CR 621 Spur	0.18	0.29	River Road (CR 621) in Harmony Township	Broad Street	Railroad tracks in Harmony Township	
CR 622	3.03	4.88	Belvidere Road (CR 519) in Harmony Township	Hutchinson Station Road, River Road, Hutchinson River Road, Roxburg Station Road	Belvidere Road (CR 519) in Harmony Township	
CR 623	6.53	10.51	Route 57 in Washington Township	Brass Castle Road	Belvidere border in White Township	
CR 624	2.83	4.55	Brass Castle Road (CR 623) in White Township	Hazen Oxford Road, Belvidere Avenue, Wall Street	Route 31 in Oxford Township	
CR 625	7.35	11.83	Brass Castle Road (CR 623) in Washington Township	Jonestown Road, Academy Street, Axford Avenue, Pequest Road, Pequest–Furnace Road	US 46 in White Township	
CR 626	3.15	5.07	Belvidere Road (CR 519) in White Township	Lommason Glen Road, Summerfield Road	Brass Castle Road (CR 623) in White Township	
CR 627	4.11	6.61	Riegelsville–Milford Road (CR 627) at the Hunterdon County line in Pohatcong Township	Riegelsville–Warren Glen Road	Riegelsville–Warren Glen Road (CR 519) and Milford–Warren Glen Road (CR 519) in Pohatcong Township	
CR 628	6.48	10.43	Brass Castle Road (CR 623) in Washington Township	Kinnaman Avenue, Jackson Valley Road, Karrville Road	Rockport Road (CR 629) in Mansfield Township	
CR 629	6.66	10.72	Route 57 in Mansfield Township	Port Murray Road, Main Street, Rockport Road	Hackettstown border in Mansfield Township	
CR 630	1.50	2.41	Route 31 in Washington Township	Washburn Avenue	Route 57 in Washington Township	
CR 631	0.33	0.53	Academy Street (CR 625) in Oxford Township	Washington Avenue	Belvidere Avenue (CR 624) in Oxford Township	
CR 632	11.89	19.14	Route 173 in Greenwich Township	Bloomsbury Road, Old Main Street, Asbury–Anderson Road	Route 57 in Mansfield Township	
CR 633	1.00	1.61	End of the county maintenance in Franklin Township	Edison Road	Route 57 in Franklin Township	
CR 634	0.66	1.06	Asbury–Anderson Road (CR 632) in Washington Township	Franklin Road	Route 31 in Washington Township	
CR 635	2.32	3.73	River Road in Pohatcong Township	Snyders Road	Springtown Road (CR 519) in Pohatcong Township	
CR 636	1.37	2.20	Springtown Road (CR 519) in Pohatcong Township	Municipal Drive	Warren Glen Road (CR 639) in Pohatcong Township	
CR 637	5.07	8.16	Warren Glen Road (CR 639) in Greenwich Township	Maple Drive, South Main Street, North Main Street, Liberty Road	Uniontown Road (CR 519) in Lopatcong Township	
CR 638	2.44	3.93	US 22 in Greenwich Township	Greenwich Street, Washington Street	Richline Road in Greenwich Township	
CR 639	2.86	4.60	Springtown Road (CR 519) and Riegelsville–Warren Glen Road (CR 519) in Pohatcong Township	Warren Glen Road	Route 173 in Greenwich Township	
CR 640	1.04	1.67	Route 31 in Washington Township	South Lincoln Avenue	Cemetery Hill Road in Washington Township	
CR 641	0.63	1.01	Springtown Road (CR 519) and 3rd Avenue (CR 519) in Alpha	Springtown Road, Lee Avenue	High Street (CR 642) in Alpha	
CR 642	0.86	1.38	Creek Road in Pohatcong Township	High Street	3rd Avenue (CR 519) in Alpha	
CR 643	3.87	6.23	Asbury–West Portal Road (CR 643) at the Hunterdon County line in Franklin Township	Main Street, Asbury–Broadway Road	Route 57 in Franklin Township	
CR 644	0.47	0.76	Route 173 in Greenwich Township	Greenwich Church Road	Route 173 in Greenwich Township	
CR 645	1.94	3.12	Changewater Road at the Hunterdon County line in Washington Township	Changewater Road	Washburn Avenue (CR 630) in Washington Township	
CR 646	3.88	6.24	US 22 in Phillipsburg	Lincoln Road, Belvidere Road	Belvidere Road (CR 519) and Uniontown Road (CR 519) in Harmony Township	
CR 647	8.06	12.97	Belvidere Road (CR 519) in Harmony Township	Harmony–Brass Castle Road	Brass Castle Road (CR 623) in Washington Township	
CR 648	1.90	3.06	Route 57 in Washington Township	Little Philadelphia Road	Brass Castle Road (CR 623) in Washington Township	
CR 649	1.62	2.61	Kinnaman Avenue (CR 628) in Washington Township	Plane Hill Road, Bowerstown Road, Mine Hill Road	Kinnaman Avenue (CR 628) and Jackson Valley Road (CR 628) in Washington Township	
CR 650	1.57	2.53	Jackson Valley Road (CR 628) in Mansfield Township	Tunnel Hill Road	Route 31 on the Mansfield/Washington township line	
CR 651	1.28	2.06	Asbury–Anderson Road (CR 632) in Washington Township	McCullough Road	Route 57 in Washington Township	
CR 652	2.43	3.91	Route 57 in Mansfield Township	Watters Road, Thomas Road	Rockport Road (CR 629) in Mansfield Township	
CR 653	0.37	0.60	CR 517 in Allamuchy	Old Allamuchy Road	Bald Eagle Road in Allamuchy	
CR 654	0.31	0.50	High Street (CR 517) in Hackettstown	Old Allamuchy Road	CR 517 in Independence Township	
CR 655	6.22	10.01	Delaware Road (CR 609) in Hope Township	Mt Hermon Road, Vail Road	Route 94 in Blairstown	
CR 656	0.58	0.93	US 46 in Independence Township	Tannery Road	US 46 in Independence Township	
CR 657	0.63	1.01	Decatur Street in Knowlton Township	Simpson Road	Hainesburg River Road in Knowlton Township	
CR 658	3.8	6.12	Delaware Road (CR 605) and Warrington Road (CR 605) in Knowlton Township	Vail Road, Polkville Road	Mt Hermon Road (CR 655) in Blairstown	
CR 659	3.15	5.07	Millbrook Road (CR 602) in Hardwick Township	Spring Valley Road	Route 94 in Frelinghuysen Township	
CR 660	0.31	0.50	Route 94 in Blairstown	Main Street	Bridge Street (CR 602) in Blairstown	
CR 661	1.4	2.3	Johnsonburg Road (CR 519) in Frelinghuysen Township	Ramsey Road	Route 94 in Frelinghuysen Township	
CR 665	0.87	1.40	CR 517 in Independence Township	Bilby Road	Willow Grove Street (CR 604) in Hackettstown	
CR 667	0.36	0.58	CR 517 in Allamuchy	Old Hackettstown Road	CR 517 in Allamuchy	
CR 668	1.07	1.72	Johnsonburg Road (CR 612) in Allamuchy	Cemetery Road	Maple Lane at the Sussex County line in Allamuchy	
CR 669	1.24	2.00	Johnsonburg Road (CR 612) in Allamuchy	Ervey Road	Quaker Road at the Sussex County line in Allamuchy	
CR 671	0.62	1.00	Route 94 in Blairstown	Cleveland Road	Route 94 in Blairstown	
CR 672	0.33	0.53	Route 94 in Blairstown	Democracy Road	Route 94 in Blairstown	
CR 673	0.56	0.90	Route 94 in Blairstown	Eisenhower Road	Route 94 in Blairstown	
CR 674	0.85	1.37	Route 94 in Blairstown	Buchanan Road	Route 94 in Blairstown	
CR 675	0.24	0.39	Route 94 in Blairstown	Adams Road	Route 94 in Blairstown	
CR 676	0.20	0.32	Church Street in Knowlton Township	Columbia Street, Decatur Street, Green Street	Washington Street in Knowlton Township	
CR 677	0.25	0.40	Raymond Street in Phillipsburg	Morris Street	US 22 in Phillipsburg	
CR 678	0.92	1.48	South Main Street (Route 122) and Pursel Street in Phillipsburg	South Main Street	Sitgreaves Street and South Main Street in Phillipsburg	
CR 679	2.94	4.73	Lakeside Drive North in Liberty Township	Mountain Lake Road	Hope Road (CR 611) in Liberty Township	
CR 680	0.61	0.98	Mt Pisgah Avenue in Oxford Township	Mt Pisgah Avenue	Dead end in White Township	
CR 681	1.43	2.30	Johnsonburg Road (CR 519) in Frelinghuysen Township	Ackerson Road	Silver Lake Road (CR 608) in Frelinghuysen Township	
CR 682	0.6	0.97	Vail Road (CR 658) and Polkville Road (CR 658) in Blairstown	West Crisman Road	Route 94 in Blairstown	
CR 683	1.1	1.77	Petersburg Road (CR 614) in Independence Township	Ryan Road, Cat Swamp Road	Cat Swamp Road in Allamuchy	
