= County Route 519 (New Jersey) =

County highway in New Jersey, U.S.

County Route 519
- CR 519 highlighted in red

Route information
- Length: 88.54 mi (142.49 km)

Major junctions
- South end: Route 29 in Delaware Township
- Route 12 in Kingwood Township; Route 122 in Pohatcong Township; US 22 in Pohatcong Township; Route 57 in Lopatcong Township; US 46 in White Township; Route 94 in Newton; US 206 in Newton; US 206 in Branchville; Route 23 in Wantage Township
- North end: CR 55 at the New York state line

Location
- Country: United States
- State: New Jersey
- Counties: Hunterdon, Warren, Sussex

Highway system
- County routes in New Jersey; 500-series routes
← CR 518	→ CR 520

County Route 519 (CR 519) is a county highway in the U.S. state of New Jersey. The highway extends 88.54 miles (142.49 km) from Daniel Bray Highway (Route 29) in Delaware Township to the New York state line in Wantage Township. It is the state's longest county route.

== Route description ==
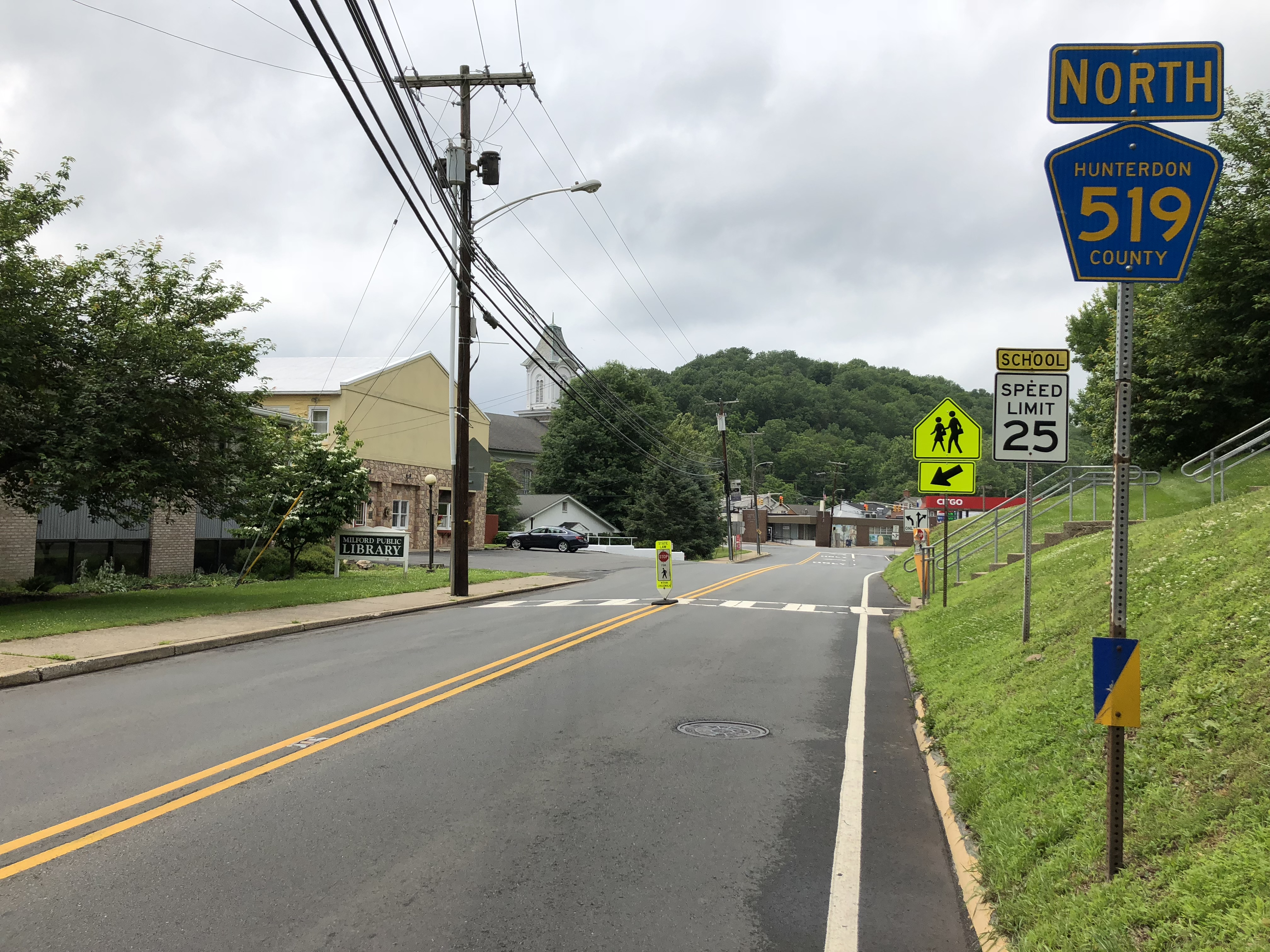
View north along CR 519 at Frenchtown Road (CR 619) in Milford

CR 519 begins at an intersection with Route 29 in Delaware Township, Hunterdon County, just north of the municipality line with Stockton. It heads north on two-lane, undivided Kingwood-Stockton Road. The road first passes through woods before entering farm fields. The route passes through the residential community of Rosemont before continuing back into agricultural areas. CR 519 enters Kingwood Township and continues through a mix of farmland and woodland, becoming Kingwood Road at the CR 651 intersection. In Kingwood Township, the route comes to a junction with Route 12 in the community of Baptistown, where the road is lined with homes. CR 519 passes through more rural areas with a few housing developments as it continues into Alexandria Township.

Here, the route turns northwest onto Palmyra Road at an intersection with Senator Stout Road/Hog Hollow Road and soon crosses CR 513. CR 519 forms the border between Holland Township to the west and Alexandria Township to the east as turns southwest onto Mount Pleasant Road, with CR 631 continuing north. At this point, the route is fully within Holland Township and continues through agricultural areas before entering Milford. The road makes a turn to the south before heading southwest again and passes residences. At the intersection with CR 619, CR 519 turns northwest onto Frenchtown Road and becomes Water Street at the intersection with Bridge Street/Barron Road a short distance later in the commercial center of Milford. The road passes more homes before leaving Milford for Holland Township again and becoming Milford-Warren Glen Road. In this area, the route passes a mix of farms, woods, and residential subdivisions, turning north and running through the community of Riegel Ridge. Past here, CR 519 enters woodland and turns northwest before crossing over Musconetcong Mountain.

After crossing the Musconetcong River, CR 519 enters Pohatcong Township, Warren County and immediately turns north at the CR 627 intersection into wooded areas with some farms and homes. The route winds to the northwest and passes under I-78. After this, CR 519 becomes Springtown Road and briefly forms the border between Alpha to the west and Pohatcong Township to the east before completely entering Alpha and continuing north. The road becomes Third Avenue and passes a few businesses before crossing under Norfolk Southern's Lehigh Line and passing several homes with some commercial establishments. After crossing back into Pohatcong Township and becoming Hawk Avenue, CR 519 intersects Route 122 and turns northwest to form a concurrency with that route on New Brunswick Avenue. CR 519 splits from Route 122 by turning northeast onto Saint James Avenue and passing more homes. The road passes near commercial development as it comes to a junction with US 22. Past US 22, the route becomes Uniontown Road and enters Greenwich Township. It passes near a mix of farm fields and residential neighborhoods as it makes a curve to the north and crosses into Lopatcong Township. CR 519 briefly becomes a divided highway as it passes under Norfolk Southern's Washington Secondary before crossing Route 57.

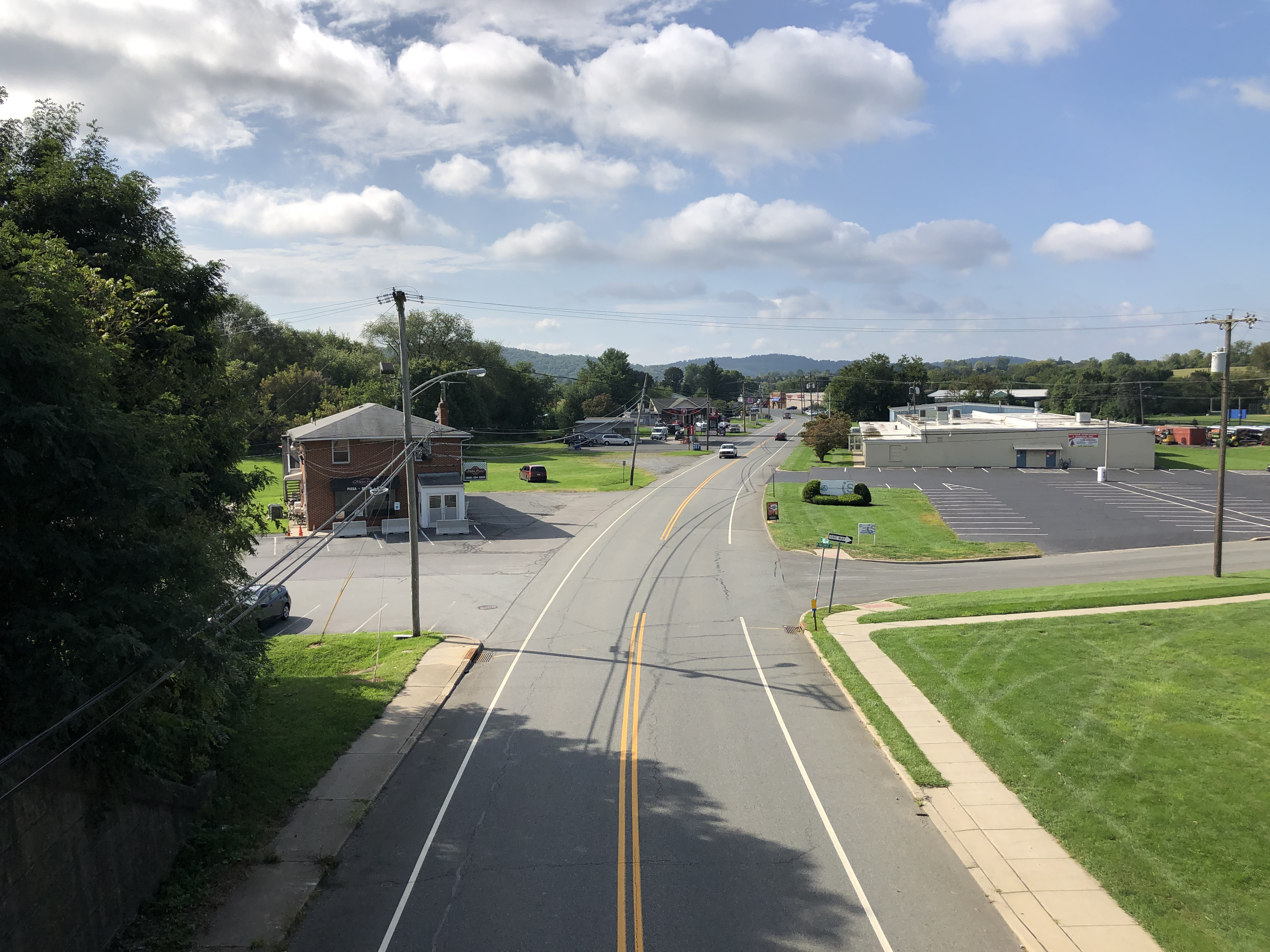
CR 519 southbound in Alpha

Past this intersection, the route enters more rural areas of farms and woods with a few homes and businesses as it continues into Harmony Township. The road turns northeast onto Upper Belvidere Road as it runs through agricultural areas with the Delaware River a short distance to the west and Scotts Mountain to the east. CR 519 continues into White Township, where it reaches an intersection with CR 620. At this intersection, CR 620 continues north on Belvidere Road toward Belvidere while CR 519 heads northeast onto Hazen-Bridgeville Road. It passes through more rural areas as it continues to a junction with US 46, where the route passes a few residences.

From this point, CR 519 becomes Bridgeville-Hope Road and passes through more farm areas immediately to the west of Jenny Jump State Forest, turning more to the northeast and entering Hope Township. The road passes a mix of woods and farms as it curves north and enters the residential community of Hope. Here, CR 519 becomes Union Street and makes a turn east onto High Street, with CR 521 continuing north at this point. CR 519 continues northeast out of Hope along Hope-Johnsonburg Road, passing through a mix of farmland and woodland with occasional homes. The road crosses under I-80 before coming into Frelinghuysen Township and becoming Johnsonburg Road. In this area, the surroundings become more wooded with a few fields. The road passes near a few wooded residential areas before coming to the CR 661 junction, at which point CR 519 turns northeast onto Johnsonburg-Newton Road. The route heads through more rural areas and crosses under the abandoned Lackawanna Cutoff.

CR 519 crosses into Green Township, Sussex County and becomes Hibler Road. A short distance past the county line, the route turns north onto Wintermute Road, which makes a turn northeast into a narrow agricultural valley. Upon intersecting CR 608, CR 519 enters Fredon Township and the name changes to Ridge Road. The road continues into a mix of woodland and residential areas, with some farm fields, before entering Newton. At this point, the route becomes West End Avenue and passes several homes. CR 519 comes to an intersection with Route 94, and turns east to follow that route along High Street. Route 94 and CR 519 continue to downtown Newton and come to the Park Place square, where the road meets US 206. At this point, all three routes run concurrent north on four-lane undivided Water Street for a short distance. CR 519 splits from US 206/Route 94 by turning northwest onto four-lane undivided Mill Street. The road soon narrows to two lanes as it passes businesses and makes a turn to the north, passing by Sussex County Community College.

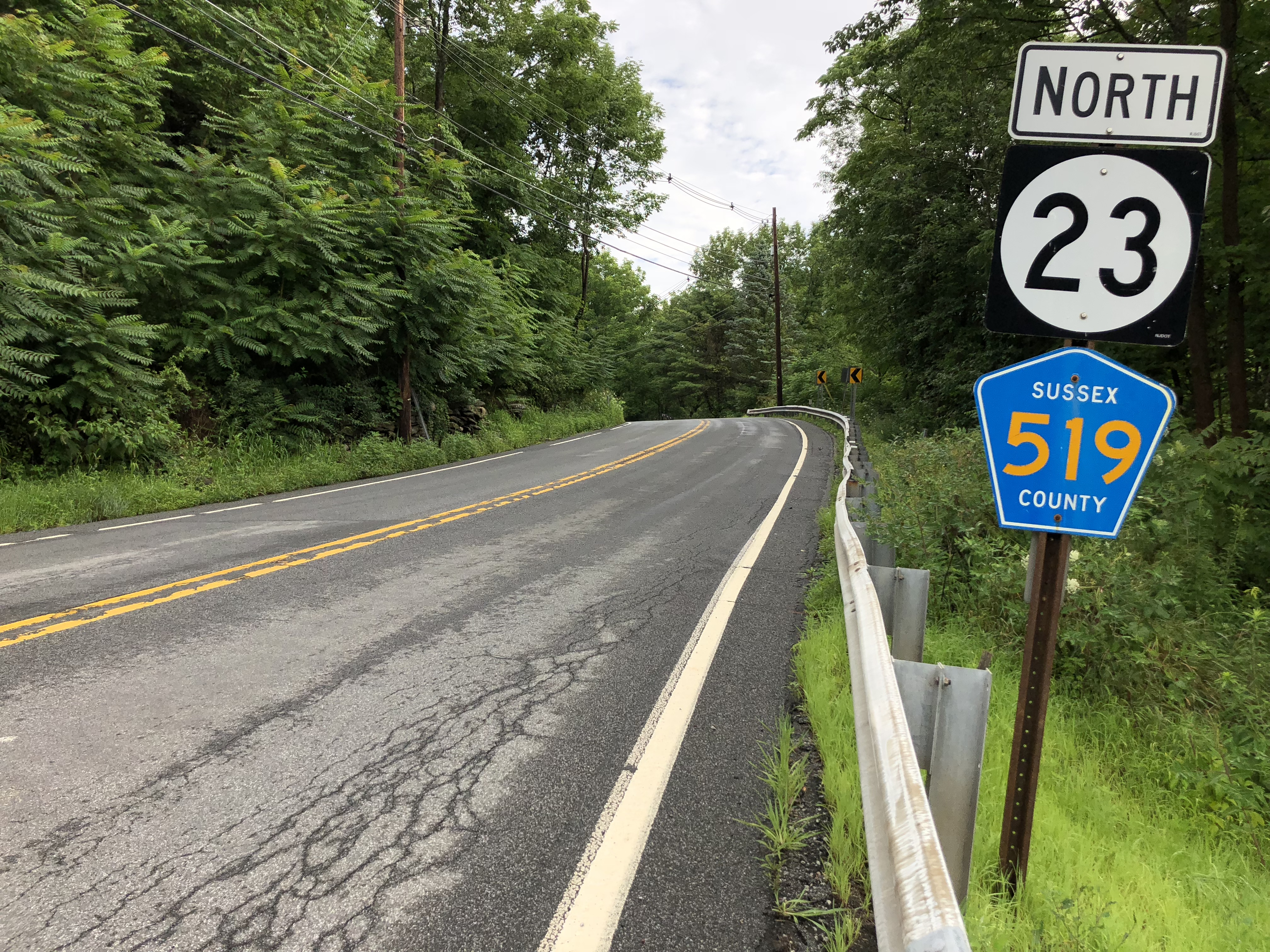
CR 519 northbound along its concurrency with Route 23 in Wantage Township

The route crosses into Hampton Township and becomes Conrads Corner Road as it passes rural areas of residences, heading northeast. CR 519 curves north and crosses the Paulinskill Valley Trail before it enters woodland and turns northeast again. The road enters farmland and makes a sharp turn west-northwest to cross the Paulins Kill. A short distance later, the route turns north onto Branchville-Lawson Road and enters Frankford Township. CR 519 passes through forested areas with some homes prior to entering Branchville and becoming Newton Avenue. The route crosses US 206 before making a turn west onto Mill Street. The road passes a mix of residences and businesses as it reaches the center of Branchville, where CR 519 turns northeast onto Wantage Avenue. The road passes more homes before crossing back into Frankford Township, at which point it passes through a forest. The route makes a turn north onto Branchville-Lewisburg Road, with Wantage Avenue continuing to the northeast as CR 629. CR 519 passes some homes before entering a mix of woods and farms, curving northeast again.

Upon crossing into Wantage Township, the road makes a turn to the east and passes a mix of homes and businesses as well as the Space Farms Zoo and Museum. CR 519 heads northeast into more farmland as it comes to a turn north onto Colesville-Lusscroft Road. The route runs through more rural areas with some residential development, eventually making a bend to the northeast. CR 519 continues to an intersection with Route 23, where it turns north for a concurrency with that route. The two routes pass through forested areas with some homes until CR 519 splits from Route 23 by heading north on Greenville Road. This road carries the route north, entering dense forests and crossing the Appalachian Trail before it comes to the New York border. At the state line, CR 519 ends and the road continues into Orange County, New York as CR 55.

== History ==
From Mill Street, starting about 250 feet northwest of its current intersection (following realignment in the 1970s from Spring Street) with Water Street at Trinity Street in Newton, to the currently-named Morris Turnpike in Hampton Township, CR 519 follows the route of the former Morris (and Sussex) Turnpike.

In Warren County, CR 519 used to follow County Route 620 and County Route 618 to directly serve Belvidere.

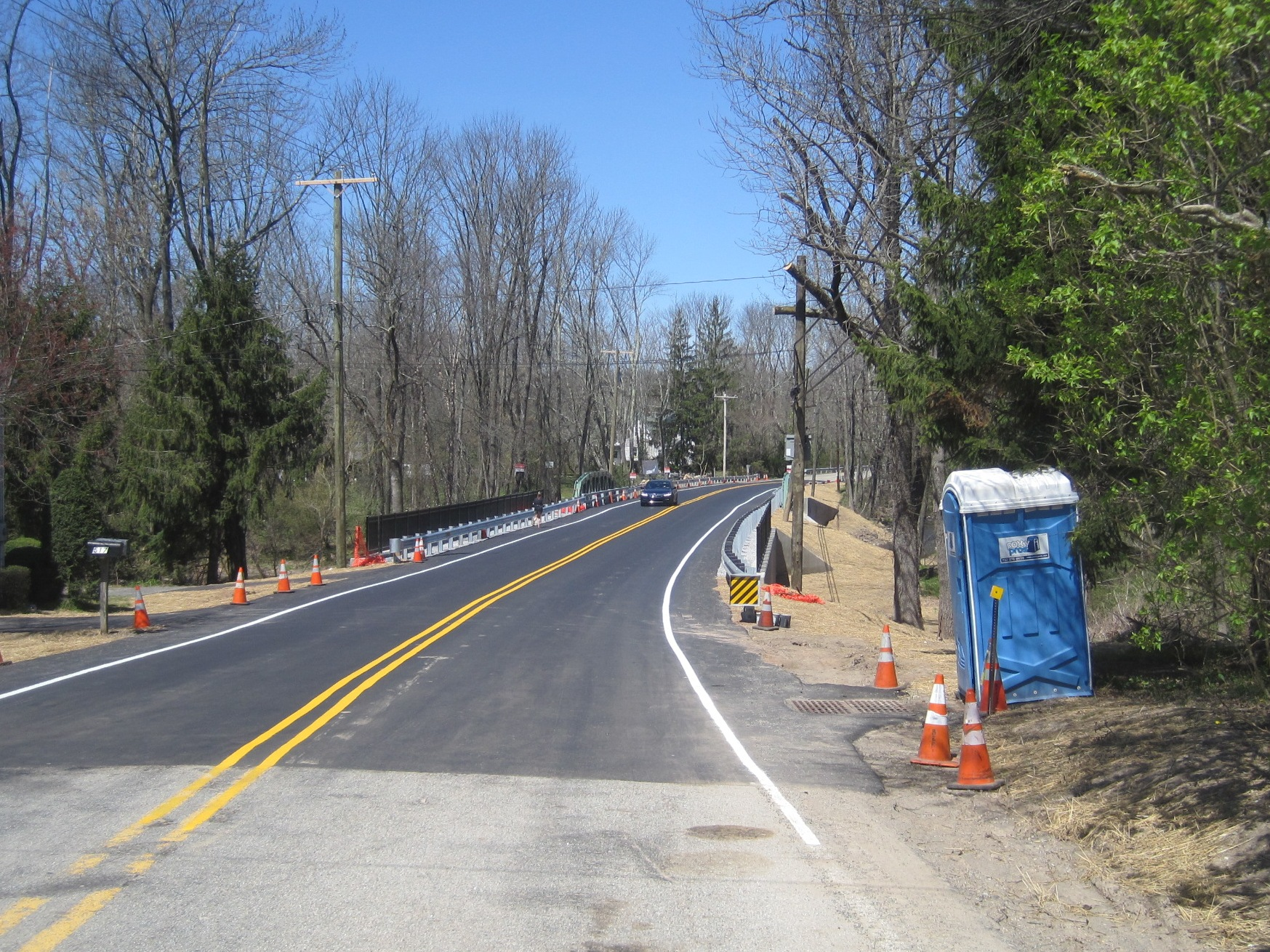
Concrete culvert and pony truss bridge carrying CR 519 over the Lockatong Creek in April 2016

A spur route, County Route 519 Spur, existed which is now Hunterdon County Route 651.

On June 12, 2014, a truck weighing over 40 short tons (36,000 kg) attempted to cross over a 114-year-old iron pony truss bridge crossing the Lockatong Creek in Kingwood Township causing the bridge to buckle. Hunterdon County, which is responsible for maintaining the bridge, closed the bridge to await replacement. A new truss bridge and concrete culvert opened on April 1, 2016.

== Major intersections ==
County	Location	mi	km	Destinations	Notes
Hunterdon	Delaware Township	0.00	0.00	Route 29 – Lambertville, Raven Rock, Frenchtown	Southern terminus
Hunterdon	Kingwood Township	8.81	14.18	Route 12 – Frenchtown, Flemington	
Hunterdon	Alexandria Township	12.60	20.28	CR 513 (Everittstown Road)	
Warren	Pohatcong Township	27.38	44.06	Route 122 east (New Brunswick Avenue) – Still Valley	Southern end of Route 122 concurrency
Warren	Pohatcong Township	27.59	44.40	Route 122 west (South Main Street) – Phillipsburg	Northern end of Route 122 concurrency
Warren	Pohatcong Township	28.33	45.59	US 22 – Easton, Clinton	
Warren	Lopatcong Township	29.93	48.17	Route 57 – Phillipsburg, Washington	
Warren	White Township	42.05	67.67	US 46 – Delaware Water Gap, Hackettstown, New York	
Warren	Hope Township	48.41	77.91	CR 521 north (Hope Blairstown Road) to I-80	Southern terminus of CR 521
Sussex	Newton	64.42	103.67	Route 94 south (High Street)	Southern end of Route 94 concurrency
Sussex	Newton	64.73	104.17	US 206 south (Main Street) – Netcong, Chester, Somerville	Southern end of US 206 concurrency
Sussex	Newton	64.94	104.51	US 206 north / Route 94 north	Northern end of US 206/Route 94 concurrency
Sussex	Branchville	71.45	114.99	US 206 – Milford, Newton	
Sussex	Wantage Township	83.70	134.70	Route 23 south – Sussex	Southern end of Route 23 concurrency
Sussex	Wantage Township	85.91	138.26	Route 23 north – High Point, Port Jervis	Northern end of Route 23 concurrency
Sussex	Wantage Township	88.54	142.49	CR 55 north (Mountain Road)	Continuation into New York
1.000 mi = 1.609 km; 1.000 km = 0.621 mi: Concurrency terminus
