= U.S. Route 22 in New Jersey =

Highway in New Jersey

U.S. Route 22
- US 22 highlighted in red

Route information
- Maintained by NJDOT and DRJTBC
- Length: 60.53 mi (97.41 km)
- Existed: 1926–present

Major junctions
- West end: US 22 at the Pennsylvania state line in Phillipsburg
- I-78 / Route 122 / Route 173 in Greenwich Township; Route 31 in Clinton Township; US 202 / US 206 in Bridgewater Township; I-287 in Bridgewater Township; G.S. Parkway / Route 82 in Union Township
- East end: I-78 / US 1-9 / Route 21 in Newark

Location
- Country: United States
- State: New Jersey
- Counties: Warren, Hunterdon, Somerset, Union, Essex

Highway system
- United States Numbered Highway System; List; Special; Divided; New Jersey State Highway Routes; Interstate; US; State; Scenic Byways
← Route 21	→ Route 22

U.S. Route 22 (US 22) is a United States Numbered Highway stretching from Cincinnati, Ohio, in the west to Newark, New Jersey, in the east. In New Jersey, the route runs for 60.53 miles (97.41 km) from the Easton–Phillipsburg Toll Bridge over the Delaware River in Phillipsburg, Warren County, to Interstate 78 (I-78), US 1/9, and Route 21 at the Newark Airport Interchange in Newark, Essex County. The road first heads through the Phillipsburg–Alpha area as an arterial road before running concurrent with I-78 through mountainous and agricultural sections of western New Jersey between Alpha and east of Clinton in Hunterdon County. For the remainder of the route, US 22 runs to the south of I-78 through mostly suburban areas as a four- to six-lane arterial road, passing through Hunterdon, Somerset, Union, and Essex counties. Along this portion, it intersects US 202 and US 206 in Somerville, I-287 in Bridgewater Township, and the Garden State Parkway in Union.

What became US 22 in 1926 was first designated as Route 9, a route running from Phillipsburg to Elizabeth, in 1916. In 1927, Route 9 west of Elizabeth became Route 28 while the portion within Elizabeth became Route 27-28 Link. By 1941, US 22 was moved to its current alignment in the Phillipsburg area, following Route 24 and Route 24-28 Link; Route 28 in Phillipsburg became US 22 Alternate (US 22 Alt.; now Route 122). Also, US 22 was moved off Route 28 east of Bridgewater Township to follow Route 28-29 Link and Route 29 to Newark. In 1953, the long concurrencies with the state highways were removed. In the 1960s, I-78 was constructed close to the US 22 corridor throughout New Jersey. US 22 was moved onto the new Interstate between Alpha and Clinton in 1969 with most of the old route becoming Route 173.

== Route description ==
=== Phillipsburg to Annandale ===
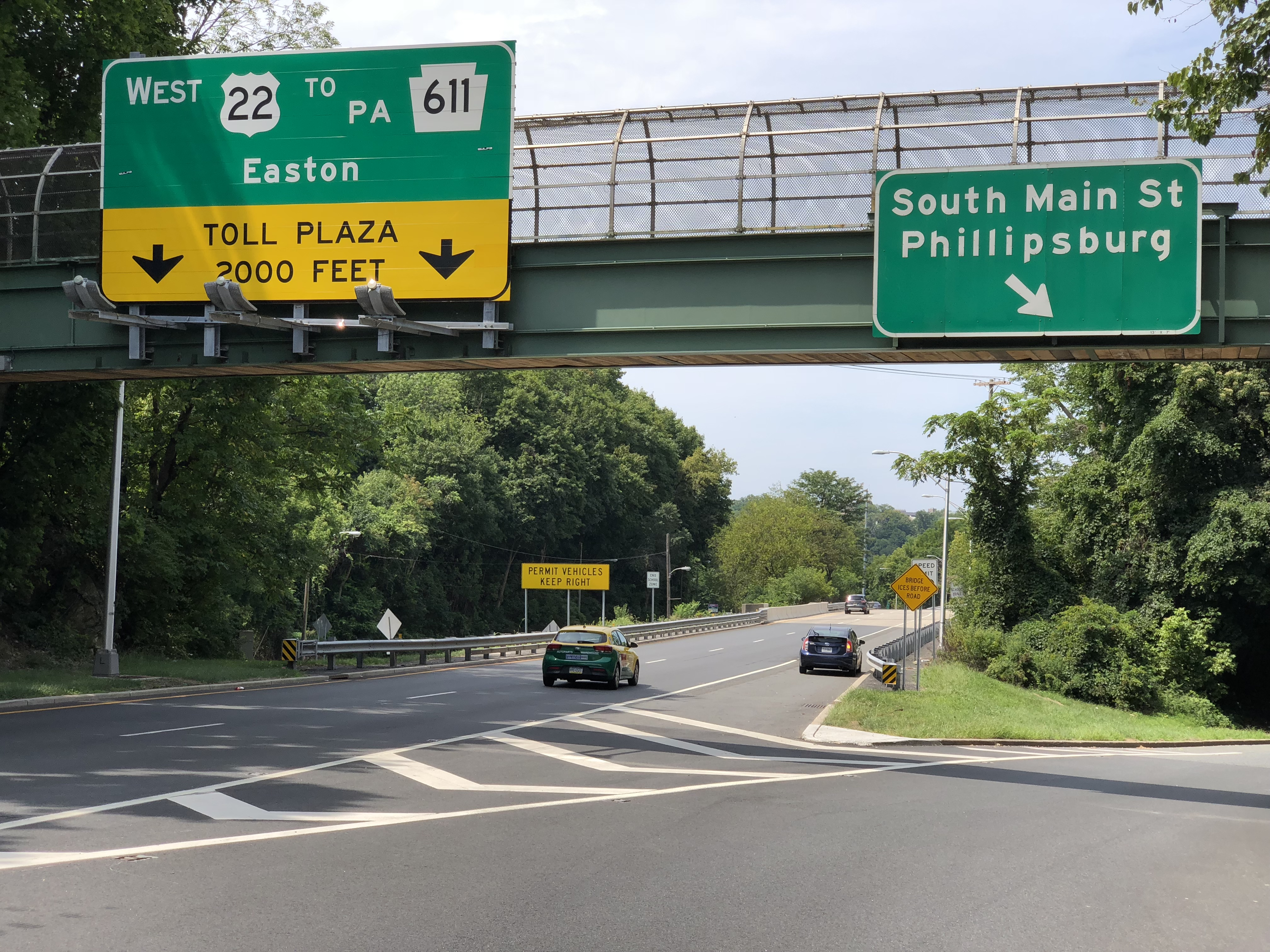
US 22 westbound at Main Street in Phillipsburg

US 22 enters New Jersey from Easton, Pennsylvania, on the Easton–Phillipsburg Toll Bridge over the Delaware River and Norfolk Southern Railway's Portland Secondary line. It heads into Phillipsburg, Warren County, as a four-lane undivided freeway maintained by the Delaware River Joint Toll Bridge Commission (DRJTBC). East of the bridge, the westbound lanes pass through the bridge toll plaza, and the route has an eastbound exit and westbound entrance for Broad and Main streets. From the previous exit, US 22 runs eastward as a four-lane divided freeway maintained by the New Jersey Department of Transportation (NJDOT) that ends in an interchange with Morris Street and Hillcrest Boulevard. At this point, the route becomes at-grade Memorial Boulevard; a commercial four to six-lane arterial road with a wide median consisting of U-turn ramps and jughandles. The median narrows as the road forms the border between Lopatcong Township to the north and Phillipsburg to the south. The route fully enters Lopatcong Township and comes to an interchange with Route 57, with an eastbound exit and a westbound entrance. After passing the Route 57 junction, US 22 takes a southeasterly turn and passes over the Washington Secondary line that is owned by Norfolk Southern Railway and operated by the Dover and Delaware River Railroad before entering an agricultural area. The route forms the border between Pohatcong Township to the west and Greenwich Township to the east as it passes to the east of former Phillipsburg Mall. A short distance later, US 22 intersects County Route 519 (CR 519) before heading back into a business district and meeting CR 638. East of Alpha, the route intersects Route 122, which is the final junction of the at-grade section of US 22.

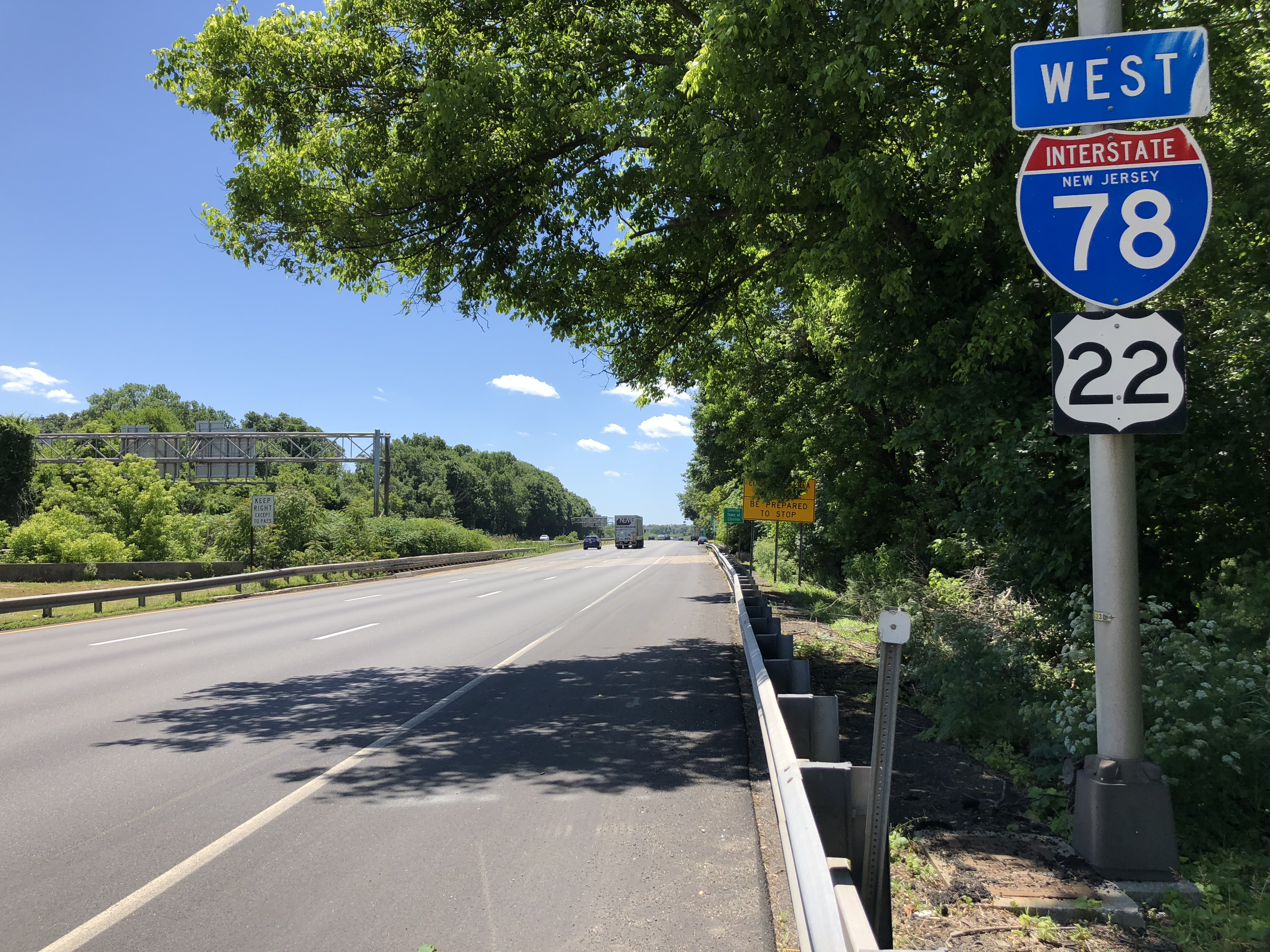
I-78/US 22 westbound past Route 31 interchange in Clinton

Past the Route 122 intersection, US 22 has an interchange with exit 3 of I-78 and the western endpoint of Route 173. From there, US 22 is concurrent with I-78 through a mountainous and rural area of western New Jersey. I-78/US 22 follow a six-lane freeway east through Greenwich Township, coming to a westbound exit and eastbound entrance with CR 637. The road turns southeast and has an eastbound exit and westbound entrance with CR 632 in Franklin Township. Within the ramps for this interchange, there are weigh stations in both directions. A short distance after this interchange, I-78/US 22 crosses the Musconetcong River into Bloomsbury, Hunterdon County. In Bloomsbury, the road has an interchange with Route 173. After this interchange, the freeway enters Bethlehem Township, with Route 173 closely running to the north of I-78/US 22. The road comes to a bridge over Norfolk Southern Railway's Central Running Track line and has rest areas in both directions before it passes over Norfolk Southern Railway's Lehigh Line and turns southeast to cross Musconetcong Mountain.

The freeway turns east again and enters Union Township, coming to an interchange with CR 614 and Route 173. From here, I-78/US 22 continue east directly to the south of Route 173, coming to another interchange with that route as well as CR 625. Entering more commercial areas, Route 173 merges onto I-78/US 22 at exit 13. At exit 15, the highway meets an interchange with CR 513, and Route 173 splits from I-78/US 22 by heading north on CR 513. At this point, the freeway runs along the border of Franklin Township to the south and Clinton to the north before entirely entering Clinton and crossing the South Branch Raritan River. I-78/US 22 turns northeast and leaves Clinton for Clinton Township, where it has an eastbound exit and westbound entrance for Route 173 that also provides access to Route 31. Immediately after is the interchange with Route 31. At the next interchange near the community of Annandale, US 22 splits from I-78, heading closely to the south of that route.

=== Annandale to Somerville ===
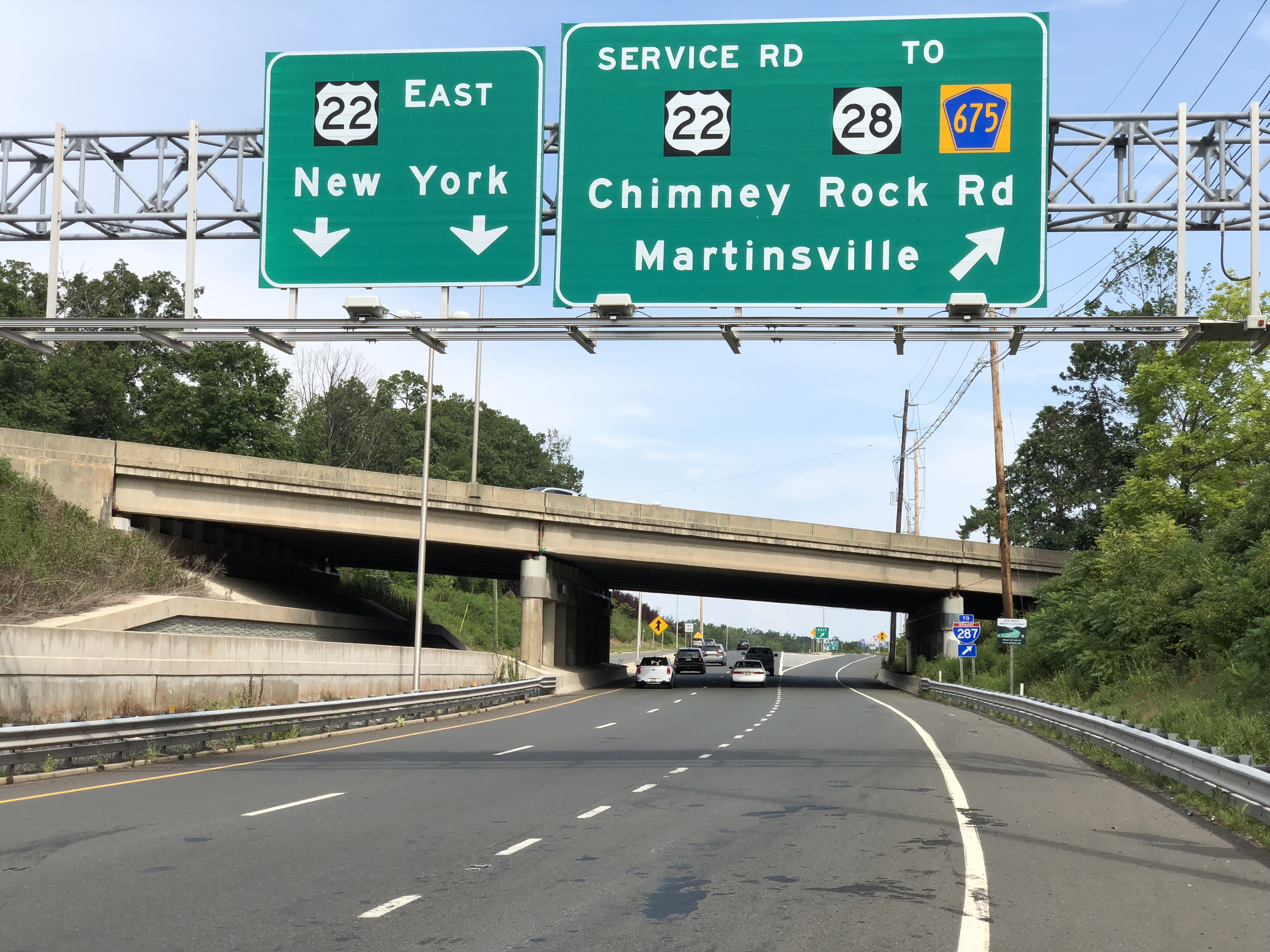
US 22 eastbound in Bridgewater Township

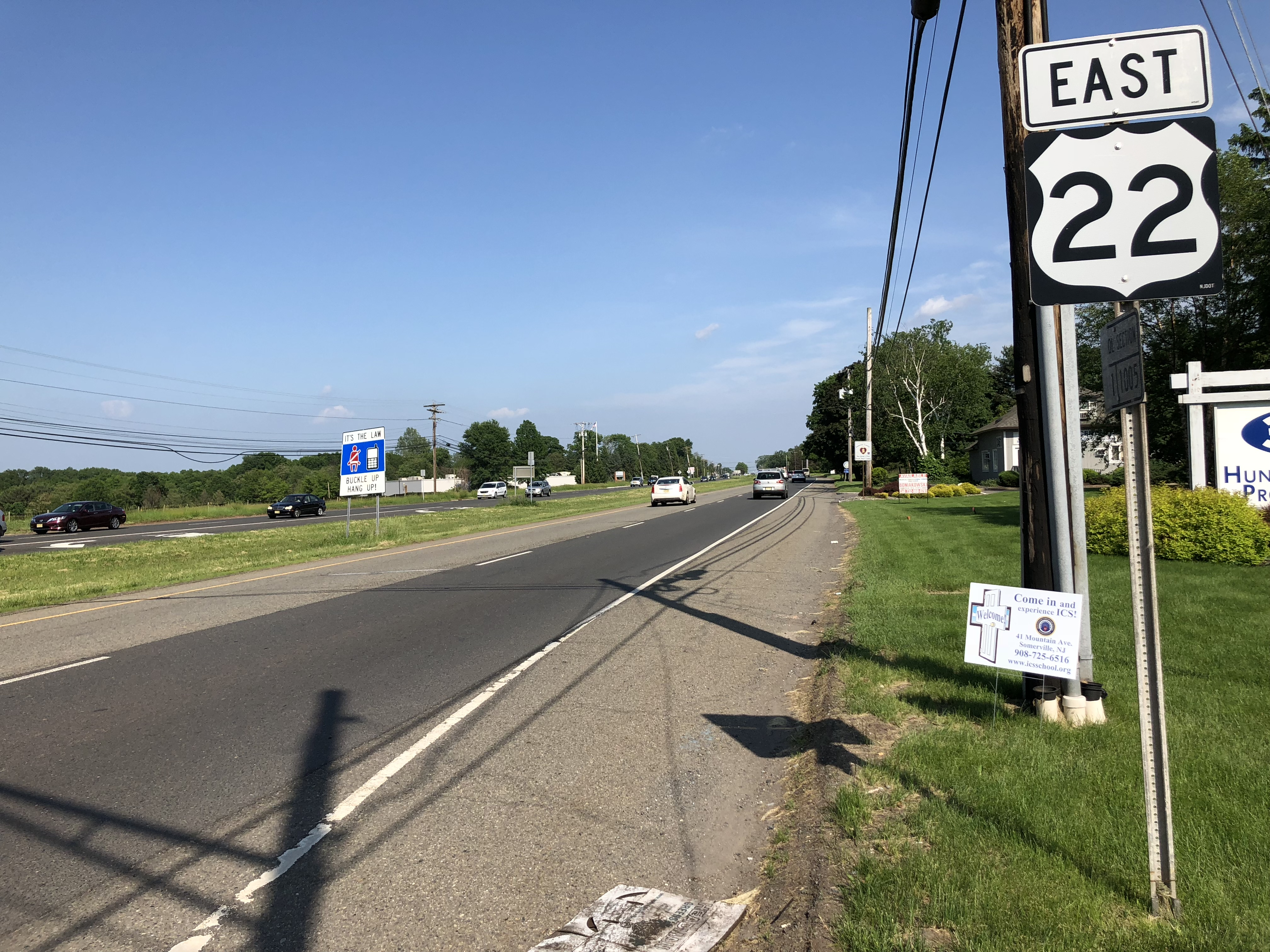
View east along US 22 in Branchburg Township

Upon splitting from I-78, US 22 becomes a four-lane arterial road that runs through rural areas with some development and crosses NJ Transit's Raritan Valley Line. It enters Lebanon, passing to the north of the town center. Upon leaving Lebanon, the route heads back into Clinton Township. In the community of Potterstown, US 22 enters Readington Township and takes a southeasterly turn away from I-78. Here, the road passes to the southwest of the Merck Headquarters Building before reaching the community of Whitehouse Station, where it has a short concurrency with CR 523. Past Whitehouse Station, US 22 continues through a mix of residential and commercial areas.

US 22 continues into Branchburg, Somerset County, where development near the road increases but remains mostly rural. CR 614 parallels US 22 to the north to pass through the community of North Branch before US 22 intersects CR 637 and crosses the North Branch Raritan River into Bridgewater Township. In Bridgewater Township, the route comes to an interchange with the eastern terminus of CR 614 and the western terminus of Route 28. Past this interchange, US 22 passes business parks and the Raritan Valley Country Club, widening to six lanes in the process. Afterward, it comes to an interchange with US 202 and US 206. Past this interchange, US 22 quickly transitions from a rural to a more suburban setting and heads east along the border of Somerville to the south and Bridgewater Township to the north, passing south of the Bridgewater Commons shopping mall. The median of the route widens as it runs immediately to the south of I-287, fully entering Bridgewater Township again as it comes to an interchange with I-287 at exits 14A and 14B.

=== I-287 to Newark Airport Interchange ===
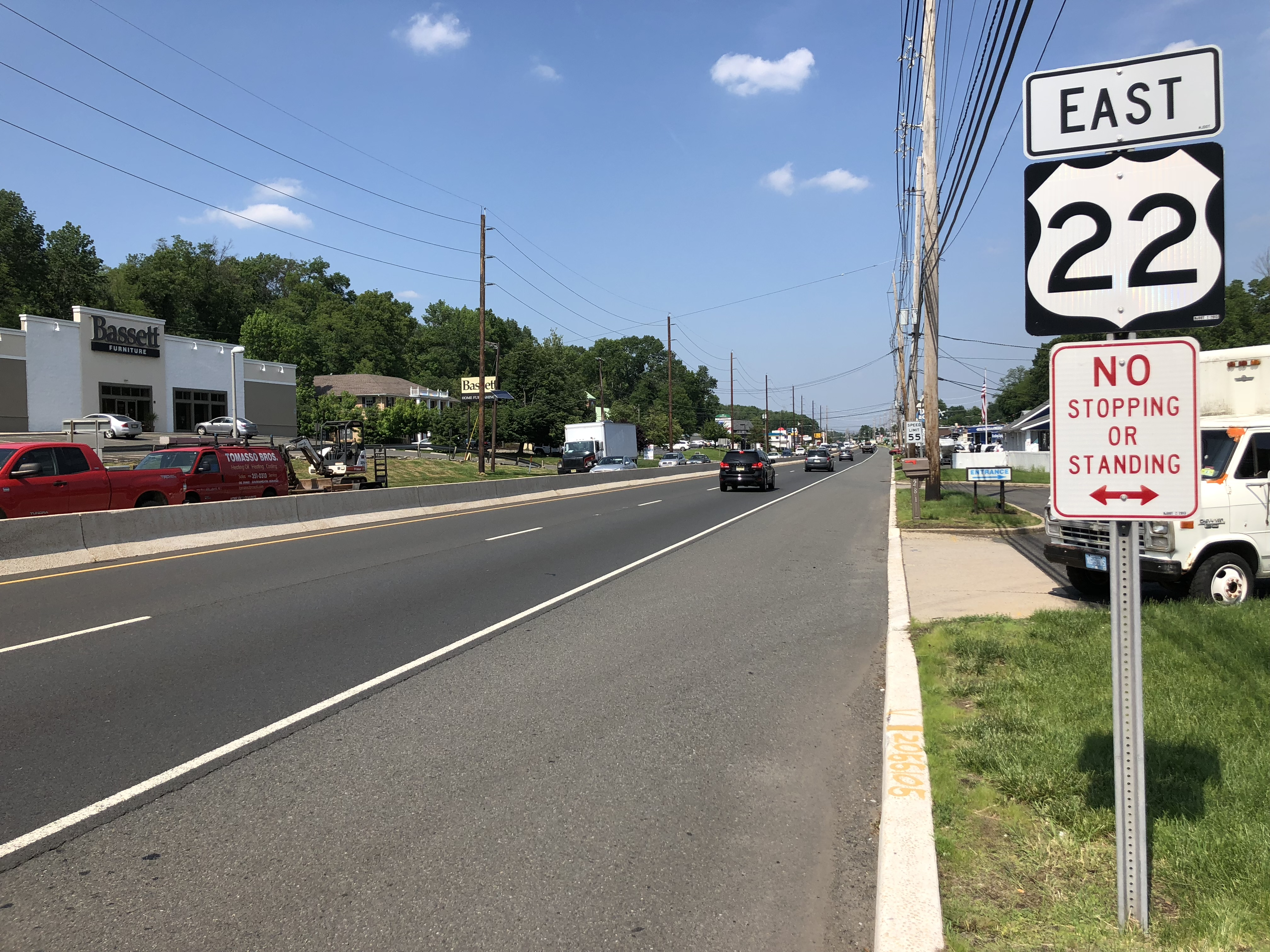
View east along US 22 at Cramer Avenue in Green Brook

East of I-287, US 22 continues east as a four-lane arterial road passing to the south of the Watchung Mountains. The road comes to an interchange with CR 675, where it also passes under Norfolk Southern Railway's Middle Brook Industrial Track line. The route then has an interchange with CR 525, where the wide grassy median narrows to a Jersey barrier. The road continues through wooded surroundings and passes through a portion of Bound Brook, widening back to six lanes before meeting CR 527 at an interchange. From here, the route takes a northeasterly course, entering Bridgewater Township again and narrowing to four lanes before crossing into Green Brook Township while designated a short distance north of the Middlesex–Somerset county border. US 22 continues through business areas as an arterial with jughandles, crossing CR 529. In North Plainfield, the route widens to six lanes and has an interchange with CR 531. Past this interchange, the road continues along the border of Watchung to the west and North Plainfield to the southeast before crossing Green Brook.

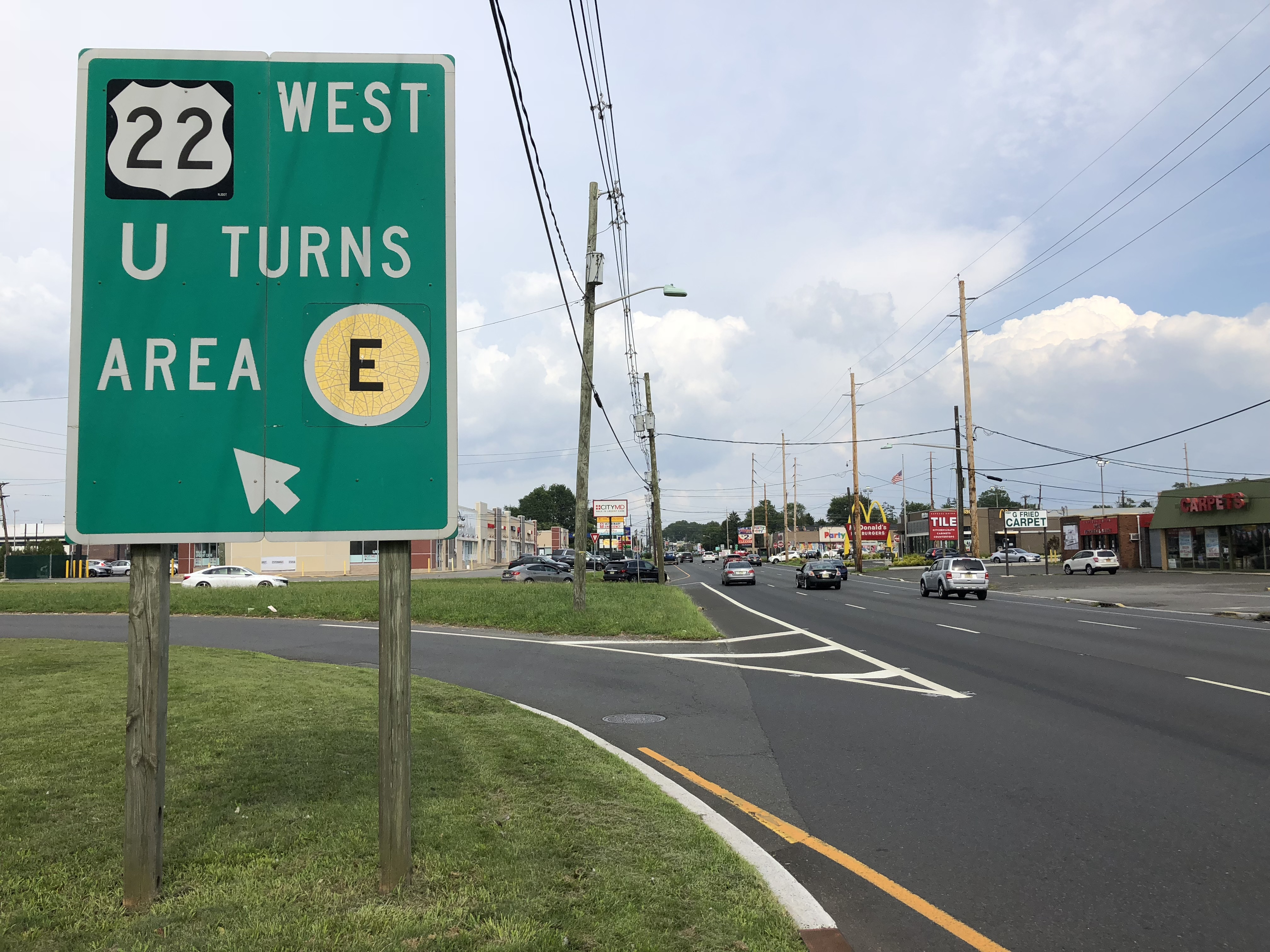
US 22 eastbound at a U-turn ramp in Union

At this crossing, US 22 heads north-northeast into Scotch Plains, Union County, coming to an interchange with CR 655. The route continues northeast as a four- to five-lane arterial road, passing near former Bowcraft Amusement Park. The road continues east through Mountainside, turning northeast before entering Springfield Township, where it has an interchange with CR 577. Past this interchange, for 1.8 miles (2.9 km), US 22 has a wide median that contains commercial businesses and numerous U-turn ramps. In this area, the road comes to a level crossing with the abandoned Rahway Valley Railroad. It crosses the Rahway River into Union Township, where the wide median continues. The route briefly forms the northern border of Kenilworth before the median narrows back into a Jersey barrier. US 22 splits into two carriageways at the intersection with exits 140 and 140A of the Garden State Parkway and Route 82, site of the Union Watersphere.

Past this interchange, the route comes to an exit for CR 630 before crossing the Elizabeth River into Hillside, where it heads east through more urban areas. The road has an interchange at Bloy Street before passing over CR 509 and Conrail Shared Assets Operations (CSAO)'s Irvington Industrial Track line. After an interchange with Broad Street, US 22 turns northeast as a four-lane freeway. It heads into Newark in Essex County, where the highway crosses under CSAO's Lehigh Line, which also carries NJ Transit's Raritan Valley Line, and passes through wooded Weequahic Park parallel to the railroad tracks. Past the park, US 22 turns to the east into urban areas and closely runs to the south of I-78, where it comes to an eastbound exit and westbound entrance for Empire Street, which provides access to Route 27. A short distance later, the freeway has a direct westbound exit and eastbound entrance with Route 27. Past this interchange, US 22 continues parallel to I-78, passing over Amtrak's Northeast Corridor before reaching the Newark Airport Interchange; south of Downtown Newark and northwest of Newark Liberty International Airport. US 22 eastbound merges with US 1/9, with one southbound ramp and two northbound ramps (one for local and another for express lanes). The main line follows the US 1/9 local northbound ramp for another 0.4 miles (0.64 km), with an intermediate exit for Route 21. The official eastern terminus of US 22 is at the ramp split for I-78 and northbound US 1/9.

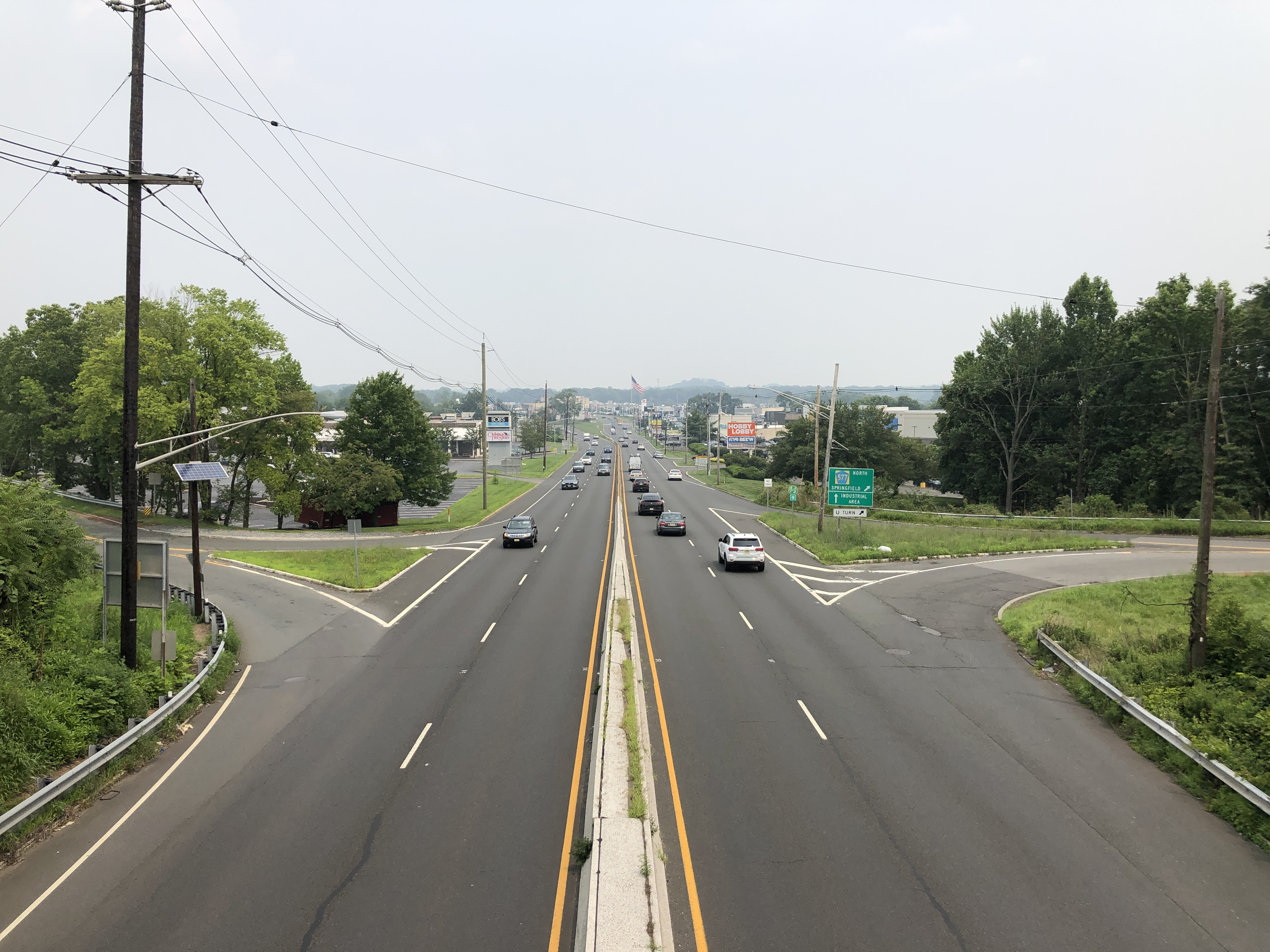
US 22 eastbound at CR 577 interchange in Springfield Township

== History ==
The portion of US 22 between Phillipsburg and Somerville roughly follows the alignment of the Jersey Turnpike, which was chartered in 1806 to run from New Brunswick to Philipsburg. This was originally built on a branch of the Great Minisink Trail that ran from what is now Metuchen to Lopatcong village in what is now Phillipsburg. The portion of the modern route that now enters Philipsburg was originally part of the Washington Turnpike, before being incorporated into the William Penn Auto Trail by 1916.

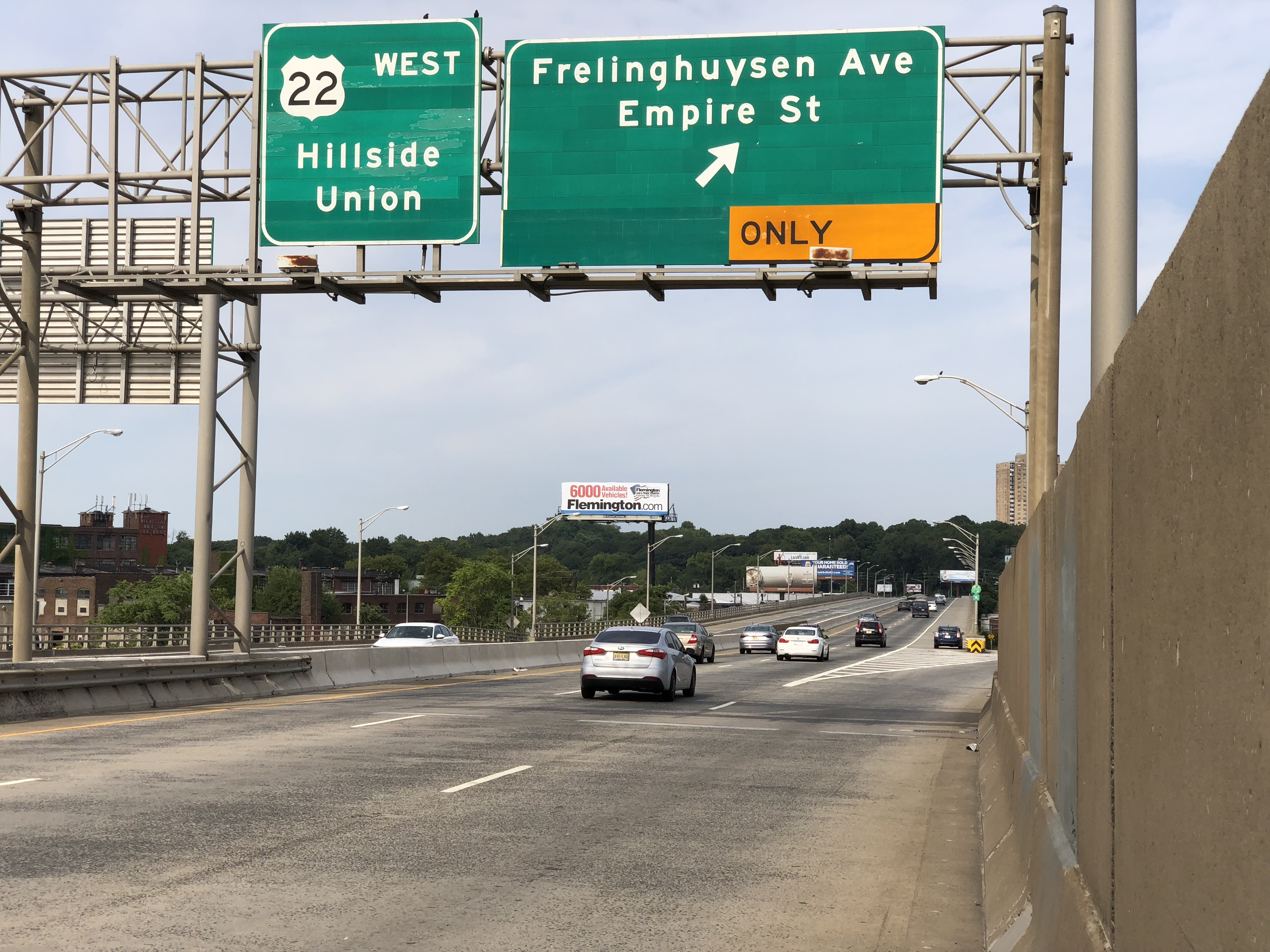
US 22 westbound at Route 27 in Newark

What became US 22 across New Jersey was originally designated as Route 9 in 1916, a route that ran from Phillipsburg east to Elizabeth. When the U.S. Numbered Highway System was established in 1926, US 22 was designated through New Jersey from the Northampton Street Bridge in Phillpsburg and followed Route 9 east to US 1/9 in Elizabeth. A year later, in the 1927 New Jersey state highway renumbering, Route 9 was replaced by Route 28, which itself was rerouted to continue to the Goethals Bridge. As a result, the alignment of US 22 in Elizabeth was designated Route 27-28 Link. By 1941, US 22 underwent two significant realignments within the state. In Phillipsburg, the route was moved from Route 28 to follow its current alignment on what was Route 24 between the Easton–Phillipsburg Toll Bridge and present-day Route 57 (then a part of Route 24) and Route 24-28 Link between there and Route 28. The approach to the Easton–Phillipsburg Toll Bridge, which opened in 1938, had been planned to be designated Route 24N, but instead became a part of Route 24. With the realignment of US 22 in Phillipsburg, the old alignment was designated as US 22 Alt. (now Route 122). In addition, US 22 was moved off from Route 28 east of Bridgewater Township to follow Route 28-29 Link and Route 29 to Newark; Route 29 had been legislated in the 1927 renumbering while Route 28-29 Link was legislated in 1938.

In the 1953 New Jersey state highway renumbering, the state highways running concurrent with US 22 were removed. With the planning of the Interstate Highway System in the 1950s, an Interstate Highway connecting the Harrisburg, Pennsylvania, area to New York City was planned to run roughly along the US 22 corridor in New Jersey. This Interstate was designated as I-78 in the final plans in 1958. The new Interstate roughly followed the alignment of the unconstructed Route 11, which had been legislated in 1927 to run from US 22 between White House and Warrenville. Between the Alpha area and Annandale, I-78 was to directly follow US 22; the portion between exits 11 and 13 involved the creation of new eastbound lanes for I-78 and conversion of the eastbound lanes of US 22 into the westbound lanes of I-78. The westbound lanes of US 22 were turned into a two-lane frontage road. This construction took place during the 1960s. US 22 was moved to the I-78 alignment between these two points in 1969. The former alignment between Alpha and Clinton became Route 173 while the portion east of there became county-maintained Beaver Avenue (currently designated CR 626). Originally, I-78 had been planned to use the Easton–Phillipsburg Toll Bridge across the Delaware River and follow US 22 through Phillipsburg and along the Lehigh Valley Thruway west through the Lehigh Valley of Pennsylvania. However, opposition within Phillipsburg led to the cancelation of this routing, and I-78 was rerouted to head to the south of the Lehigh Valley. In addition to the construction of I-78 along the US 22 corridor, US 22 itself evolved into a multilane divided highway from a two-lane road.

== Major intersections ==
County	Location	mi	km	Exit	Destinations	Notes
Delaware River		0.00	0.00		US 22 west to PA 611 – Easton	Continuation into Pennsylvania
Delaware River		0.00	0.00	Easton–Phillipsburg Toll Bridge (westbound toll; E-ZPass or toll-by-plate)		
Warren	Phillipsburg	0.27– 0.64	0.43– 1.03		Main Street / Broad Street – Phillipsburg	Signed for Broad Street eastbound, Philipsburg westbound; last westbound exit before toll
Warren	Phillipsburg			Eastern end of freeway section		
Warren	Lopatcong Township	2.07	3.33		Route 57 east – Washington	Eastbound exit and westbound entrance; western terminus of Route 57; interchange
Warren	Pohatcong Township	3.66	5.89		CR 519 (Belvidere Road / St. James Avenue) – Harmony Township, New Jersey, Belvidere, Alpha	
Warren	Pohatcong Township	4.36	7.02		Route 122 west (New Brunswick Avenue) – Alpha	Eastern terminus of Route 122
Warren	Greenwich Township	4.69	7.55	Western end of freeway section		
Warren	Greenwich Township	4.69	7.55	3	I-78 west / Route 173 east – Pennsylvania, Bloomsbury	Western end of I-78 concurrency; western terminus of Route 173
Warren	Greenwich Township	6.39	10.28	4	Warren Glen, Stewartsville	Westbound exit and eastbound entrance; access via CR 637
Warren	Franklin Township	7.94	12.78	6	Warren Glen, Asbury, Weigh Station	Eastbound exit and westbound entrance; access via CR 632
Hunterdon	Bloomsbury	8.37	13.47	7	Route 173 – West Portal, Bloomsbury	
Hunterdon	Union Township	12.67	20.39	11	Route 173 / CR 614 south – West Portal, Pattenburg	CR 614 not signed
Hunterdon	Union Township	14.33	23.06	12	Route 173 / CR 625 south / CR 635 north – Jutland, Norton	CR 625/CR 635 not signed
Hunterdon	Union Township	15.92– 15.98	25.62– 25.72	13	Route 173 west (Service Road)	Western end of Route 173 concurrency; westbound exit and eastbound entrance; former routing of US 22
Hunterdon	Franklin Township	16.97	27.31	15	Route 173 east (CR 513) – Clinton, Pittstown	Eastern end of Route 173 concurrency
Hunterdon	Clinton Township	18.23– 18.78	29.34– 30.22	17	Route 31 – Clinton, Washington, Flemington, Trenton	Signed as exits 16 (north) and 17 (south) eastbound
Hunterdon	Clinton Township	19.25	30.98	18	I-78 east – New York City	Eastern end of I-78 concurrency; eastbound exit and westbound entrance
Hunterdon	Clinton Township	19.25	30.98	Eastern end of freeway section		
Hunterdon	Readington Township	25.61	41.22		CR 523 north (Oldwick Road) – Oldwick, Bedminster	Western end of CR 523 concurrency
Hunterdon	Readington Township	25.80	41.52		CR 523 south (Main Street) – Whitehouse Station, Flemington	Eastern end of CR 523 concurrency
Somerset	Branchburg Township	30.87	49.68		North Branch Station (CR 679)	Interchange
Somerset	Bridgewater Township	31.59	50.84		Route 28 east – Somerville, Raritan, North Branch	Interchange; western terminus of Route 28
Somerset	Bridgewater Township	33.88	54.52		US 202 / US 206 to I-287 north – Morristown, Netcong, Flemington, Princeton	Interchange
Somerset	Bridgewater Township	34.07	54.83		Mountain Avenue (CR 643 south) – Somerville	Eastbound exit and entrance; interchange
Somerset	Bridgewater Township	34.37	55.31		Commons Way	No eastbound exit; interchange
Somerset	Bridgewater Township	34.72	55.88		North Bridge Street (CR 639) / Grove Street – Somerville, Bridgewater	Westbound exit and entrance; interchange
Somerset	Bridgewater Township	36.30	58.42		Finderne Avenue (CR 633) / Foot Hill Road – Manville	Westbound exit and entrance; interchange
Somerset	Bridgewater Township	36.68– 36.82	59.03– 59.26		I-287 to I-78 / I-95 Toll / N.J. Turnpike – Morristown, Mahwah, Perth Amboy	No eastbound access to I-287 north; exits 14A-B on I-287
Somerset	Bridgewater Township	37.2	59.9		CR 675 (Chimney Rock Road) to Route 28	Interchange
Somerset	Bridgewater Township	37.57	60.46		CR 525 (Thompson Avenue) – Bound Brook, Martinsville	Interchange
Somerset	Bound Brook–Bridgewater Township line	39.01	62.78		CR 527 (Mountain Avenue) – Bound Brook, VA Hospital	Interchange
Somerset	Green Brook Township	42.16	67.85		CR 529 (Washington Avenue)	
Somerset	North Plainfield	44.73	71.99		Somerset Street (CR 631) – The Plainfields	Interchange
Somerset	North Plainfield	44.87	72.21		CR 531 (Watchung Avenue) – Watchung, VA Hospital	Interchange
Union	Scotch Plains	47.41	76.30		CR 655 (New Providence Road) – Scotch Plains, Fanwood, Berkeley Heights, New Providence	Interchange
Union	Mountainside	51.58	83.01		Mountain Avenue (CR 635 north) to Sheffield Street	Interchange
Union	Springfield Township	52.04	83.75		CR 577 (Springfield Avenue) – Westfield, Springfield Township	Interchange
Union	Union Township	55.34– 55.71	89.06– 89.66		G.S. Parkway / Route 82 (Morris Avenue) – Paterson, Woodbridge, Union, Springfield	No eastbound access to GSP south/Route 82 west; no westbound access to GSP north; exit 140B on G.S. Parkway
Union	Union Township	56.16	90.38		G.S. Parkway north / Vaux Hall Road (CR 630) – Union Township, Millburn, Elizabeth	Interchange; GSP not signed northbound; exit 141 on G.S. Parkway
Union	Hillside	56.93	91.62		Bloy Street (CR 631) – Hillside	Interchange
Union	Hillside	58.04	93.41	Western end of freeway section		
Union	Hillside	58.04	93.41		Hillside, Irvington	Access via CR 628
Essex	Newark	59.46– 59.64	95.69– 95.98		Route 27 (Frelinghuysen Avenue) / Empire Street – Newark	
Essex	Newark	59.90	96.40		US 1-9 south – Main Terminals, Elizabeth	Eastbound exit and westbound entrance
Essex	Newark	60.22	96.91		Route 21 north – Newark	Eastbound exit and westbound entrance
Essex	Newark	60.53	97.41		I-78 / US 1-9 north to I-95 / N.J. Turnpike – Clinton, Holland Tunnel, North Area / South Area, Port Newark	Eastern terminus
1.000 mi = 1.609 km; 1.000 km = 0.621 mi: Concurrency terminus; Electronic toll collection; Incomplete access

== See also ==
U.S. Route 22
Previous state: Pennsylvania	New Jersey	Next state: Terminus
