= New Jersey Route 122 =

State highway in Warren County, New Jersey, United States

Route 122

Route information
- Auxiliary route of US 22
- Maintained by NJDOT and Warren County
- Length: 2.42 mi (3.89 km)
- Existed: 1993–present

Major junctions
- West end: CR 678 in Phillipsburg
- East end: I-78 / US 22 / Route 173 in Pohatcong Township

Location
- Country: United States
- State: New Jersey
- Counties: Warren

Highway system
- New Jersey State Highway Routes; Interstate; US; State; Scenic Byways
← US 122	→ Route 124

Route 122 is a short, 2.42-mile-long (3.89 km) state highway in Warren County, New Jersey. The route runs from Warren County Route 678 and Pursel Street in Phillipsburg to an intersection with U.S. Route 22 (US 22) in Pohatcong Township. The route is a former alignment of US 22, designated in 1926, however, until 1993, the route was designated U.S. Route 22 Alternate. After 1993, the route was decommissioned and replaced by County Route 678 (CR 648) and Route 122.

== Route description ==
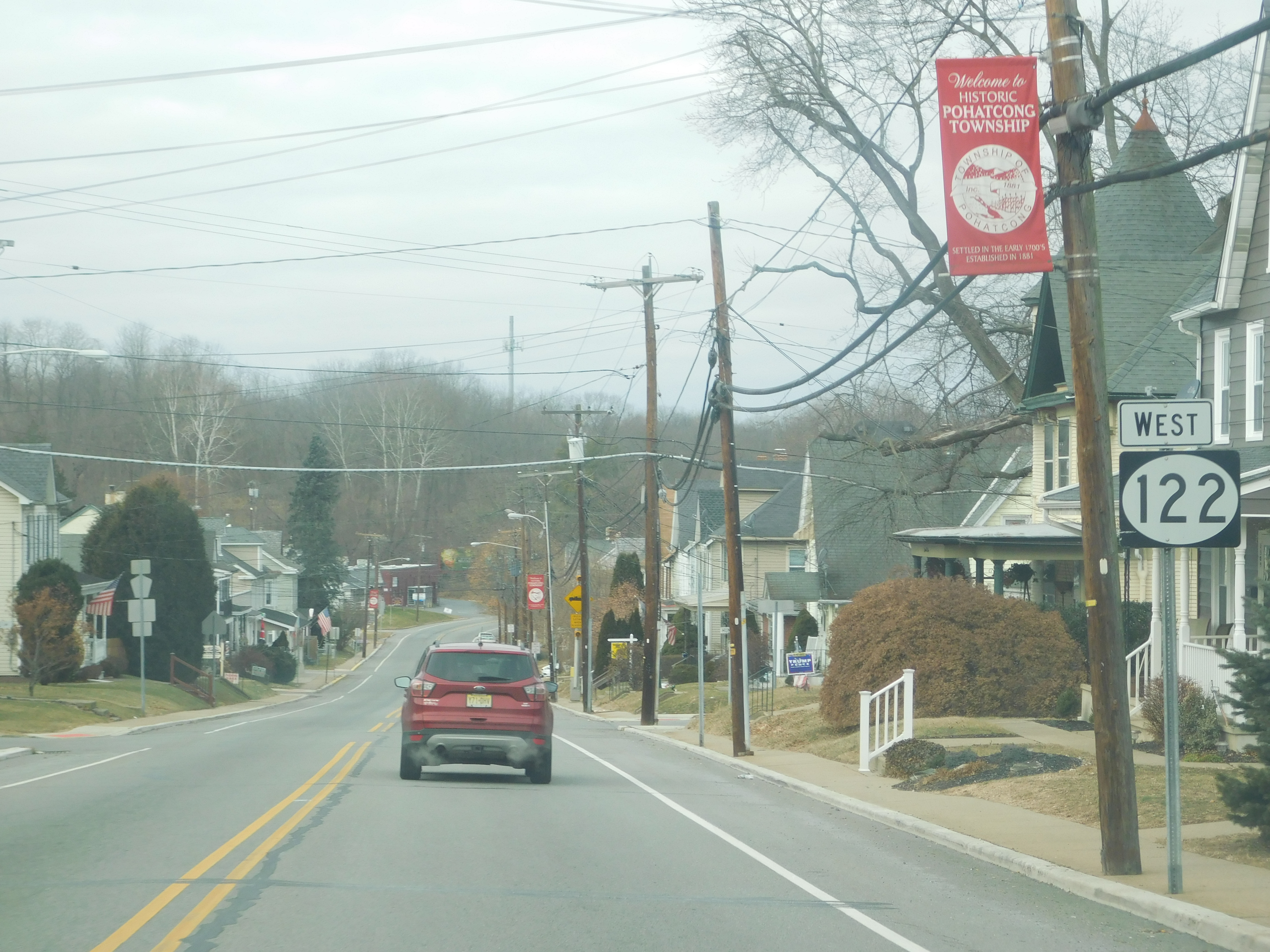
Route 122 westbound at the northwest end of its concurrency with CR 519 in Pohatcong Township

Route 122 begins at an intersection with Pursel Street as a county-maintained continuation of Warren County Route 678 in Phillipsburg. The highway progresses eastward as South Main Street, heading through residential homes along the Delaware River. At an intersection with Kent Street, it makes a gradual bend to the east, passing under Norfolk Southern's Lehigh Line, and then intersecting with Warren County Route 642 (Carpentersville Road).

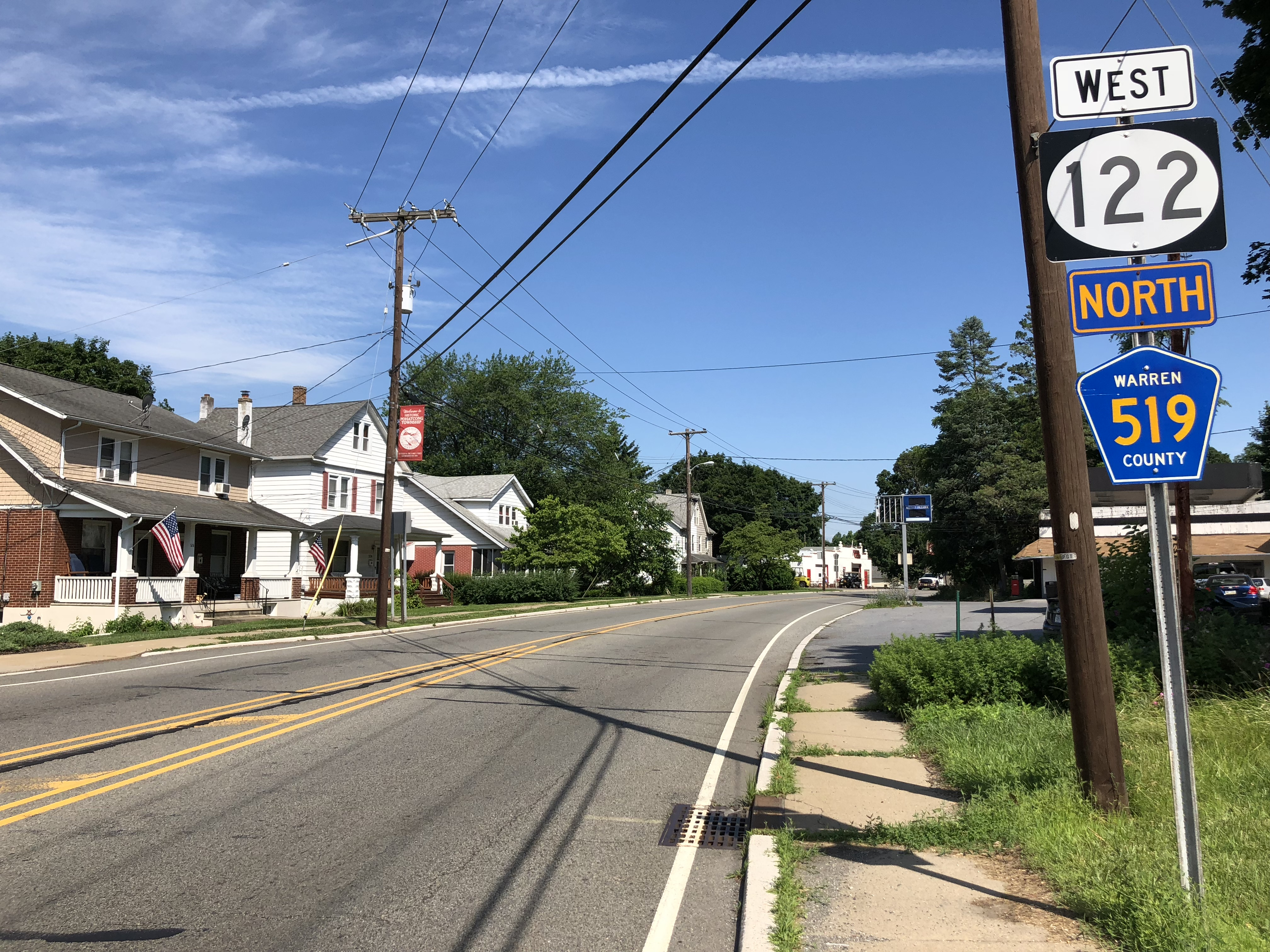
View west along Route 122 and north along CR 519 at the southeast end of the concurrency in Pohatcong Township

Continuing eastward along South Main Street, it enters Pohatcong Township where state maintenance begins. At first, the road passes residential homes; continuing eastward, the highway enters a large residential district, with homes surrounding the highway for several blocks. At the intersection with County Route 519 (Saint James Avenue), the two routes head along a wrong-way concurrency, running along New Brunswick Avenue, passing the residential district and several schools. At that point, the residential district becomes more commercial, with County Route 519 heading to the south along Third Avenue. The route continues eastward along New Brunswick Avenue, returning to the residential portions of Pohatcong Township. The route continues eastward, interchanging partially with U.S. Route 22, where the highway terminates. I-78 is located south of where the route ends. New Brunswick Avenue continues ahead without a designation. New Brunswick Avenue continues named Dumont Avenue, it continues until it reaches County Road 519.

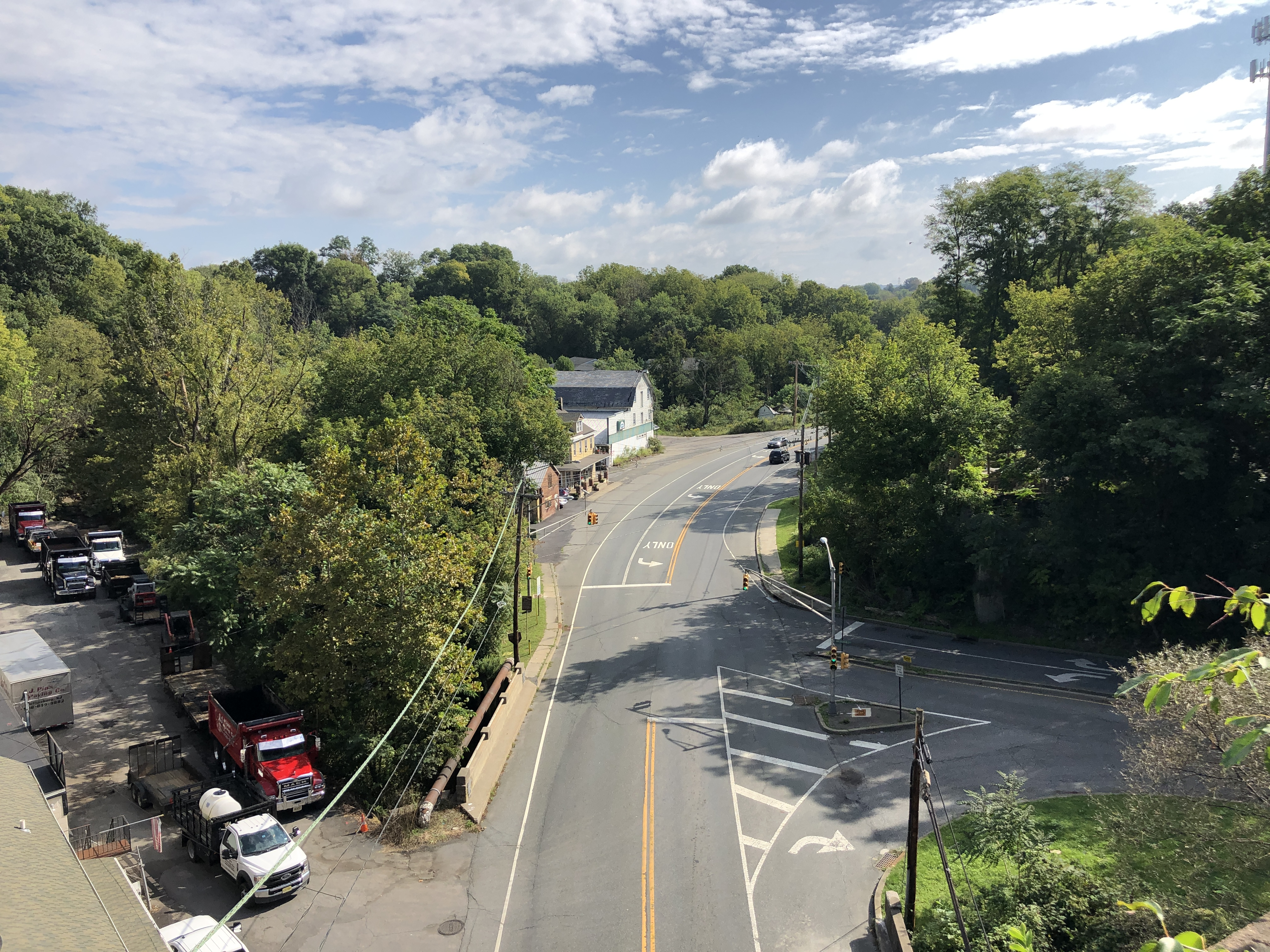
Route 122 eastbound in Phillipsburg

== History ==
Route 122 originated as an alignment of U.S. Route 22, and a remnant of Route 28, which was designated in 1926 as part of the highway system as the Phillipsburg–Easton Bridge. The route continued as U.S. Route 22 until the completion of the bypass in 1938 around Phillipsburg, which US 22 was transferred to the bypass. The former alignment became U.S. Route 22 Alternate, lasting through the 1953 state highway renumbering. The route continued to run from the Phillipsburg–Easton Bridge to US 22, until 1993, when US 22 Alternate was decommissioned and replaced by Route 122 and County Route 678. The route was first named Chester Avenue, it was then named Route 29. In 1915, the New Jersey established its first highway department, thus, giving funding to localities to improve their roads. Later, it was renamed Route 22.

== Major intersections ==
The entire route is in Warren County.

Location	mi	km	Destinations	Notes
Phillipsburg	0.00	0.00	CR 678 north (South Main Street)	Western terminus; southern terminus of CR 678
Pohatcong Township	1.19	1.92	CR 519 north (St. James Avenue)	Western end of CR 519 concurrency
Pohatcong Township	1.37	2.20	CR 519 south (Hawk Avenue) – Alpha	Eastern end of CR 519 concurrency
Pohatcong Township	2.42	3.89	I-78 / US 22 / Route 173 east	Eastern terminus; western terminus of Route 173; exit 3 on I-78
1.000 mi = 1.609 km; 1.000 km = 0.621 mi: Concurrency terminus
