= Alpha, New Jersey =

Borough in Warren County, New Jersey, US

- Borough
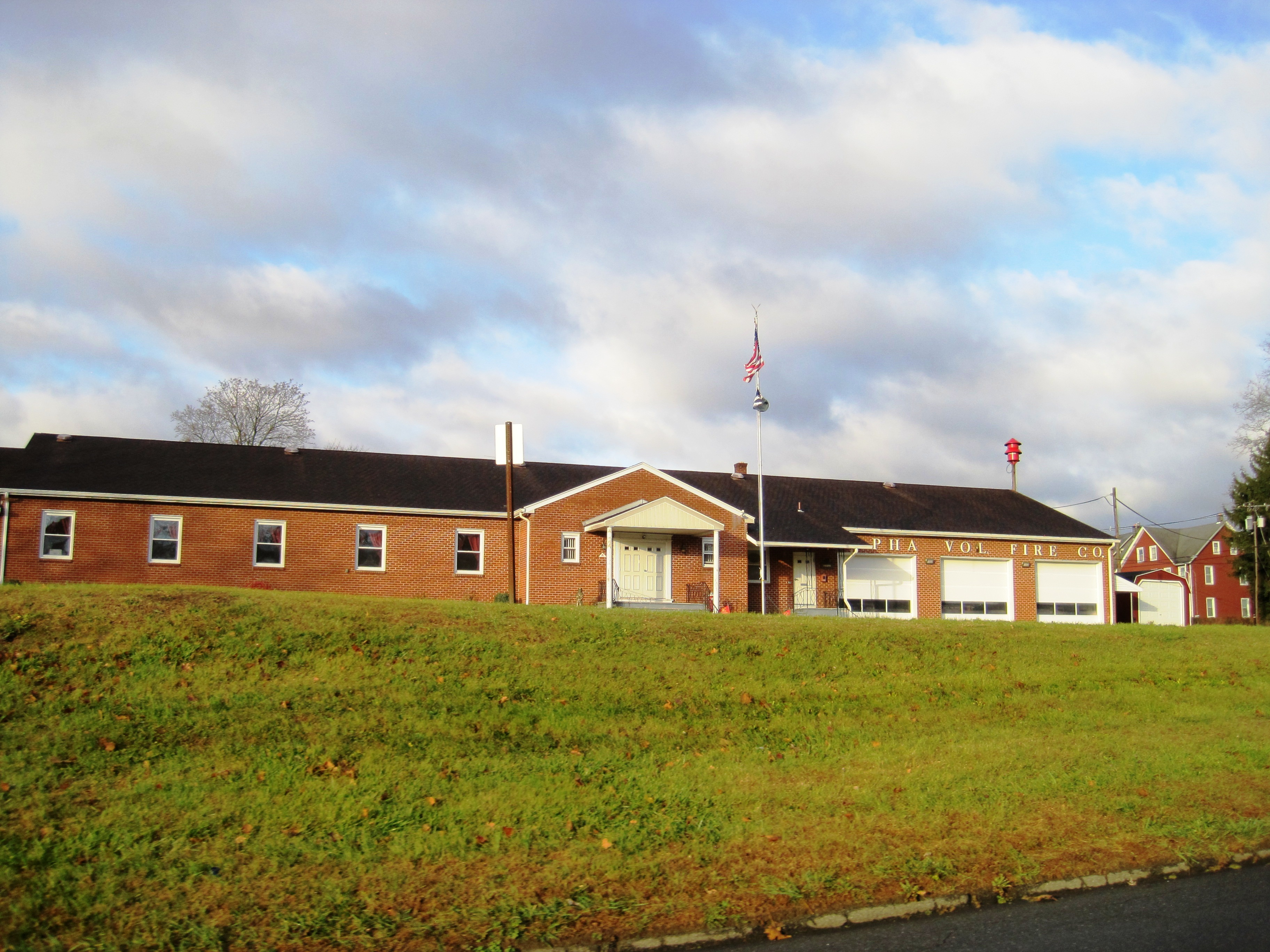
- Alpha Volunteer Fire Company

- Location of Alpha in Warren County highlighted in red (right). Inset map: Location of Warren County in New Jersey highlighted in orange (left).

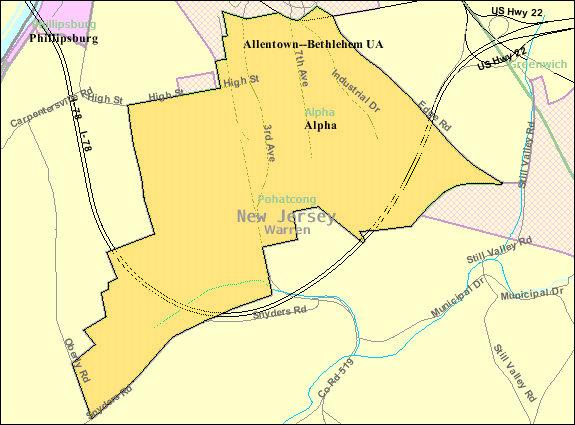
- Census Bureau map of Alpha, New Jersey

- Location in Warren County Location in New Jersey Location in the United States
- Coordinates: 40.659447°N 75.157052°W
- Country: United States
- State: New Jersey
- County: Warren
- Incorporated: June 26, 1911
- Named after: Alpha Cement Works

Government
  - Type: Borough
  - Body: Borough Council
  - Mayor: Joseph Schocko III (term ends December 31, 2027)
  - Municipal clerk: Donna L. Messina

Area
  - Total: 1.71 sq mi (4.44 km^{2})
  - Land: 1.68 sq mi (4.35 km^{2})
  - Water: 0.035 sq mi (0.09 km^{2}) 2.03%
  - Rank: 431st of 565 in state 21st of 22 in county
- Elevation: 269 ft (82 m)

Population (2020)
  - Total: 2,328
  - Estimate (2023): 2,348
  - Rank: 475th of 565 in state 19th of 22 in county
  - Density: 1,385.2/sq mi (534.8/km^{2})
  - Rank: 347th of 565 in state 5th of 22 in county
- Time zone: UTC−05:00 (Eastern (EST))
  - Summer (DST): UTC−04:00 (Eastern (EDT))
- ZIP Code: 08865
- Area code: 908
- FIPS code: 3404101030
- GNIS feature ID: 885138
- School district: Phillipsburg School District
- Website: www.alphaboronj.org

Alpha is a borough in Warren County, in the U.S. state of New Jersey. As of the 2020 United States census, the borough's population was 2,328, a decrease of 41 (−1.7%) from the 2010 census count of 2,369, which in turn reflected a decline of 113 (−4.6%) from the 2,482 counted in the 2000 census.

Alpha was incorporated as a borough from portions of Pohatcong Township by an act of the New Jersey Legislature passed on June 26, 1911, and signed by Governor Woodrow Wilson, based on the results of a referendum held on May 31, 1911. The borough was named for the Alpha Cement Works.

== History ==
Formally known as Vulcanite, Alpha was incorporated on June 26, 1911, but its history can be traced back to a much earlier date. At the time of the Great Blizzard of 1888, there were only seven houses in what is now the corporate limits of Alpha. The exact date on which the first house in Alpha is uncertain. One of the first homes in the community was a two-room log cabin constructed by the Pursel family beside an old Indian Trail on the former property of the Vulcanite Portland Cement Company, now New Brunswick Avenue.

Less than two years after incorporating, the community obtained a continuation of the streetcar line from Phillipsburg and electric street lights were installed.

== Geography ==
According to the U.S. Census Bureau, the borough had a total area of 1.72 square miles (4.44 km^{2}), including 1.68 square miles (4.35 km^{2}) of land and 0.04 square miles (0.09 km^{2}) of water (2.03%).

Unincorporated communities, localities and place names located partially or completely within the borough include Vulcanite.

The borough is completely surrounded by Pohatcong Township, making it part of 21 pairs of "doughnut towns" in the state, where one municipality entirely surrounds another.

== Demographics ==
Historical population
Census	Pop.	Note	%±
1920	2,140		—
1930	2,374		10.9%
1940	2,301		−3.1%
1950	2,117		−8.0%
1960	2,406		13.7%
1970	2,829		17.6%
1980	2,644		−6.5%
1990	2,530		−4.3%
2000	2,482		−1.9%
2010	2,369		−4.6%
2020	2,328		−1.7%
2023 (est.)	2,348	▲	0.9%
Population sources: 1920 1920–1930; 1940–2000; 2010 2020

=== 2020 census ===
As of the 2020 census, Alpha had a population of 2,328. The median age was 44.5 years. 19.0% of residents were under the age of 18 and 18.6% of residents were 65 years of age or older. For every 100 females there were 95.6 males, and for every 100 females age 18 and over there were 95.2 males age 18 and over.

98.0% of residents lived in urban areas, while 2.0% lived in rural areas.

There were 972 households in Alpha, of which 25.9% had children under the age of 18 living in them. Of all households, 47.5% were married-couple households, 18.5% were households with a male householder and no spouse or partner present, and 25.6% were households with a female householder and no spouse or partner present. About 28.7% of all households were made up of individuals and 14.2% had someone living alone who was 65 years of age or older.

There were 1,047 housing units, of which 7.2% were vacant. The homeowner vacancy rate was 1.9% and the rental vacancy rate was 8.0%.

Racial composition as of the 2020 census
Race	Number	Percent
White	1,982	85.1%
Black or African American	72	3.1%
American Indian and Alaska Native	1	0.0%
Asian	42	1.8%
Native Hawaiian and Other Pacific Islander	1	0.0%
Some other race	90	3.9%
Two or more races	140	6.0%
Hispanic or Latino (of any race)	211	9.1%

=== 2010 census ===
The 2010 United States census counted 2,369 people, 964 households, and 632 families in the borough. The population density was 1,417.2 per square mile (547.2/km^{2}). There were 1,032 housing units at an average density of 617.4 per square mile (238.4/km^{2}). The racial makeup was 93.12% (2,206) White, 2.41% (57) Black or African American, 0.00% (0) Native American, 1.52% (36) Asian, 0.00% (0) Pacific Islander, 1.18% (28) from other races, and 1.77% (42) from two or more races. Hispanic or Latino of any race were 5.28% (125) of the population.

Of the 964 households, 29.3% had children under the age of 18; 47.5% were married couples living together; 12.8% had a female householder with no husband present and 34.4% were non-families. Of all households, 29.1% were made up of individuals and 12.1% had someone living alone who was 65 years of age or older. The average household size was 2.45 and the average family size was 3.03.

22.7% of the population were under the age of 18, 7.8% from 18 to 24, 26.0% from 25 to 44, 27.9% from 45 to 64, and 15.6% who were 65 years of age or older. The median age was 40.6 years. For every 100 females, the population had 92.4 males. For every 100 females ages 18 and older there were 89.7 males.

The Census Bureau's 2006–2010 American Community Survey showed that (in 2010 inflation-adjusted dollars) median household income was $63,953 (with a margin of error of +/− $7,724) and the median family income was $73,929 (+/− $6,822). Males had a median income of $49,461 (+/− $3,100) versus $40,859 (+/− $5,262) for females. The per capita income for the borough was $28,567 (+/− $2,455). About 4.0% of families and 5.1% of the population were below the poverty line, including 9.8% of those under age 18 and 4.9% of those age 65 or over.

=== 2000 census ===
As of the 2000 United States census, there were 2,482 people, 989 households, and 688 families residing in the borough. The population density was 1,462.0 inhabitants per square mile (564.5/km^{2}). There were 1,034 housing units at an average density of 609.1 per square mile (235.2/km^{2}). The racial makeup of the borough was 97.06% White, 0.28% African American, 0.04% Native American, 1.21% Asian, 0.64% from other races, and 0.77% from two or more races. Hispanic or Latino of any race were 1.89% of the population.

There were 989 households, out of which 31.2% had children under the age of 18 living with them, 54.6% were married couples living together, 11.0% had a female householder with no husband present, and 30.4% were non-families. 26.9% of all households were made up of individuals, and 13.7% had someone living alone who was 65 years of age or older. The average household size was 2.50 and the average family size was 3.05.

In the borough, the population was spread out, with 24.4% under the age of 18, 6.0% from 18 to 24, 31.3% from 25 to 44, 20.7% from 45 to 64, and 17.5% who were 65 years of age or older. The median age was 38 years. For every 100 females, there were 94.8 males. For every 100 females age 18 and over, there were 90.1 males.

The median income for a household in the borough was $42,209, and the median income for a family was $45,435. Males had a median income of $39,957 versus $26,576 for females. The per capita income for the borough was $20,104. About 5.5% of families and 7.6% of the population were below the poverty line, including 14.1% of those under age 18 and 9.7% of those age 65 or over.

== Government ==
=== Local government ===
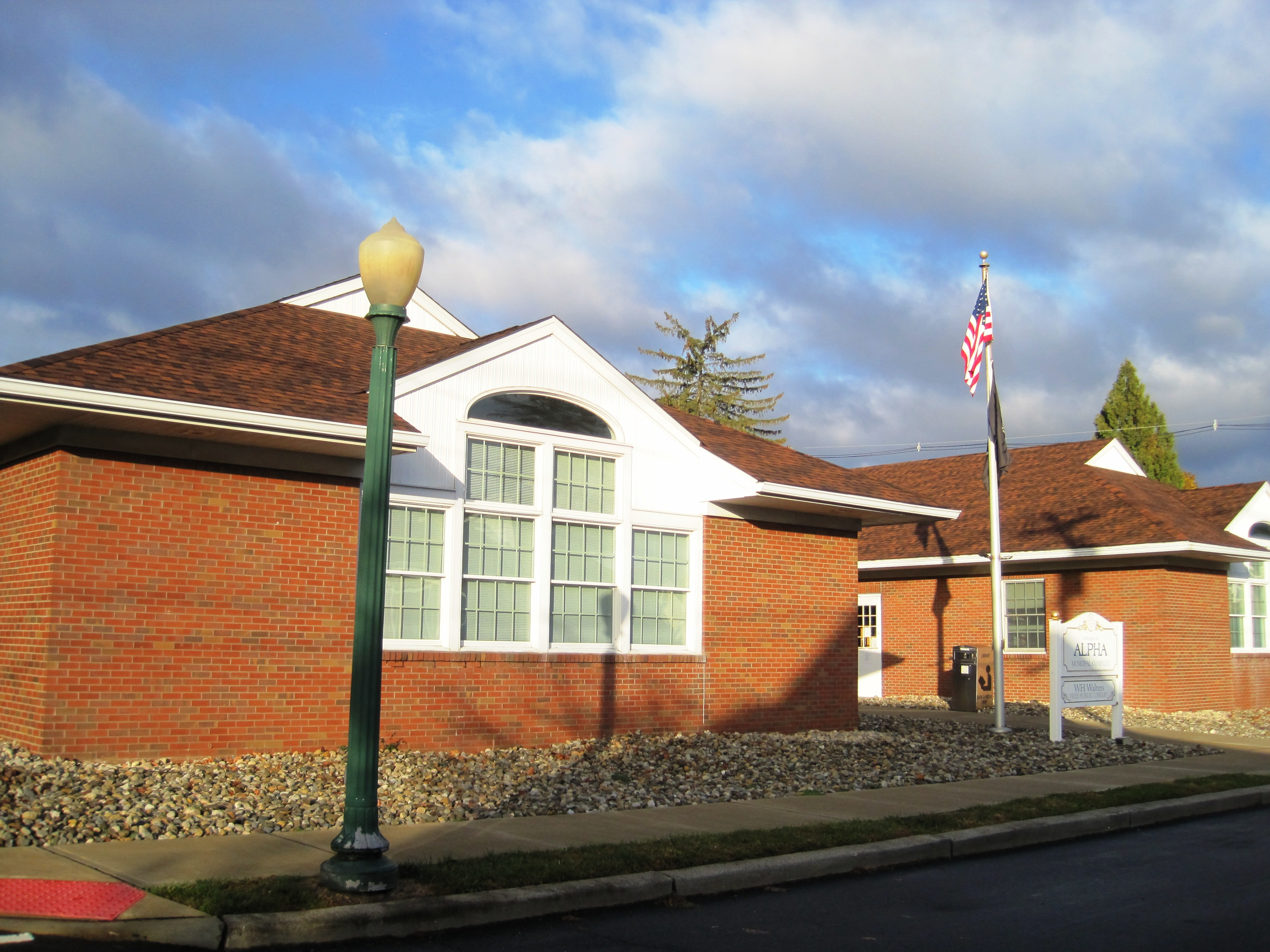
Alpha Municipal Complex

Alpha is governed under the borough form of New Jersey municipal government, which is used in 218 municipalities (of the 564) statewide, making it the most common form of government in New Jersey. The governing body is comprised of the mayor and the borough council, with all positions elected at-large on a partisan basis as part of the November general election. The mayor is elected directly by the voters to a four-year term of office. The borough council includes six members elected to serve three-year terms on a staggered basis, with two seats coming up for election each year in a three-year cycle. The borough form of government used by Alpha is a "weak mayor / strong council" government in which council members act as the legislative body with the mayor presiding at meetings and voting only in the event of a tie. The mayor can veto ordinances subject to an override by a two-thirds majority vote of the council. The mayor makes committee and liaison assignments for council members, and most appointments are made by the mayor with the advice and consent of the council.

As of 2022, the mayor of Alpha Borough is Republican Craig S. Dunwell, whose term of office ends December 31, 2023. Members of the Alpha Borough Council are Council President Robert J. Melick Jr. (R, 2023), Angela Bickar (I, 2022; elected to serve an unexpired term), Louis J. Cartabona (R, 2023), Todd W. Pantuso (R, 2022), Peter Petinelli (R, 2024) and Jodie Smith (R, 2024). Angela Bickar was elected to fill the seat expiring in December 2022 that had been held by Edward Hanics Jr.

Republican councilmember Jack Preiss and Democrat Kathleen Ronan, both serving terms ending in December 2018, resigned from office in September 2016. Preiss cited time conflicts with his work duties, while Ronan expressed her frustrations with working with the rest of the council. Louis Cartabona was chosen to fill the seat held by Preiss. In October, the council selected Jennifer Gable from a list of three nominees submitted by the Democratic municipal committee to fill Ronan's vacant seat. In the 2017 general election, Louis J. Cartabona and Alan Singleton were elected to serve the balance of the two unexpired terms of office.

Harry Zikas became the state's youngest mayor ever when he took office in 2000 at the age of 21. Zikas announced his resignation from office in September 2014, citing his acceptance of a job in Northern New Jersey. With Mayor Ed Hanics casting the tiebreaking vote, Tracy Grossman was selected in October 2014 to fill the remainder of Zikas's term of office.

In January 2014, the borough council selected Millard Rooks to fill the vacant seat expiring in December 2015 of Michael Savary, who had resigned after pleading guilty to disorderly tampering with public records.

=== Federal, state and county representation ===
Alpha is located in the 7th Congressional district and is part of New Jersey's 23rd state legislative district. Prior to the 2010 Census, Alpha had been part of the 5th Congressional District, a change made by the New Jersey Redistricting Commission that took effect in January 2013, based on the results of the November 2012 general elections.

For the 119th United States Congress, New Jersey's 7th congressional district is represented by Thomas Kean Jr. (R, Westfield). New Jersey is represented in the United States Senate by Democrats Cory Booker (Newark, term ends 2027) and Andy Kim (Moorestown, term ends 2031).

For the 2026–2027 session, the 23rd legislative district of the New Jersey Legislature is represented in the State Senate by Doug Steinhardt (R, Lopatcong Township) and in the General Assembly by John DiMaio (R, Hackettstown) and Erik Peterson (R, Franklin Township).

Warren County is governed by a three-member Board of County Commissioners, who are chosen at-large on a staggered basis in partisan elections with one seat coming up for election each year as part of the November general election. At an annual reorganization meeting held in the beginning of January, the board selects one of its members to serve as Commissioner Director and other as Deputy Director. As of 2025, Warren County's Commissioners are:

Deputy Director Jason J. Sarnoski (R, Lopatcong Township; 2025), Lori Ciesla (R, Lopatcong Township; 2026), and Director James R. Kern III (R, Pohatcong Township; 2027).

Constitutional officers of Warren County are: Clerk Holly Mackey (R, Alpha; 2027), Sheriff James McDonald Sr. (R, Phillipsburg; 2025) and Surrogate Michael J. Doherty (R, Washington; 2025).

=== Politics ===
As of March 2011, there were a total of 1,441 registered voters in Alpha, of which 548 (38.0% vs. 21.5% countywide) were registered as Democrats, 296 (20.5% vs. 35.3%) were registered as Republicans and 596 (41.4% vs. 43.1%) were registered as Unaffiliated. There was one voter registered to another party. Among the borough's 2010 Census population, 60.8% (vs. 62.3% in Warren County) were registered to vote, including 78.7% of those ages 18 and over (vs. 81.5% countywide).

Gubernatorial election results for Alpha
Year	Republican		Democratic		Third party(ies)	
Year	No.	%	No.	%	No.	%
2025	485	52.72%	424	46.09%	11	1.20%
2021	478	61.36%	293	37.61%	8	1.03%
2017	342	56.62%	241	39.90%	21	3.48%
2013	442	70.05%	170	26.94%	19	3.01%
2009	334	49.85%	251	37.46%	85	12.69%
2005	262	39.05%	372	55.44%	37	5.51%

In the 2012 presidential election, Democrat Barack Obama received 497 votes (51.1% vs. 40.8% countywide), ahead of Republican Mitt Romney with 436 votes (44.8% vs. 56.0%) and other candidates with 25 votes (2.6% vs. 1.7%), among the 973 ballots cast by the borough's 1,457 registered voters, for a turnout of 66.8% (vs. 66.7% in Warren County). In the 2008 presidential election, Republican John McCain received 470 votes (47.7% vs. 55.2% countywide), ahead of Democrat Barack Obama with 464 votes (47.1% vs. 41.4%) and other candidates with 18 votes (1.8% vs. 1.6%), among the 985 ballots cast by the borough's 1,408 registered voters, for a turnout of 70.0% (vs. 73.4% in Warren County). In the 2004 presidential election, Republican George W. Bush received 510 votes (50.1% vs. 61.0% countywide), ahead of Democrat John Kerry with 489 votes (48.0% vs. 37.2%) and other candidates with 12 votes (1.2% vs. 1.3%), among the 1,018 ballots cast by the borough's 1,369 registered voters, for a turnout of 74.4% (vs. 76.3% in the whole county).

United States presidential election results for Alpha
Year	Republican		Democratic		Third party(ies)	
Year	No.	%	No.	%	No.	%
2024	740	58.04%	512	40.16%	23	1.80%
2020	730	57.75%	515	40.74%	19	1.50%
2016	614	58.09%	386	36.52%	57	5.39%
2012	436	45.51%	497	51.88%	25	2.61%
2008	470	49.37%	464	48.74%	18	1.89%
2004	510	50.45%	489	48.37%	12	1.19%

In the 2013 gubernatorial election, Republican Chris Christie received 70.0% of the vote (442 cast), ahead of Democrat Barbara Buono with 26.9% (170 votes), and other candidates with 3.0% (19 votes), among the 651 ballots cast by the borough's 1,471 registered voters (20 ballots were spoiled), for a turnout of 44.3%. In the 2009 gubernatorial election, Republican Chris Christie received 334 votes (48.2% vs. 61.3% countywide), ahead of Democrat Jon Corzine with 251 votes (36.2% vs. 25.7%), Independent Chris Daggett with 64 votes (9.2% vs. 9.8%) and other candidates with 21 votes (3.0% vs. 1.5%), among the 693 ballots cast by the borough's 1,397 registered voters, yielding a 49.6% turnout (vs. 49.6% in the county).

United States Senate election results for Alpha1
Year	Republican		Democratic		Third party(ies)	
Year	No.	%	No.	%	No.	%
2024	680	55.56%	504	41.18%	40	3.27%
2018	504	59.02%	303	35.48%	47	5.50%
2012	376	43.32%	468	53.92%	24	2.76%
2006	263	42.56%	324	52.43%	31	5.02%

United States Senate election results for Alpha2
Year	Republican		Democratic		Third party(ies)	
Year	No.	%	No.	%	No.	%
2020	657	53.90%	515	42.25%	47	3.86%
2014	220	48.67%	208	46.02%	24	5.31%
2013	142	59.92%	89	37.55%	6	2.53%
2008	450	49.67%	438	48.34%	18	1.99%

== Education ==
Students in pre-kindergarten through eighth grade for public school attend the Alpha School District at Alpha School. As of the 2022–23 school year, the district, comprised of one school, had an enrollment of 179 students and 24.4 classroom teachers (on an FTE basis), for a student–teacher ratio of 7.3:1. In the 2016–2017 school year, Alpha had the 42nd smallest enrollment of any school district in the state, with 194 students.

Public school students in ninth through twelfth grades attend Phillipsburg High School in Phillipsburg, which serves students from Alpha as part of a sending/receiving relationship with the Phillipsburg School District. The high school also serves students from four other sending communities: Bloomsbury (in Hunterdon County), Greenwich Township, Lopatcong Township and Pohatcong Township. As of the 2022–23 school year, the school had an enrollment of 264 students and 22.0 classroom teachers (on an FTE basis), for a student–teacher ratio of 12.0:1.

Students from the borough and from all of Warren County are eligible to attend Ridge and Valley Charter School in Blairstown (for grades K–8) or Warren County Technical School in Washington borough (for 9–12), with special education services provided by local districts supplemented throughout the county by the Warren County Special Services School District in Oxford Township (for Pre-K–12).

== Transportation ==
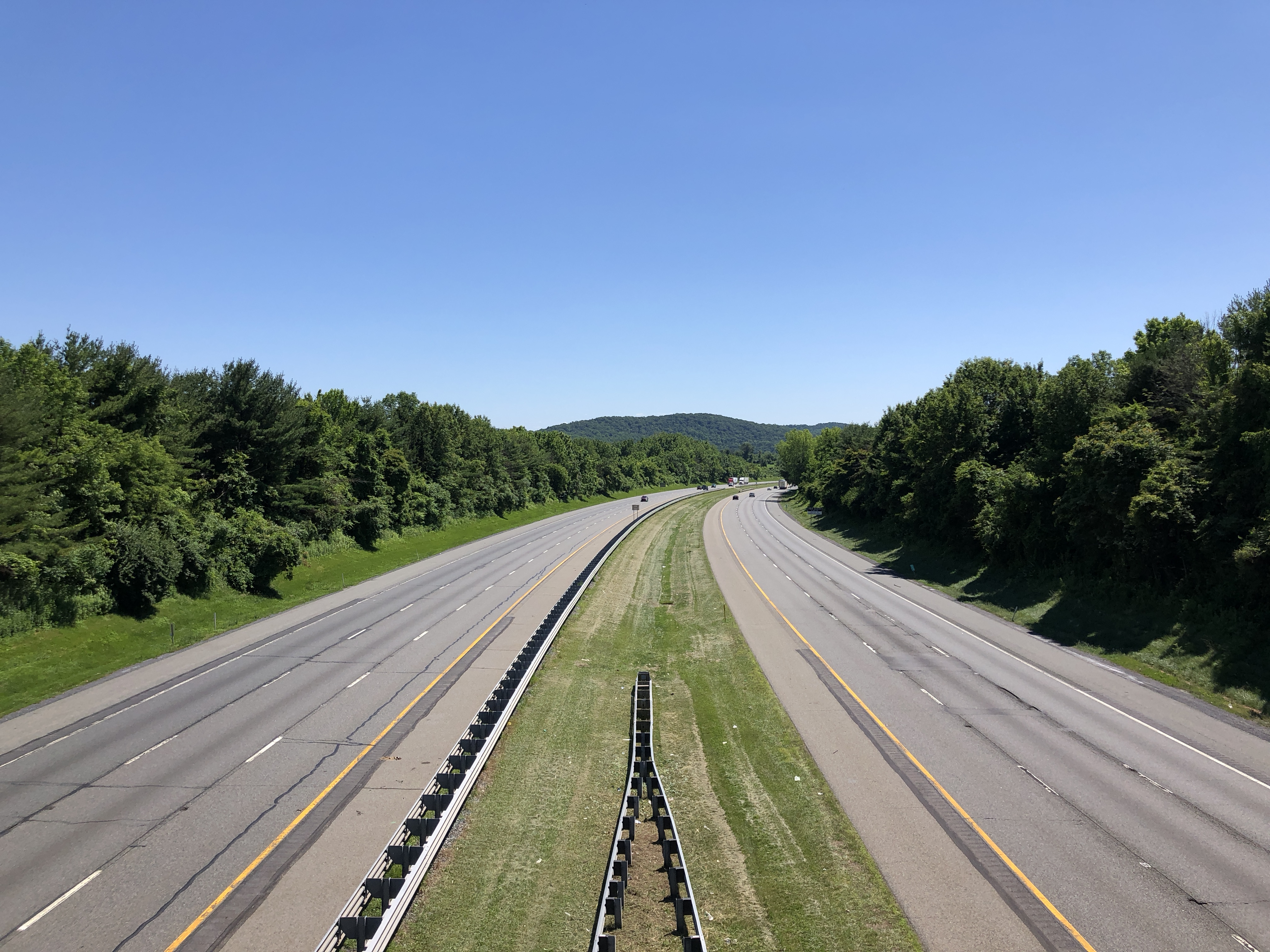
Interstate 78 westbound through Alpha

As of May 2010, the borough had a total of 21.40 miles (34.44 km) of roadways, of which 17.38 miles (27.97 km) were maintained by the municipality, 2.78 miles (4.47 km) by Warren County and 1.24 miles (2.00 km) by the Delaware River Joint Toll Bridge Commission. The main road that goes through is CR 519. Route 122 runs through briefly in the north.

While Interstate 78 passes through the southern portion of the borough, the closest access point is at US 22 in neighboring Pohatcong.

The Norfolk Southern Railway's Lehigh Line (formerly the mainline of the Lehigh Valley Railroad), runs through Alpha on its way to Phillipsburg, New Jersey.

== Notable people ==
People who were born in, residents of, or otherwise closely associated with Alpha include:

- Joe Buzas (1919–2003), Minor League Baseball executive who played one season with the New York Yankees
- Hector A. Cafferata Jr. (1929–2016), United States Marine who received the Medal of Honor for his actions at the Battle of Chosin Reservoir during the Korean War
- Jack Orchulli (born 1946), politician
- Jennie Somogyi (born 1977/78), ballet dancer who joined the New York City Ballet in 1993, at age 15, became a principal dancer in 2000, and retired in 2015
