= Killing of Timothy Wiltsey =

Death of New Jersey boy for which mother was prosecuted

Death of Timothy Wiltsey
- From 1991 missing-child flyer
- Date: last seen alive May 25, 1991
- Burial: Keyport, New Jersey
- Accused: Michelle Lodzinski
- Charges: Murder
- Trial: 2014
- Verdict: Guilty
- Convictions: Vacated on appeal, 2021
- Sentence: 30 years without parole

Timothy William "Timmy" Wiltsey (August 6, 1985 – remains recovered April 23, 1992) was a 5-year-old boy from South Amboy, New Jersey, United States, whose mother, Michelle Lodzinski, told police that he went missing from a carnival in nearby Sayreville on May 25, 1991. Police searches of the park where the carnival had been held failed to locate Wiltsey. Almost 11 months later, his remains were discovered across the Raritan River in the marshlands of nearby Edison, near an office park where Lodzinski had once worked.

Due to changes in her account of how her son disappeared within a month of his disappearance, and her unemotional demeanor on the few occasions she spoke publicly about the case, she began to be seen as a suspect. That perception intensified later in the decade when she was convicted of first staging her own kidnapping, and then again several years later of stealing a laptop from a former employer. Prosecutors did not bring charges against her until the 2010s, by which time she had remarried, had two more children, and moved to Florida, where she was arrested in 2014.

Wiltsey's remains were so decomposed when discovered that the cause of death could not be determined, and it was unclear when anyone besides Lodzinski had last seen him, making it difficult to connect her to any foul play or establish when and how it had taken place. Middlesex County prosecutors believed that a blanket found near the body was one that babysitters had seen in her house while the boy was alive. In 2016, after a trial that saw the jury foreman dismissed for doing independent research, she was convicted of first-degree murder and sentenced to 30 years without parole. The conviction was sustained on appeal.

In 2021, the New Jersey Supreme Court heard Lodzinski's case. Chief Justice Stuart Rabner recused himself, and the remaining judges deadlocked, leaving her most recent appeal, which had upheld her conviction, standing. The Court was persuaded to invoke a rarely-used rule allowing a rehearing with another judge temporarily designated a justice to hear the case so that a result can be reached. At the end of the year, a narrow majority vacated her conviction because the evidence was insufficient for a reasonable jury to convict her.

== Background ==
Wiltsey was born August 6, 1985, in Cedar Rapids, Iowa, to George Wiltsey of nearby Walker, and Michelle Lodzinski of Laurence Harbor, New Jersey. The two had met the year before when the 16-year-old Lodzsinki had come to visit her brother. They began dating, and Michelle became pregnant. Six months after giving birth, Lodzinski returned to her home with her infant son as his father had become abusive; she also disliked the isolation of Iowa. George had nothing to do with his son (at Lodzinski's request, he later testified; she returned any mail he sent his son) after Timothy went back to New Jersey with his mother, and did not pay any child support.

Lodzinski and her son lived with her sister and her husband in South Amboy for two years before she moved out to the first of three apartments in the same town she and Wiltsey lived in. She worked at a variety of low-paying jobs available to a single mother who had dropped out of high school in her late teens with minimal education and skills, primarily clerical and office work, plus retailing and as a bank teller. She declined to seek public assistance, instead accepting money from her father, and at some points she was working two jobs; she sometimes described herself to friends as a "weekend mom". Her landlady described her as "a hardworking single mother".

Lodzinski often relied on friends, family or paid sitters to watch Wiltsey while she was at work, but sometimes those arrangements fell through, and she took him to work with her. Employers and coworkers recalled that she frequently came in late. On other occasions, when she had to come home late, she forgot to call her sitters. In January 1990, Lodzinski's sister and brother-in-law, on whom she had relied extensively for childcare, moved to Florida, greatly complicating her arrangements. At one point, when Wiltsey was four, a brother in Minnesota took him in for two months so she could save money for his school tuition.

Her friends and family recall that she was devoted to Wiltsey, taking him to the dentist regularly, taking him on camping trips and other vacations, and saving up enough money to send him to kindergarten at private St. Mary's School when he reached school age. Once he was in school she helped him with his homework and regularly bought him new clothes. Wiltsey had attendance problems: he was absent 25 days that year and came in late on another 63.

Wiltsey was an issue between Lodzinski and two men she became romantically involved with during this period, to one of whom she became briefly engaged. While both of them said later that they liked both her and her son, they felt they were both too young themselves to commit to being his stepfather. The former fiancé did not believe Lodzinski was a properly attentive mother to Wiltsey; she impressed him as relating to him more like an older sister and was not surprised when the boy required 72 stitches to his face after being bitten by a dog next door as he had warned her about letting Wiltsey play outside in the backyard alone while the dog was loose. He became engaged to another woman a month before Wiltsey's disappearance.

Lodzinski's brother's girlfriend was also critical of some aspects of her parenting. On one occasion while Lodzinski was out late and she was watching Wiltsey, Lodzinski called and asked her to let the boy leave with a man the girlfriend did not know. After she refused, Lodzinski returned home and forced Wiltsey into a car driven by Lodzinski's boyfriend at the time, Fred Bruno. She believed Wiltsey was "terrified" of Bruno and told police she suspected him after Wiltsey's body was found (on the witness stand he denied any involvement in Wiltsey's death).

== Disappearance ==
On May 24, 1991, the Friday before that year's Memorial Day weekend, Lodzinski was planning for the end of the school year and the summer ahead. She took Wiltsey out shopping for new clothes to complement the kindergarten graduation gown he had already gotten, and made plans to visit her sister in Florida with her son and make a visit to Disney World after the school year ended. That evening, she told a neighbor about her plans to take Wiltsey, along with her brother's infant niece, to the South Amboy Elks Club carnival in nearby Sayreville's Kennedy Park the next day. The neighbor, and the niece's mother, both recalled that the two were in a good mood and looking forward to the upcoming events.

The following day the two were seen by a neighbor leaving their house around 11 a.m. This was the last time Wiltsey was seen alive by anyone who knew him other than Lodzinksi. She told law enforcement later that she and he went to a park in nearby Holmdel during the afternoon, where they played kickball, walked around the lake and visited the petting zoo.

Without picking up her niece, or calling the girl's mother, Lodzinski went straight to the carnival, and arrived there shortly after 7 p.m. Some unspecified time later, she encountered another niece, Jennifer Blair, with a friend. When they saw her looking around urgently, she told them she had lost sight of Wiltsey when she left him waiting in a carnival ride line as she went to buy a soda. The three went to report the incident to a Sayreville auxiliary police officer.

== Investigation ==
The carnival was immediately shut down. Police officers, firefighters, volunteers, and trained dogs immediately launched an exhaustive search of the carnival grounds and the surrounding area but found neither Wiltsey nor any evidence he had been in the area. A firefighter, who drove Lodzinski back to her house to get an item the dogs could use to get Wiltsey's scent, recalled that when she stopped at the bar her then-boyfriend worked at to tell him what had happened, Lodzinski was crying and speaking incoherently. The Sayreville police detective who took her home for the night after the search was suspended at 2 a.m. wrote in his report that she was tearful; her sister, whom she informed of Wiltsey's disappearance on the phone in the next couple of hours, says she cried. The next morning, after the search resumed, another detective at the station when she brought clothes for her son to wear if he were found, recalled her demeanor as distraught.

Over the next few days, police interviewed carnival workers and visitors to see if they had seen Wiltsey at the carnival. One worker said that shortly after 7 p.m. that evening, she had seen a boy wearing a red tank top and red printed shorts, similar to the clothes Lodzinski said Wiltsey had been wearing, come up to her stand and get called away by a woman. Roughly 10 minutes later she saw the same woman walking around alone calling out "Timmy" or "Jimmy" and looking concerned; she identified Wiltsey in a group picture and, upon seeing Lodzinski in person, said she might have been the woman.

Another carnival worker recalled helping a boy with a tank top, shorts, and sneakers with the Teenage Mutant Ninja Turtles on them off his ride around 7:15. He later told police it was definitely the boy he saw on posters. Three teenagers recalled telling a boy, accompanied by two men and a woman, in Ninja Turtles sneakers to watch out for broken glass on a pathway as they were leaving the carnival.

The day following the disappearance, Sayreville police searched her car, still parked near the carnival, and found nothing that would help. Two days later, the county prosecutor's office searched her house and found nothing; a similar FBI analysis of her garbage, turned over by her landlord, was also fruitless. Police also arranged to have a pen register tap placed on her home telephone to record the numbers of any incoming calls. (Note: Per the U.S. Supreme Court's decision in Smith v. Maryland, this does not require a warrant as callers do not have a reasonable expectation of privacy over numbers they dial or receive calls from since the numbers must be made known to the telephone company in order to complete the calls.)

Lodzinski, according to those regularly in contact with her during this time, was greatly affected by her son's unexplained absence from her life. She told her sister she could not sleep or eat. Bruno, her boyfriend, recalled her saying she could not "hold anything down." Within two weeks, she moved out of her house in South Amboy to avoid the media attention. "Everyone is waiting to see a grieving mother on TV break down, crying, hysterical because the public, they thrive on that stuff," she explained. "But I'm not going to do it."

George Wiltsey, at home in Iowa and still uninvolved in his son's life, was soon eliminated as a suspect in any potential wrongdoing. The case was televised twice on America's Most Wanted, and Timmy's photograph was circulated on thousands of missing-child flyers and milk cartons. In what a local newspaper called a "bitter irony", May 25 was National Missing Children's Day, an annual observance held on the anniversary of the 1979 disappearance of Etan Patz.

=== Inconsistent accounts by Lodzinski ===
Lodzinski reported to investigators that she and her son had spent time at Holmdel Park during the afternoon before driving to the evening carnival. According to the park police, the Holmdel lot where she claimed to have parked was closed that day. Police said at the time they could find no one who had seen her son that night. One witness later testified: "I spoke with her and she did not have a child with her. I was very upset. There was a child missing and there was no child." The last confirmed sighting of Wiltsey by anyone other than Lodzinski was the neighbor who saw him that morning.

More than a week later, at a police interview in Sayreville, Lodzinski claimed two men with a knife had taken her son and intimidated her into silence; pressed for further details, she walked out and challenged police to charge her. Later that day, she returned to the police station, with her sister and a friend, and recanted the story, as the police began to consider her a leading suspect. She returned the following day and, during a long and confrontational interview gave a third story, that two men and a woman had taken her son after offering to watch him briefly while she got sodas, so he could keep his place in line for a ride. Lodzinski claimed to have known the woman as Ellen, a local go-go dancer and customer of the bank where Lodzinski had previously worked as a teller. The FBI was unable to locate the woman.

The police arranged with Bruno for him to call Lodzinski while they listened in to a call where he challenged her on her story. She said she would not talk with him about it over the phone and asked instead that they discuss it in person. The following day, they met in Bruno's car, where a microphone was planted for the police to listen in. She reiterated the last account she had given police, about Ellen and her companions abducting Wiltsey, adding that she had not told that story at first because she was afraid people would think her a bad mother for leaving her son with a woman she barely knew, even briefly. (Note: Bruno said that in an earlier conversation between the two of them, one he did not record, she had told the version in which Timothy was abducted at knifepoint.)

The following day, Lodzinksi was interviewed again by the state police for five hours. She repeated the Ellen story, but this time amended it. In this version one of the men with Ellen had put the knife to her throat. Challenged on this version, she again ended the interview and told police to charge her if that was what they wanted to do. Taken back to the Sayreville police for further questioning, she told the same story, adding that she had been told her son would be returned to her unharmed in a month if she kept quiet. When the interview ended at 9 p.m., Lodzinski, who had not eaten in 12 hours, was taken to the hospital by friends as she appeared to be suffering a mental breakdown.

Another interview by an investigator with the county prosecutor's office at Lodzinski's home five days later had a similar outcome. The investigator recalled her as increasingly hostile, giving short answers while retelling the same story. Lodzinski then burst into tears and, saying that her son was "the most important thing in the world to me", told the investigator to leave. Before Wiltsey's birthday in early August led to renewed media interest, Lodzinski went to visit her sister in Florida for two weeks, where she sought counseling.

== Physical evidence ==
On October 26 that year, schoolteacher Dan O'Malley was birdwatching and exploring marshlands in the Raritan Center business park in Edison, across the Raritan River from Sayreville. He discovered a child's Teenage Mutant Ninja Turtles sneaker. Recalling that Wiltsey had been described as wearing them when last seen, and thinking it unlikely that a child would have been walking or playing in an area so far from any houses, he took it to the Sayreville police. The sneaker was shown to Lodzinski, who told them it did not look like her son's. It was then stored as evidence. After weeks with no word from the police, O'Malley reported the sneaker to a local newspaper, The Home News of New Brunswick, resulting in a front-page story and FBI forensic testing.

The newspaper report of a possible break in the case led Lodzinski to call police again and say that the sneaker might indeed have been her son's. She had earlier provided the box the shoes had come in, and the sneaker matched the specifications on the box's label as to what shoes had come in it. A search of the area in November yielded no further evidence. Forensic testing of the shoe was inconclusive.

In March 1992, Ron Butkiewicz of the FBI, who had replaced the agent originally assigned to the case, interviewed Lodzinski, who this time had counsel present. She reiterated the Ellen story she had previously told; Butkiewicz recalled her as doing so without any outward emotion. The following month, he interviewed O'Malley, who showed him where the sneaker was found, and agreed it was unlikely to have come there from a local child.

Upon re-interviewing Lodzinski's friends and family, Butkiewicz learned that three years earlier, she had worked for six months at a fulfillment center in Raritan Center, and taken frequent walks at the Raritan Center complex, within a few blocks of where the sneaker was found, information Lodzinski had not included in an employment history she had given police earlier in the investigation. The next day, when Butkiewicz asked for her employment history, she included the fulfillment company.

Over April 23–24, 1992, law enforcement teams conducted a full search of the mostly marshy area near Olympic Drive in Raritan Center. They quickly located a matching second sneaker in Timmy's size, roughly 150 feet (46 m) from where the first sneaker had been found, with a nearby pillowcase. Two hours later, 400–550 feet (120–170 m) further away, they found a skull and 10 other bones in and around a truck tire dredged from the bottom of Red Root Creek, near pieces of his clothing, a pillowcase, a Ninja Turtles balloon, and a 10-by-3-foot (3.05 by 0.91 m) blue and white blanket buried in the embankment 10–20 feet (3.0–6.1 m) above the creekbed where the bones were located. When Butkiewicz pulled the blanket from the dirt, he had not photographed its appearance before doing so, and shook the dirt from it afterwards.

Wiltsey's identity was confirmed through dental records. The county medical examiner ruled the death a homicide, although the time, location, and medical cause of death could not be determined due to advanced decomposition. Lodzinski was informed that night of the identification; Butkiewicz said she was again unemotional. Asked to explain why the remains were 0.4 mi (640 m) (Note: In straight-line distance. It is a longer walk or drive from her work address to where the body was found.) from a former workplace about which she had not initially told police, she said her walks on break at the fulfillment company were limited to the immediate vicinity of the building and she was unaware Olympic Drive, the street nearest to the body, even existed.

Testing in the FBI lab did not reveal any trace evidence on the items found in the search. Neither Lodzinski nor her parents recognized the blanket as having come from her house. It is not known whether the pillowcase was shown to anyone who might recognize it.

A funeral Mass for Wiltsey was held in South Amboy in May 1992; Lodzinski appeared shaken during the service and required the physical support of her parents. He was buried in nearby Keyport. A week after the service, it became public knowledge that she had, almost a year earlier, changed her account of how her son disappeared three times, and failed two lie detector tests, as well as her unemotional demeanor under more recent questioning. One of the polygraph administrators described her results as "all over the charts" but found her defiant attitude even more disturbing. Her brother Edward said that she knew she had failed the test and was angry enough to throw things.

== Later developments ==
One day in January 1994, Lodzinski's car was found idling, with its door open, at the Woodbridge home she shared with her brother. Her family reported her missing and feared she, too, might have been kidnapped. The next day, she walked up to police on a street in Detroit, Michigan, claiming she had been released after being abducted by men who had posed as FBI agents "to teach her a lesson for talking about Timmy."

Two weeks after she returned home, Edward found an FBI business card on her door with the message "It's not over." Agent Butkiewicz resumed his investigation and found a local print shop that had recently printed FBI business cards for Lodzinski. She admitted to faking her own kidnapping by taking a bus to Detroit, but refused to further discuss her contradictory accounts of Timmy's disappearance and was sentenced in March 1995 to six months house arrest and three years probation for the FBI hoax. Police in Sayreville believed she had staged the kidnapping to avoid being subpoenaed in the investigation of her boyfriend, a police officer for neighboring Union County who had been accused of improperly checking the license plate numbers of vehicles Lodzinski claimed had been following her. In May the department decided not to take any action against him over the allegations.

In 1997, pregnant with her second child, Lodzinski pleaded guilty to stealing a computer from a former employer to give to her police officer boyfriend as a Christmas gift (he had realized as soon as he received it that it was stolen, and reported it). She was again sentenced to house arrest (four months this time) and three more years of probation after having to spend a day in jail. Immediately after that sentence was handed down in 1998 she moved to Florida, then in 1999 to Apple Valley, Minnesota, a suburb of Minneapolis where she was married in 2001 and started a new family.

That year, she told a Star-Ledger reporter who visited her there that she was getting on with her life, but continued to hold out hope that the case could be resolved "so everyone will know I was telling the truth." Pressed as to which story she told was the truth, she said that she had told the police "different things at different times based on things they said to me. I wasn't involved" and refused to go into more detail after briefly reiterating that it had started when she was "at a stand." The marriage did not last long and, pregnant with her third child, she returned to Florida in 2003, where she bought a small home in Port St. Lucie. She worked as a paralegal, and displayed a picture of Wiltsey prominently in the house and told her sons he was their brother.

== Renewed investigation in early 2010s ==
In the early 2010s the case files and evidence remained where they were stored, and the county prosecutor's office did little more than follow up on occasional tips. After one around the 20th anniversary of Wiltsey's disappearance proved to have no bearing on the case, Scott Crocco, an investigator with the office, decided it was time to review the investigation and see if anything had been overlooked that might resolve the case. He focused on the blanket, which had only been shown to Lodzinski and her parents at the time of the disappearance, and the pillowcase, both found near Wiltsey's remains. Investigators reasoned that the boy would not have been carrying a large blanket through a carnival on the humid 90 °F (32 °C) day when he disappeared, and they concluded that the blanket was taken from Lodzinski's South Amboy home, for covering the boy after his death, despite her denial of ever having such a blanket.

Crocco interviewed Jennifer Blair-Dilcher, the niece who had encountered Lodzinski at the carnival shortly after she said she could not find her son, shortly after reopening the case. In the intervening years Blair-Dilcher, who had initially been supportive of her aunt, had married and had two children of her own, but also became addicted to heroin. She had gone down to Florida for rehabilitation, and let her children live with Lodzinski in the meantime. While Blair-Dilcher was in the program, Lodzinski and Blair-Dilcher's mother decided that Blair-Dilcher's condition was serious enough that they could not return her children after she completed the program, so they turned them over to Blair-Dilcher's mother-in-law, whom Blair-Dilcher greatly disliked. It took Blair-Dilcher some time to get custody of her children back, and she considered Lodzinski's decision to have been a "betrayal".

At Crocco's behest, Blair-Dilcher began communicating with her aunt on Facebook about the case in the hope that Lodzinski might confess or make some incriminating statements. After that failed, Crocco showed Blair-Dilcher the blanket, pillowcase and a red jacket. She immediately told him that the blanket had been in Lodzinski's apartment and Wiltsey had wrapped himself in it on the occasions when she had babysat him. Blair-Dilcher's mother, Edward Lodzinski, and another friend of Lodzinski's who had been in her apartment on numerous occasions in the early 1990s did not recognize the blanket. Hairs recovered from the blanket and pillowcase did not match Lodzinski's DNA.

== Arrest, trial, and sentencing ==
On August 6, 2014, which would have been Timmy's 29th birthday, following a sealed indictment by a grand jury, Lodzinski was arrested in Florida and charged with her son's murder. After reviewing extensive legal arguments from the defense and prosecution, New Jersey Superior Court Judge Dennis Nieves issued a key pretrial ruling that "Lodzinski's active omission and hindrances to the investigation through her statements may reasonably establish circumstantial evidence of her guilt." Other evidence was excluded: New Jersey does not allow failed polygraph tests as evidence in criminal trials, and Nieves also ruled that Lodzinski's self-kidnapping hoax could not be presented to the jury. He also disallowed the prosecution from presenting an expert witness on women who kill their children.

As the trial approached, Crocco continued to build the case. Lodzinski's brother Michael, her former fiancé from that time and her landlady did not recognize the blanket. Shortly before the trial, with coverage increasing in the media, a friend of Blair-Dilcher's who had "once in a while" babysat Wiltsey and had initially recalled a blanket with a different pattern identified the blanket from the Raritan Center site as one she had seen in the house in the early 1990s. The week afterwards, another woman who in her teens had occasionally babysat Wiltsey also told police the blanket was in the house at the time. Photographs of the interior of the house from when Lodzinski lived there showed different blankets.

The criminal trial began in March 2016. Prosecutors presented the case history from 1991, focusing jurors' attention on the changes in Lodzinski's story, her omission of Florida Fulfillment from her work history, and her unemotional demeanor later on in the case, particularly when she was told that Wiltsey's body had been found. A woman who recalled waiting in line, and briefly chatting, with Lodzinski at the carnival testified that she did not see Wiltsey, nor did Lodzinski speak of him.

Prosecutors also presented Blair-Dilcher and the witnesses who put the blanket in Lodzinski's home at that time, and established that tides could not have washed the body up the creek from the river; the defense responded with a forensic expert who, based on his review of the documents and photographs of the blanket, doubted that any connection to the case could be made, or that it had been there as long as the remains had been; Butkiewicz concurred that he was never conclusively able to link the evidence to Lodzinski. Geetha Natarajan, the county's retired medical examiner, testified that while the cause of death could not be determined from the remains, based on other factors and the unlikeliness of any other cause she had ruled it a homicide. Her testimony was based on a review of the photographs of the remains and the report of the coroner who examined them, as he was now dead.

Lodzinski's defense also put on an Arizona man who claimed that a former cellmate, from Georgia, had confessed to him that he had raped and murdered a young boy somewhere up near "Atlanta City." It did not offer any proof that the man had been in the Sayreville area at the time of Wiltsey's disappearance, and the man himself denied it on the stand. Prosecutors also cast doubt on the Arizona man's testimony by noting that he had accused the other man of sexually assaulting him. Another witness testified for the defense about a possible third party, a resident of an apartment complex near the carnival who, the evening Wiltsey disappeared, saw several men throw something roughly 4 ft (1.2 m) long, wrapped in white cloth, into the trunk of a car and then drive away quickly without turning their headlights on.

After testimony from 68 witnesses, the jury began deliberations in May. Five hours after they began, one juror alerted Nieves that the foreman had been doing independent investigations. When the judge asked him, the foreman confirmed that he had been looking up FBI evidence collection protocols from the early 1990s on his laptop; he was dismissed and an alternate seated. A defense motion for a mistrial was denied.

The next day, a week before the 25th anniversary of Wiltsey's disappearance, the jury returned a guilty verdict on the charge of first-degree murder. Sentencing was scheduled for August 2016 and then postponed, as Lodzinski's attorney appealed the judge's earlier rulings on juror misconduct and insufficient evidence. The defense moved shortly afterwards for judgment notwithstanding the verdict (JNOV), asking Nieves to set aside the conviction and enter an acquittal on the grounds that the evidence was insufficient for a reasonable jury to have convicted; He denied it, and then in January 2017, he sentenced Lodzinski to 30 years in state prison without possibility of parole.

== Appeals ==
Lodzinski was committed to the Edna Mahan Correctional Facility for Women near Clinton, New Jersey's only women's prison, to begin serving her sentence. She appealed both the judge's refusal to grant a mistrial after the jury foreman's dismissal and his denial of JNOV, and argued that the 23-year delay in bringing the case had been unduly prejudicial.

A three-judge panel of the state's Appellate Division ruled against her on all the issues in 2019. She appealed to the Supreme Court of New Jersey, where an unusually complicated process ensued after it heard arguments late in 2020. After the court's Chief Justice, Stuart Rabner, recused himself from hearing the case, the remaining six justices agreed in May 2021 that the appeals court had applied a standard of review to the evidence that was too narrow, but deadlocked on whether the evidence itself was sufficient to sustain the conviction. Lodzinski petitioned for a rehearing on the grounds that her conviction should not be allowed to stand on unconstitutional grounds, and that October the Court reheard it, with the state's chief appellate judge designated to stand in for Rabner. His vote broke the deadlock, and the Supreme Court reversed the appellate court and granted JNOV just before the end of the year.

=== Appellate Division ===
In April 2019, the Appellate Division of the state's Superior Court heard Lodzinski's appeal. Judges Carmen Messano, Douglas M. Fasciale and Lisa Rose were empaneled to decide it. Four months later, they unanimously upheld both trial court rulings, allowing the conviction to stand.

The panel first considered the sufficiency of the evidence, under the standard that it must be evaluated in the light most favorable to the state, with inferences conceivably made by the jury from the evidence deemed rational if they were more likely to be true than not, even if reasonable doubt still existed, conceding that defense evidence "was substantial and in many ways directly rebutted the State's proofs." Since Lodzinski had not challenged the admission of any evidence, they did not consider that issue.

Writing for the panel, Messano admitted it was a "close question" as to whether the state, as Lodzinski argued, had failed to prove she had caused Wiltsey's death purposely and knowingly, as state law required for a murder conviction. "The State's arguments in response largely miss the mark" he wrote, but after explaining why its precedents were inapposite he agreed that jurors could have reasonably inferred that the concealment of Wiltsey's body indicated his death had been deliberately caused and that Lodzinski, the last person seen with him, was responsible. Her inconsistent statements and omission of Florida Fulfillment from her work history could also have supported a jury's inference that she had killed Wiltsey, Messano added.

Lodzinski argued that the delay in bringing the case specifically injured her by allowing the state to find more witnesses for the blanket than it had in 1992. Also, one of her witnesses, who reported seeing Wiltsey at the carnival, was unable to testify in person due to her age and inability to travel, so she testified via Skype; another could not remember that evening and Lodzinski had to suffice with reading her contemporaneous account to the jury.

Messano found no harm to Lodzinski in the delay. There was no evidence the state had delayed the trial to its advantage, and "[a]t most, the State's failure to show the blanket to more people in 1992, when investigators showed it only to defendant and her parents, evidences negligence." The shortcomings of the two witnesses did not prevent Lodzinski from presenting other witnesses who had seen Wiltsey or a boy matching his description at the carnival. Messano also noted that the delay helped her defense in that she was able to locate the Arizona man who claimed his cellmate had confessed the killing to him.

After recounting the circumstances of the foreman's removal, Messano held that that was the appropriate remedy as Nieves had found that deliberations had not gone on long enough for the jurors to have formed opinions or the dismissed foreman's to have had a significant impact on other jurors. He also noted that Lodzinski had not established a basis for mistrial on her other theory, that the juror had been seen as leaning towards a not guilty verdict, beyond a newspaper report that the remaining jurors told the newly seated alternate such.

=== State Supreme Court ===
In October 2020, the New Jersey Supreme Court heard the case, with oral argument held online due to the COVID-19 pandemic. To the issues she had appealed from the trial court, Lodzinski added one from the Appellate Division's opinion: that it had improperly limited its review of the evidence to the prosecution case when considering the reasonableness of the conviction. Chief Justice Stuart Rabner recused himself as he had worked in the office of the U.S. Attorney for New Jersey at the time Wiltsey disappeared and the FBI was assisting in the investigation. In May 2021 the justices deadlocked, leaving the conviction standing.

==== Deadlocked first decision ====
The Court issued a short per curiam opinion stating the outcome. While the Court had deadlocked on the JNOV motion, its other two rulings were unanimous. All the justices upheld the lower court on the mistrial issue, while agreeing with Lodzinski that it should have considered all the evidence in the trial record rather than just that introduced by the prosecution.

===== Concurrence =====
Justice Anne M. Patterson wrote a concurring opinion, joined by Faustino J. Fernandez-Vina and Lee Solomon, explaining both why the wrong standard had been used and why they believed Lodzinski to have been properly convicted. On the first question, Patterson wrote that the Appellate Division had relied on a precedent that could be distinguished as arising from a motion for a directed verdict, usually made after the state has rested and the defense has yet to present its case. The Appellate Division should have relied on a more recent case, she wrote. The court's clear holding here brought New Jersey's standard in line with the federal standard for post-conviction appellate review. as held by the U.S. Supreme Court in Jackson v. Virginia over four decades earlier.

Patterson found nothing to add to the Appellate Division's rejection of the argument about the jury foreman. She considered it reasonable for a jury to have inferred that Wiltsey was killed around the time he disappeared and his body was dumped where it was found later. Patterson acknowledged that the defense had cast considerable doubt on Blair-Dilcher's blanket testimony, but the jury could reasonably have found the other two babysitters' accounts to have supported that claim. Lodzinski's changing accounts of the last time she saw Wiltsey and her omission of Florida Fulfillment from the work history she gave police until after the first sneaker was found nearby could also reinforce a theory of her guilt, Patterson said. If Wiltsey had indeed been kidnapped, she found it unlikely that Lodzinski would have left it to her visiting neighbor to check her answering machine for messages despite a visible indicator that a message had been received, nor would she have gone on two vacations in the months afterwards.

The defense's evidence that Lodzinski had been an attentive and caring mother did not by itself cast doubt on the state's theory that Wiltsey was an economic and social burden to his mother and thus she had a motive to kill him, Patterson continued, as she reviewed the defense case in the light most favorable to the state. Since none of the witnesses who testified as to having seen a boy matching Wiltsey's description at the carnival were consistently positive it had been him, the jury was also free to give greater weight to the testimony of a single witness who saw a boy playing with a basketball alone at the Holmdel Park that afternoon to infer that Wiltsey had in fact never been at the carnival.

===== Dissent =====
Justice Barry Albin wrote a lengthy dissent for himself, Jaynee LaVecchia and Fabiana Pierre-Louis. "The direct and inferential evidence—viewed in the light most favorable to the State—cannot rationally justify the murder conviction of Michelle Lodzinski", he wrote. "In the modern annals of New Jersey legal history ... to my knowledge, no murder conviction has ever been upheld on such a dearth of evidence."

Albin expressed serious doubts about the blanket testimony given its improper handling when found, the failure of those it was shown to after being found to recognize it, and the biases, conscious or not, of the three witnesses who did over two decades later. Even if the jury had, as Patterson said they could have, credited those latter witnesses, he also said that while they may have considered Natarajan's testimony to have rationally established homicide as the cause of death through process of elimination, any inference that Lodzinski had purposely and knowingly murdered Wiltsey from that testimony was purely speculative and thus not reasonable, especially since Natarajan had testified that she could not identify a cause of death from the photographs and remains alone.

As for the prosecution's motive evidence, Albin not only found it not credible but based on "a gender stereotype about single working mothers." The notion that she wanted Wiltsey out of her life intensely enough to kill him was not only speculative but contradicted the considerable evidence adduced that she was, if imperfectly, a caring and attentive mother who wanted the best for her son. In addition, Albin pointed to state precedent that the prosecution cannot use the fact of a defendant's poverty as proof of a motive for robbery; he believed the same logic applied here: "The 'burdens' that the State says motivated Lodzinski to kill are the same financial and social challenges facing many single working parents—the struggle to stay in a job, to find daycare, and to maintain a relationship."

==== Petition for rehearing ====
Shortly after the decision, Lodzinksi's lawyers asked the court to invoke a rarely-used rule allowing them to appoint a substitute justice and rehear the case. They argued that the deadlocked Court had violated her due process rights by allowing her conviction to stand under an improper standard of review, and that she was thus entitled to a review by a full Court. Since Rabner had recused himself from anything to do with her case, the chief judge of the Appellate Division, Jose Fuentes, was designated to sit on the Court to hear the motion and the rehearing if necessary.

Again the Court spoke through a per curiam opinion. "Defendant has brought to this Court's attention a failing in its prior handling of this matter, which requires correction. She rightfully claims that the unique procedural posture of this Court's decision left her appeal unconsidered under the proper legal standard, which, left uncorrected, works a violation of her due process rights", it read. "Defendant must be provided her right to be heard on appeal by an appellate body using the correct standard of review." The justices elaborated on their decision in concurring and dissenting opinions, as they had before.

Albin wrote for the same two justices, now a majority as Fuentes had joined them. He primarily responded to arguments made by the same dissenting justices: They had relied on incorrect precedents to argue the rehearing was unnecessary, precedents in which an evenly divided Supreme Court had let an appellate court ruling stand but, while disagreeing as to its correctness, agreed that it was constitutional. Only three of them had upheld the conviction while applying the correct standard, allowing the unconstitutional appellate decision to stand, and since all six justices hearing the case had agreed that the wrong standard of review had been used, any of them could vote on a motion to reconsider the case. Nor was the incorrect ruling the fault of Lodzinski's attorneys citing the wrong precedent in their brief to the Appellate Division; in that circumstance, Albin wrote, the appellate court has a "non-delegable obligation" to maintain constitutional safeguards.

The dissenting justices (Note: Unlike the concurrence, none of them are credited as the author) wrote at length, finding it "astonishing" that Lodzinski had secured a rehearing when the only error they saw in her case had been adequately addressed in the earlier decision, as they had used the proper standard of review and still found the evidence sufficient. "[D]efendant's constitutional rights were fully protected in her appeal, just as they were at her trial", they argued. They insisted that as the only judges who had concurred in actually sustaining her conviction, at least one of them had to have been among the judges granted rehearing. Since none of them were, the order was against the Court's own rules.

Albin had ended his dissent by suggesting the even split in the Court meant its decision might not be final. The dissenters considered that an invitation to petition for rehearing, and with an appellate judge temporarily designated in Rabner's place, "[d]efendant thus achieved a remedy that appears to be unprecedented: the addition of an Appellate Division judge, at the behest of an unsatisfied litigant, for a new hearing before a recomposed Court."

==== Second decision vacating conviction ====
State v. Lodzinski
- Court: Supreme Court of New Jersey
- Full case name: State of New Jersey v. Michelle Lodzinski
- Decided: December 28, 2021
- Citation: A-50-19

Case history
- Prior actions: Conviction upheld, 467 N.J. Super. 447 (N.J.A.D., 2019); affirmed 246 N.J. 331 (N.J., 2021); petition for rehearing granted, 248 N.J. 451 (N.J., 2021)
- Appealed from: New Jersey Superior Court, Appellate Division

Court membership
- Judges sitting: Jaynee LaVecchia, Barry Albin, Anne Patterson, Faustino J. Fernandez-Vina, Lee Solomon, Fabiana Pierre-Louis, José Fuentes (by designation)

Case opinions
- Conviction for first-degree murder must be vacated as unreasonable where state presented no evidence for defendant's state of mind, leaving jury to speculate, even granting other inferences in state's favor. Judgement notwithstanding the verdict granted and conviction vacated
- Decision by: Albin
- Concurrence: LaVecchia, Pierre-Louis, Fuentes
- Dissent: Patterson, Fernandez-Vina, Solomon

Keywords
- Murder; Sufficiency of evidence; Reasonable jury; State of mind

The case was reargued before the Court in October 2021. The decision (Note: Justice LaVecchia's last before retiring) was handed down just before the end of the year. As with the rehearing, Judge Fuentes' vote proved decisive, providing a majority to reverse the appellate court and grant the JNOV on the grounds that the evidence was not sufficient for a reasonable jury to have convicted. Since the JNOV entered an acquittal verdict, Lodzinski's murder conviction was vacated and she cannot be retried for the crime, even if new evidence emerges in the future.

Again writing what was now the majority opinion, Albin reiterated that while he could grant the jury crediting the state's witnesses on the blanket and Wiltsey's possible absence from the carnival over Lodzinski's, and Natarajan's conclusion of homicide, the state still had not proved Lodzinski's state of mind, essential if the conviction was for the most severe charge of murder, as opposed to the lesser included charges of reckless or negligent homicide which it could have convicted on. "Viewing the evidence in the light most favorable to the State, we conclude that no rational jury—without engaging in speculation or conjecture—could conclude that Lodzinski purposely or knowingly caused Timothy's death", Albin wrote.

"The majority does the opposite of what our law requires", complained the dissent. "[It] scours the record for evidence favorable to defendant and draws inferences from that evidence that favor defendant. The majority thus substitutes its own interpretation of the evidence for the conclusion reached by the jury." Specifically, the justices said the majority had failed to credit the jury's possible inference from Wiltsey's body being found near Florida Fulfillment and Lodzinski's initial omission of it from her work history that she had some role in his death as rational. So, too, they argued that in giving credit to Butkiewicz's handling of the blanket having possibly destroyed trace evidence and discounting the blanket testimony by the two former babysitters who identified it as having been in the Lodzinski home prior to trial as tainted by media coverage, the majority had relied on information favorable to the defense rather than deferring to the jury's authority to resolve those issues in favor of the prosecution. It likewise defended other inferences the jury might have drawn as rational ones the justices should not have disturbed.

Lodzinski was released from prison that evening. "When I first broke the news to her this morning, she just said, 'oh my God' and started crying", her attorney, Gerald Krovatin, said. "This was a great day for the rule of law and the principles that matter to us—that convictions have to be based on evidence, and not based on speculation or emotion." Michael Lodzinski, her younger brother, who had come to believe she was guilty, criticized the Court majority: "Justice Albin and his group believe they have righted some great wrong today but all they did was rob justice from a little boy, shame on them." The Middlesex County prosecutor's office declined to comment out of respect for the Court.

== See also ==
- Deaths in 1991
- List of solved missing person cases: 1950–1999
- List of unsolved deaths
