= Siege of Jutland =

The siege of Jutland was the name given to a 1926 altercation between the newly-formed New Jersey State Police and the residents of the Meaney farmhouse in the Jutland section of Union Township, Hunterdon County, New Jersey that led to the death of Beatrice Meaney, the prosecution of 14 State Troopers, and an update to the General Orders of the State Police that paved the way to modern day community policing.

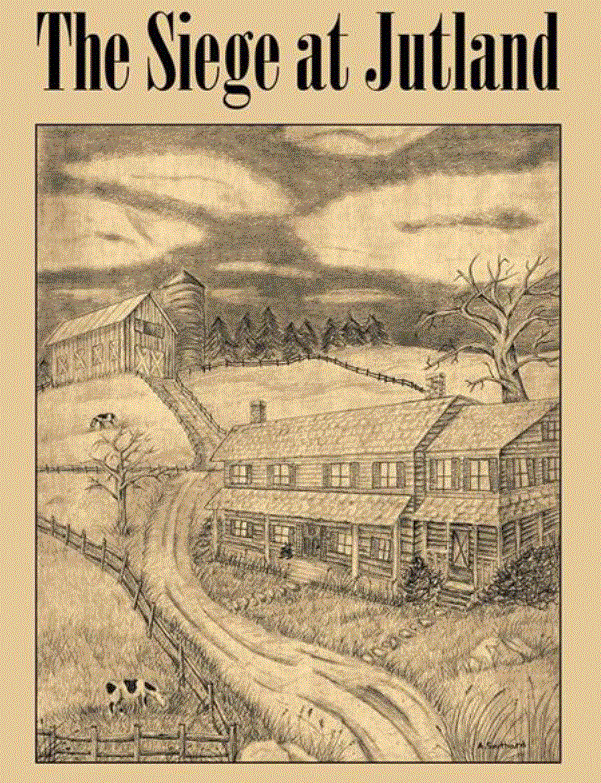

== Accusations of animal cruelty ==
The brothers James and Timothy Meaney lived with their sister Beatrice in a farmhouse in Hunterdon County, New Jersey. A neighbor, Peter Conover, attempted to purchase a few heads of cattle from the brothers but was denied. In response, he contacted the Society for the Prevention of Cruelty to Animals (S.P.C.A.) with an accusation that the Meaney brothers' cattle were malnourished.

On December 24, 1926, two S.P.C.A agents called on Trooper Alfred Larsen to investigate the claim. Larsen knocked on the door of the farm house to say that he had a warrant to view the cattle inside the barn. Beatrice answered only to refuse and tell them to go away. Larsen and the agents proceeded to break into the barn to view the livestock. When they left, they were seen by James Meaney.

According to James, Trooper Larsen and the agents "showed no warrant and did not indicate their authority, if any". Trooper Larsen arrested James and attempted to place him in the S.P.C.A agents' car when the sounds of James' struggle alerted Timothy, who, not knowing the situation, grabbed his shotgun to rescue his brother. Timothy demanded that his brother be released while James pleaded that his brother not fire his weapon. Trooper Larsen released James and appeared to have driven off with the S.P.C.A. agents. The brothers walked back towards the farm house to Beatrice, not knowing that Trooper Larsen had exited the vehicle and lay in wait behind a tree along the road in the dark.

As James walked by the tree, Trooper Larsen called out "HALT" without announcing himself as an officer. As James began to flee, Trooper Larsen shot him in the back of his left knee. Larsen then fled the scene while James returned to the farmhouse with the help of his brother and sister.

== The Siege of Jutland ==
As the Meaneys tended to James' wound, Larsen went back to Jutland to enlist the help of other three other State Troopers. They returned around 10pm that night when, without warning, Lieutenant Daniel Rogers ordered an open fire on the farmhouse. A return of shotgun fire went out towards the Troopers at which point additional help was organized. In a matter of hours, 35 NJ State Troopers has surrounded the farm house (approximately 20% of the entire state police force at the time).

Unable to get close enough to the farmhouse to use teargas, "Lieutenant Rogers wrote that 'a barrage was laid down to offer protection to the men placing the gas". Over 100 rounds of gun and rifle fire were discharged at the farmhouse before Troopers were able to storm the home, using a log as a battering ram. There they found Timothy Meaney with a shotgun, James with his wounded knee, and Beatrice, who had been hiding in a kitchen pantry, struck in the abdomen and bleeding to death.

"At no time during the siege had they [the Meaneys] seen a uniformed man". Timothy was beaten by Troopers prior to his arrest while James and Beatrice were taken away in an ambulance. Beatrice died in the hospital.

== New York Times coverage: "The Curious Visit Scene of Fatal Farm Raid" ==
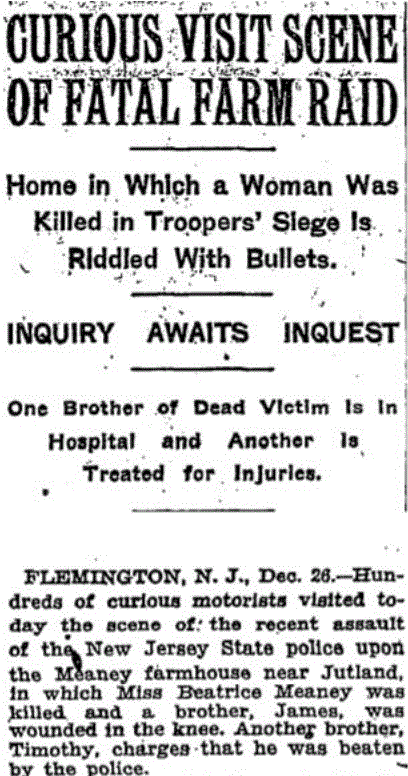
New York Times initial report of the Incident

Colonel Norman Schwarzkopf Sr., the commander of the NJ State Troopers, was presented a report from Lieutenant Rogers that "led Schwarzkopf to believe that the farmers 'were defending their home for some serious purpose'" and therefore expressed support for his officers.

Meanwhile, The New York Times reported on the incident the next day and cited that a petition had been started by Hunterdon County farmers demanding that New Jersey's Governor Moore order an investigation.

== The investigation and grand jury ==
A grand jury determined that fourteen Troopers and the S.P.C.A agents were to stand trial in Flemington, New Jersey. Judge Robbins addressed the jury to make the determination of whether or not an unnecessary amount of force was used during the siege. The prosecution presented its case and both Trooper Larsen and Lieutenant Rogers were convicted of Manslaughter in the death of Beatrice Meaney.

== The legacy ==
The New York Times reported after the conviction that "the lesson thus taught the State Police it will be more servicable and the rights of the people it is sworn to protect will in future be one of its first considerations".

Colonel Schwarzkopf amended two of the general orders of the State Troopers following the events at the Meaney Farm.

In response to Timothy Meaney's beating, Schwarzkopf revised General Order #18 concerning the treatment of prisoners to declare that "the striking, mutilation or ill-treatment of Prisoners in the State Police is absolutely forbidden, and violations of this order will be drastically dealt with".

According to historian Mark Falzini, these revisions "showed the public – and the legislature – that the Department of State Police was capable of evolving and improving itself to better serve the citizens of the State".

In response to Timothy Meaney's accusation that police stole from his property following the arrest, General Order #9 was revised to require that "All Members of this department are instructed that when a Prisoner is searched at the scene of a crime or immediately upon his arrest, precautions will be taken to have proper witnesses present and all articles taken from him will be noted immediately and he will be given a receipt in full, showing thereon the articles taken. The property will then be turned over to the Area Commander for disposal to the County Prosecutor or his Representative".
