= Kathleen Dorsett =

American murderer

- Born: July 2, 1974 (age 52)
- Occupation: Teacher
- Employer: Ocean Township Board of Education
- Spouse: Stephen Moore (m. 2007; div. 2010) (victim)
- Children: 1
- Status: Imprisoned
- Motive: Child custody battle
- Convictions: Murder (30 years); Attempted murder (20 years); Conspiracy (8 years)
- Penalty: 58 years in prison
- Accomplices: Thomas Dorsett (father; convicted and sentenced to 45 years in prison for murder, attempted murder, and conspiracy); Lesley Dorsett (mother; convicted and sentenced to 7 years in prison for conspiracy to commit murder); Anthony Morris (acquaintance; convicted and sentenced to 7 years in prison for desecration of human remains)

Details
- Imprisoned at: Edna Mahan Correctional Facility for Women

Kathleen Dorsett (born July 2, 1974) is a former Neptune, New Jersey schoolteacher who was convicted of the August 2010 murder of her ex-husband, Stephen Moore, in May 2013. Her father, Thomas Dorsett, also pleaded guilty to the murder, and her mother, Lesley Dorsett, a former member of the Ocean Township Board of Education, pleaded guilty to conspiracy to commit murder in 2013. The case made headlines across New Jersey and throughout the United States.

== Background ==
Kathleen Dorsett, a kindergarten and third grade teacher at the Gables School in Neptune Township, New Jersey, and Stephen Moore, a salesman at a local Honda dealership, and former speed skater, married in June 2007. The following year, Kathleen gave birth to the couple's only daughter, Elizabeth. Shortly after though, the couple began disagreeing about how to best care for their daughter. Eventually the couple began divorce proceedings and a custody battle ensued. The divorce was later finalized in June 2010, with Kathleen receiving primary physical custody.

After the divorce, Kathleen's parents, Thomas and Lesley Dorsett, planned to move to Florida with their daughter Kathleen and her daughter. However, the couple would have had to help Stephen Moore move there too, so he could have access to their daughter. This would require Thomas Dorsett providing financial assistance to Moore for the first six months following the move.

== Murder ==
On August 16, 2010, Stephen Moore was dropping off his daughter at Kathleen's parents’ home in Oakhurst, New Jersey. Following the exchange, Stephen was beaten to death by Kathleen's father, Thomas Dorsett, in the driveway of their home, while Kathleen was allegedly changing the child's diaper. Later that day, when he failed to show up to work at the Honda dealership, Stephen was reported as a missing person by his employer. Two days later, on August 18, 2010, Stephen's body was found in the back of his mother's burning 2001 Nissan Altima in Long Branch, New Jersey.

== Investigation ==
Shortly after the murder on August 23, Kathleen Dorsett was arrested and charged with one count of first-degree murder and one count of fourth-degree tampering with evidence. Following his daughter's arrest, Thomas Dorsett attempted suicide by ingesting refrigerant outside his attorney's office. He survived and was charged with one count of first-degree murder, two counts of fourth-degree tampering with evidence, and one count of third-degree witness tampering. Another man, Anthony Morris, was charged with arson and desecration of human remains; he had allegedly been paid $3,000 by Thomas Dorsett to burn Stephen Moore's mother's car with his body in the trunk. Kathleen and Thomas Dorsett were held at the Monmouth County jail on $1.5 million and $2.5 million cash bail, respectively.

While in jail awaiting trial, Kathleen Dorsett and her mother Lesley were charged with conspiracy to commit murder and attempted murder for attempting to arrange and solicit a hit man to kill Stephen Moore's mother, Evlyn, who received custody of his daughter after Kathleen's arrest. During this investigation, it was also discovered that the Dorsett family was involved in money laundering, as they had attempted to conceal $96,000 worth of assets. In November 2010, all three Dorsetts were charged with money laundering.

== Convictions ==
In April 2011, Anthony Morris pled guilty to conspiracy to disturb or desecrate human remains. Under his plea agreement, he was sentenced to less than seven years in prison.

In May 2013, Kathleen, Thomas, and Lesley Dorsett pled guilty to all charges against them.

Kathleen Dorsett was sentenced to 30 years in prison for murder, 20 years for attempted murder, and 8 years for conspiracy. She is serving her sentences, running consecutively, at the Edna Mahan Correctional Facility for Women in Union Township, New Jersey. She is eligible for parole in August 2057, when she will be 83 years old. Since her incarceration, the New Jersey Department of Education has stripped Kathleen of her teaching certificates.

Thomas Dorsett was sentenced to 30 years for murder and 15 years for conspiracy to commit arson. He is serving his sentences at the New Jersey State Prison in Trenton, New Jersey. He will be eligible for parole in August 2040, he will be 93 years old.

Lesley Dorsett was sentenced to 7 years for conspiracy to commit murder. Like her daughter, she was incarcerated at the Edna Mahan Correctional Facility for Women. She became eligible for parole in December 2016 and has now been released.

Evlyn Moore, Stephen Moore's mother, had custody of Stephen and Kathleen's daughter, Elizabeth, until 2021 when she died at the age of 86. Elizabeth continues to live with other family members.

== In the media ==
Stephen Moore's murder was featured on Dateline NBC in April 2015 and the Oxygen channel's series Snapped in August 2015.

It was also featured on Dateline NBC on May 1, 2021 episode named Family Affair
