= Edna Mahan Correctional Facility for Women =

Women's prison in New Jersey, United States

Coordinates: 40°37′45″N 74°56′04″W

- Interactive map of Edna Mahan Correctional Facility for Women
- Location: 30 Route 513 Union Township, Hunterdon County, New Jersey Clinton address
- Status: Open
- Security class: Mixed
- Capacity: 709
- Opened: 1913
- Managed by: New Jersey Department of Corrections

Edna Mahan Correctional Facility for Women (formerly the Clinton Correctional Facility for Women) is an American prison facility for women of the state of New Jersey Department of Corrections, located in Union Township, Hunterdon County, New Jersey, near Clinton. Its official abbreviation is EMCFW. The facility was named for Edna Mahan (b. 1900, pronounced Mann), one of the first female correctional superintendents in the U.S.

The current administrator is William Hauck; he has served in that position for four years. As of February 2009, the prison held 950 inmates in maximum, medium, and minimum security sections. As of June 2021, the prison housed 378 inmates. According to the New Jersey Department of Corrections, Edna Mahan "provides custody and treatment programs for female offenders ages 16 and older. The facility features the Puppies Behind Bars program, in which inmates train guide dogs for the blind, among other unique ventures. EMCFW has a drug and alcohol treatment unit as well as Bureau of State Use Industries shops specializing in clothing and tele-response/data entry."

== History ==
Before the facility opened, female offenders in New Jersey were held in their own wing at Trenton State Prison. In 1911, the New Jersey Legislature approved the usage of funds to purchase a 400-acre farm outside of the town of Clinton for use as a reformatory solely for women. The new facility would open two years later, in 1913, as the New Jersey State Reformatory for Women, also known as Clinton Farms. The property originally contained three farmhouses, barns and other outbuildings, with security enhancements such as window girllings and locks being made to the farmhouses in order to accommodate inmates.

In 1928, Edna Mahan became superintendent of Clinton Farms, becoming one of the first women in the country to lead a prison. Mahan, a staunch reformer, oversaw numerous changes to the structure of how the prison ran. The facility had minimal security barriers. There was no security fencing that enclosed the property, and Mahan ordered the removal of bars from buildings. In addition, a number of privileges were offered to well-behaved inmates, such as the ability to free-roam the property as well as day parole. Entertainment options were also provided. During this time, Edna Mahan also oversaw the integration of black and white prisoners into the same accommodations.

During Mahan's tenure as superintendent the facility continued to expand. In 1962, the Center Building was refitted into a maximum-security unit after a group of four women broke into the building and vandalized numerous fixtures. Two years later, a bond referendum was approved by voters which provided funds for the construction of six new buildings, including an entirely new maximum-security building. Edna Mahan served as superintendent until her death in 1968, and was buried on the property. The Clinton Correctional Facility for Women was renamed in honor of her in 1987 by the New Jersey General Assembly.

1979 escape of Assata Shakur

The prison came under national attention when, on November 2, 1979, Assata Shakur, a member of the Black Liberation Army, escaped from the facility aided by three of her fellow members. She had been serving a life sentence for the murder of New Jersey State Trooper Werner Foerster during a traffic stop along the New Jersey Turnpike. During the escape, a prison van was stolen and two officers were taken hostage, but were released unharmed in the parking lot of the adjacent Hunterdon State School for the Retarded, where getaway cars were parked. Charged with assisting in her escape were Mutulu Shakur (no relation) and Silvia Baraldini. In part for his role in the event, Mutulu was named as the 380th addition to the FBI's list of Most Wanted Fugitives on July 23, 1982; he was captured in 1986.

In 2013, Assata Shakur was placed on the FBI's list of Most Wanted Terrorists. She died in 2025 while living in Cuba under political asylum.

== Sexual misconduct allegations ==
In April 2020, the United States Department of Justice released a report which cited the "open secret" of sexual misconduct in the prison.

=== Incidents ===
In 1994, Kevin Brodie was fired and prosecuted for having a sexual relationship with an inmate/parolee.

In 1995, William Jimenez stayed in a hotel with an inmate during a leave of absence. He was later fired and prosecuted.

In the summer of 1998, David Clappison entered a guilty plea to sexual assault after admitting to having had sexual relations with an inmate.

Robert Scannicchio was fired for vacationing with a former inmate in 1998. It was also reported that they became “unduly familiar” with each other while she was incarcerated.

In the spring of 1998, Jeffrey Barr was fired and prosecuted for having sexual contact with an inmate.

Stewart Sella was accused of sexually assaulting Jacqueline Haggenmiller and Tammy Davis ten times between 1997 and 1999. In 1998, Haggenmiller reported rapes and sexual assaults against her by Sella. After a formal investigation, Sella was fired and charged in 2000.

Tammy Davis initially reported her allegations against Sella to Regina Dozier, almost two years prior to Haggenmiller's reports. Dozier was later investigated and fired for covering up Davis’ allegations. Dozier was also charged with official misconduct and improper sexual contact after she allegedly had sexual contact with four inmates at the prison.

Ralph Grier was sentenced to five years in prison for taking photos of an inmate while she was “flashing” the camera. It was verbally agreed upon before the taking of the photos between Grier and the inmate that she would receive $150 and a transfer to a new cell. Instead of this, she received $30 and no transfer. Before the incident, Grier would often give the inmate cigarettes, candy, gum, and, on one occasion, a pair of earrings.

In 2008, James Gallichio was charged with second-degree misconduct and sexual assault after an unidentified inmate came forwarded and told investigators that they had a “mutual sexual relationship” while she was incarcerated, according to a probable cause affidavit. Gallichio smuggled a phone into the facility for the inmate and, between November 2007 and March 2008, the two spoke on the phone 894 times. Since most of the phone calls were made over a recorded line, it was easy for investigators to discover their professed love for each other. Also, it was stated that Gallichio smuggled in the “wand”, code for pregnancy test, to the inmate, and that “tells you something”, according to court papers. Gallichio is currently serving a 12-year sentence for armed robbery.

On October 31, 2016, Joel Herscap entered a guilty plea for the following charges: two counts of second-degree official misconduct, two counts of second-degree sexual assault, and one count of fourth-degree criminal sexual contact. It was reported that he was trading tobacco products in exchange for sex.

Jason Mays was arrested in September 2016 and was later found guilty of sexual assault, criminal sexual contact, as well as official misconduct. One of the inmates with whom Mays performed intercourse testified during his trial. She said she only did it because her parole date was coming up and didn't want another infraction. She also stated “It was an officer versus an inmate… they could take my release date away from me in a blink of an eye.”

Ahnwar Dixon was arrested on November 19, 2016, and was later indicted on one count of second-degree sexual assault, three counts of second-degree official misconduct, five counts of fourth-degree criminal sexual conduct, and one count of second-degree pattern of official misconduct.

Brian Ambroise was arrested in October 2016 and is set to face charges of sexual assault and official misconduct. It was reported that Ambroise engaged in a “pattern” of official misconduct.

Thomas Seguine was arrested on February 19, 2017, and sentenced on May 1, 2017. He pleaded guilty to official misconduct after authorities accused him of having sex with an inmate. He was sentenced to three years in prison.

Joel Mercado was indicted on August 17, 2017, on two counts of official misconduct and two counts of sexual assault. It was reported that Mercado had sexual relationships with two separate inmates.

On February 2, 2018, Ronald Coleman Jr. was arrested and charged with seven counts of official misconduct, two counts of sexual assault, two counts of conspiracy to commit sexual assault, one count of pattern of official misconduct, and three counts of criminal sexual conduct.

Erick Melgar had sexual assault allegations against him by six different inmates. Melgar was fired from his job as a correctional officer in 2010. On March 22, 2017, Melgar reportedly paid the six inmates $75,000. Melgar was never officially charged with a crime. The head of the Edna Mahan during the time of the internal investigation stated that Melgar should have been criminally charged.

A 2020 report by the Justice Department mentioned that sexual abuse had been rampant at the facility for decades. In mid-2020, press reports indicated that some inmates were forced to trade sex for toilet paper.

In 2021, 31 correctional staff members were suspended.

As a result of the numerous incidents and allegations, the governor of New Jersey announced that the prison would be closed.

== In popular culture ==
The facility played host to The Rolling Thunder Revue Tour on December 7, 1975, headed by Bob Dylan.

The 2004 documentary Freedom Road by Lorna A. Johnson, depicting the lives of three inmates, was filmed at Edna Mahan. Another documentary, Going Home, was also shot at Edna Mahan and was based on Steven Kalafer's observation of the Life Skills Academy program.

== Notable inmates ==
| Inmate Name | Register Number | Status | Details |
|---|---|---|---|
| Kathleen Dorsett | 000553258E | Eligible for parole in 2057. | Convicted in the 2010 murder of her ex-husband, Stephen Moore. |
| Amy Locane | 000637627C | Paroled December 20, 2024. | Convicted of 2010 vehicular homicide and assault by auto. |
| Michelle Lodzinski | 000306520C | Released December 28, 2021. | Convicted of the 1991 murder of her five-year-old son, which was later vacated. |
| Melanie McGuire | 000319833C | Currently serving life without parole. | Convicted of the 2004 murder of her husband. |
| Assata Shakur | 000335640A | Escaped in 1979. | Convicted of the 1973 murder of a New Jersey State Trooper. |
| Leslie Nelson | 000403427B | Currently serving life; eligible for parole February 24, 2048 | Convicted of the murder of two police officers. |
| Diane Downs | 000443335B | Transferred to Central California Women's Facility, where she is serving a life sentence plus 50 years. | Convicted of the 1983 murder of her daughter and attempted murder of her other children. |
