= Melanie McGuire =

American murderer (born 1972)

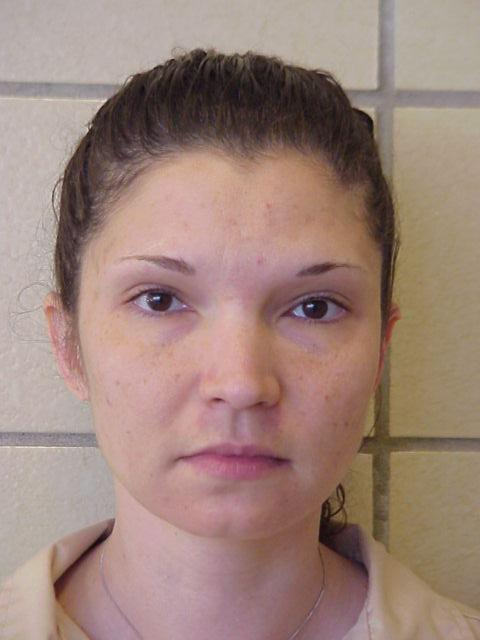
- McGuire in 2022
- Born: Melanie Lyn Slate; October 8, 1972 (age 54); Ridgewood, New Jersey, U.S.
- Other name: Suitcase Murderer
- Occupation: Former nurse
- Height: 5 ft 3 in (160 cm)
- Spouse: William "Bill" McGuire (m. 1999; murdered 2004)
- Status: Imprisoned
- Convictions: First-degree murder; Possession of a weapon for an unlawful purpose; Desecrating human remains; Perjury
- Penalty: Life imprisonment with the possibility of parole after 66 years, plus 5 years

Details
- Victims: William "Bill“ McGuire
- Date: April 28, 2004
- Weapons: .38 caliber handgun, electric saw
- Date apprehended: June 2, 2005
- Imprisoned at: Edna Mahan Correctional Facility for Women; Clinton, New Jersey, U.S.

Melanie Lyn McGuire (née Slate; born October 8, 1972) is an American former nurse who was convicted of the murder of her husband. He was murdered on April 28, 2004, in what media dubbed the "Suitcase Murder". She was sentenced to life in prison, on July 19, 2007 and is serving her sentence at the Edna Mahan Correctional Facility for Women in Clinton, New Jersey. She will not be eligible for parole until she is 101 years old.

== Early life and education ==
Melanie Lyn Slate grew up in Ridgewood and Middletown Township, New Jersey, attending Middletown High School South. She enrolled at Rutgers University, with a double major in math and psychology, and graduated in 1994. She graduated second in her class from the Charles E. Gregory School of Nursing (now Raritan Bay Medical Center) in 1997 with a nursing diploma. She married United States Navy veteran William T. "Bill" McGuire (born September 21, 1964) in 1999.

== Murder ==
By April 2004, the McGuires had been married for five years. Melanie was a nurse at a fertility clinic, and Bill was a computer programmer. The couple had two sons and lived in a Woodbridge Township, New Jersey apartment but planned to move that month to a larger home in Warren County. They closed the documents on their new house on April 28 but never moved in. That night, according to the prosecution, McGuire drugged her husband, shot him to death with a .38 caliber revolver, and subsequently dismembered his body. She put his remains into 3 suitcases. Those three suitcases were later found in the Chesapeake Bay.

== Investigation ==
On May 5, 2004, the first suitcase, containing human legs was found floating near the Chesapeake Bay Bridge–Tunnel's fourth artificial island by two fishermen and two children, and a murder investigation was launched. On May 11, a second larger suitcase was found on the beach of Fisherman Island National Wildlife Refuge by a graduate student cleaning up litter. That suitcase contained a head and a torso. The head had one bullet wound and the torso had two bullet wounds to the chest. The third and smallest suitcase, containing arms, was recovered floating in the water near the Chesapeake Bay Bridge–Tunnel's second artificial island, on May 16. Police released a facial reconstruction sketch of the victim that an acquaintance of Bill McGuire's recognized. Melanie then became the prime suspect, and authorities turned the investigation over to the New Jersey State Police.

During the investigation, incriminating evidence against Melanie was uncovered. On April 26, 2004, Melanie had purchased a .38 caliber handgun from a store in Easton, Pennsylvania. Bill had been killed with a .38 caliber handgun with wadcutter cartridges. Melanie's receipt for the gun also listed an unspecified purchase of $9.95. There were only two items in the store for that amount, and one of them was a box of wadcutter cartridges. Police received a tip from a private towing company employee who said he towed a 2002 Nissan Maxima (Bill McGuire's car) from the Flamingo Motel in Atlantic City on May 8, 2004. Upon further investigation, police discovered a security video of the car being moved in the early morning hours of April 30, 2004. The footage was blurry and the police weren't able to identify the person in the video. Melanie later claimed she had moved the car as a "prank", even though she had applied for a protection from abuse order days earlier after allegedly being slapped by her husband. Police also learned that Melanie had been having a long-term affair with a co-worker named Bradley Miller. Her E-ZPass tag was recorded at a toll booth in Delaware two days after the murder. She claimed that this was the result of her going furniture shopping in Delaware because the state has no sales tax. Before she was charged with murder, Melanie contacted E-ZPass and attempted to have the $0.90 charge removed from her account history. Days later, an unidentified man, believed by many to be her stepfather, also contacted E-ZPass and attempted to have the charge removed.

The plastic bags that contained Bill's body parts and the bags that contained Bill's clothes, which Melanie had given away to a friend, were demonstrated by forensics to have been manufactured on the same assembly line within hours of one another. Melanie admitted that the couple owned the same set of luggage that the body was found in, a matching three-piece set of Kenneth Cole suitcases. Green fibers had been found on one of the bullets lodged in Bill's chest. The fibers were identified as polyester fill, a common material found in household furniture. Bill and Melanie owned a green couch and investigators theorized that the murderer used a pillow or couch cushion as a makeshift silencer when Bill was shot. Similarly, a medical grade towel, found with Bill's body, matched those stocked at the clinic where Melanie worked. A witness testified that Melanie used the same towels to protect furniture when they moved into their home.

== Trial ==
On June 2, 2005, more than a year after the murder, Melanie dropped her children off at child care and preschool. After exiting the older child's school, Melanie started walking toward her vehicle when law enforcement emerged from the bushes. She was taken into custody without incident. She was immediately booked into the Middlesex County Adult Correctional Center on first-degree murder charges but made her bail of US$750,000 (equivalent to $1.2 million in 2025). Through her attorneys, Joe Tacopina, Steve Turano, and Marc Ward, she pleaded not guilty to the charges.

After being released on bail, Melanie faced additional charges, on October 11, 2005. A four-count indictment came down from a state grand jury. Her bail was raised to $2.1 million (equivalent to $3.5 million in 2025), but she was again released. More than a year later, on October 26, 2006, McGuire was charged with two counts of hindering apprehension, for allegedly writing letters to police aimed at getting them off her trail. She again pleaded not guilty and was released after posting $10,000 bail (equivalent to $16,000 in 2025).

Almost three years after the crime, McGuire's murder trial commenced at the Middlesex County Courthouse in New Brunswick, New Jersey, on March 5, 2007. Prosecutors contended that her motive for murder was to start a new life with her lover. McGuire persisted in claiming that she was innocent. She claimed her husband had become increasingly moody and unpredictable and was a compulsive gambler.

On April 23, 2007, McGuire's murder trial jury found her guilty of first-degree murder, finding that the evidence established her culpability for the murder beyond a reasonable doubt. She was also convicted of the lesser charges of perjury, desecration of human remains and possession of a weapon for an unlawful purpose. The jury acquitted McGuire of the two counts of hindering prosecution, as well as tampering with evidence and possession of alprazolam without a prescription.

Shortly after her conviction, but before sentencing, McGuire appealed for a new trial, on the basis of the story of jailhouse informant Christopher Thieme that her husband was deeply in debt and may have been killed by Atlantic City mobsters. Prosecutors established that the informant was "entirely incredible and routinely and habitually fabricates stories", according to a New Jersey State Police investigation, before the informant recanted and accused McGuire's attorney of suborning perjury. With the story debunked, the request for a new trial was withdrawn. On July 19, 2007, at the age of 34, McGuire was sentenced to life in prison.

== Aftermath ==
During her arraignment on murder charges, McGuire's case was dubbed the "Suitcase Murder" by various media outlets. Author John Glatt wrote a book about the case, titled To Have and To Kill. The case has been profiled on television outlets: Snapped Oxygen Network; Dateline NBC; 48 Hours Mystery CBS; and The Investigators TruTV; Deadly Affairs Investigation Discovery and Forensic Files II, among other true crime television shows.

McGuire's conviction was affirmed by an appeals court on March 16, 2011. The three-judge panel affirmed that McGuire must serve more than 63 years in prison before she is eligible for parole. On September 20, 2011, the New Jersey Supreme Court declined to hear her further appeal. On April 29, 2014, McGuire filed a motion for post-conviction relief, alleging ineffective assistance of counsel and newly discovered evidence.

On September 25, 2014, McGuire appeared in court with her new attorney, Lois DeJulio, a public defender, to try to get a hearing that could overturn her 2007 murder conviction on the grounds that her previous legal representation by Joe Tacopina was inadequate or ineffective. The request was subsequently denied.

== Adaptation ==
In 2022, Lifetime produced a movie called Suitcase Killer: The Melanie McGuire Story, as part of its "Ripped from the Headlines" series of movies for television. The film stars Candice King as Melanie McGuire, Michael Roark as William McGuire, Jackson Hurst as Bradley Miller and Wendie Malick as Patricia Prezioso.

== See also ==
- Murder of Jorge Torres – known as the suitcase murder trial, in which a man died after being zipped into a suitcase
