= Murder of Jorge Torres =

2020 murder in Winter Park, Florida

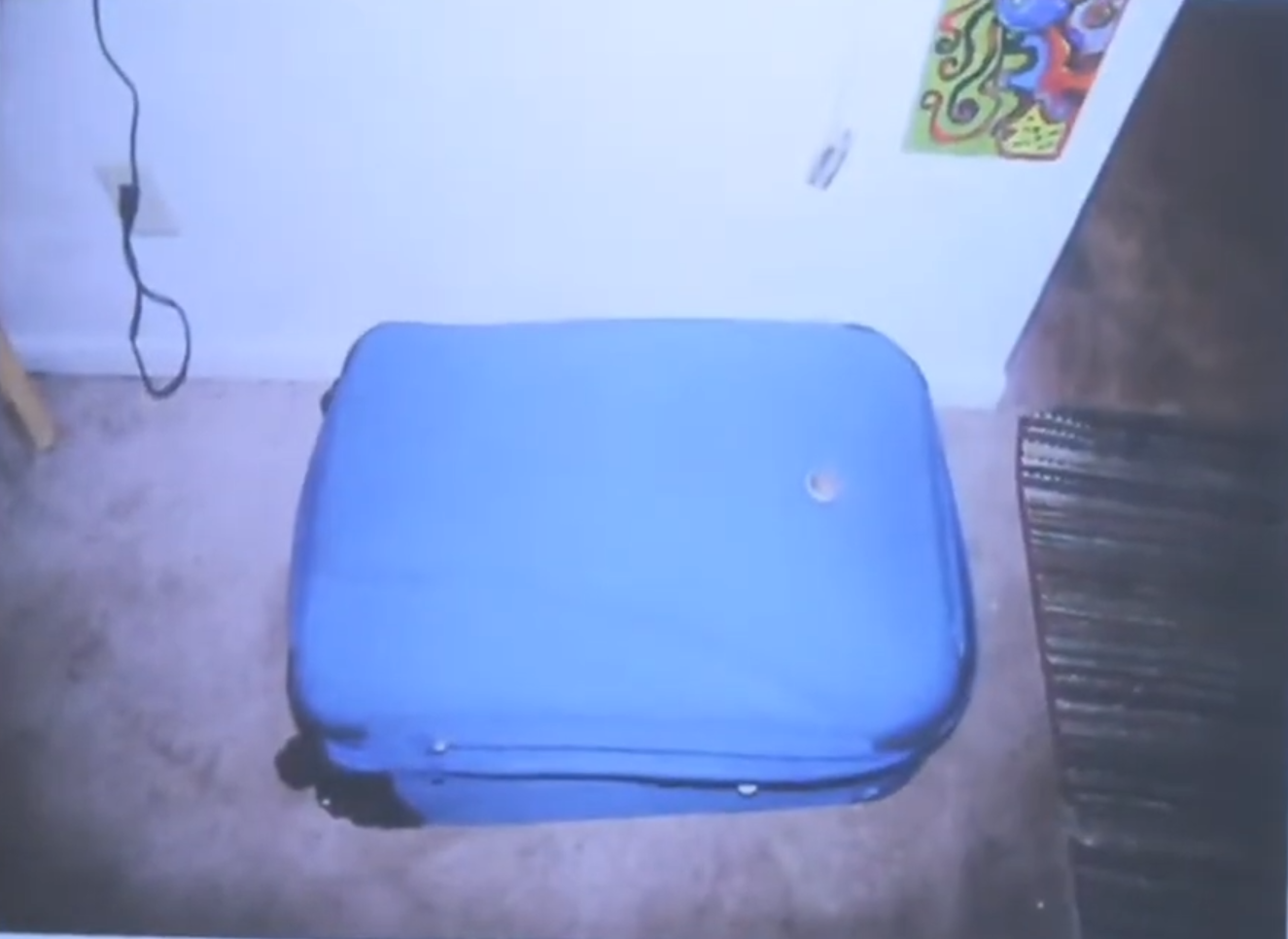
- The suitcase used in the killing
- Location: 28.6080°N 81.2872°W; Winter Park, Florida, U.S.
- Date: February 23, 2020; 6 years ago c. 11:00 p.m. (Note: Torres was pronounced dead on February 24) (EST)
- Attack type: Murder by suffocation, mariticide
- Weapon: Suitcase
- Victim: Jorge Torres Jr. (age 42)
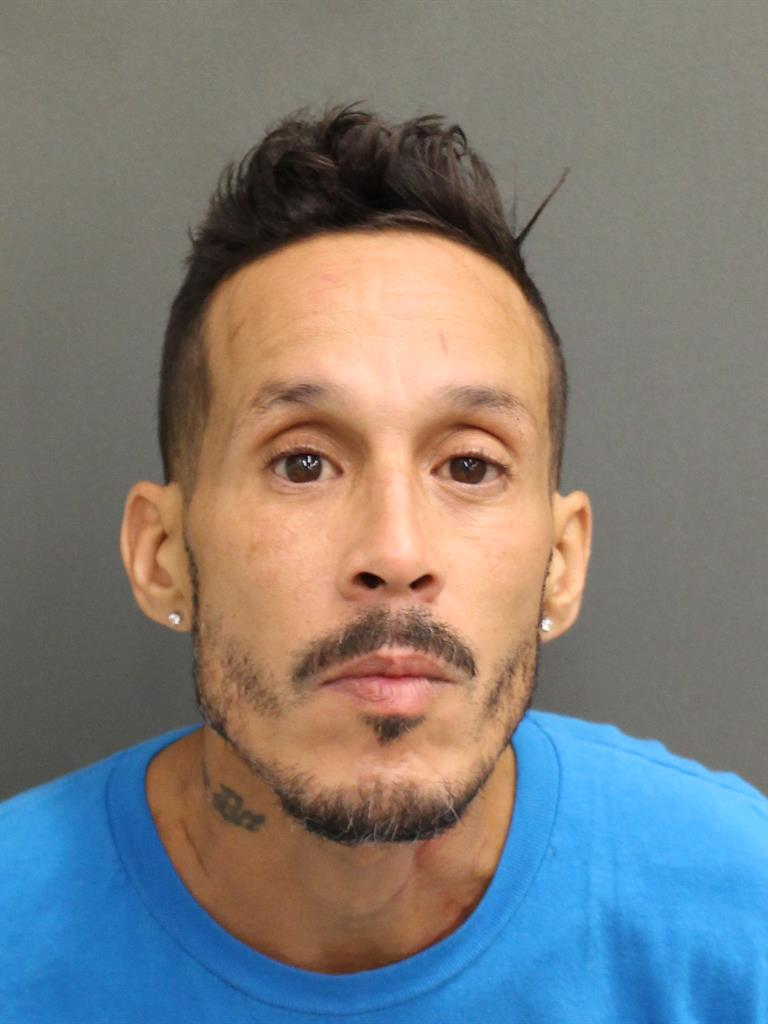
- Torres in 2018
- Perpetrator: Sarah Boone
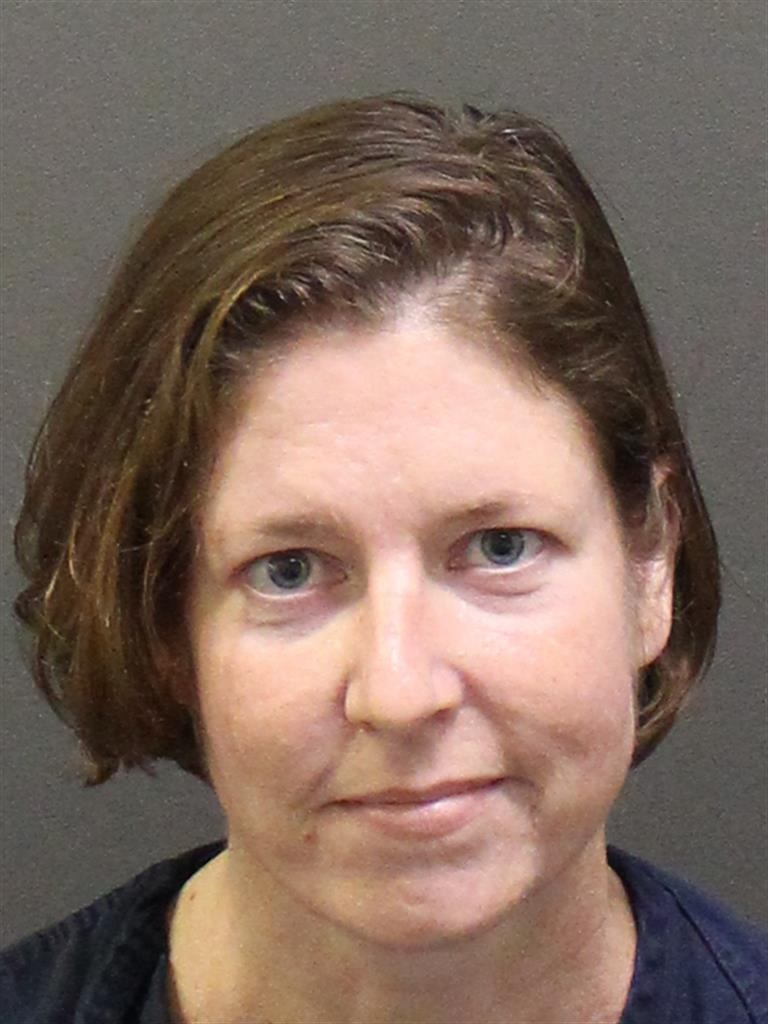
- Mugshot of Boone in 2020
- Convictions: Second-degree murder
- Sentence: Life imprisonment without the possibility of parole

Jorge Torres Jr., a 42-year-old American man, suffocated to death in Winter Park, Florida after being zipped into a suitcase on February 23, 2020, by his girlfriend, then-42-year-old Sarah Boone. Boone was arrested for second-degree murder after police discovered videos on her phone of her interacting with Torres while he was in the suitcase. She was convicted on October 25, 2024, and subsequently sentenced to life in prison.

Boone's legal proceedings drew attention in part from her written correspondence with the judge and a number of defense lawyers withdrawing from the case. Media referred to the case as the suitcase murder trial.

== Background ==
Torres had been arrested multiple times for alleged instances of domestic violence against Boone and she had been arrested once before for an alleged instance of domestic violence against Torres. Boone had been arrested once for battery by strangulation against Torres in July 2018 when both Boone and Torres were arrested; however, her charge in that case was dismissed. Torres had been arrested four times for alleged battery against Boone; Boone bailed Torres out of jail each time.

== Incident and investigation ==
On February 24, 2020, Boone called 9-1-1 and told them that her boyfriend, Jorge Torres, was dead. Boone stated that she and Torres had a single bottle of wine and then decided to play hide-and-seek. She said that they thought it would be funny to put him in the suitcase, and that they were both laughing. She stated that she then went upstairs and accidentally fell asleep, leaving Torres in the suitcase. Boone later admitted to striking Torres with a baseball bat while he was in the suitcase.

During the on-site investigation, Boone willingly turned over her phone to forensic investigators. A search of the phone found two videos that Boone had taken the night before. The videos showed Boone laughing as Torres pleaded for help inside the suitcase, with Boone stating, "That's what you do when you choke me" and "That's what I feel like when you cheat on me". Boone was interviewed by detectives at the police department the following day. Boone stated that she did not remember recording the videos. Torres's death was ruled a homicide.

== Trial of Sarah Boone ==
Boone was charged with second-degree murder for killing Torres and held in Orange County jail without bail. Eight different attorneys who represented her withdrew, seven of them having been court-appointed. Judge Michael Kraynick ruled that Boone had forfeited her right to court-appointed counsel. On July 18, 2024, at a hearing where Boone was representing herself, she submitted a letter which included a hand-drawn advertisement for a lawyer. The advertisement was circulated by media reporting on the filing, and Boone found representation by attorney James Owens. Owens met with state prosecutors about a possible plea agreement to the charge of manslaughter in exchange for a 15-year sentence, which Boone ultimately rejected.

After multiple delays, including the COVID-19 pandemic and Hurricane Milton, the trial began on October 14, 2024. A jury of six with eight alternates was sworn in, and on October 18, 2024, Assistant State Attorney William Jay began opening arguments. The defense argued that Boone suffered from battered woman syndrome. Prosecutor Jay argued that "This defendant zipped Jorge Torres shut in a suitcase. She was able to do this because at the time of his death, he weighed 103 pounds. She did this with a malicious intent to punish him and then she went up to sleep and left him to take his final breaths on this Earth alone". Closing arguments were on October 25, 2024, and on the same day after less than two hours of deliberation, the jury returned a guilty verdict for second-degree murder. On December 2, 2024, Boone was sentenced to life in the Florida Department of Corrections.

=== Reactions ===
Boone was reportedly "shocked" by the verdict. Court TV listed Boone as one of the ten most controversial defendants of 2024. Content creators commented on Boone's decision to reject the plea deal, noting that she may have been eligible for parole after only four more years.

=== Appeal ===
Boone obtained her thirteenth lawyer after multiple appellate attorneys withdrew from her case.

== See also ==
- Melanie McGuire – also known as the suitcase murderer
