= Helen E. Hoens =

American judge (born 1954)

Associate Justice of the Supreme Court of New Jersey
- In office October 26, 2006 – October 26, 2013
- Nominated by: Jon Corzine
- Succeeded by: Faustino J. Fernandez-Vina

Judge of the New Jersey Superior Court
- In office 1994–2001
- Appointed by: Christine Todd Whitman
- In office 2001–2002
- Appointed by: Donald DiFrancesco

The New Jersey Superior Court, Appellate Division
- In office 2002–2006
- Appointed by: Deborah Poritz

Personal details
- Born: July 31, 1954 (age 72) Elizabeth, New Jersey, U.S.
- Party: Republican
- Spouse: Robert W. Schwaneberg
- Children: Charles
- Education: College of William & Mary (BA in Government); Georgetown University Law Center (JD)
- Profession: Lawyer
- Salary: $185,482 (4th qrt 2012)

Helen E. Hoens (born July 31, 1954) is a former Associate Justice of the New Jersey Supreme Court. She was nominated to the Supreme Court by Governor Jon Corzine on September 21, 2006. She was confirmed by the New Jersey Senate on October 23 and sworn into office on October 26, 2006. October 26, 2013 was her last day as a sitting member of the court.

== Biography ==
Born in Elizabeth, New Jersey, on July 31, 1954, Hoens graduated in 1972 from Columbia High School in Maplewood and was inducted into the school's hall of fame in 2010. She holds a B.A. in government from the College of William and Mary, graduating with high honors, and a J.D. from Georgetown University Law Center. While at Georgetown, she served on the Georgetown Law Journal, first as a member of the staff and then as the editor of the journal’s annual volume devoted to developments in criminal procedure in the federal circuit courts.

== Career ==
Upon graduation, she served as a law clerk to Judge John Joseph Gibbons during his service on the United States Court of Appeals for the Third Circuit before embarking on a career in private practice.

After her clerkship, Hoens worked in private practice, first at Dewey Ballantine and with the Law Office of Russel H. Beatie, Jr. in New York. She moved to New Jersey to practice with Pitney, Harden and later with Lum, Hoens, Conant Danzis & Kleinberg, where her father, Charles H. Hoens Jr., was a founding partner.

Hoens was appointed to the Superior Court in 1994 by Governor Christine Todd Whitman, and reappointed by Governor Donald DiFrancesco in 2001. She was elevated to the Appellate Division in August, 2002 by Chief Justice Deborah T. Poritz.

In 2006 she was appointed to fill the anticipated vacancy on the Supreme Court left by the elevation of Associate Justice James R. Zazzali to replace Poritz as chief justice.

On August 12, 2013, Governor Chris Christie announced that he would not renominate Hoens for lifetime appointment to the state's Supreme Court. She is the second justice of the Supreme Court to be denied tenure in more than 66 years since the adoption of the 1947 State Constitution. Her non-reappointment is a result of the impasse between Republican Governor Chris Christie and the Democratic State Senate over the Supreme Court appointments. Christie said he wished to spare Hoens a Senate hearing in which she would be denied reappointment. Hoens is identified as a Republican, as is Gov. Christie. His nominee for her replacement, Cuban-American Faustino Fernandez-Vina, is also identified as a Republican, but was approved by the State Senate .

== Decisions ==
=== 2008-09 Term ===
- Bosland v. Warnock Dodge, Inc.
- Czar, Inc. v. Jo Anne Heath
- Riya Finnegan LLC v. Twp. Council of South Brunswick

=== 2007-08 Term ===
- Brundage v. Carambio
- Cicchetti v. Morris County Sheriff's Office
- Cruz v. Central Jersey Landscaping, Inc.
- IMO the Estate of Madeleine Stockdale
- IMO Russell T. Kivler
- In re the Contest of Nov. 8, 2005 General Election for the Office of Mayor of the Twp. of Parsippany-Troy Hills
- N.J. Society for the Prevention of Cruelty to Animals v. N.J. Department of Agriculture
- Pizullo v. N.J. Manufacturers Insurance Co.
- State v. Chun
- Reilly v. AAA Mid-Atlantic Insurance Co.
- Tartaglia v. UBS PaineWebber, Inc.

=== 2006-07 Term ===
- Carter v. Twp. of Bordentown
- In re Lead Paint Litigation
- Liguori v. Elmann
- Pascack Valley Regional High School Board of Education v. Pascack Valley Regional Support Staff Association
- Roberts v. Division of State Police
- State v. Drury
- State v. Figueroa
- Thurber v. City of Burlington
