= Sustainable Jersey =

Sustainable Jersey is a certification program for municipalities in New Jersey. It is a 501(c)(3) non-profit organization that is helping New Jersey towns build a better world for future generations by supporting community efforts to reduce waste, cut greenhouse gas emissions, and improve environmental equity. It provides tools, training and financial incentives to support and reward communities as they pursue sustainability programs. New Jersey is the first state in the United States to have a comprehensive sustainability program for communities that links certification with strong state and private financial incentives, and a fully resourced program of technical support and training. Currently, 422 of New Jersey's 565 municipalities are participating in the municipal sustainability certification program. In October 2014, Sustainable Jersey for Schools was launched in partnership with New Jersey School Boards Association and other statewide educational organizations to certify public schools.

== History ==
The Sustainable Jersey certification program was launched in February 2009. Sustainable Jersey began as a collaborative effort between the New Jersey State League of Municipalities' Mayors' Committee for a Green Future and the Municipal Land Use Center at The College of New Jersey, in partnership with the New Jersey Department of Environmental Protection, and the New Jersey Board of Public Utilities. In 2012, Sustainable Jersey evolved from a partnership into a non-profit organization with a Board of Directors.

== Program Overview ==
Only New Jersey municipalities can apply for certification and participation is strictly voluntary. No fees are charged to local governments and the only required action is to have a Green Team appointed by the municipal governing body. The program provides local governments with a clear mission and a menu of sustainable actions to achieve. The technical content of the program's actions are developed with the help of task forces composed of local officials, experts, non-profit groups, and members of the business community. Recommended best practices/actions are vetted with local government officials. Training, monthly workshops and technical support is provided to communities in order to build general capacity and effectiveness of local governments and Green Teams for implementing the program.

== Grants Program ==
Sustainable Jersey provides funding to local governments for sustainability projects. To date (January 2015) more than $1,600,000 has been awarded through the 2009-2014 Sustainable Jersey Grants program. Over 221 grants have been given to New Jersey municipalities representing 20 counties for sustainability projects to make communities more livable, environmentally friendly and prosperous.

== Sponsors ==
The program is sponsored by a number of private and public organizations.

== Certification ==
The certification process is built around a points system based around three components: Prosperity, People, and Planet. Within these components there are over 137 actions that municipalities can take to earn points. Participating municipalities can achieve either Bronze or Silver awards.

== Participating Towns ==
422 towns are registered and working towards certification. That is 75% percent of towns from the 565 municipalities in New Jersey. Nearly 86% of New Jersey's population lives in registered/certified Sustainable Jersey communities. A total of 177 municipalities are certified: 149 bronze and 28 silver.
