= Hunterdon Developmental Center =

Developmental center in New Jersey, US

Coordinates: 40.627780°N 74.924719°W

Hunterdon Developmental Center (HDC) is a developmental center located on 102 acres in Union Township, Hunterdon County, New Jersey, near Clinton. It opened in 1969 and provides a broad spectrum of behavioral, medical and habilitation services to women and men with intellectual and developmental disabilities. HDC also operates a Work Activity Center (WAC). As of March 2017, HDC had a census of 480 residents.

The center is for adults with neurodevelopmental disorders complicated by cognitive dysfunction. It is a 650-bed residential facility. Established diagnoses include Down syndrome, Fragile X syndrome, Trisomy 8 mosaic syndrome, Trisomy 13 syndrome, Williams syndrome, Angelman syndrome, Smith–Magenis syndrome, PKU, Tuberous sclerosis, Neurofibromatosis, Sturge–Weber syndrome, Congenital rubella syndrome, the syndrome of hypoxic/ischemic perinatal brain injury, lead encephalopathy, hydrocephalus, prosencephaly, schizencephaly, and other diagnoses.

It was originally the Hunterdon State School and started in 1966. It was also known as the Hunterdon State School for the Retarded.
