= Jutland, New Jersey =

Populated place in Hunterdon County, New Jersey, US

- Unincorporated community
- Location of Jutland in Hunterdon County Inset: Location of county within the state of New Jersey Jutland, New Jersey (New Jersey) Jutland, New Jersey (the United States)
- Coordinates: 40°37′22″N 74°57′52″W
- Country: United States
- State: New Jersey
- County: Hunterdon
- Township: Union
- Elevation: 328 ft (100 m)
- GNIS feature ID: 877508

Jutland is an unincorporated community located within Union Township in Hunterdon County, in the U.S. state of New Jersey.

Jutland is located approximately 1.2 mi (1.9 km) south of Interstate 78. Jutland Lake and Jutland Dam are located east of the settlement.

== History ==
The Lehigh Valley Railroad completed the New Jersey part of its main line through Jutland using its Easton and Amboy Railroad subsidiary in 1875 (the line for the majority of its existence traveled between Buffalo, New York and New York City) and in the early 1900s, a depot was erected in Jutland. The Lehigh Valley Railroad main line is now called the Lehigh Line now owned and operated by the Norfolk Southern Railway.

Jutland was a center for produce marketing, and fruit and milk were the most popular items transported to New York City. The Hunterdon County Fruit Exchange was located in Jutland, and in 1889 about 16,000 baskets of peaches were processed there. Jutland had a post office, farm equipment store, blacksmith, large fertilizer and feed store, school (now a day-care center), and town hall.
