= Douglas M. Fasciale =

American judge (born 1960)

Douglas Fasciale

Justice of the New Jersey Supreme Court
- Incumbent
- Assumed office September 1, 2022; Acting: September 1, 2022 – October 21, 2022
- Appointed by: Stuart Rabner (acting); Phil Murphy (confirmation)
- Preceded by: Faustino J. Fernandez-Vina

Justice of the New Jersey Superior Court, Appellate Division
- In office August 1, 2010 – September 1, 2022
- Appointed by: Stuart Rabner

Justice of the New Jersey Superior Court
- In office November 5, 2004 – August 1, 2010
- Appointed by: Jim McGreevey

Personal details
- Born: November 5, 1960 (age 65) Hackensack, New Jersey, U.S.
- Party: Republican
- Education: Seton Hall University (BA, JD); Duke University (LLM)

Douglas M. Fasciale (born November 5, 1960) is an American lawyer who serves as a justice of the Supreme Court of New Jersey. He is a former judge of the New Jersey Superior Court, Appellate Division. In August 2022, he was appointed by Chief Justice Stuart Rabner as a temporary justice of the Supreme Court of New Jersey. In October 2022, he was confirmed to a permanent position on the court.

== Early life and education ==
Fasciale was born on November 5, 1960, in Hackensack, New Jersey. He received a Bachelor of Arts from Seton Hall University in 1982 and a Juris Doctor from Seton Hall University School of Law in 1986. In May 2023, Fasciale received a Master of Laws degree in judicial studies from Duke University School of Law's Bolch Judicial Institute, a program for sitting judges, and was the graduating class speaker. His Master of Laws thesis, "A Case Study Analyzing How Trial Judge Experience Shapes Intermediate Appellate Review of Discretionary Determinations," was published by the Seton Hall Law Review.

== Career ==
Fasciale was a partner with Hoagland, Longo, Moran, Dunst & Doukas until 2004. He was appointed to the New Jersey Superior Court by Governor Jim McGreevey and assumed office on November 5, 2004. He served in the special civil part of the superior court as well as the family, civil, and criminal parts of the Superior Court, including terms as presiding judge of both the civil and criminal parts. On June 23, 2010, Chief Justice Stuart Rabner announced that Fasciale would be elevated to the appellate division of the superior court, effective August 1, 2010.

=== New Jersey Supreme Court ===
==== Appointment ====
In August 2022, Fasciale was one of three judges temporarily appointed by Chief Justice Stuart Rabner to fill the vacancies left by retirements in order to bring the court up to a full roster.

==== Nomination ====
In June 2022, Fasciale was rumored to be on a shortlist for appointment to the New Jersey Supreme Court. On September 14, 2022, Governor Phil Murphy announced his intent to nominate Fasciale to serve as a justice of the Supreme Court of New Jersey. Governor Murphy nominated Fasciale to the seat vacated by Justice Faustino J. Fernandez-Vina, who retired on February 15, 2022. The announcement comes as a deal reached with Senator Holly Schepisi for her to lift her hold on the nomination of Rachel Wainer Apter. On October 13, 2022, his nomination was voted out of committee by a unanimous vote. On October 17, 2022, his nomination was confirmed by a 37–0 vote. He was sworn into office on October 21, 2022.

== Personal life ==
Fasciale lives in Westfield, New Jersey, with his wife Teresa and two sons. He is a Republican.

Legal offices
Preceded by Faustino J. Fernandez-Vina	Justice of the New Jersey Supreme Court; 2022–present	Incumbent
