= Union Township, Hunterdon County, New Jersey =

Township in Hunterdon County, New Jersey, US

Union Township, New Jersey
- Township
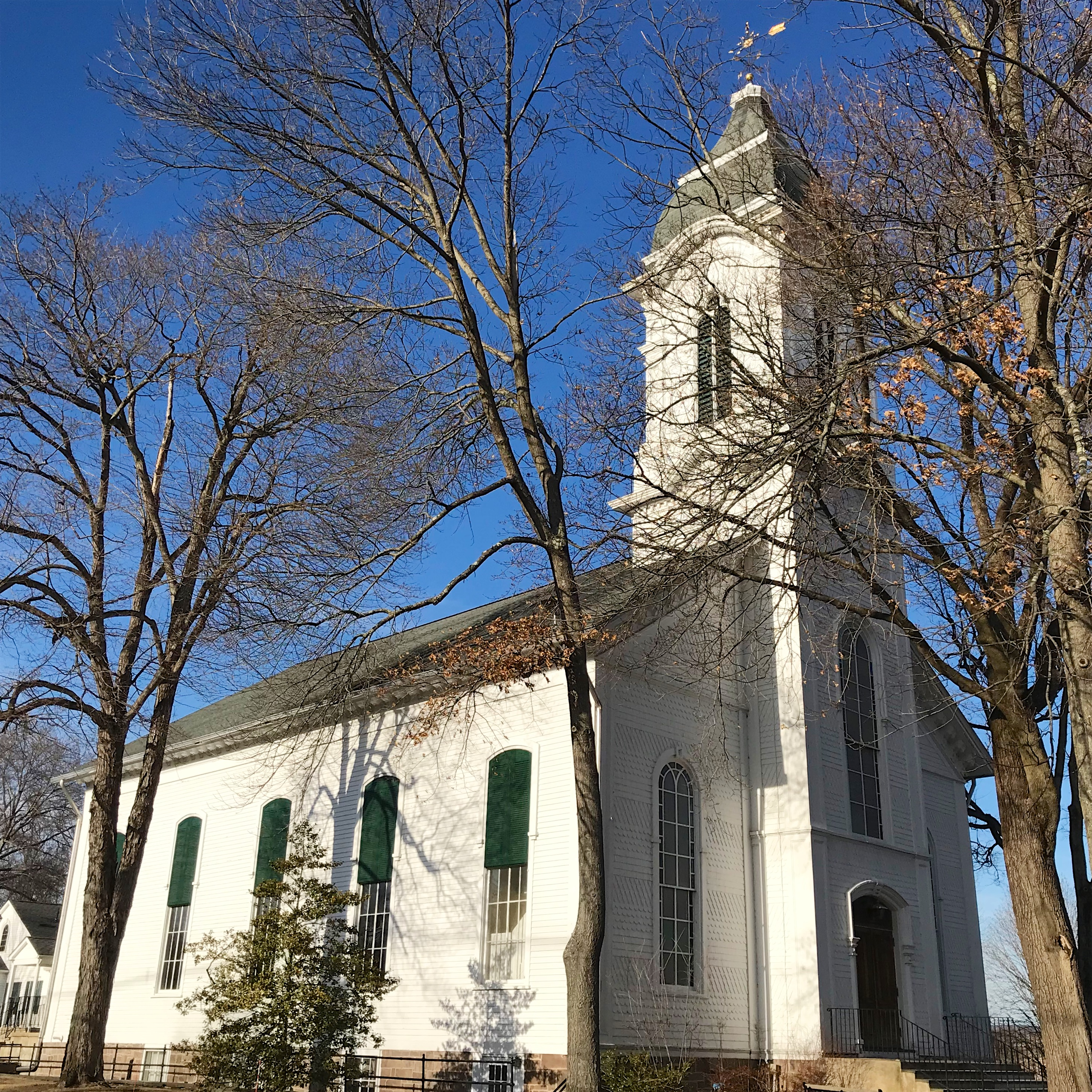
- Presbyterian Church in Grandin

- Seal

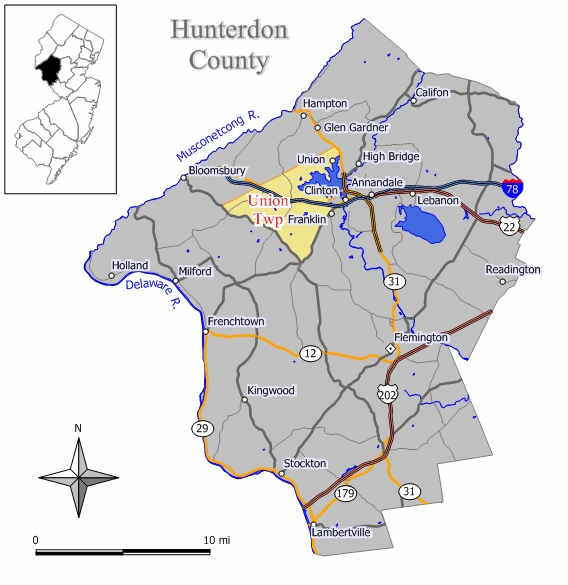
- Location of Union Township in Hunterdon County highlighted in yellow (right). Inset map: Location of Hunterdon County in New Jersey highlighted in black (left).

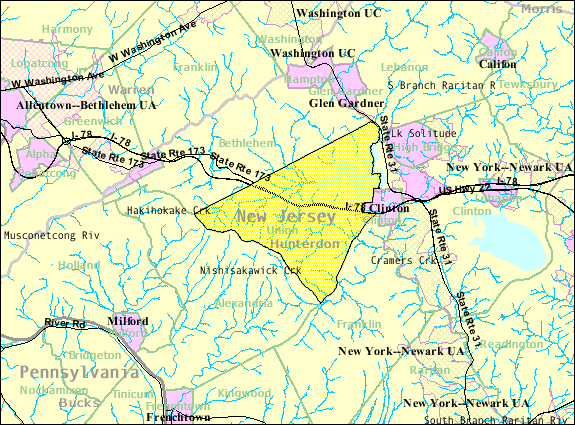
- Census Bureau map of Union Township, Hunterdon County, New Jersey

- Location in Hunterdon County Location in New Jersey Location in the United States
- Coordinates: 40.632215°N 74.964965°W
- Country: United States
- State: New Jersey
- County: Hunterdon
- Incorporated: February 17, 1853
- Named for: Union Furnace

Government
  - Type: Township
  - Body: Township Committee
  - Mayor: David DeGiralamo (R, term ends December 31, 2023)
  - Municipal clerk: Ella M. Ruta

Area
  - Total: 20.63 sq mi (53.43 km^{2})
  - Land: 18.76 sq mi (48.60 km^{2})
  - Water: 1.86 sq mi (4.83 km^{2}) 9.03%
  - Rank: 138th of 565 in state 14th of 26 in county
- Elevation: 407 ft (124 m)

Population (2020)
  - Total: 6,507
  - Estimate (2023): 6,391
  - Rank: 327th of 565 in state 4th of 26 in county
  - Density: 346.8/sq mi (133.9/km^{2})
  - Rank: 465th of 565 in state 15th of 26 in county
- Time zone: UTC−05:00 (Eastern (EST))
  - Summer (DST): UTC−04:00 (Eastern (EDT))
- ZIP Code: 08827 – Hampton
- Area code: 908
- FIPS code: 3401974420
- GNIS feature ID: 0882188
- Website: www.uniontwp-hcnj.gov

Union Township is a township in Hunterdon County, in the U.S. state of New Jersey. The southwest half of the township lies on what is known as the Hunterdon Plateau, the northwest corner consists of the Musconetcong Ridge and the northeast section is part of the lower-lying Newark Basin around Spruce Run Reservoir. As of the 2020 United States census, the township's population was 6,507, its highest ever decennial count and an increase of 599 (+10.1%) from the 2010 census count of 5,908, which in turn reflected a decline of 252 (−4.1%) from the 6,160 counted in the 2000 census.

Union was incorporated as a township by an act of the New Jersey Legislature on February 17, 1853, from portions of Bethlehem Township. Clinton Town was formed on April 5, 1865, within portions of the township, and became an independent municipality in 1895. The township was named for Union Furnace, which was producing iron from 1742 until the 1780s. The name "Union" was chosen over the alternative "Rockhill", which was a community at the southern end of the township.

Union Furnace and its forge produced cannonballs for the Revolutionary War and shoes for horses and oxen, as well as farm implements. Farms and fields were established in areas where trees were felled to provide fuel for the furnace. A farm community developed, together with basket making and tanning industries.

New Jersey Monthly magazine ranked Union Township 21st in its 2008 rankings of the "Best Places To Live" in New Jersey.

== Geography ==
According to the United States Census Bureau, township had a total area of 20.63 square miles (53.43 km^{2}), including 18.77 square miles (48.60 km^{2}) of land and 1.86 square miles (4.83 km^{2}) of water (9.03%).

Unincorporated communities, localities and place names located partially or completely within the township include Coles Mills, Grandin, Hensfoot, Jutland, Kingtown, Mechlings Corner, Mount Salem, Norton, Pattenburg, Perryville, Polktown and Van Syckel.

Pittstown is an unincorporated community that is also spread across Alexandria Township and Franklin Township.

The township borders the Hunterdon County municipalities of Alexandria Township, Bethlehem Township, Clinton, Clinton Township, Franklin Township and Lebanon Township.

== Demographics ==
Historical population
Census	Pop.	Note	%±
1860	1,217		—
1870	1,051		−13.6%
1880	1,167		11.0%
1890	1,134		−2.8%
1900	918		−19.0%
1910	930		1.3%
1920	834		−10.3%
1930	1,152		38.1%
1940	1,303		13.1%
1950	1,557		19.5%
1960	1,717		10.3%
1970	2,351		36.9%
1980	3,971		68.9%
1990	5,078		27.9%
2000	6,160		21.3%
2010	5,908		−4.1%
2020	6,507		10.1%
2023 (est.)	6,391		−1.8%
Population sources: 1860–1920 1870; 1880–1890 1890–1910; 1910–1930 1940–2000; 2000 2010 2020

Two large state facilities in the township, the Edna Mahan Correctional Facility for Women (with 650 inmates in 2018) and Hunterdon Developmental Center (which had 480 residents as of 2017), account for almost 20% of the residents counted by the Census Bureau. Their inclusion skews the township's demographic characteristics. The unusual ratio of 100 females there vs. 77.5 males and the presence of 12.5% of residents but no families being below the poverty linen is largely due to the nature of the residents of these two facilities.

=== 2010 census ===
The 2010 United States census counted 5,908 people, 1,752 households, and 1,221 families in the township. The population density was 315.3 per square mile (121.7/km^{2}). There were 1,830 housing units at an average density of 97.7 per square mile (37.7/km^{2}). The racial makeup was 83.21% (4,916) White, 9.06% (535) Black or African American, 0.15% (9) Native American, 4.13% (244) Asian, 0.05% (3) Pacific Islander, 1.61% (95) from other races, and 1.79% (106) from two or more races. Hispanic or Latino of any race were 6.08% (359) of the population.

Of the 1,752 households, 33.8% had children under the age of 18; 61.6% were married couples living together; 5.5% had a female householder with no husband present and 30.3% were non-families. Of all households, 24.8% were made up of individuals and 7.2% had someone living alone who was 65 years of age or older. The average household size was 2.57 and the average family size was 3.12.

18.4% of the population were under the age of 18, 6.5% from 18 to 24, 27.8% from 25 to 44, 37.6% from 45 to 64, and 9.6% who were 65 years of age or older. The median age was 43.7 years. For every 100 females, the population had 77.5 males. For every 100 females ages 18 and older there were 73.2 males.

The Census Bureau's 2006–2010 American Community Survey showed that (in 2010 inflation-adjusted dollars) median household income was $103,304 (with a margin of error of +/− $11,761) and the median family income was $126,157 (+/− $23,039). Males had a median income of $97,548 (+/− $31,580) versus $62,130 (+/− $7,607) for females. The per capita income for the borough was $33,753 (+/− $7,431). About none of families and 12.5% of the population were below the poverty line, including none of those under age 18 and 13.8% of those age 65 or over.

=== 2000 census ===
As of the 2000 United States census there were 6,160 people, 1,666 households, and 1,162 families residing in the township. The population density was 324.8 inhabitants per square mile (125.4/km^{2}). There were 1,725 housing units at an average density of 90.9 per square mile (35.1/km^{2}). The racial makeup of the township was 81.83% White, 13.36% African American, 0.18% Native American, 1.59% Asian, 0.02% Pacific Islander, 1.59% from other races, and 1.43% from two or more races. Hispanic or Latino of any race were 5.13% of the population.

There were 1,666 households, out of which 35.9% had children under the age of 18 living with them, 62.4% were married couples living together, 4.6% had a female householder with no husband present, and 30.2% were non-families. 24.3% of all households were made up of individuals, and 5.4% had someone living alone who was 65 years of age or older. The average household size was 2.61 and the average family size was 3.18.

In the township the population was spread out, with 19.2% under the age of 18, 5.9% from 18 to 24, 43.4% from 25 to 44, 25.0% from 45 to 64, and 6.6% who were 65 years of age or older. The median age was 38 years. For every 100 females, there were 71.0 males. For every 100 females age 18 and over, there were 65.2 males.

The median income for a household in the township was $81,089, and the median income for a family was $102,146. Males had a median income of $64,375 versus $41,795 for females. The per capita income for the township was $29,535. About 0.4% of families and 1.6% of the population were below the poverty line, including 1.3% of those under age 18 and 4.2% of those age 65 or over.

== Government ==
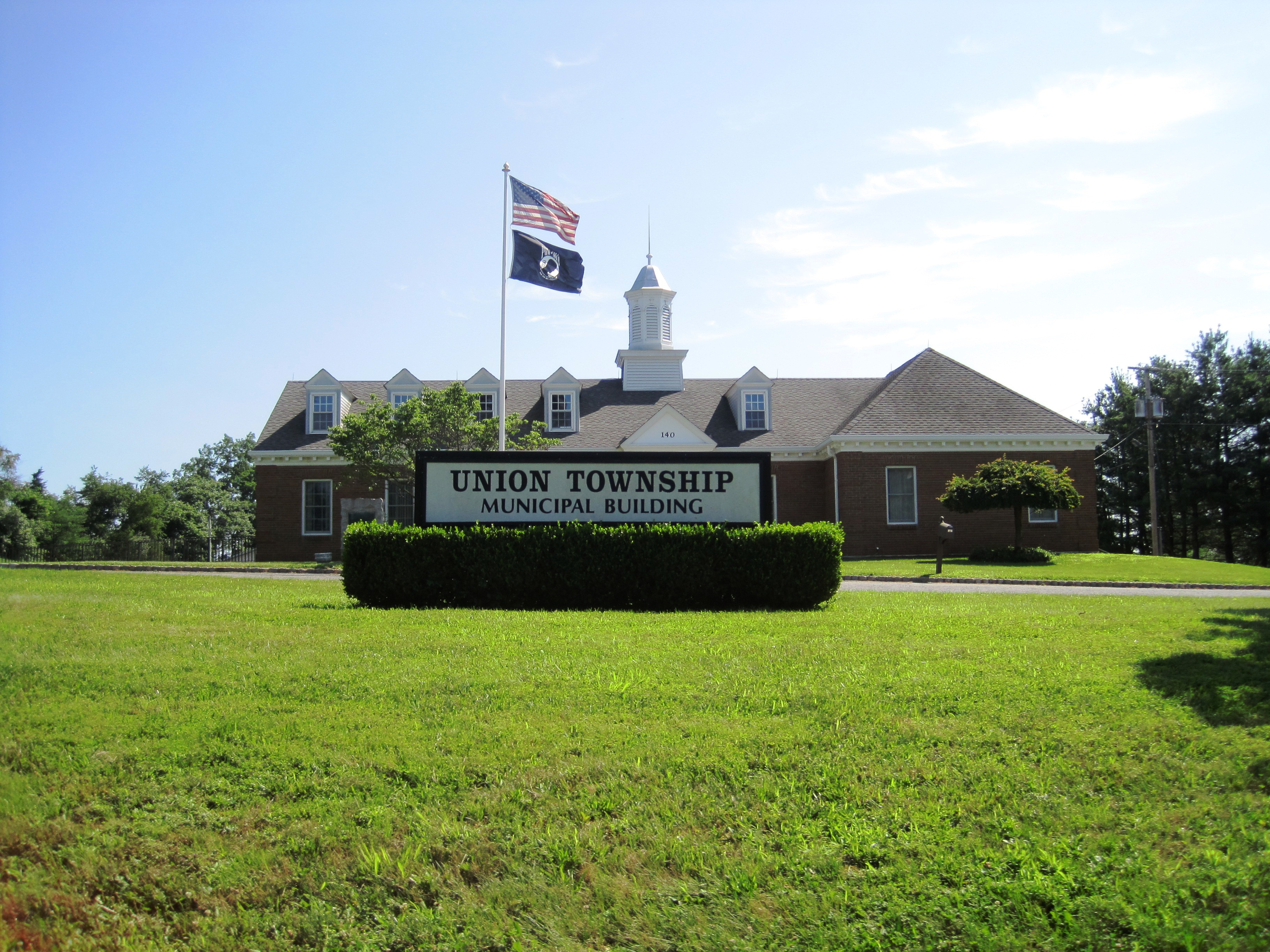
Union Township Municipal Building

=== Local government ===
Union Township is governed under the Township form of New Jersey municipal government, one of 141 municipalities (of the 564) statewide that use this form, the second-most commonly used form of government in the state. The Township Committee is comprised of five members, who are elected directly by the voters at-large in partisan elections to serve three-year terms of office on a staggered basis, with either one or two seats coming up for election each year as part of the November general election in a three-year cycle. At an annual reorganization meeting, the Township Committee selects one of its members to serve as Mayor and another as Deputy Mayor.

As of 2023, members of the Union Township Committee are Mayor David DeGiralamo (R, term on committee ends December 31, 2024; term as mayor ends 2023), Deputy Mayor Page Stiger (R, term on committee ends 2025; term as deputy mayor ends 2023), Bruce R. Hirt (R, 2023), Richard Lordi (R, 2024) and Frank T. Mazza (R, 2023).

In February 2019, the Township Committee selected Page Stiger from a list of three candidates nominated by the Republican municipal committee to fill the seat expiring in December 2019 that was vacated by Michael Sroka when he resigned from office the previous month.

In 2010, the Township's Environmental Commission earned Union Township the distinction of becoming the first community in Hunterdon County to achieve certification under the Sustainable Jersey program, which works to help communities reduce waste, cut greenhouse gas emissions and improve environmental equity.

=== Federal, state and county representation ===
Union Township is located in the 7th Congressional District and is part of New Jersey's 23rd state legislative district.

For the 119th United States Congress, New Jersey's 7th congressional district is represented by Thomas Kean Jr. (R, Westfield). New Jersey is represented in the United States Senate by Democrats Cory Booker (Newark, term ends 2027) and Andy Kim (Moorestown, term ends 2031).

For the 2026–2027 session, the 23rd legislative district of the New Jersey Legislature is represented in the State Senate by Doug Steinhardt (R, Lopatcong Township) and in the General Assembly by John DiMaio (R, Hackettstown) and Erik Peterson (R, Franklin Township).

Hunterdon County is governed by a Board of County Commissioners comprised of five members who are elected at-large on a partisan basis to serve three-year terms of office on a staggered basis, with either one or two seats up for election each year as part of the November general election. At an annual reorganization meeting held each January, the commissioners select one member to serve as the board's Director and another to serve as Deputy Director, each for a one-year term. As of 2025, Hunterdon County's Commissioners are Director John E. Lanza (R; Raritan Township, 2025), Deputy Director Shaun C. Van Doren (R; Tewksbury Township, 2026), Jeff Kuhl (R; Raritan Township, 2027), Zachary T. Rich (R; West Amwell Township, 2025) and Susan Soloway (R; Franklin Township, 2027).

Constitutional officers elected on a countywide basis are Clerk Mary H. Melfi (R; Flemington, 2026), Sheriff Fredrick W. Brown (R; Alexandria Township, 2025) and Surrogate Heidi Rohrbach (R; Lebanon Township, 2028).

Two state facilities, the New Jersey Department of Corrections Edna Mahan Correctional Facility for Women (with 650 inmates in 2018), and the New Jersey Department of Human Services Hunterdon Developmental Center (which had 480 residents as of 2017), are located in Union Township.

=== Politics ===
As of March 2011, there were a total of 3,226 registered voters in Union Township, of which 1,335 (41.4%) were registered as Republicans, 574 (17.8%) were registered as Democrats, and 1,312 (40.7%) were registered as Unaffiliated. There were five voters registered as Libertarians or Greens.

Gubernatorial election results for Union Township
Year	Republican		Democratic		Third party(ies)	
Year	No.	%	No.	%	No.	%
2025	1,233	52.69%	1,097	46.88%	10	0.43%
2021	1,230	61.87%	736	37.02%	22	1.11%
2017	977	62.47%	554	35.42%	33	2.11%
2013	1,179	77.16%	321	21.01%	28	1.83%
2009	1,303	71.79%	366	20.17%	146	8.04%
2005	1,046	66.71%	433	27.61%	89	5.68%

In the 2012 presidential election, Republican Mitt Romney received 60.8% of the vote (1,545 cast), ahead of Democrat Obama with 37.6% (955 votes), and other candidates with 1.7% (42 votes), among the 2,560 ballots cast by the township's 3,416 registered voters (18 ballots were spoiled), for a turnout of 74.9%. In the 2008 presidential election, Republican John McCain received 58.9% of the vote here (1,568 cast), ahead of Democrat Barack Obama with 38.7% (1,030 votes) and other candidates with 1.3% (35 votes), among the 2,662 ballots cast by the township's 3,265 registered voters, for a turnout of 81.5%. In the 2004 presidential election, Republican George W. Bush received 64.3% of the vote here (1,566 ballots cast), outpolling Democrat John Kerry with 35.3% (860 votes) and other candidates with 1.1% (34 votes), among the 2,437 ballots cast by the township's 2,992 registered voters, for a turnout percentage of 81.5.

United States presidential election results for Union Township
Year	Republican		Democratic		Third party(ies)	
Year	No.	%	No.	%	No.	%
2024	1,628	54.03%	1,318	43.74%	67	2.22%
2020	1,644	52.17%	1,443	45.79%	64	2.03%
2016	1,486	57.49%	971	37.56%	128	4.95%
2012	1,545	60.78%	955	37.57%	42	1.65%
2008	1,568	59.55%	1,030	39.12%	35	1.33%
2004	1,566	63.66%	860	34.96%	34	1.38%

In the 2013 gubernatorial election, Republican Chris Christie received 77.2% of the vote (1,179 cast), ahead of Democrat Barbara Buono with 21.0% (321 votes), and other candidates with 1.8% (28 votes), among the 1,549 ballots cast by the township's 3,409 registered voters (21 ballots were spoiled), for a turnout of 45.4%. In the 2009 gubernatorial election, Republican Chris Christie received 70.9% of the vote here (1,303 ballots cast), ahead of Democrat Jon Corzine with 19.9% (366 votes), Independent Chris Daggett with 7.6% (139 votes) and other candidates with 0.4% (7 votes), among the 1,837 ballots cast by the township's 3,214 registered voters, yielding a 57.2% turnout.

United States Senate election results for Union Township1
Year	Republican		Democratic		Third party(ies)	
Year	No.	%	No.	%	No.	%
2024	1,545	54.48%	1,216	42.88%	75	2.64%
2018	1,389	59.69%	860	36.96%	78	3.35%
2012	1,448	60.66%	865	36.24%	74	3.10%
2006	983	62.37%	514	32.61%	79	5.01%

United States Senate election results for Union Township2
Year	Republican		Democratic		Third party(ies)	
Year	No.	%	No.	%	No.	%
2020	1,690	54.87%	1,319	42.82%	71	2.31%
2014	823	64.55%	429	33.65%	23	1.80%
2013	723	67.63%	342	31.99%	4	0.37%
2008	1,601	64.61%	785	31.68%	92	3.71%

== Education ==
The Union Township School District serves students in pre-kindergarten through eighth grade. As of the 2023–24 school year, the district, comprised of two schools, had an enrollment of 478 students and 50.7 classroom teachers (on an FTE basis), for a student–teacher ratio of 9.4:1. Schools in the district (with 2023–24 enrollment data from the National Center for Education Statistics) are Union Township Elementary School with 220 students in grades PreK–3 and Union Township Middle School with 253 students in grades 4–8.

Public school students in ninth through twelfth grades attend North Hunterdon High School in Annandale, which also serves students from Bethlehem Township, Clinton Town, Clinton Township, Franklin Township and Lebanon Borough. As of the 2023–24 school year, the high school had an enrollment of 1,262 students and 115.5 classroom teachers (on an FTE basis), for a student–teacher ratio of 10.9:1. The school is part of the North Hunterdon-Voorhees Regional High School District, which also includes students from Califon, Glen Gardner, Hampton, High Bridge, Lebanon Township and Tewksbury Township, who attend Voorhees High School in Lebanon Township. Union Township's representative on the high school district's board of education receives 1.4 weighted votes.

Eighth grade students from all of Hunterdon County are eligible to apply to attend the high school programs offered by the Hunterdon County Vocational School District, a county-wide vocational school district that offers career and technical education at its campuses in Raritan Township and at programs sited at local high schools, with no tuition charged to students for attendance.

== Transportation ==
=== Roads and highways ===
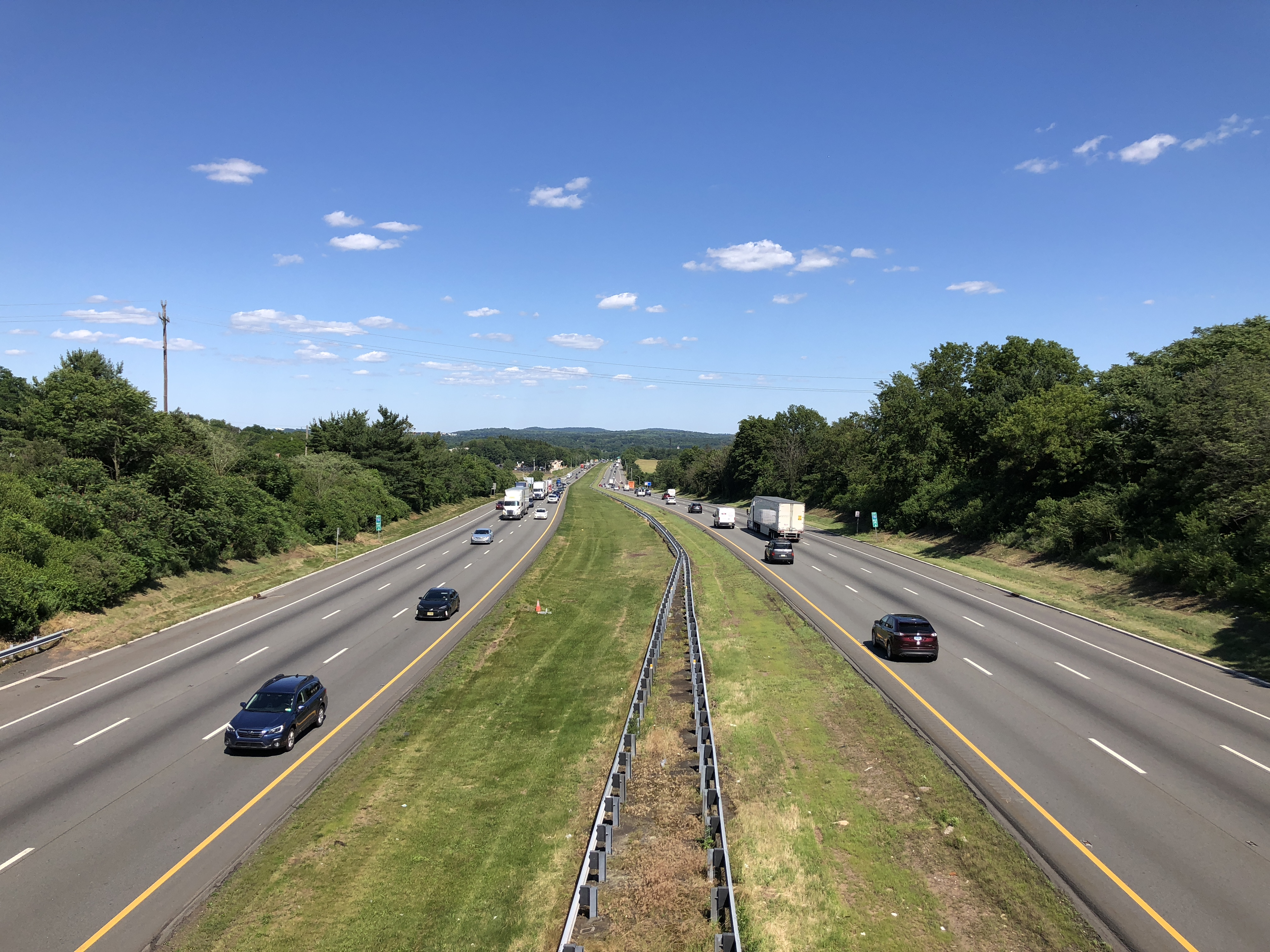
Interstate 78 / U.S. 22 eastbound in Union Township

As of May 2010, the township had a total of 64.00 miles (103.00 km) of roadways, of which 43.08 miles (69.33 km) were maintained by the municipality, 11.51 miles (18.52 km) by Hunterdon County and 9.41 miles (15.14 km) by the New Jersey Department of Transportation.

Union is accessible by a variety of roads. The most prominent roadway is Interstate 78 / U.S. 22, which run concurrently through Union Township. Route 173 passes through the center and eventually merges briefly with both. County Route 513 runs along the southeastern border while County Route 579 goes along the southwestern border.

=== Rail service ===
The Norfolk Southern Railway's Lehigh Line (formerly the mainline of the Lehigh Valley Railroad), runs through Union Township.

== Notable people ==
People who were born in, residents of, or otherwise closely associated with Union Township include:

- Scott Bradlee (born 1981), musician, pianist, composer, and arranger best known for his viral videos on YouTube, including his work under the moniker Postmodern Jukebox
- Daniel Karcher (born 1964), is an NPR host and filmmaker, best known as host for WBGO, where he serves as the station's "full-time substitute host"
- John Penn (1729–1795), last colonial governor of Pennsylvania
- Charles Rinehart (1875–1933), football player, engineer and businessman who was elected to the College Football Hall of Fame in 1964
- Lloyd Wescott (1907–1990), agriculturalist, civil servant, and philanthropist
- Glenway Wescott (1911–1987), novelist during the 1920s and 1930s and a figure in the American expatriate literary community in Paris during the 1920s
