= Faustino J. Fernandez-Vina =

American judge (born 1952)

Faustino J. Fernandez-Vina “Fuzzy”

Associate Justice of the New Jersey Supreme Court
- In office November 19, 2013 – February 15, 2022
- Appointed by: Chris Christie
- Preceded by: Helen E. Hoens
- Succeeded by: Douglas M. Fasciale

Personal details
- Born: February 15, 1952 (age 73); Santiago, Cuba
- Political party: Republican
- Education: Widener University (BA); Rutgers University (JD)

Faustino J. Fernandez-Vina (born February 15, 1952) is a former associate justice of the New Jersey Supreme Court. Fernandez-Vina was nominated to the Supreme Court by Governor Chris Christie on September 30, 2013, and was sworn into office on November 19, 2013, following confirmation by the New Jersey Senate. He left the court when he reached the mandatory retirement age of 70 on February 15, 2022.

Born on February 15, 1952, in Santiago, Cuba, Fernandez-Vina was appointed to the Superior Court bench by Governor James E. McGreevey on July 16, 2004. Fernandez-Vina first sat in the civil division of the Camden Vicinage. He moved to the family division in 2006 and was named presiding judge of the civil division on Feb. 1, 2007. Chief Justice Stuart Rabner named him assignment judge of the Camden Vicinage on Jan. 11, 2012.

A graduate of Widener University and Rutgers School of Law - Camden, Fernandez-Vina served as a law clerk to Superior Court Judge E. Stevenson Fluharty before going into private practice. He became a certified civil trial attorney and has served on the District IV Ethics Committee, the Supreme Court Committee on Character and the Supreme Court Committee on Jury Selection. While on the bench, Fernandez-Vina has served on a number of committees, including the Supreme Court Ad Hoc Committee on the Code of Judicial Conduct and the Supreme Court Civil Practice Committee.

== See also ==
- List of justices of the Supreme Court of New Jersey
