= Melick's Town Farm =

Melick's Town Farm is a New Jersey farm in three Hunterdon County towns—Oldwick, Califon, and Bridgewater. The farm, which totals nearly 300 acres, is one of the largest fruit growers in New Jersey. The farm is currently owned by George and Norma Melick, the ninth generation of Melicks. The family has been farming in Hunterdon County since between 1725 and 1735. George Melick says that “all of [his] ancestors in this country were born, baptized, married and buried within five miles of Oldwick.”

== Family history ==
For ten generations, the Melick family has farmed the same plot of land in Hunterdon County. In an article printed in the General Store magazine, Maude Kenyon reports that Johan Peter Moelich was the first Melick ancestor to come to America, arriving with the German Palatines. He and his brothers settled in the “rolling hills” of Bedminster and Tewksbury. Following in their father's footsteps, Wilhelm and the three boys also became farmers and tanners.

Over the years, the Moelick name evolved into three different spellings. The Moelicks in Bedminster adopted the spelling Mellick, while those in Tewksbury took on the spelling Melick. Some others spelled it Malick. George Melick jokes that “the Mellicks had enough money to afford 2 ‘l’s’ in their name”.

Johan Peter's great-grandson, John V. Melick, Jr., worked for farmer John Craig and took over his farm when he died. Melick Jr.’s son, Walter, took over the 165-acre estate when his father died and saved the farm from San Jose Scale in 1900. Although the protective spray was costly, Walter knew he had too much to lose, so he elected to spray everything.

Walter Melick’s grandson, George, is the current owner of Melick’s Town Farm. Although George’s father, George Sr., wanted his son to attend college, there was never any doubt that George, Jr. would take over the farm when his father passed. George and Norma married in 1965, went on to have three children—Peter, John, and Rebecca. The three became the first generation of Melicks to attend and graduate from college, but all three are still active on the farm, either working part- or full-time.

== Farms ==
According to its website, Melick’s currently owns farmland in three separate locations—two in Oldwick and the third in Califon. Most of the Melicks’ vegetables and strawberries are grown at the main farm in Oldwick. Here, customers have the opportunity to pick their own strawberries and pick their own flowers. The second Oldwick farm, called Cider Mill Orchards, contains about fifty acres dedicated to growing fruit. The majority of school tours and fall activities are held at Cider Mill Orchards. Califon Orchards consists of two hundred acres of land dedicated to peaches, apples, and pumpkins. Customers can pick their own peaches, pears, apples, and pumpkins at this location. These three farms combine to cover three hundred acres. A hundred of these acres make up the orchards, containing more than ten thousand apple trees and five thousand peach trees.

In a 2008 The New York Times article “Sweet Peaches,” Kelly Feeney wrote that Melick's competes with nearby superstores by selling its own fruit at its stands. Melick's has a stand at its main farm in Oldwick, where customers can directly purchase the farm's products. The farm also has other stands in Bridgewater and Califon, and attends farmers’ markets in other surrounding towns —in Chatham Borough, Denville, Highland Park, Hoboken, Madison, New Providence, and Township of Washington in Bergen County. John Melick acknowledges that, while the farm is one of the largest commercial orchards in central New Jersey, it's not nearly large enough to supply wholesalers.

== Adaptations ==
In his 2008 The New York Times article, Josh Benson reports that Melick's has had to adapt to ever-changing conditions to stay competitive. The farm had always relied on apples and other traditional crops as a means for the majority of its income. Now, as farming conditions have evolved, the farm relies increasingly on retail sales. It has become ideal for them to cultivate as many different types of crops as possible. They have expanded from a primarily “tree fruit” business, and as a result, has become “more than a million-dollar business,” according to John Melick.

Benson discusses how Melick has taken greater precautions over the past ten or so years to protect its crops. To keep out deer, George explains, they “put in four miles of eight-foot high tensile fencing to protect all three locations.” To ensure that its crops and farmland are healthy, Melick's “takes part in IPM – Integrated Pest Management,” according to Peter. “IPM advises us what to spray, where, and how much… Their scouts check it out weekly and leave us notes on how we’re doing. Through IPM and other agricultural services, we are alerted at once about problems."

In her article, Maude Kenyon reports that the Melicks have been making their own apple cider since 1962, when George Melick bought a cider press. While they had always made unpasteurized cider, the presence of e-coli in the cider forced them to begin pasteurization. However, pasteurization done through heating significantly alters the flavor of the cider. To accomplish pasteurizing without ruining the cider, the Melicks use an ultra-violet light system that maintains the true cider flavor. This system, often called "cold pasteurization," incorporates the same technology used for water treatment. Despite the high costs of the cider business, Melick's remains one of the few cider producers in the state. The Melicks know that the cider draws customers to their stands who are likely to buy more products. As of 2001, Melick's was selling 70,000 gallons of cider each year.

In 2014, John Melick, a 10th generation farmer, met with Culinary Institute of America cider maker Scott Wyant, who learned to craft cider while living in Switzerland. They created "Oldwick Hard Cider," which is available at the farm and local distributors.
