= Kline Farmhouse =

Historic house in New Jersey, United States

- U.S. National Register of Historic Places
- U.S. Historic district – Contributing property
- New Jersey Register of Historic Places
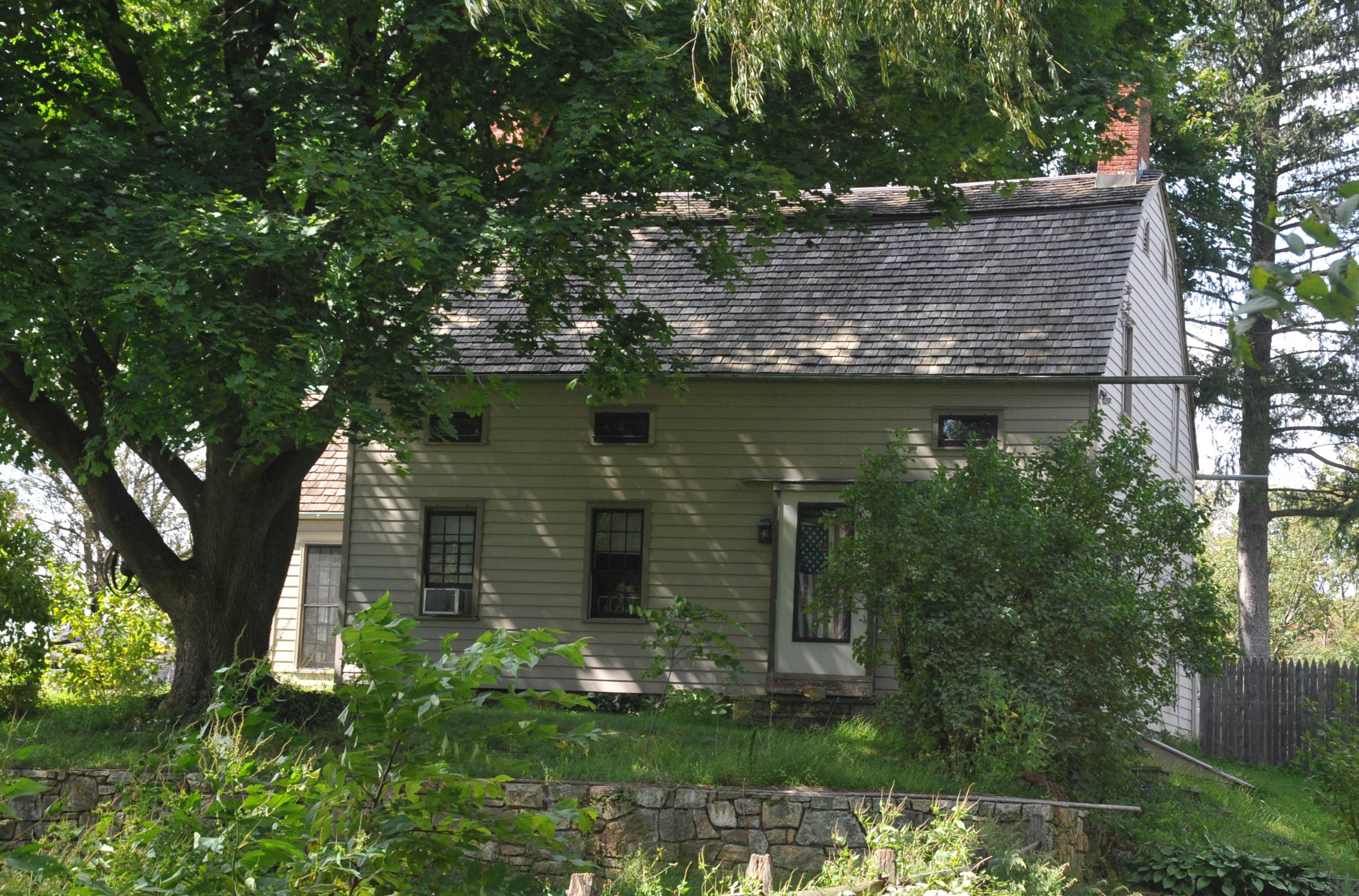

- Location within Hunterdon County, New Jersey Location within New Jersey Location within the United States
- Location: County Route 517, Oldwick, New Jersey
- Coordinates: 40°40′40″N 74°45′6″W
- Area: 12 acres (4.9 ha)
- Built: 1790s
- Built by: Jacob Kline
- Part of: Oldwick Historic District (ID88002153)
- NRHP reference No.: 84002712
- NJRHP No.: 1630

Significant dates
- Added to NRHP: July 11, 1984
- Designated CP: November 14, 1988
- Designated NJRHP: April 30, 1984

The Kline Farmhouse, also known as Cold Spring Cottage, is located on a 12-acre (4.9 ha) farm along County Route 517 (Old Turnpike Road), north of Oldwick in Tewksbury Township of Hunterdon County, New Jersey. Built by Jacob Kline in the 1790s, it was added to the National Register of Historic Places on July 11, 1984, for its significance in agriculture, architecture and settlement. Also known as the Beavers House, it was previously documented by the Historic American Buildings Survey in 1966. It was later listed as a contributing property of the Oldwick Historic District in 1988.

== History and description ==
The farmhouse was built in the 1790s by Jacob Kline, an elder at the Zion Lutheran Church in Oldwick and a county freeholder. The one and one-half story frame building overlooks a spring that feeds the Cold Brook, a tributary of the Lamington River. After Kline died in 1823, the property was sold to Joseph Bartles and Benjamin Van Doren, husbands of two of his daughters.

== See also ==
- National Register of Historic Places listings in Hunterdon County, New Jersey
- Bartles House
