= Bartles House =

Historic house in New Jersey, United States

- U.S. National Register of Historic Places
- New Jersey Register of Historic Places
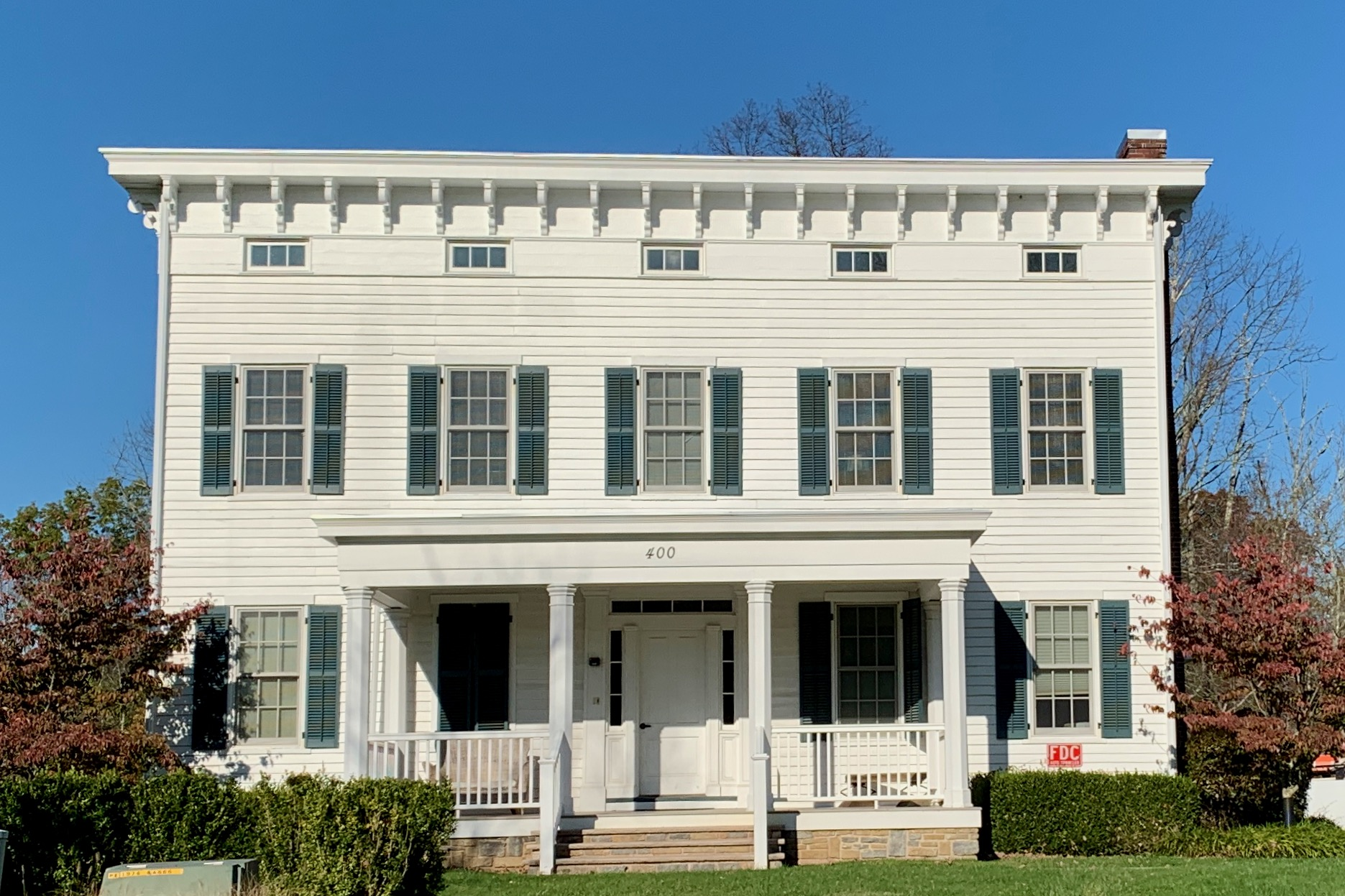

- Location within Hunterdon County, New Jersey Location within New Jersey Location within the United States
- Location: 400 Fisher Road, Tewksbury Township, New Jersey
- Nearest city: Oldwick
- Coordinates: 40°39′51″N 74°45′6″W
- Area: 1.5 acres (0.61 ha)
- Architectural style: Greek Revival, Italianate
- NRHP reference No.: 06000763
- NJRHP No.: 3546

Significant dates
- Added to NRHP: March 14, 2007
- Designated NJRHP: June 28, 2006

The Bartles House, also known as the Christy House, is a historic house located at 400 Fisher Road (formerly listed as 159 Oldwick Road) near Oldwick in Tewksbury Township of Hunterdon County, New Jersey. It was added to the National Register of Historic Places on March 14, 2007, for its significance in architecture. Described as a "vernacular cubical villa", it was built with Greek Revival style and Italianate style. The tree-lined driveway from Oldwick Road is a contributing site of the listing.

== History ==
The Bartles family owned property in the area for farming since the 1700s. Joseph Bartles (1784–1865) built this house c. 1842–1862. In 1956, it was bought by Stephen and Vieva Christy. It was later purchased by the township in 1999.

== Gallery ==
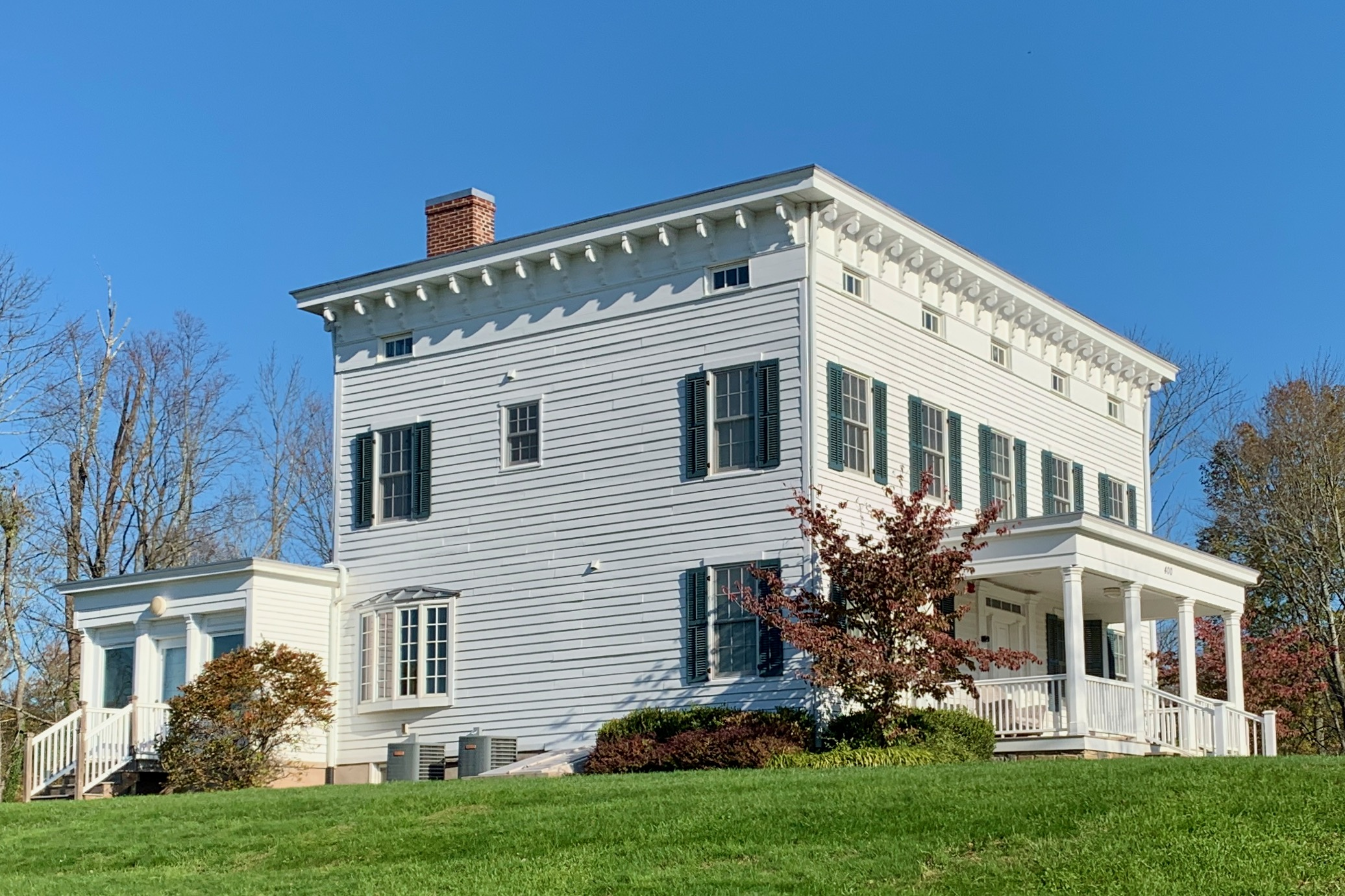
Looking north

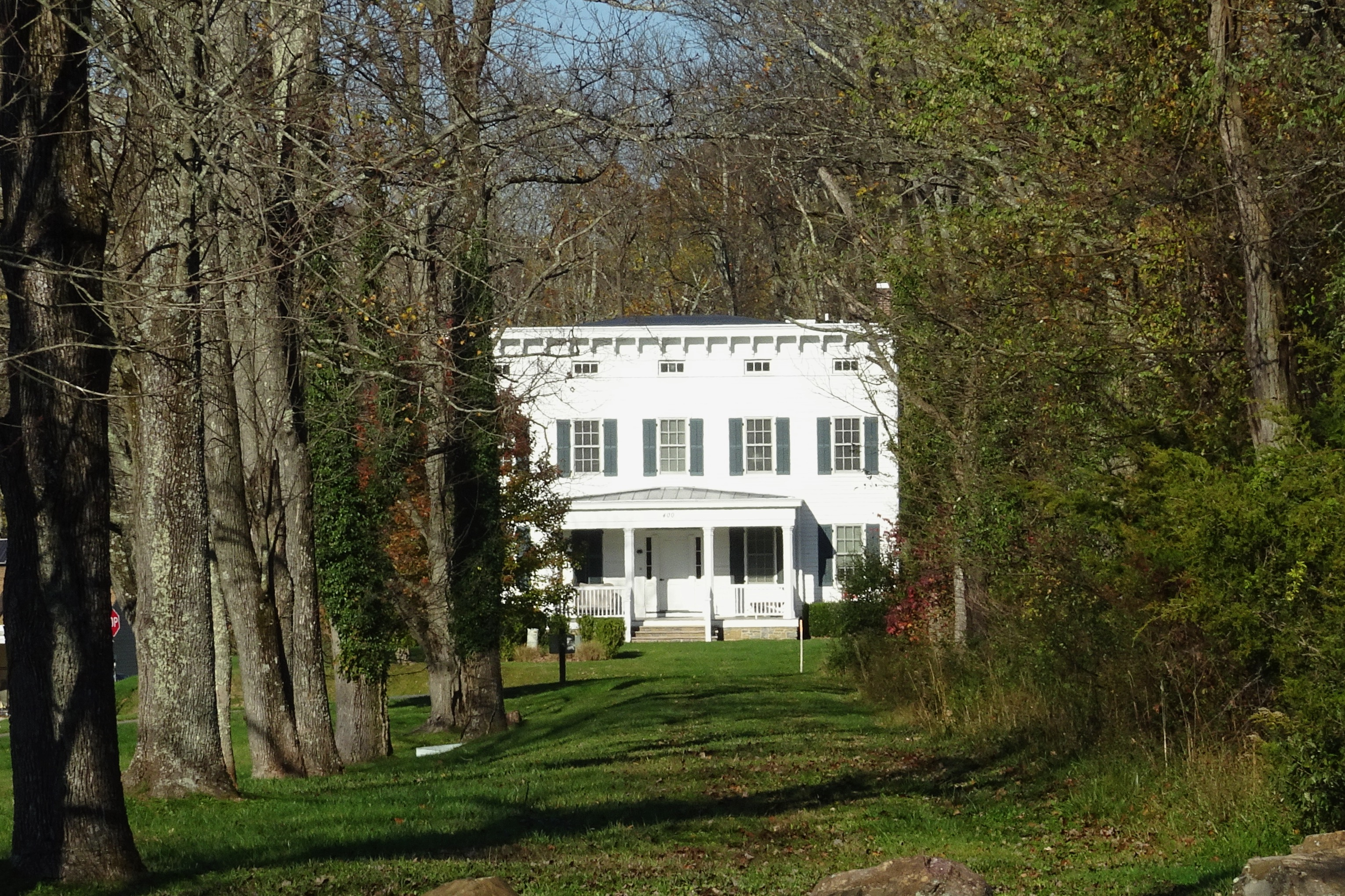
Tree-lined former driveway from Oldwick Road

== See also ==
- National Register of Historic Places listings in Hunterdon County, New Jersey
