= Lawrence R. Hafstad =

American electrical engineer and physicist

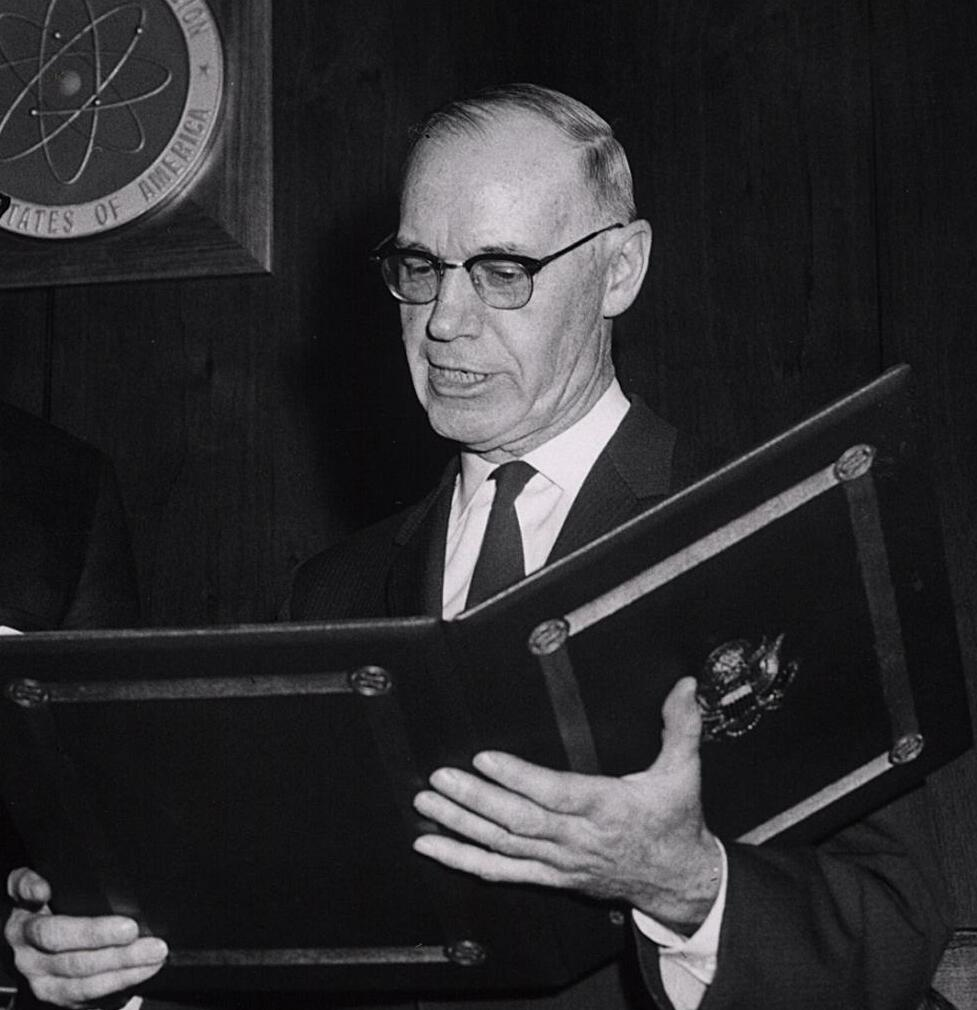
- Hafstad in 1967
- Born: Lawrence Randolph Hafstad; June 18, 1904; Minneapolis, Minnesota, U.S.
- Died: October 12, 1993 (aged 89); Oldwick, New Jersey, U.S.
- Education: University of Minnesota (BSc); Johns Hopkins University (PhD)
- Occupations: Nuclear physicist; Electrical engineer
- Employers: Carnegie Institution for Science; Office of Scientific Research and Development; Johns Hopkins University; Atomic Energy Commission; General Motors
- Spouse: Katharine Clarke-Hafstad (m. 1933, div. 1939)
- Awards: AAAS Prize

Lawrence Randolph Hafstad (June 18, 1904 – October 12, 1993) was an American electrical engineer and physicist notable for his pioneering work on nuclear reactors and development of proximity fuzes. In 1939, he created the first nuclear fission reaction in the United States.

== Biography ==
Hafstad was born in Minneapolis, Minnesota. He was the son of two Norwegian immigrants. He attended the University of Minnesota, graduating in electrical engineering in 1926. He had begun working with the Carnegie Institution for Science from 1928. In 1931, he earned the American Association for the Advancement of Science Prize for his research with Merle A. Tuve and Odd Dahl.

He was awarded his Ph.D. in physics at Johns Hopkins University in 1933. Between 1935 and 1939, he was a frequent participant at the Washington Conferences on Theoretical Physics sponsored by George Washington University and Carnegie Institute of Washington. Between 1946 and 1954, he was a professor of physics at Johns Hopkins University. From 1947-1949, he was director of the Johns Hopkins Applied Physics Laboratory. During that same period, he was executive secretary of the research and development board at the Department of Defense. From 1949 to 1955, he served as director of reactor development with the United States Atomic Energy Commission. In 1955, he became a vice president at the General Motors Corporation and was chief of its research laboratories. In 1968, Hafstad was elected to the National Academy of Engineering.

Hafstad died on October 12, 1993, at his home in the Oldwick section of Tewksbury Township, New Jersey.

== Honors and awards ==
- Medal of Merit of the United States Navy (1946)
- King's Medal in Defense of Freedom of the British Government (1946)

== Related Reading ==
- Castell, Lutz; Otfried Ischebeck (2013) Time, Quantum and Information (Springer Science & Business Media) ISBN 9783662105573
- Dahl, Per F. (2002) From Nuclear Transmutation to Nuclear Fission, 1932-1939 (CRC Press) ISBN 9781420034318
- Fernandez, Bernard; Georges Ripka (2012) Unravelling the Mystery of the Atomic Nucleus (Springer Science & Business Media) ISBN 9781461441809
- Mehra, Jagdish (2004) The Conceptual Completion and Extensions of Quantum Mechanics 1932-1941 (Springer Science & Business Media) ISBN 9780387218052
