= Katharine Clarke-Hafstad =

American climatologist

- Born: Katharine Bishop Clarke; December 6, 1903; Harbor Springs, Michigan, U.S.
- Died: May 15, 1996 (age 92); Harbor Springs, Michigan, U.S.
- Other name: Katharine Hafstad
- Occupations: Climatologist, army researcher, local official, clubwoman
- Spouse: Lawrence R. Hafstad

Katharine Bishop Clarke-Hafstad (December 6, 1903 – May 15, 1996) was an American geologist and climatologist. In the 1940s she was a researcher for the Soil Conservation Service. She was also an operations analyst for the United States Army, and a historian and researcher at the Operations Research Office of Johns Hopkins University. She was active in politics and community leadership in Michigan in her later years.

== Early life and education ==
Clarke was born in Harbor Springs, Michigan, the daughter of James Turner Clarke and Maud Bishop Clarke. Her father was in banking. She graduated from Northwestern University, and completed a master's degree in geography at Clark University in 1930. Her master's thesis was titled "Some Effects of the Atlantic Ocean Upon the Climate of Eastern U.S. Snowberry Farm Ski Lodge, RFD #2, Harbor Springs, MI".

== Career ==
Clarke worked on ocean temperatures at the Carnegie Institution in the 1930s. In the 1940s Clarke-Hafstad was a researcher for the United States Soil Conservation Service, working with C. W. Thornthwaite. Also in the 1940s, she was chair of the District of Columbia branch of the American Meteorological Society. In the 1950s she traveled to Japan and Korea as an operations analyst for the United States Army. She was a historian and researcher at the Operations Research Office at Johns Hopkins University. She was elected to membership in the Operations Research Society of America in 1954.

Hafstad returned to Michigan in the 1950s, and managed her family's ski lodge, Snowberry Farm Lodge. She was one of the first women to serve on the board of trustees at Central Michigan University, and chaired that board several times. She was chair of the West Traverse Township Planning Committee, chair of the board at Harbor Springs State Bank, chair of the Emmet Republican Committee, and a member of the Emmet County Board of Appeals. She was also a member of the American Association of University Women (AAUW), Zonta International, the Michigan Governor's Commission on the Status of Women, the Women's Federation of Michigan, and the Michigan Republican Central Committee.

Hafstad was a Michigan delegate to the Republican Women's Conference in Washington, D.C. in 1969, and at the 1976 Republican National Convention, held in Kansas City. She was also an alternate delegate at the 1964 Republican National Convention, held in San Francisco.

== Publications ==
Clarke-Hafstad's work was published in academic journals including Soil Conservation, Transactions of the American Society of CIvil Engineers, and Eos, Transactions of the American Geophysical Union.

- "American URSI broadcasts of cosmic data" (1933)
- "Changes in Atmospheric Circulation Result in Floods" (1937, with Benjamin Holzman)
- "A Statistical Method for Estimating the Reliability of a Station-Year Rainfall Record" (1938)
- "Reliability of Station-Year Rainfall-Frequency Determinations" (1942)
- "The spacing of rain-gages and the measurement of flood-producing rain" (1942)
- "Report of the Committee on Climatology, 1947–1948" (1949, with C. W. Thornthwaite, Erwin R. Biel, Phil E. Church, Woodrow C. Jacobs, Helmut Landsberg, and John B. Leighly)

== Personal life ==
Clarke married physicist Lawrence R. Hafstad in 1933. They divorced in 1939. She died in 1996, at the age of 92, at her home in Harbor Springs.
