= Oldwick Historic District =

Historic district in New Jersey, United States

- U.S. National Register of Historic Places
- U.S. Historic district
- New Jersey Register of Historic Places
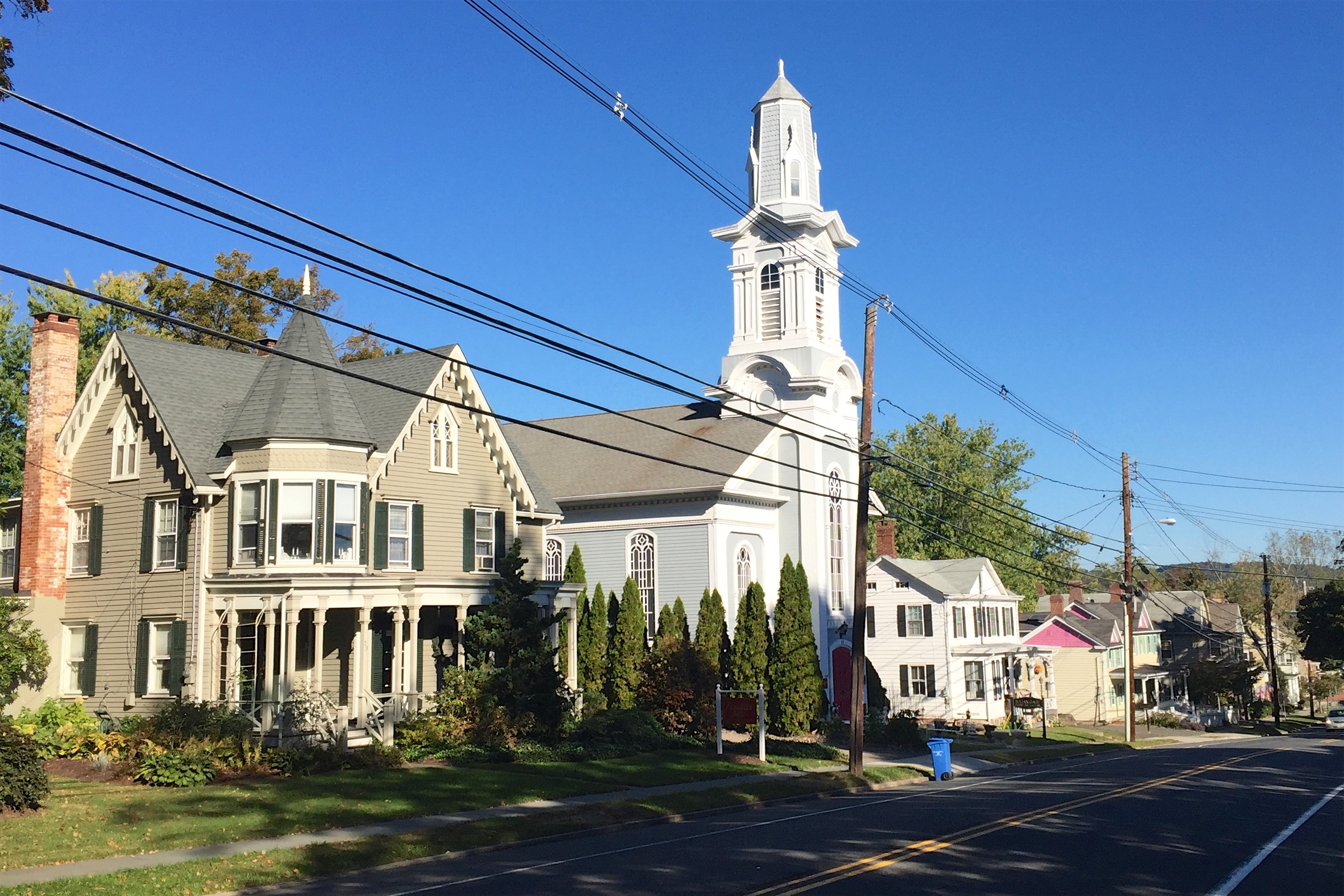
- Historic buildings, the Charles E. Dickerson House and the Oldwick Methodist Church, along Main Street, 2016

- Location within Hunterdon County, New Jersey Location within New Jersey Location within the United States
- Location: Roughly along County Route 517 (Main Street), Church, King, James, Joliet and William Streets; Oldwick, New Jersey
- Coordinates: 40°40′22″N 74°44′57″W
- Area: 170 acres (69 ha)
- Architectural style: Mid 19th Century Revival, Early Republic, Late Victorian
- NRHP reference No.: 88002153
- NJRHP No.: 1632

Significant dates
- Added to NRHP: November 14, 1988
- Designated NJRHP: June 2, 1986

The Oldwick Historic District is a 170-acre (69 ha) national historic district located along County Route 517 (Main Street), Church, King, James, Joliet and William streets in the Oldwick section of Tewksbury Township in Hunterdon County, New Jersey. The district was added to the National Register of Historic Places on November 14, 1988, for its significance in architecture, commerce, and industry. It includes 127 contributing buildings, 12 contributing structures, and one contributing site. The Kline Farmhouse, listed individually in 1984, also contributes to the district. Many of the buildings were documented by the Historic American Buildings Survey.

== History ==
In the 1740s, Ralph Smith bought land in the northern part of Oldwick. The Zion Lutheran Church was built in 1749 and remodeled in 1831 using vernacular Gothic/Greek Revival style. The Tewksbury Inn was built in 1800 with Colonial Revival embellishment. The Oldwick Methodist Church was built in 1865 with Romanesque Revival style.

== Gallery of contributing properties ==
Selected properties that are pivotal, that is, the most important to the district in terms of architecture or history, as described by the nomination form.

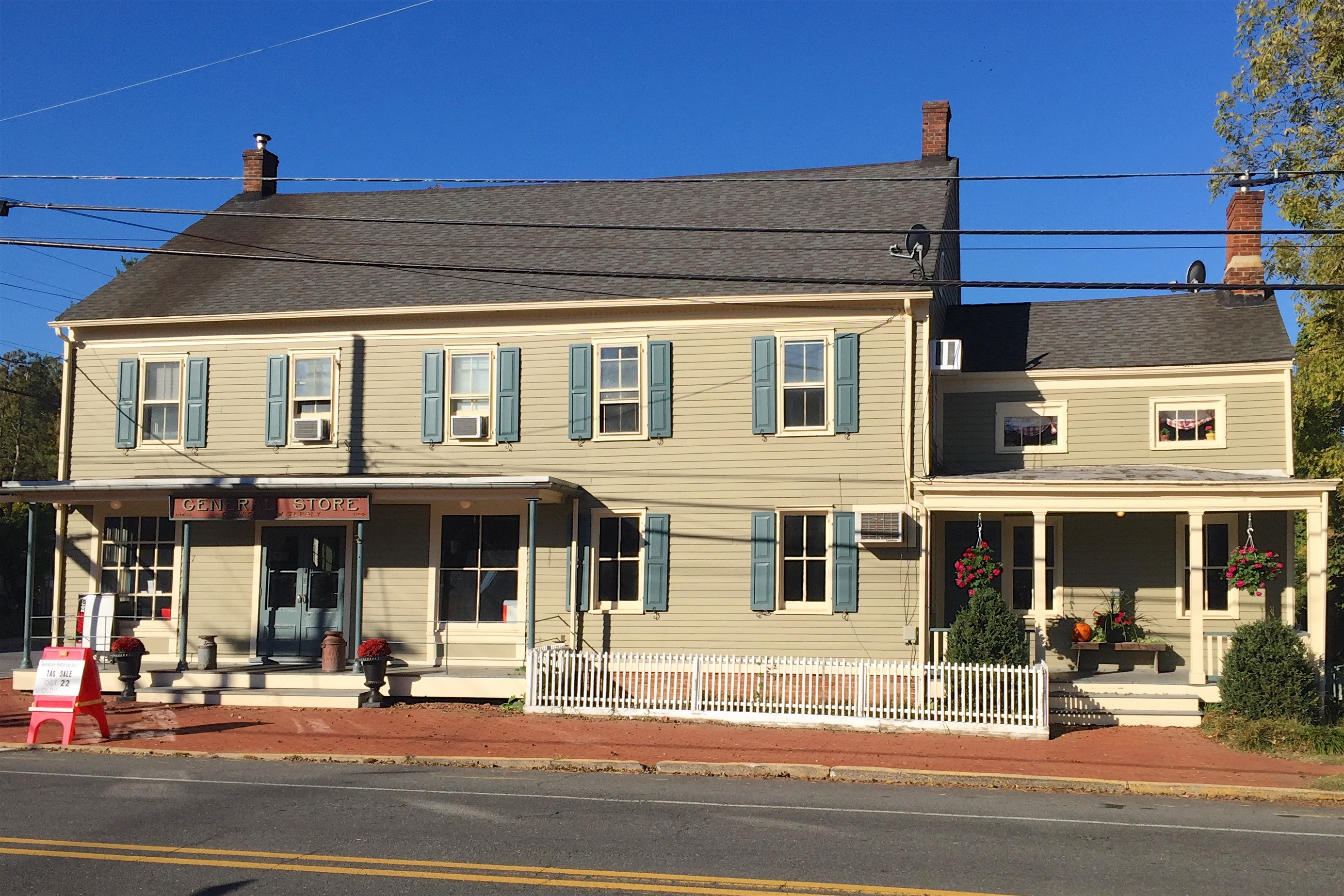
General Store

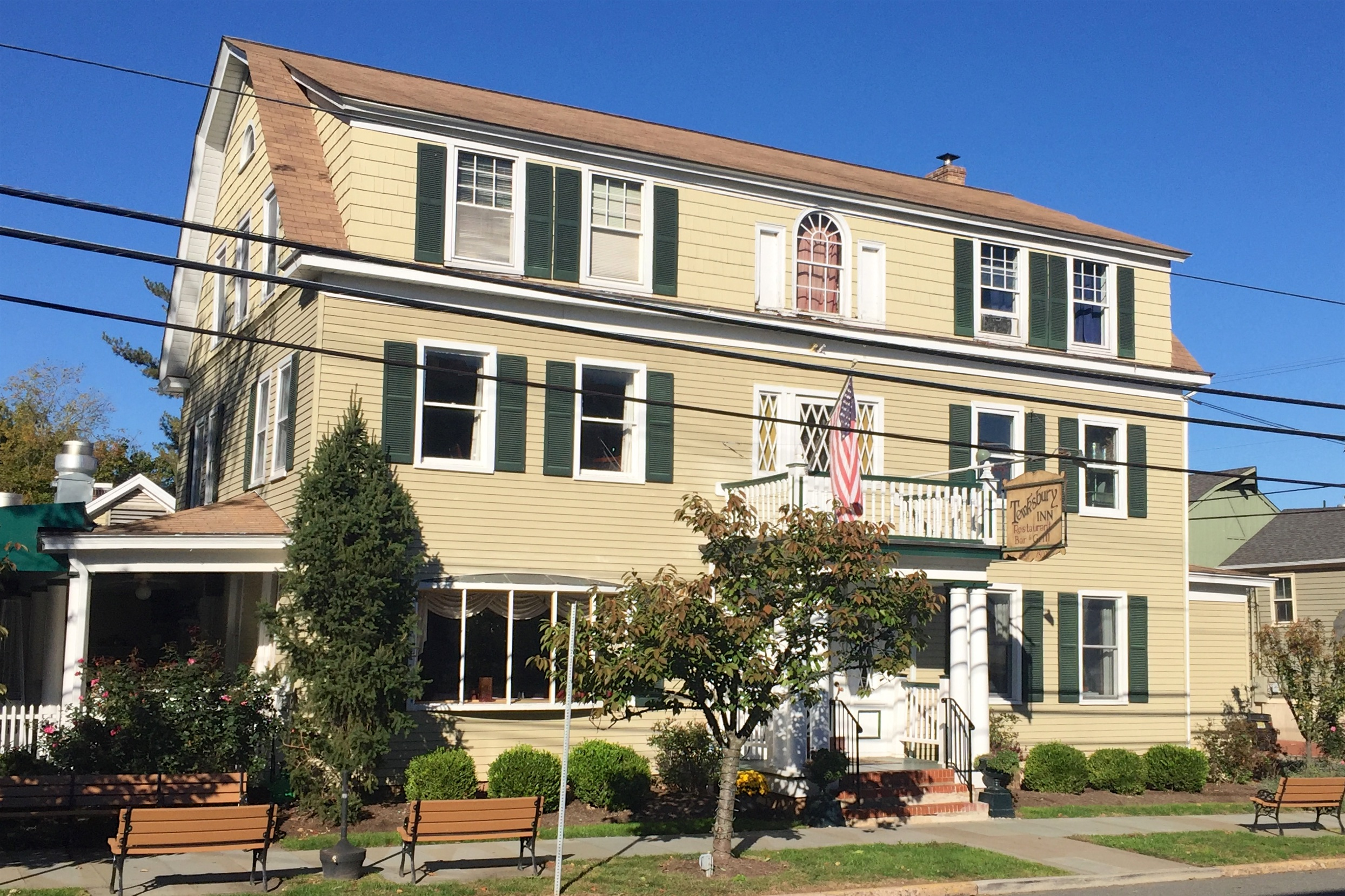
Tewksbury Inn

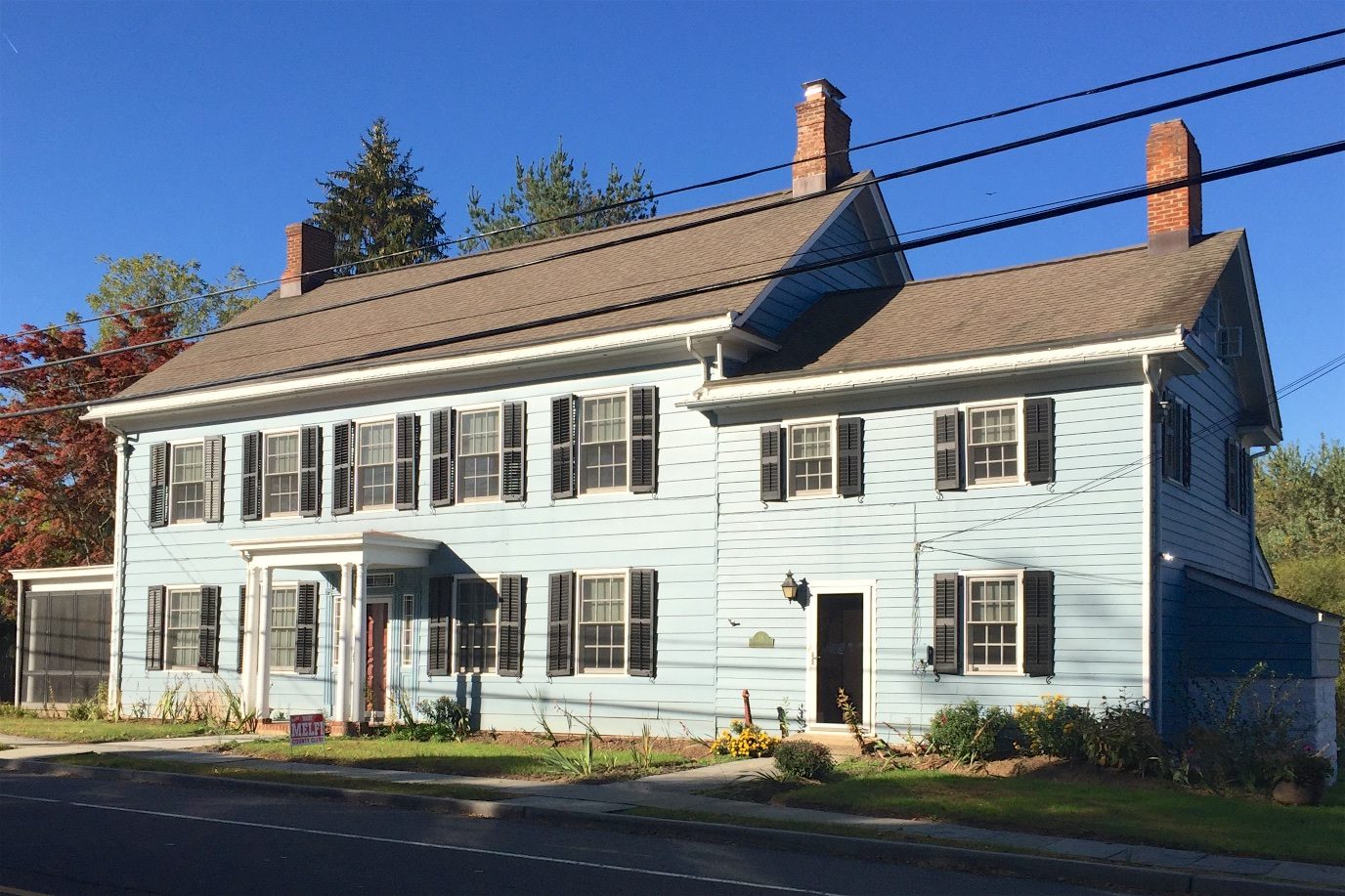
Van Doren House

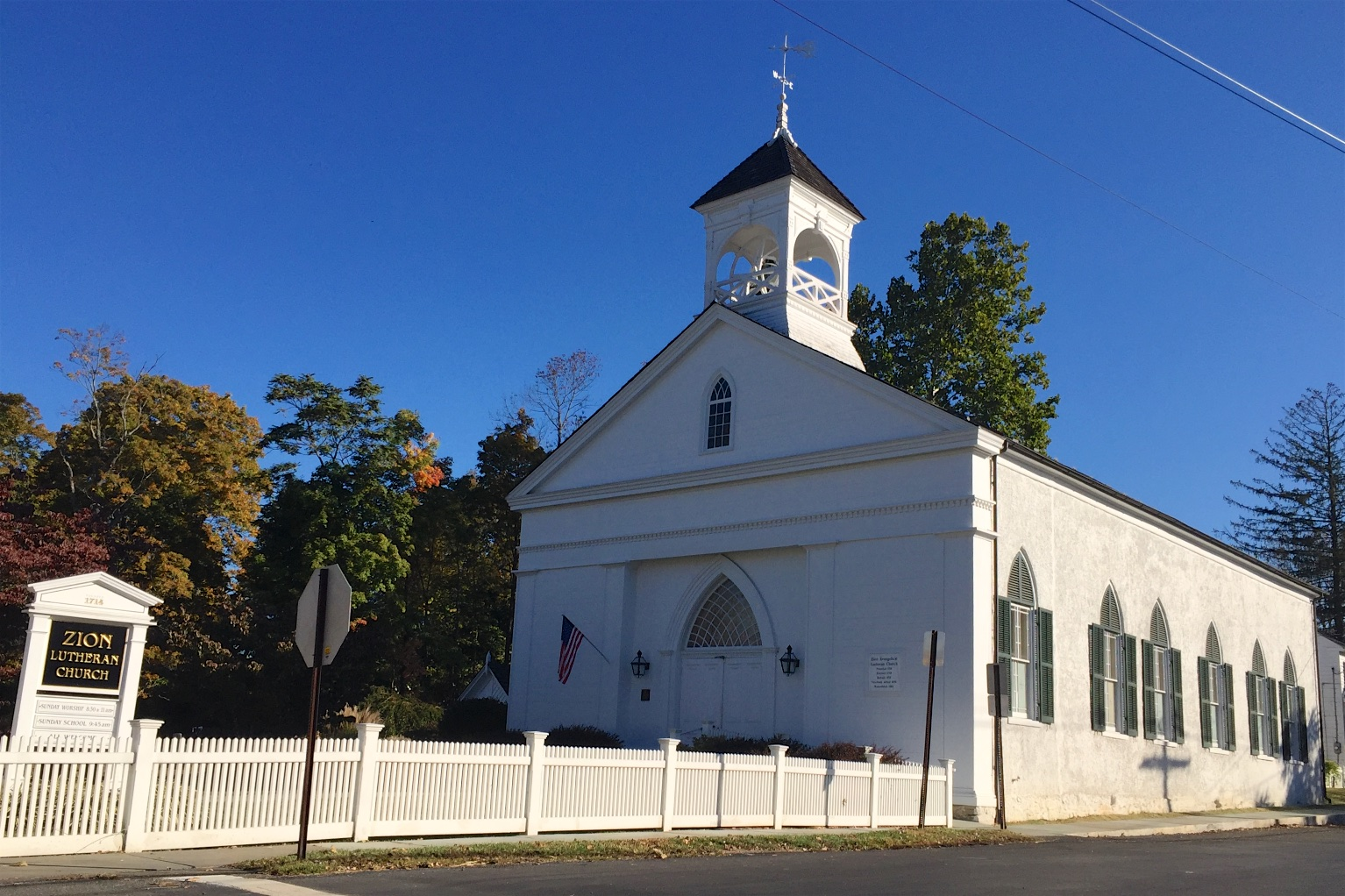
Zion Lutheran Church

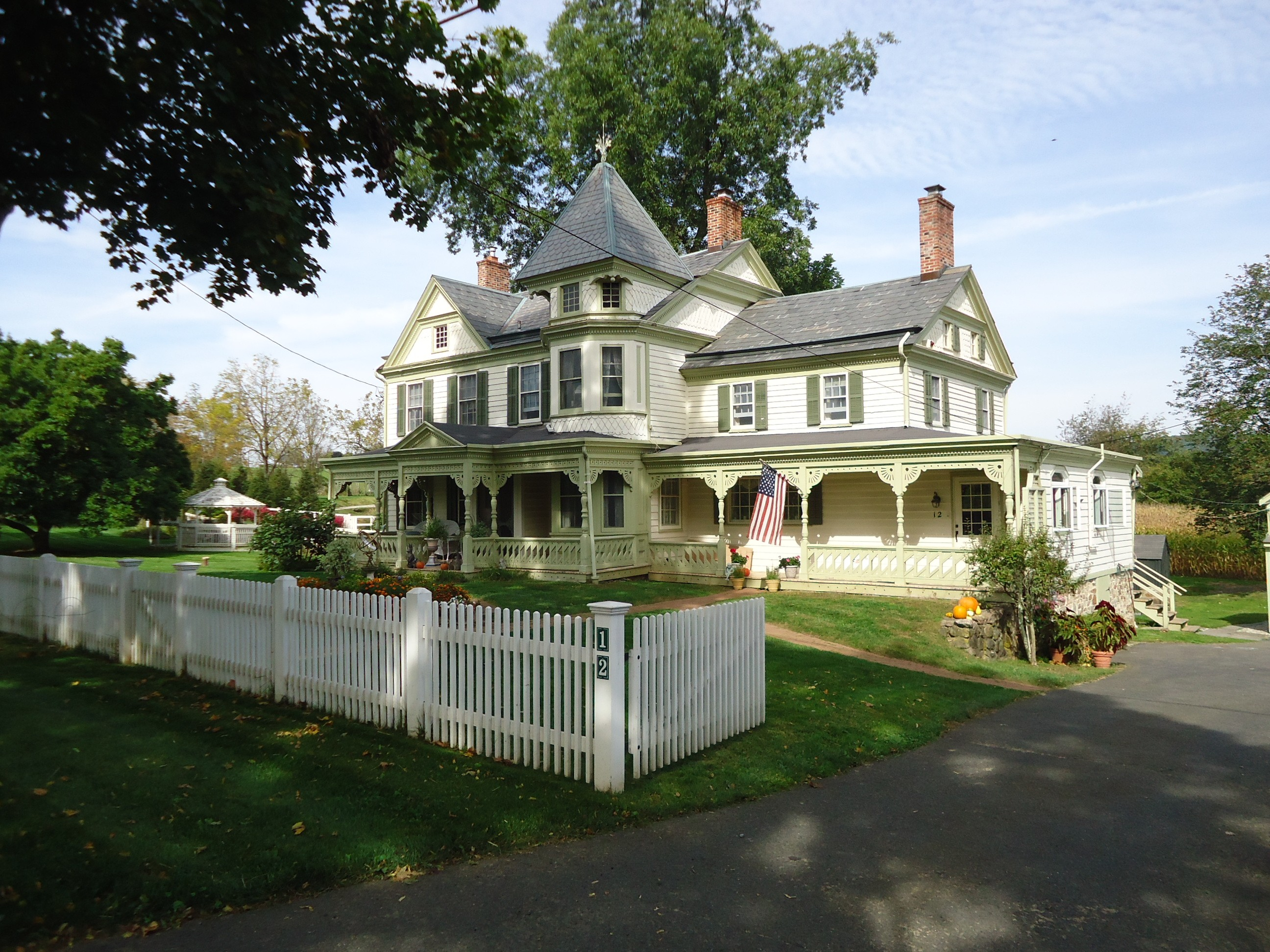
Queen Anne style house

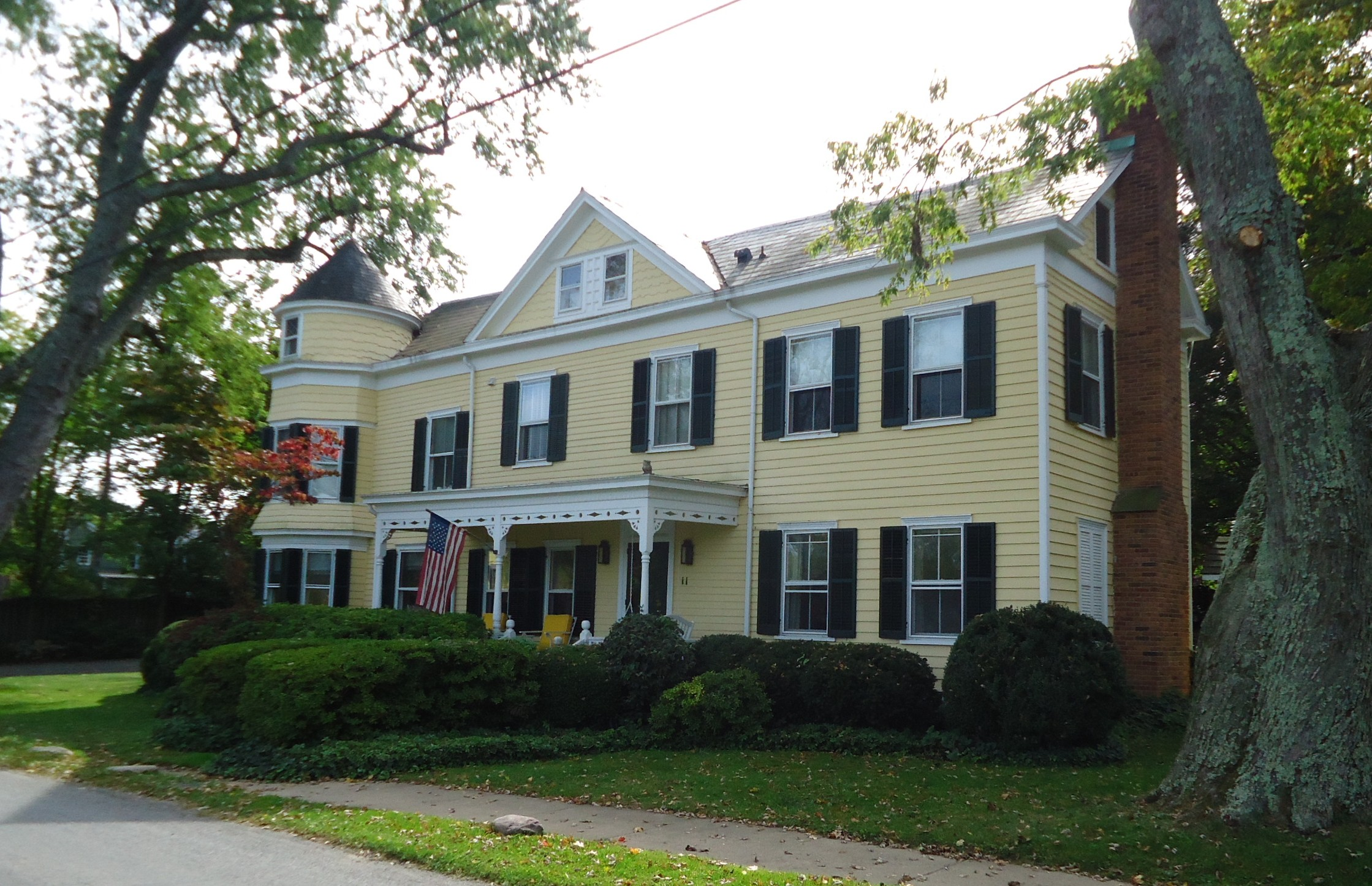
Victorian style house
