= Kate Whitman Annis =

American ice hockey executive

Personal information
- Born: Kate Russell Whitman c. 1977 (age 48–49)
- Home town: Oldwick, New Jersey, US
- Education: Solvay Brussels School; Wesleyan University
- Occupations: Ice hockey executive, coach
- Employer: Devils Youth Foundation
Ice hockey career
- Position: Defense
- Played for: Wesleyan Cardinals
- Playing career: 1994–1999

Kate Whitman Annis (born c. 1977) is an American ice hockey executive, currently serving as executive director of the Devils Youth Foundation, the youth outreach arm of the New Jersey Devils. She previously served as executive of operations for W Hockey Partners, the organization that oversees the league-owned teams in the Premier Hockey Federation (PHF).

== Career in ice hockey ==
Whitman Annis was a figure skater until age 12, at which point her father convinced her to give ice hockey a try. She attended Deerfield Academy, a boarding school in Deerfield, Massachusetts, for secondary school and played on the school's ice hockey team.

From 1995 to 1999, she played as a defenceman for the Wesleyan Cardinals women's ice hockey program. Across 94 NCAA Division III games, she scored 42 points.

While living abroad in Brussels from 2012 to 2015, she played ice hockey with the Jayhawks Leuven, a Flemish recreational team in Leuven, Belgium.

She has served as head coach of the girls' varsity ice hockey team at Pingry School since 2015.

=== Premier Hockey Federation ===
During the 2018–19 NWHL season, Whitman Annis served as an assistant coach for the Metropolitan Riveters in the Premier Hockey Federation (PHF). In April 2019, she was named Riveters general manager, the fifth female general manager in PHF history and the first woman to be named to the position after the league spent two years without any team having official general manager. After the team improved its position to third in the league in the 2019–20 season, she received praise for her role in the team's rebuild.

As the PHF did not hold a draft in 2019, the 2020 Draft was Whitman Annis' first at the helm of the Riveters. With the fourth overall pick, she selected defenceman Saroya Tinker. Other players selected by Whitman Annis at the draft included Delaney Belinskas at tenth, Tera Hofmann at sixteenth, and Bridgette Prentiss at twenty-first.

In 2021, she was named the replacement for league founder Dani Rylan as the director of operations for W Hockey Partners, the organization that oversees the league-owned teams in the PHF: the Buffalo Beauts, Connecticut Whale, Metropolitan Riveters, and Minnesota Whitecaps. Anya Packer was named as her replacement as general manager of the Riveters.

== Personal life ==
Whitman Annis is the daughter of former Governor of New Jersey Christine Todd Whitman. She was raised in Far Hills, New Jersey, and later relocated with her family to the Oldwick community of Tewksbury Township.

Whitman Annis holds a bachelor's degree in political science from Wesleyan University and an MBA from the Solvay Brussels School of Economics and Management of the Université libre de Bruxelles.

In 2008, she unsuccessfully ran as a Republican for Mike Ferguson's vacated seat in the US House of Representatives. She ran for one of the two seats on the Peapack-Gladstone borough council in 2009, but finished with 30% of the vote in the three-way race, losing by 55 and 59 votes respectively.

Whitman married Craig Annis, a lobbyist, at a 2003 ceremony in Bedminster, New Jersey. They have four sons, twins born in 2005 and two younger boys, all of whom play ice hockey.
