= Tewksbury Township, New Jersey =

Township in Hunterdon County, New Jersey, US

- Township
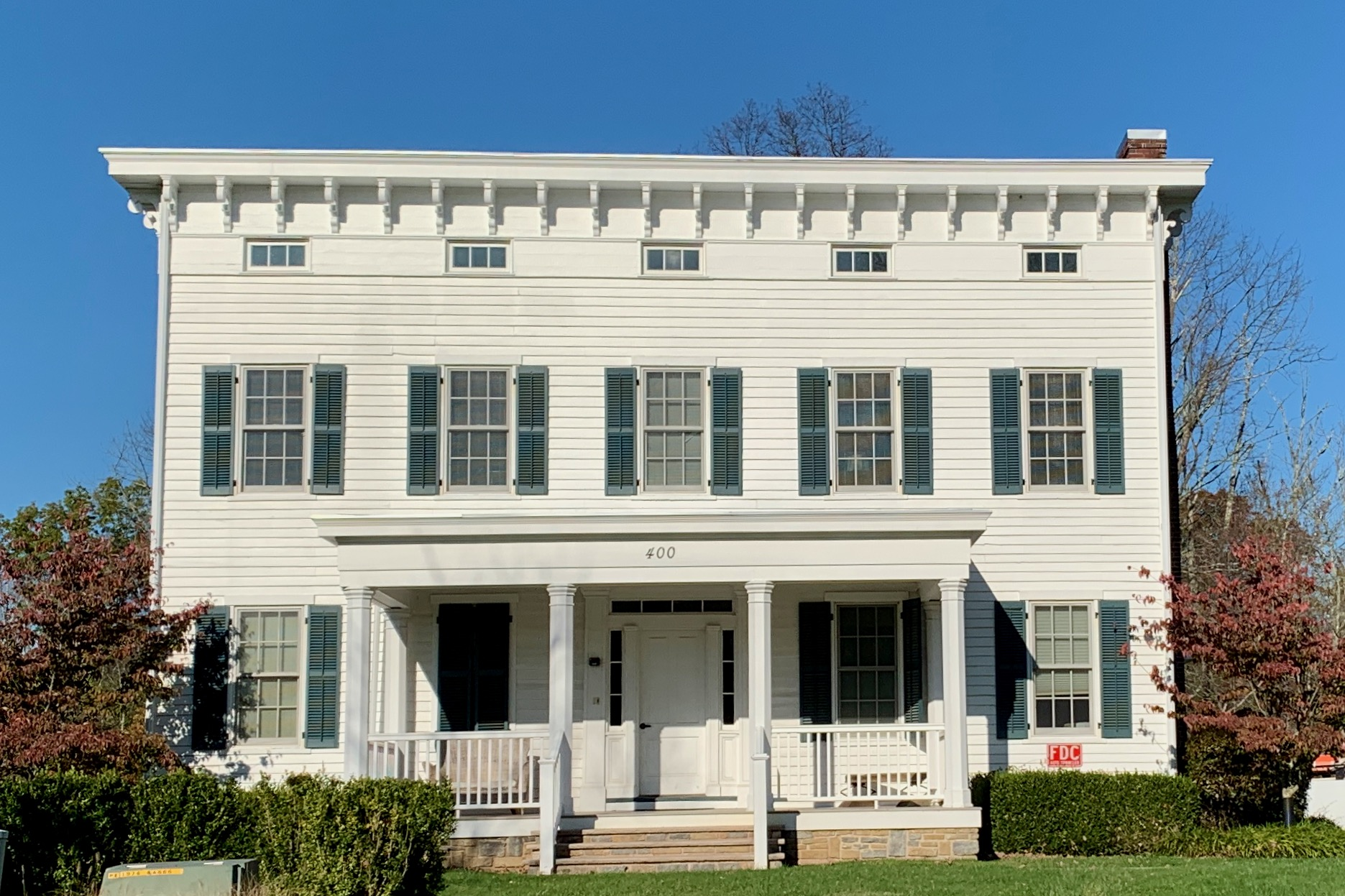
- Bartles House on Oldwick Road

- Seal

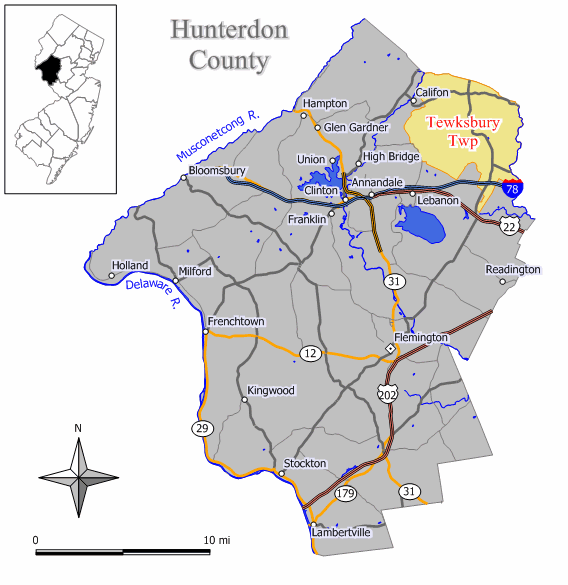
- Location of Tewksbury Township in Hunterdon County highlighted in yellow (right). Inset map: Location of Hunterdon County in New Jersey highlighted in black (left).

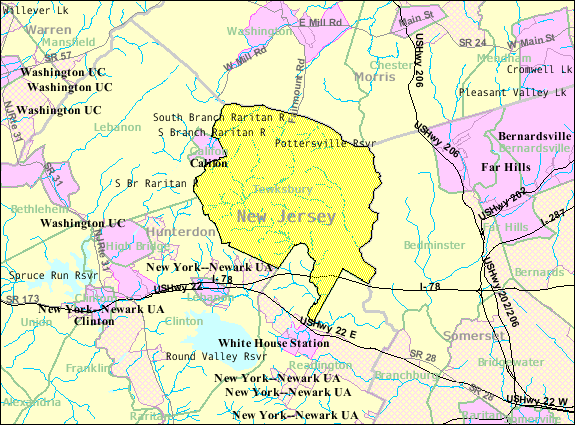
- Census Bureau map of Tewksbury Township, New Jersey

- Location in Hunterdon County Location in New Jersey Location in the United States
- Coordinates: 40.690169°N 74.771685°W
- Country: United States
- State: New Jersey
- County: Hunterdon
- Incorporated: February 21, 1798
- Named for: Tewkesbury, England

Government
  - Type: Township
  - Body: Township Committee
  - Mayor: Jean Frankel (I, term ends December 31, 2023)
  - Administrator: Shana Goodchild
  - Municipal clerk: Jennifer Ader

Area
  - Total: 31.78 sq mi (82.30 km^{2})
  - Land: 31.64 sq mi (81.96 km^{2})
  - Water: 0.13 sq mi (0.34 km^{2}) 0.41%
  - Rank: 79th of 565 in state 6th of 26 in county
- Elevation: 751 ft (229 m)

Population (2020)
  - Total: 5,870
  - Estimate (2023): 5,887
  - Rank: 354th of 565 in state 6th of 26 in county
  - Density: 185.5/sq mi (71.6/km^{2})
  - Rank: 510th of 565 in state 19th of 26 in county
- Time zone: UTC−05:00 (Eastern (EST))
  - Summer (DST): UTC−04:00 (Eastern (EDT))
- ZIP Code: 07830 – Califon, 08833 – Lebanon
- Area code: 908
- FIPS code: 3401972510
- GNIS feature ID: 0882190
- Website: www.tewksburytwp.net

Tewksbury Township is a township located in Hunterdon County, in the U.S. state of New Jersey and is located within the New York Metropolitan Area. As of the 2020 United States census, the township's population was 5,870, a decrease of 123 (−2.1%) from the 2010 census count of 5,993, which in turn reflected an increase of 452 (+8.2%) from the 5,541 counted in the 2000 census.

The township has been one of the state's highest-income communities. Based on data from the 2012–2016 American Community Survey (ACS), NJ.com ranked the township as having the fifth-highest income in the state, with a median household income of $173,473. Based on data from the 2014–2018 ACS, the township residents had a median household income of $162,037, more than double the statewide median of $79,363.

Located within the Raritan Valley region, Tewksbury is situated in northeastern Hunterdon County bordering both Morris and Somerset (along the Lamington River) counties. The township's name is thought to be from Tewkesbury, England. Since 2003, the two communities have been twinned.

== History ==
The area was originally settled by the Lenape Native Americans. European settlement began in 1708, when George Willocks acquired land from the Lenape in the area, followed by an acquisition by the proprietors of West Jersey of a tract covering 100,000 acres (160 mi^{2}; 400 km^{2}).

The township was first mentioned as holding a township meeting on March 11, 1755, as having been formed partly from Lebanon Township, though the exact circumstances of its formation by charter are unknown. Tewksbury was incorporated as one of New Jersey's initial 104 townships by an act of the New Jersey Legislature on February 21, 1798. Portions of the township were taken to form Califon borough (April 2, 1898). Portions of the township were acquired from Readington Township in 1832 and 1861, and portions were transferred to Clinton Township in 1871 and 1891.

The earliest European settlers were of English extraction and were followed by a large German contingent who began to settle in the area around 1749 and became the strongest influence around the time Tewksbury became a township. Their community was known as New Germantown, a name that survived until World War I when prejudice against Germans led residents to change the community's name to Oldwick. The more than 100 structures and its mixture of Victorian, Federal, New England and Georgian style homes in Oldwick is protected by its listing on the National Register of Historic Places. Established in 1714 and granted a Royal Charter in 1767, Zion Lutheran Church in Oldwick is the oldest German Lutheran parish in New Jersey.

Oldwick is home to Mane Stream, a Professional Association of Therapeutic Horsemanship (PATH) Premier Accredited Center for therapeutic horseback riding.

On April 5, 2024, the township was the epicenter of the 2024 New Jersey earthquake, a magnitude 4.8 earthquake that was felt throughout the Northeastern United States including New York City and Philadelphia.

== Geography ==
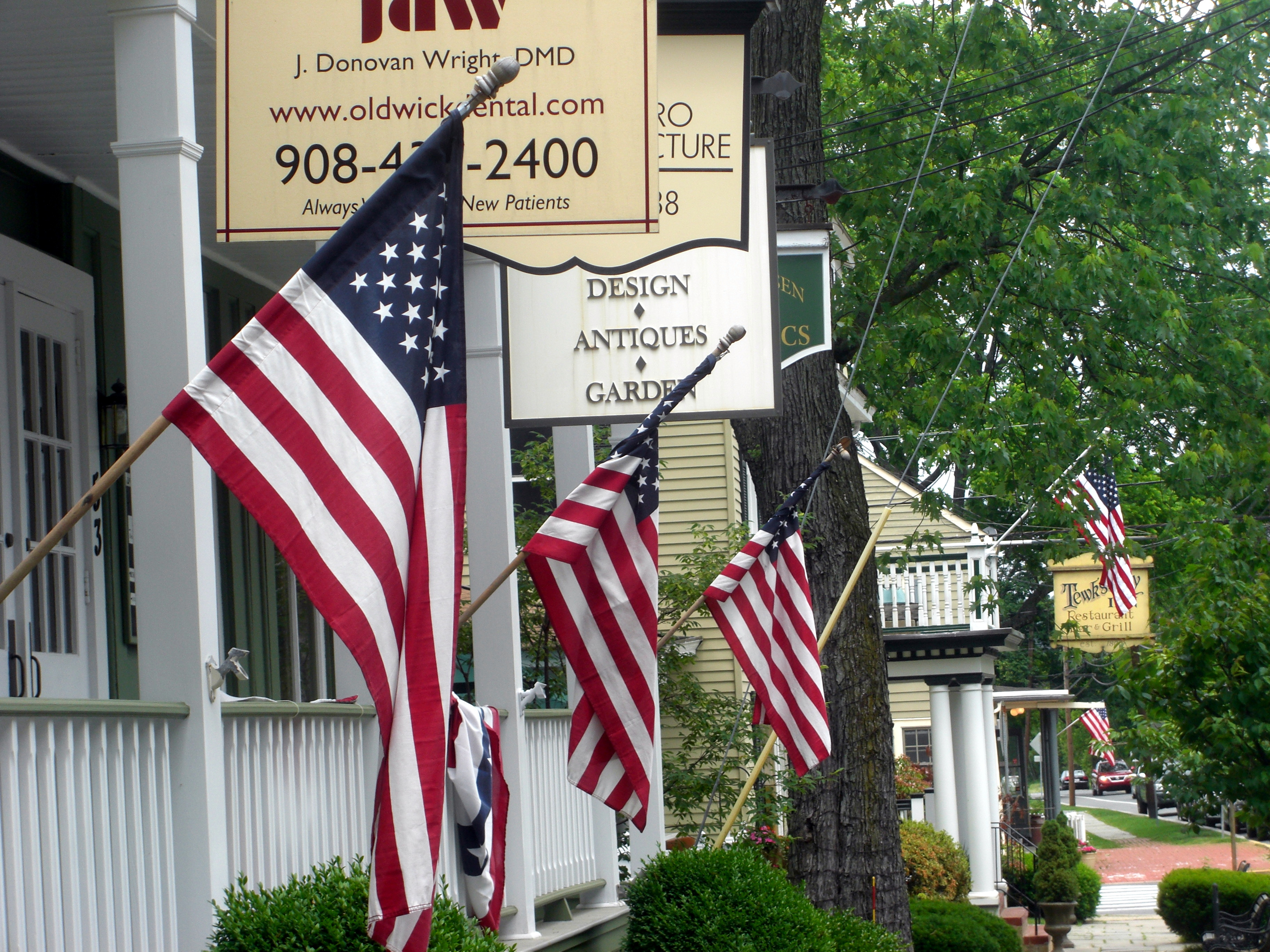
Oldwick Center

According to the United States Census Bureau, the township had a total area of 31.78 square miles (82.3 km^{2}), including 31.65 square miles (82.0 km^{2}) of land and 0.13 square miles (0.34 km^{2}) of water (0.41%).

Tewksbury Township borders Califon, Clinton Township, Lebanon Township and Readington Township in Hunterdon County; Chester Township and Washington Township in Morris County; and Bedminster Township in Somerset County.

Unincorporated communities, localities and place names located partially or completely within the township include Apgar's Corner, Bissell, Cokesbury (located on the order of Tewksbury Township and Clinton Tonwship), Fairmount, Farmersville, Fox Hill, Laurel Farms, Lower Fairmount, Mountainville, New Germantown, Oldwick, Pottersville (split between Tewksbury Township and Bedminster), Sutton and Vernoy.

== Demographics ==
Historical population
Census	Pop.	Note	%±
1810	1,308		—
1820	1,490		13.9%
1830	1,659		11.3%
1840	1,944		17.2%
1850	2,301		18.4%
1860	2,333		1.4%
1870	2,327		−0.3%
1880	2,108		−9.4%
1890	2,034		−3.5%
1900	1,883	*	−7.4%
1910	1,742		−7.5%
1920	1,279		−26.6%
1930	1,119		−12.5%
1940	1,200		7.2%
1950	1,439		19.9%
1960	1,908		32.6%
1970	2,959		55.1%
1980	4,094		38.4%
1990	4,803		17.3%
2000	5,541		15.4%
2010	5,993		8.2%
2020	5,870		−2.1%
2023 (est.)	5,887		0.3%
Population sources: 1810–1920 1840; 1850–1870 1850 1870; 1880–1890 1890–1910; 1910–1930 1940–2000; 2000 2010 2020 * = Lost territory in previous decade.

=== 2010 census ===
The 2010 United States census counted 5,993 people, 2,189 households, and 1,769 families in the township. The population density was 190.1 per square mile (73.4/km^{2}). There were 2,323 housing units at an average density of 73.7 per square mile (28.5/km^{2}). The racial makeup was 94.16% (5,643) White, 0.83% (50) Black or African American, 0.03% (2) Native American, 2.92% (175) Asian, 0.00% (0) Pacific Islander, 0.82% (49) from other races, and 1.23% (74) from two or more races. Hispanic or Latino of any race were 3.49% (209) of the population.

Of the 2,189 households, 34.9% had children under the age of 18; 73.0% were married couples living together; 5.5% had a female householder with no husband present and 19.2% were non-families. Of all households, 15.3% were made up of individuals and 6.9% had someone living alone who was 65 years of age or older. The average household size was 2.74 and the average family size was 3.05.

25.3% of the population were under the age of 18, 4.7% from 18 to 24, 15.2% from 25 to 44, 38.5% from 45 to 64, and 16.3% who were 65 years of age or older. The median age was 47.3 years. For every 100 females, the population had 97.5 males. For every 100 females ages 18 and older there were 96.7 males.

The Census Bureau's 2006–2010 American Community Survey showed that (in 2010 inflation-adjusted dollars) median household income was $160,224 (with a margin of error of +/− $13,609) and the median family income was $189,833 (+/− $21,901). Males had a median income of $128,177 (+/− $22,406) versus $90,833 (+/− $32,868) for females. The per capita income for the borough was $91,644 (+/− $13,544). About 0.9% of families and 1.2% of the population were below the poverty line, including 1.3% of those under age 18 and 1.9% of those age 65 or over.

=== 2000 census ===
As of the 2000 United States census there were 5,541 people, 1,986 households, and 1,662 families residing in the township. The population density was 175.2 inhabitants per square mile (67.6/km^{2}). There were 2,052 housing units at an average density of 64.9 per square mile (25.1/km^{2}). The racial makeup of the township was 96.82% White, 0.52% African American, 1.88% Asian, 0.27% from other races, and 0.51% from two or more races. Hispanic or Latino of any race were 1.53% of the population.

There were 1,996 households, out of which 36.6% had children under the age of 18 living with them, 77.2% were married couples living together, 5.1% had a female householder with no husband present, and 16.3% were non-families. 12.5% of all households were made up of individuals, and 4.5% had someone living alone who was 65 years of age or older. The average household size was 2.79 and the average family size was 3.05.

In the township the population was spread out, with 26.2% under the age of 18, 3.6% from 18 to 24, 25.2% from 25 to 44, 33.7% from 45 to 64, and 11.2% who were 65 years of age or older. The median age was 43 years. For every 100 females, there were 97.0 males. For every 100 females age 18 and over, there were 96.7 males.

The median income for a household in the township was $135,649, and the median income for a family was $150,189. Males had a median income of $100,000 versus $57,500 for females. The per capita income for the township was $65,470. About 1.6% of families and 2.7% of the population were below the poverty line, including 3.9% of those under age 18 and 1.5% of those age 65 or over.

== Parks and recreation ==
Tewksbury Township hosts part of a rail trail that was created out of the former Central Railroad of New Jersey High Bridge Branch. The trail is maintained by Hunterdon County Parks and Recreation and is called the Columbia Trail, which includes a scenic area known as the Ken Lockwood Gorge.

== Government ==
=== Local government ===
Tewksbury Township is governed under the Township form of government, one of 141 municipalities (of the 564) statewide governed under this form. The Township Committee is comprised of five members, who are elected directly by the voters at-large in partisan elections to serve three-year terms of office on a staggered basis, with either one or two seats coming up for election each year as part of the November general election in a three-year cycle. At an annual reorganization meeting held in January, the Township Committee selects one of its members to serve as Mayor and another as Deputy Mayor, each serving a one-year term.

As of 2023, members of the Tewksbury Township Committee are Mayor Jean Frankel (I, term on township committee and as mayor ends December 31, 2023), Deputy Mayor William J. Voyce (R, term on committee ends 2025; term as deputy mayor ends 2023), Dana D. Desiderio (R, 2024), Andrea B. Maranca (R, 2025) and Peter L. Melick (R, 2024).

In 2018, the township had an average property tax bill of $14,367, the highest in the county, compared to an average bill of $8,767 statewide.

=== Federal, state and county representation ===
Tewksbury Township is located in the 7th Congressional District and is part of New Jersey's 23rd state legislative district.

For the 119th United States Congress, New Jersey's 7th congressional district is represented by Thomas Kean Jr. (R, Westfield). New Jersey is represented in the United States Senate by Democrats Cory Booker (Newark, term ends 2027) and Andy Kim (Moorestown, term ends 2031).

For the 2026–2027 session, the 23rd legislative district of the New Jersey Legislature is represented in the State Senate by Doug Steinhardt (R, Lopatcong Township) and in the General Assembly by John DiMaio (R, Hackettstown) and Erik Peterson (R, Franklin Township).

Hunterdon County is governed by a Board of County Commissioners comprised of five members who are elected at-large on a partisan basis to serve three-year terms of office on a staggered basis, with either one or two seats up for election each year as part of the November general election. At an annual reorganization meeting held each January, the commissioners select one member to serve as the board's Director and another to serve as Deputy Director, each for a one-year term. As of 2025, Hunterdon County's Commissioners are Director John E. Lanza (R; Raritan Township, 2025), Deputy Director Shaun C. Van Doren (R; Tewksbury Township, 2026), Jeff Kuhl (R; Raritan Township, 2027), Zachary T. Rich (R; West Amwell Township, 2025) and Susan Soloway (R; Franklin Township, 2027).

Constitutional officers elected on a countywide basis are Clerk Mary H. Melfi (R; Flemington, 2026), Sheriff Fredrick W. Brown (R; Alexandria Township, 2025) and Surrogate Heidi Rohrbach (R; Lebanon Township, 2028).

=== Politics ===
As of March 2011, there were a total of 4,425 registered voters in Tewksbury Township, of which 699 (15.8%) were registered as Democrats, 2,310 (52.2%) were registered as Republicans and 1,412 (31.9%) were registered as Unaffiliated. There were 4 voters registered as Libertarians or Greens.

Gubernatorial election results for Tewksbury Township
Year	Republican		Democratic		Third party(ies)	
Year	No.	%	No.	%	No.	%
2025	1,886	55.50%	1,494	43.97%	18	0.53%
2021	1,804	62.16%	1,082	37.28%	16	0.55%
2017	1,493	63.75%	815	34.80%	34	1.45%
2013	1,706	77.83%	445	20.30%	41	1.87%
2009	1,982	67.53%	638	21.74%	315	10.73%
2005	1,611	70.20%	637	27.76%	47	2.05%

In the 2024 presidential election, Republican Donald Trump received 53.3% (2,169 votes) of the vote, compared to 44.4% (1,807 votes) for Democrat Kamala Harris and 2.3% (93 votes) for all other candidates. In the 2020 presidential election, Republican Donald Trump received 52.9% (2,245 votes) of the vote, compared to 45.6% (1,931 votes) for Joe Biden and 1.4% (61 votes) for all other candidates. In the 2016 presidential election, Republican Donald Trump received 57.6% (2,109 votes) of the vote, compared to 38.3% (1,402 votes) for Hillary Rodham Clinton and 4.1% (151 votes) for all other candidates. In the 2012 presidential election, Republican Mitt Romney received 66.6% of the vote (2,291 cast), ahead of Democrat Barack Obama with 32.0% (1,100 votes), and other candidates with 1.5% (51 votes), among the 3,478 ballots cast by the township's 4,628 registered voters (36 ballots were spoiled), for a turnout of 75.2%. In the 2008 presidential election, Republican John McCain received 60.7% of the vote (2,280 cast), ahead of Democrat Barack Obama with 37.4% (1,403 votes) and other candidates with 1.0% (39 votes), among the 3,754 ballots cast by the township's 4,502 registered voters, for a turnout of 83.4%. In the 2004 presidential election, Republican George W. Bush received 66.7% of the vote (2,321 ballots cast), outpolling Democrat John Kerry with 33.2% (1,156 votes) and other candidates with 0.6% (25 votes), among the 3,480 ballots cast by the township's 4,171 registered voters, for a turnout percentage of 83.4.

United States presidential election results for Tewksbury Township
Year	Republican		Democratic		Third party(ies)	
Year	No.	%	No.	%	No.	%
2024	2,169	53.31%	1,807	44.41%	93	2.29%
2020	2,245	52.99%	1,931	45.57%	61	1.44%
2016	2,109	57.59%	1,402	38.29%	151	4.12%
2012	2,291	66.56%	1,100	31.96%	51	1.48%
2008	2,280	61.26%	1,403	37.69%	39	1.05%
2004	2,321	66.28%	1,156	33.01%	25	0.71%

In the 2013 gubernatorial election, Republican Chris Christie received 77.8% of the vote (1,706 cast), ahead of Democrat Barbara Buono with 20.3% (445 votes), and other candidates with 1.9% (41 votes), among the 2,238 ballots cast by the township's 4,551 registered voters (46 ballots were spoiled), for a turnout of 49.2%. In the 2009 gubernatorial election, Republican Chris Christie received 66.7% of the vote (1,982 ballots cast), ahead of Democrat Jon Corzine with 21.5% (638 votes), Independent Chris Daggett with 10.4% (310 votes) and other candidates with 0.2% (5 votes), among the 2,971 ballots cast by the township's 4,434 registered voters, yielding a 67.0% turnout.

United States Senate election results for Tewksbury Township1
Year	Republican		Democratic		Third party(ies)	
Year	No.	%	No.	%	No.	%
2024	2,163	55.19%	1,679	42.84%	77	1.96%
2018	2,025	61.35%	1,214	36.78%	62	1.88%
2012	2,168	66.04%	1,020	31.07%	95	2.89%
2006	1,723	66.91%	801	31.11%	51	1.98%

United States Senate election results for Tewksbury Township2
Year	Republican		Democratic		Third party(ies)	
Year	No.	%	No.	%	No.	%
2020	2,363	56.25%	1,753	41.73%	85	2.02%
2014	1,271	66.27%	614	32.01%	33	1.72%
2013	1,133	66.30%	568	33.24%	8	0.47%
2008	2,444	68.86%	1,033	29.11%	72	2.03%

== Education ==
The Tewksbury Township Schools is a public school district, which serves students in pre-kindergarten through eighth grade. The district and its schools are all located in Tewksbury Township, but have mailing addresses in Califon. AsSchools in the district (with 2023–24 enrollment data from the National Center for Education Statistics) are Tewksbury Elementary School with 260 students in grades PreK–4 and Old Turnpike School with 223 students in grades 5–8.

Public school students in ninth through twelfth grades attend Voorhees High School in Lebanon Township (although the mailing address is Glen Gardner), which also serves students from Califon, Glen Gardner, Hampton, High Bridge and Lebanon Township. As of the 2023–24 school year, the high school had an enrollment of 753 students and 73.9 classroom teachers (on an FTE basis), for a student–teacher ratio of 10.2:1. The school is part of the North Hunterdon-Voorhees Regional High School District, which also includes students from Bethlehem Township, Clinton Town, Clinton Township, Franklin Township, Lebanon Borough and Union Township who attend North Hunterdon High School in Annandale.

Eighth grade students from all of Hunterdon County are eligible to apply to attend the high school programs offered by the Hunterdon County Vocational School District, a county-wide vocational school district that offers career and technical education at its campuses in Raritan Township and at programs sited at local high schools, with no tuition charged to students for attendance.

== Historic district ==
The Oldwick Historic District is a 170-acre (69 ha) national historic district located along County Route 517 (Main Street), Church, King, James, Joliet and William streets in the historic Oldwick neighborhood of Tewksbury Township.

The community has been settled since the 1740s, when Ralph Smith bought land in the northern part of Oldwick. The construction of the Zion Lutheran Church in 1749 (remodeled in 1831) is a fixture of the community, as it utilizes the architectural style of vernacular Gothic/Greek revival. Other notable properties include the Tewksbury Inn (built in 1800 in the Colonial Revival architectural style) and the Oldwick Methodist Church (built in 1865 in the Romanesque architectural style).

The district was added to the National Register of Historic Places on November 14, 1988, for its significance in architecture, commerce, and industry, and has a total of 127 contributing buildings, 12 contributing structures, and one contributing site. Many of the buildings were documented by the Historic American Buildings Survey.

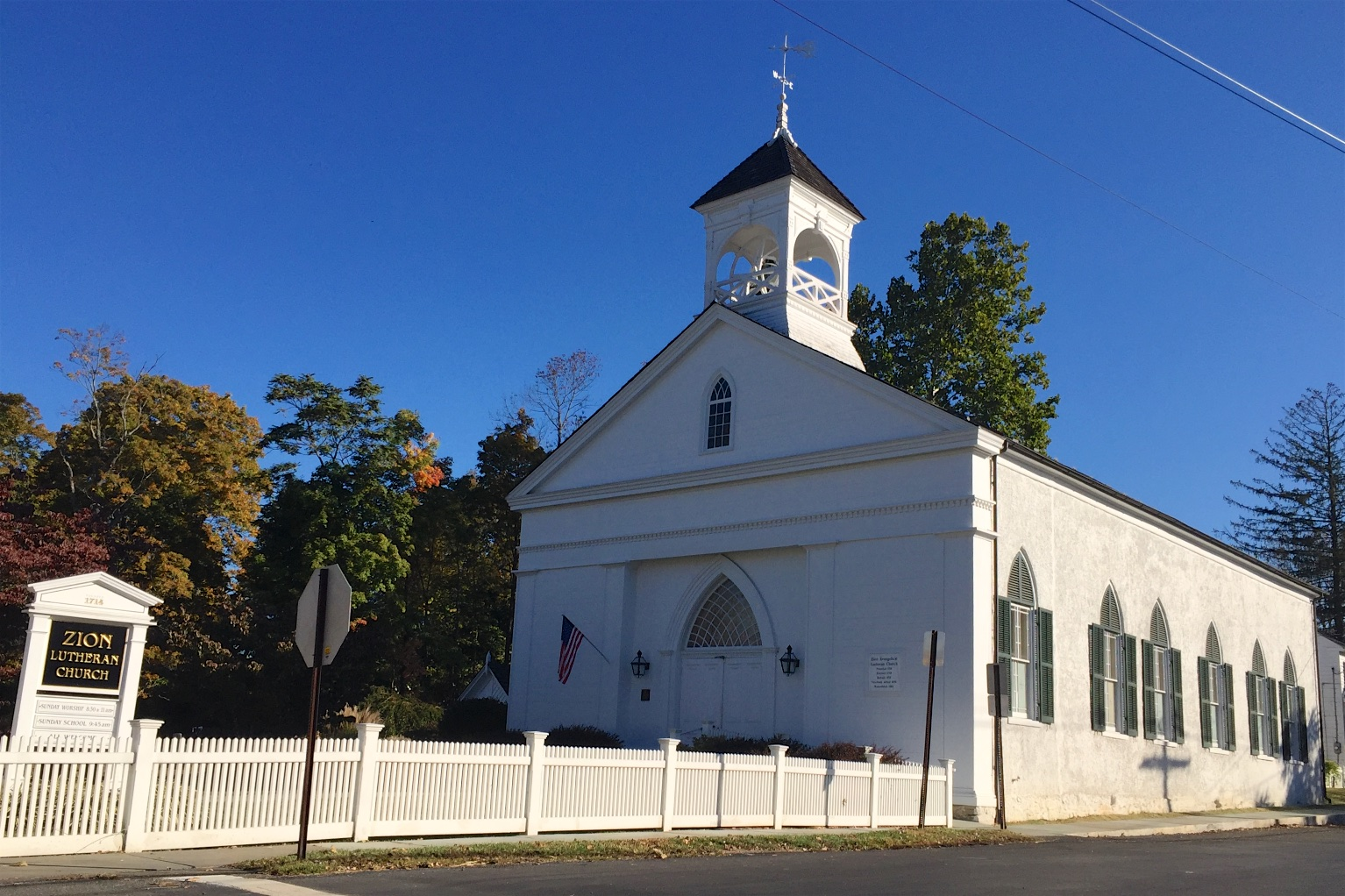
Zion Lutheran Church

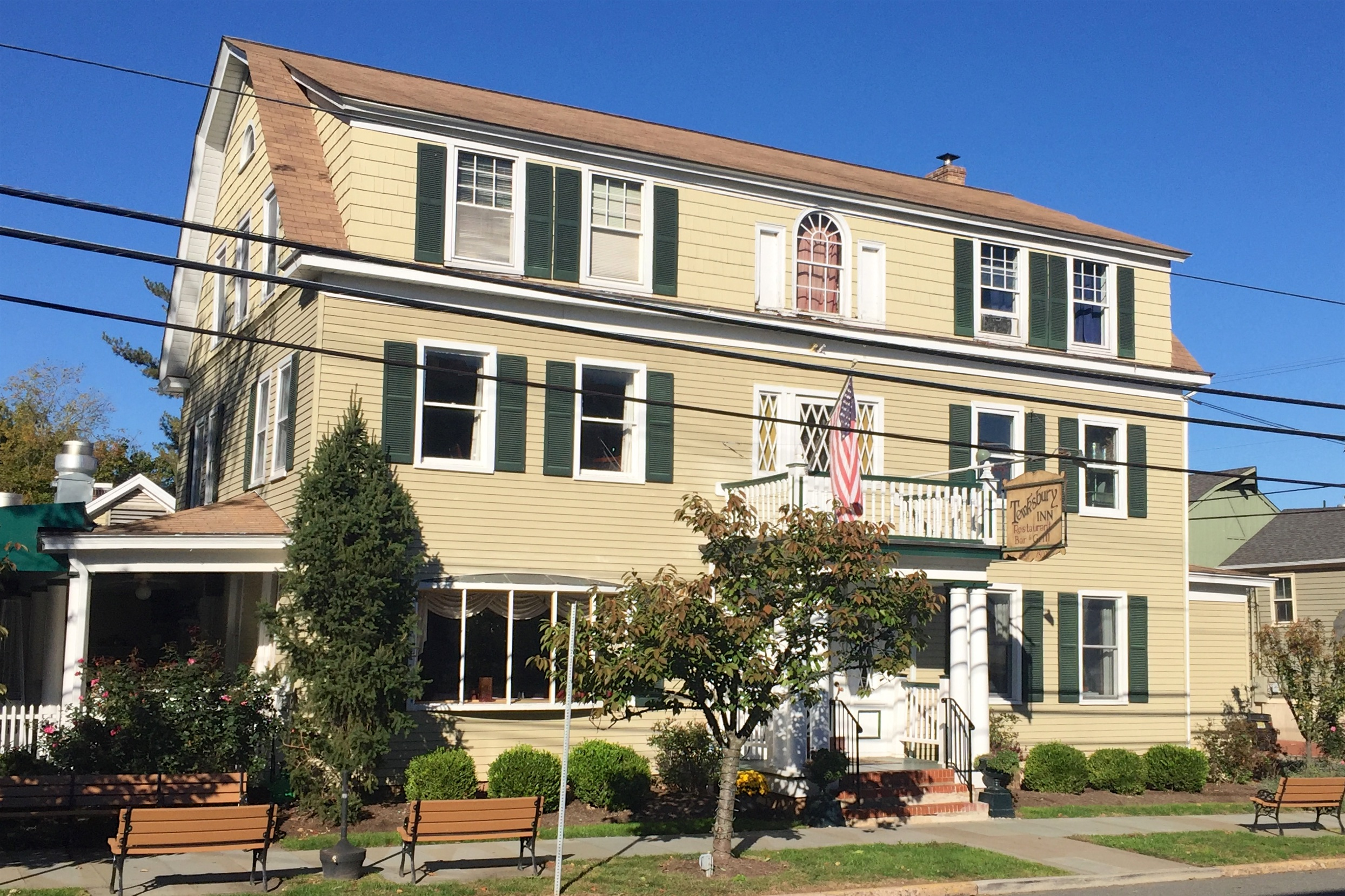
Tewksbury Inn

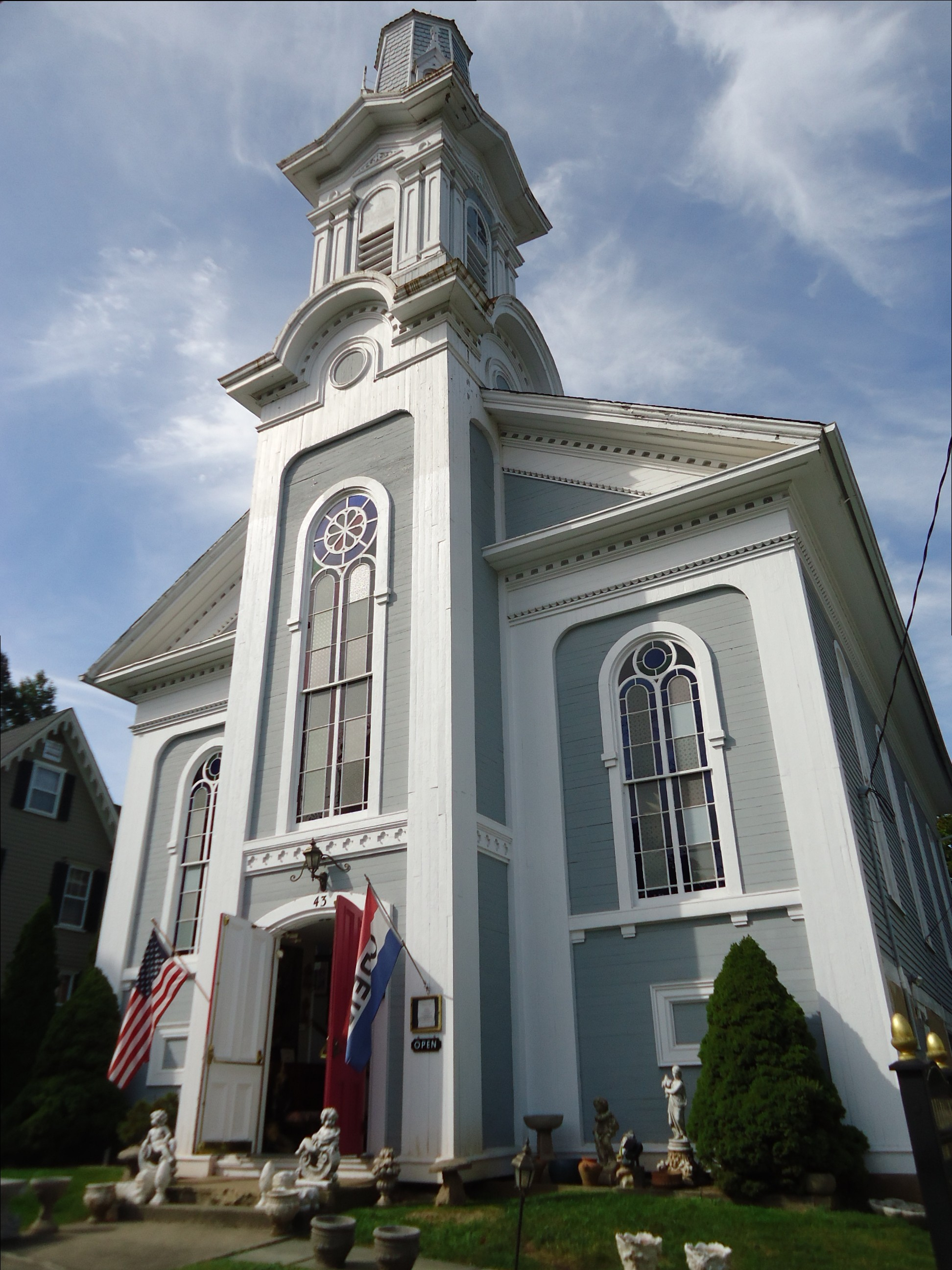
Oldwick Methodist Church

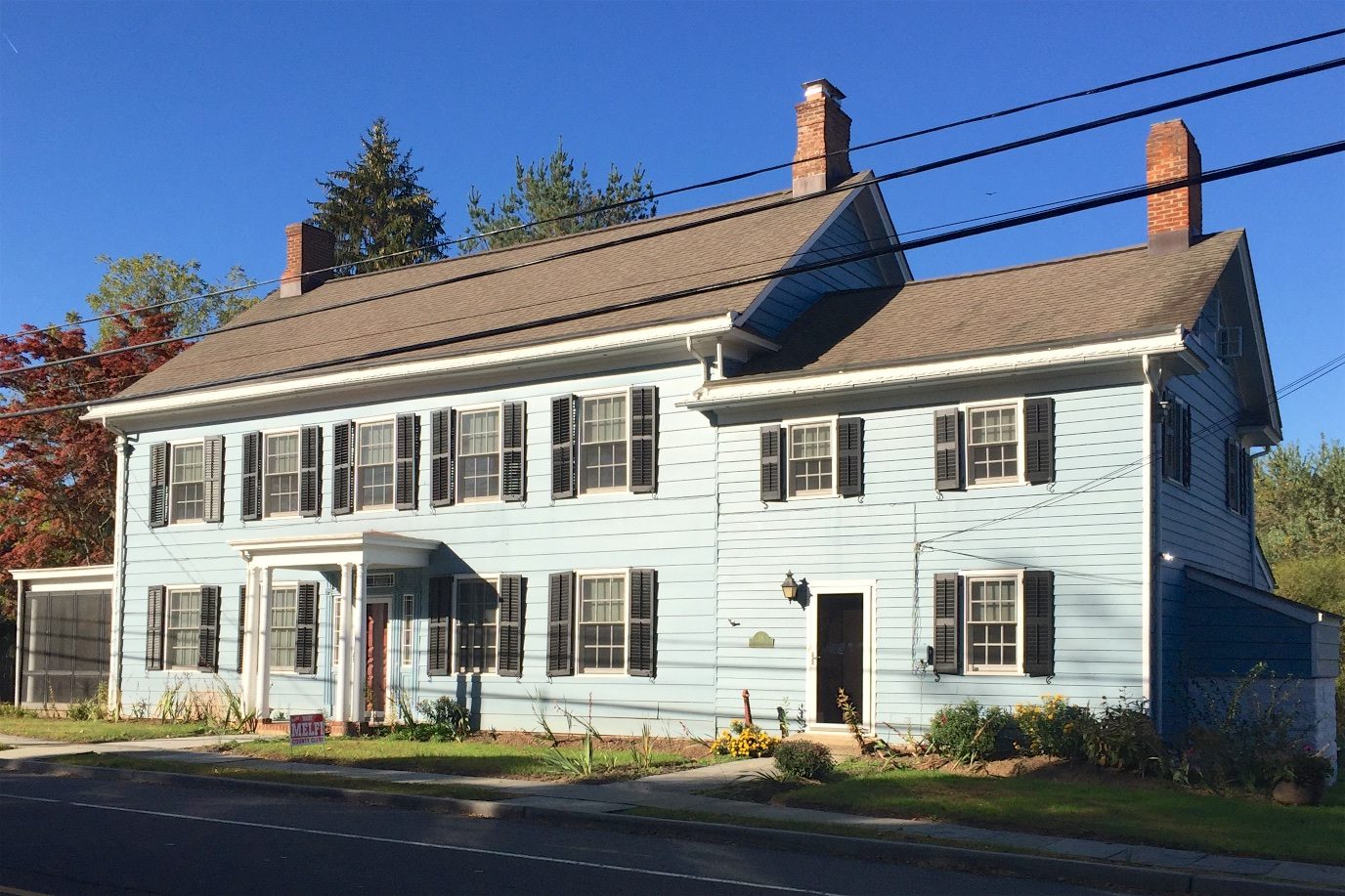
Van Doren House

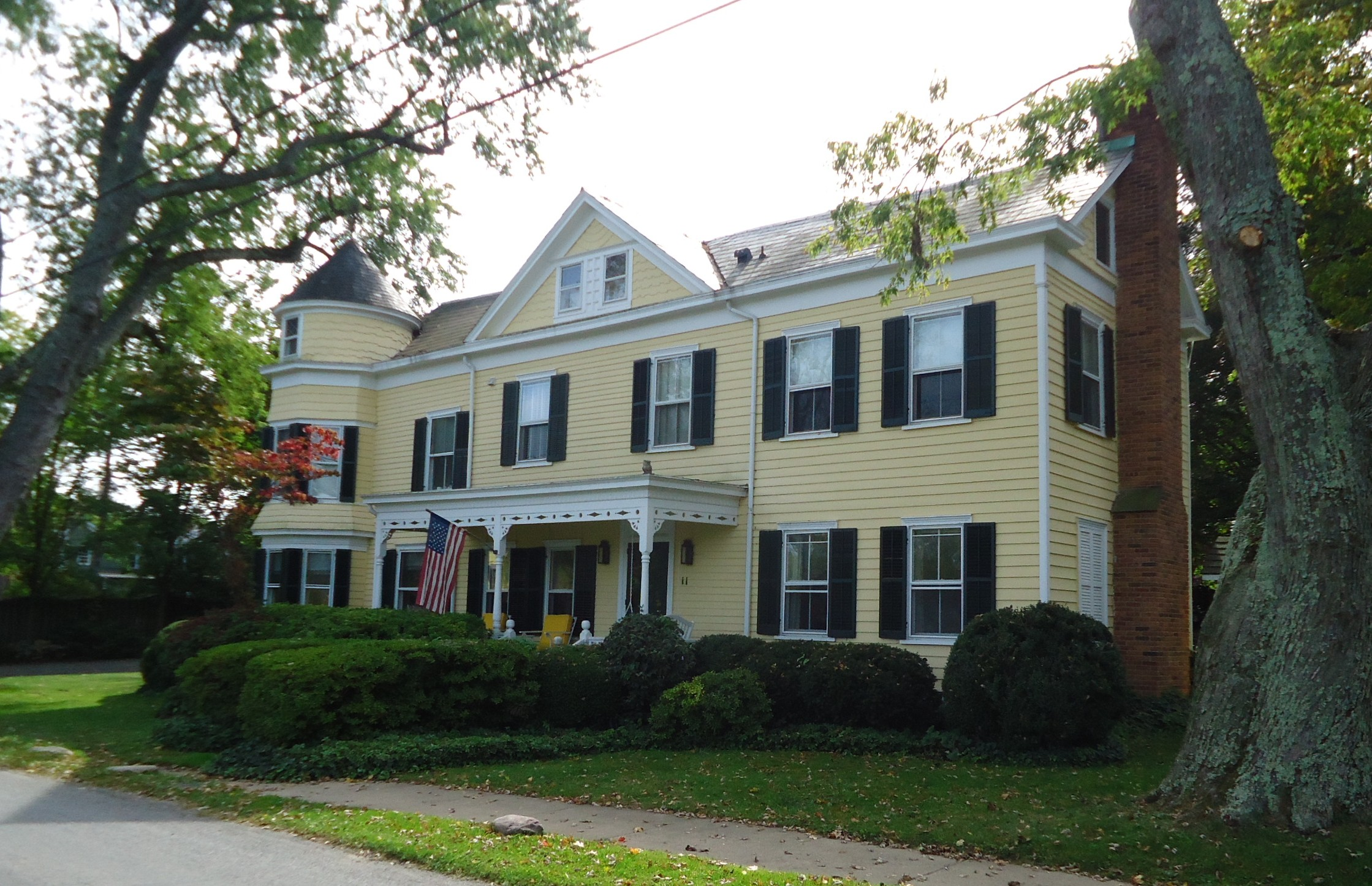
Victorian style house

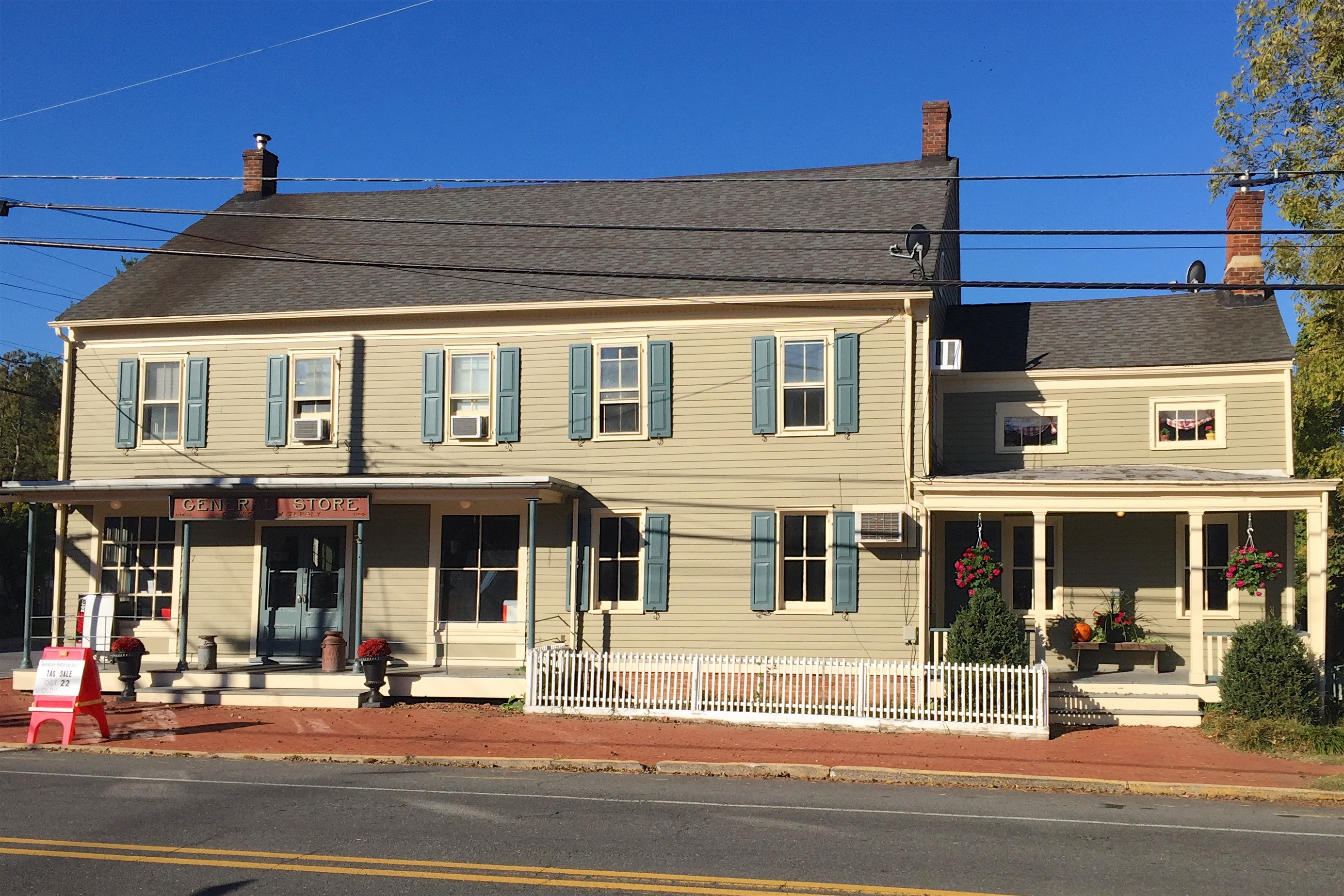
Oldwick General Store

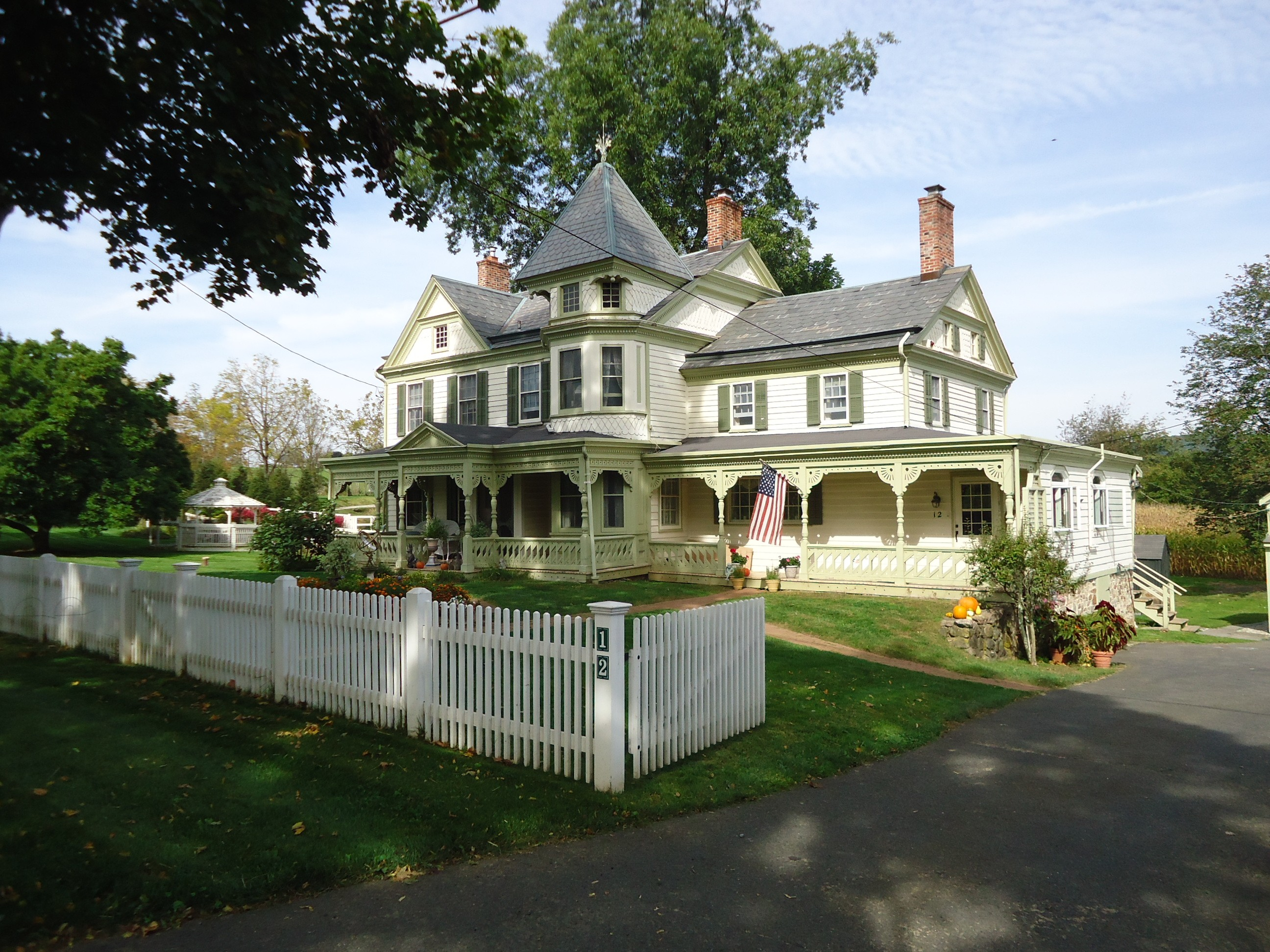
Queen Anne style house

== Transportation ==
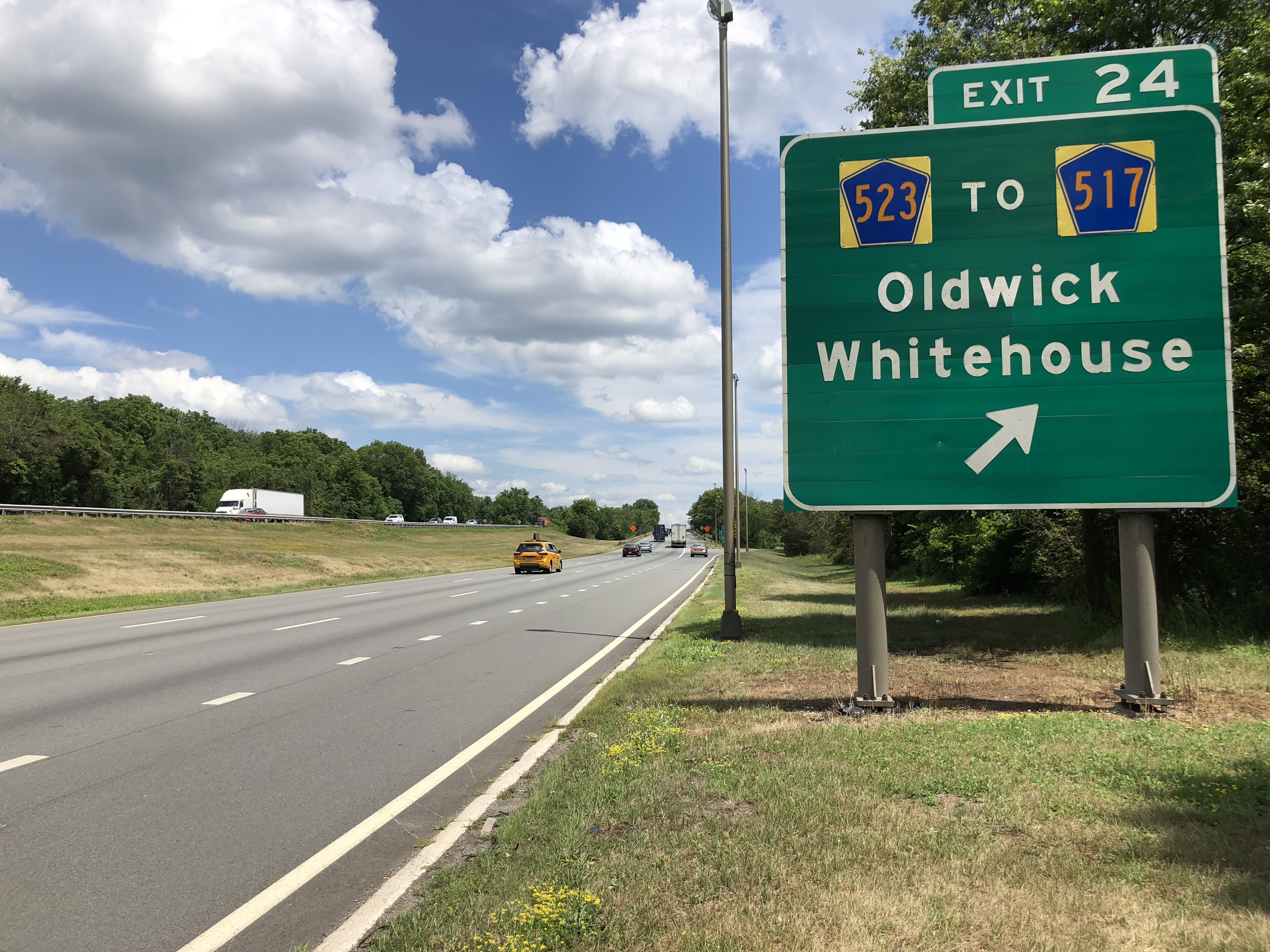
Interstate 78 eastbound in Tewksbury

=== Roads and highways ===
As of May 2010, the township had a total of 99.22 miles (159.68 km) of roadways, of which 82.81 miles (133.27 km) were maintained by the municipality, 15.39 miles (24.77 km) by Hunterdon County and 1.02 miles (1.64 km) by the New Jersey Department of Transportation.

There are several roadways that traverse the township. Interstate 78 passes through the township, and is accessible via Oldwick Road (County Route 523) at Exit 24. County Route 517 also passes through the township.

== Notable people ==
People who were born in, residents of, or otherwise closely associated with Tewksbury Township include:

- Harriet Adams (1892–1982), novelist and publisher who authored some 200 books including many in the Nancy Drew series (under the pseudonym Carolyn Keene) and a few in the Hardy Boys series (under the pseudonym Franklin W. Dixon)
- Joseph Alexander Adams (1803–1880), engraver
- John Amos (1939–2024), actor
- Dan Cocoziello (born 1985), professional lacrosse player
- Everett Fagan (1918–1983), professional baseball player during the 1940s
- Eileen Ford (1922–2014), co-founder of Ford Modeling Agency, now called Ford Models
- Gerard W. Ford (1924–2008), co-founder of Ford Modeling Agency, now called Ford Models
- James Gandolfini (1961–2013), actor best known for his lead role in the HBO series The Sopranos
- Lawrence R. Hafstad (1904–1993), electrical engineer and physicist notable for his pioneering work on nuclear reactors
- Alison Haislip (born 1981), actress and correspondent for G4tv's Attack of the Show!
- Andrew Horowitz (born 1983), musician/singer in Tally Hall
- Kamine family, owners of Olympic horse Royal Kaliber
- Charlie Murphy (1959–2017), actor and comedian
- Joe Piscopo (born 1951), actor and comedian
- Webster B. Todd (1899–1989), businessman, Republican Party leader and father of Christine Todd Whitman
- Frederica von Stade (born 1945), opera singer
- George David Weiss (1921–2010), songwriter and former President of the Songwriters Guild of America
- Christine Todd Whitman (born 1946), 50th Governor of New Jersey
- John Whitman (1944–2015), businessman, investment banker and husband of Christine Todd Whitman
- Kate Whitman Annis (born c. 1977), general manager of the Metropolitan Riveters of the National Women's Hockey League
