= Oldwick, New Jersey =

Populated place in Hunterdon County, New Jersey, US

- Census-designated place
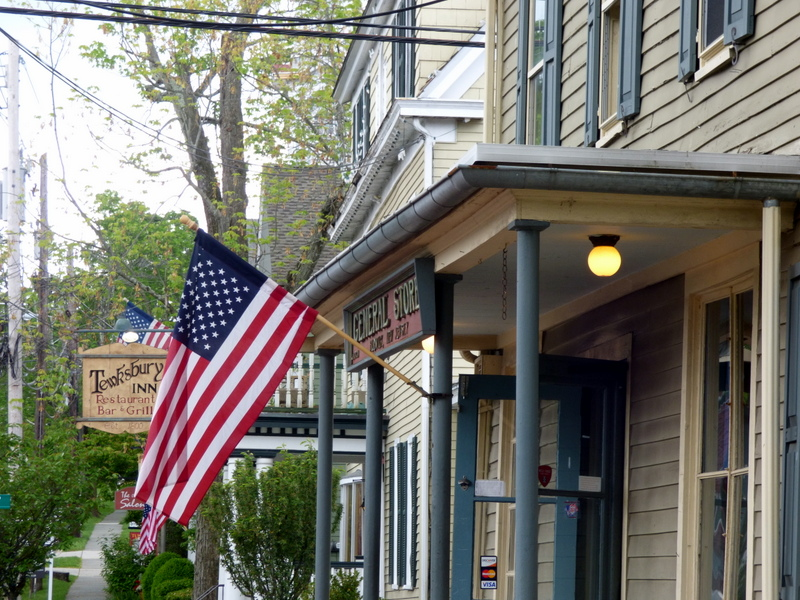
- Businesses in Oldwick

- Location in Hunterdon County Location in New Jersey Location in the United States
- Coordinates: 40°40′21″N 74°44′51″W
- Country: United States
- State: New Jersey
- County: Hunterdon
- Township: Tewksbury

Area
  - Total: 1.80 sq mi (4.67 km^{2})
  - Land: 1.80 sq mi (4.66 km^{2})
  - Water: 0.0039 sq mi (0.01 km^{2})
- Elevation: 217 ft (66 m)

Population (2020)
  - Total: 445
  - Density: 247.4/sq mi (95.54/km^{2})
- ZIP Code: 08858
- FIPS code: 34-54900
- GNIS feature ID: 0878982

Oldwick is an unincorporated community and census-designated place (CDP) located within Tewksbury Township in Hunterdon County, in the U.S. state of New Jersey. The area is served as United States Postal Service ZIP Code 08858. As of the 2020 census, Oldwick had a population of 445.

Oldwick was formerly known as New Germantown. It has a mixture of Victorian, Federal, New England and Georgian style homes, and is protected by historic legislation. Historic sites within Oldwick include the Kline Farmhouse and the Oldwick Historic District.

Zion Lutheran Church in Oldwick was the oldest Lutheran parish in New Jersey.

Oldwick is the corporate headquarters of the A. M. Best rating agency, and is the location of Mane Stream, formerly the Somerset Hills Handicapped Riding Center for adaptive riding and equine assisted therapy.

On April 5, 2024, Oldwick, alongside Lebanon and Tewksbury Township, became epicenters of the 2024 New Jersey earthquake, a rare 4.8 magnitude earthquake that shook much of the Northeast United States.

== Demographics ==
Historical population
Census	Pop.	Note	%±
2020	445		—
U.S. Decennial Census; 2020

Oldwick was first listed as a census designated place in the 2020 U.S. census.

Oldwick CDP, New Jersey – Racial and ethnic composition Note: the US Census treats Hispanic/Latino as an ethnic category. This table excludes Latinos from the racial categories and assigns them to a separate category. Hispanics/Latinos may be of any race.
Race / Ethnicity (NH = Non-Hispanic)	Pop 2020	2020
White alone (NH)	394	88.54%
Black or African American alone (NH)	2	0.45%
Native American or Alaska Native alone (NH)	0	0.00%
Asian alone (NH)	18	4.04%
Native Hawaiian or Pacific Islander alone (NH)	0	0.00%
Other race alone (NH)	0	0.00%
Mixed race or Multiracial (NH)	11	2.47%
Hispanic or Latino (any race)	20	4.49%
Total	445	100.00%

As of the 2020 United States census, the population was 445.

== Notable people ==
People who were born in, residents of, or otherwise closely associated with Oldwick include:

- Lawrence R. Hafstad (1904–1993), electrical engineer and physicist notable for his pioneering work on nuclear reactors.
- Frederica von Stade (born 1945), opera singer.
- George David Weiss (1921–2010), songwriter and former President of the Songwriters Guild of America.
- Kate Whitman Annis (born c. 1977), general manager of the Metropolitan Riveters of the National Women's Hockey League.

== Gallery ==
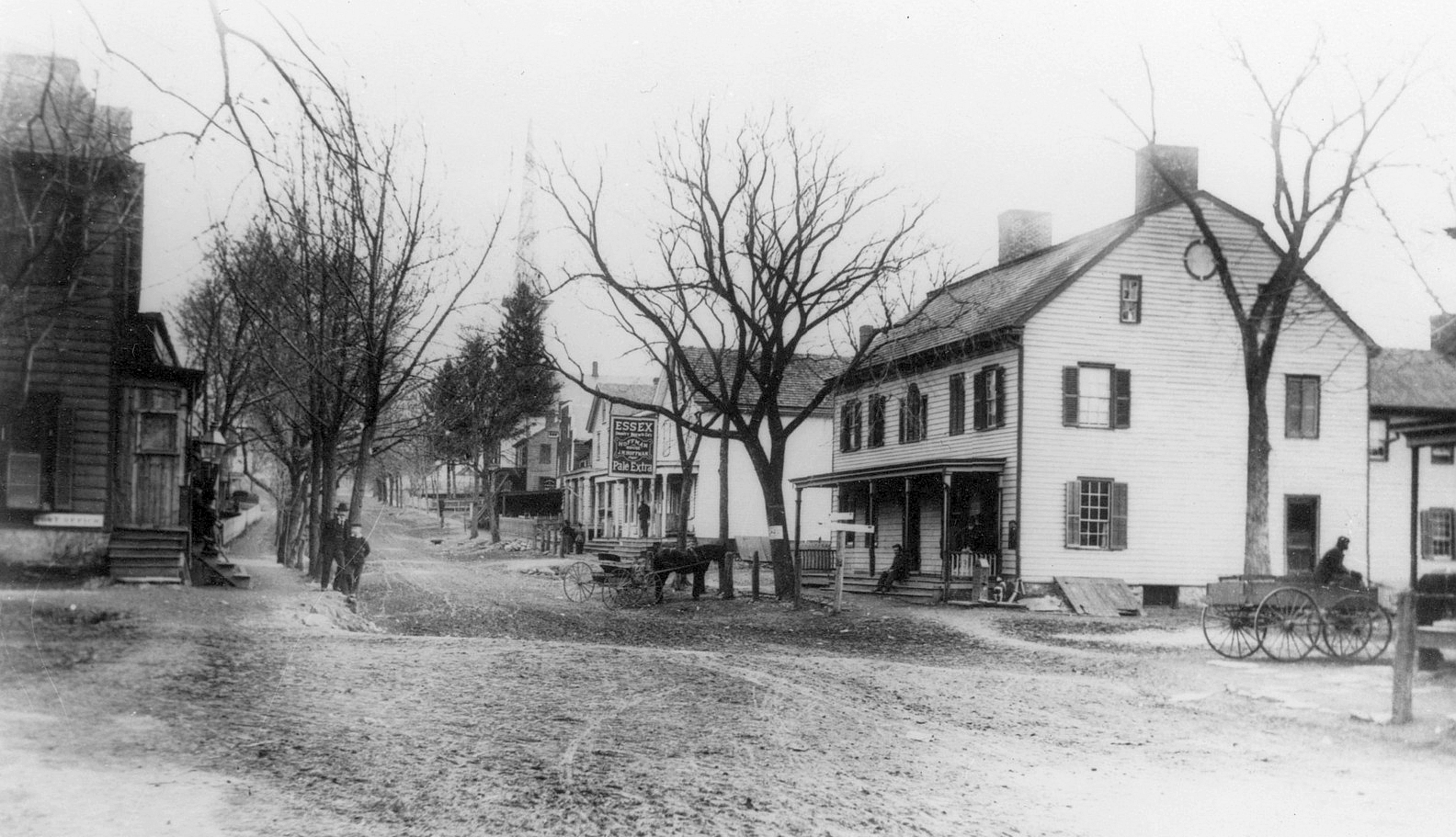
Oldwick (then "New Germantown"), 1900

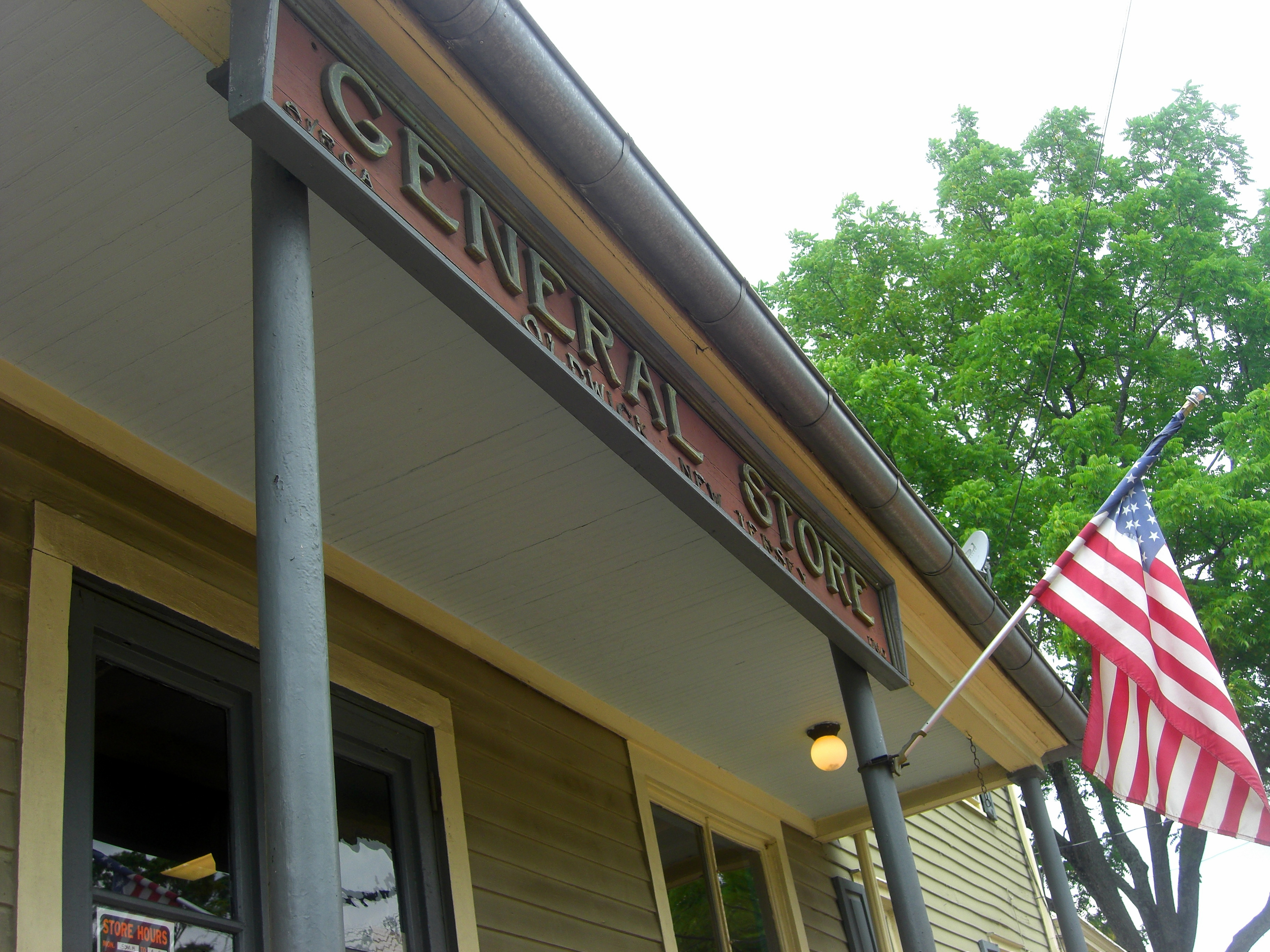
Oldwick General Store

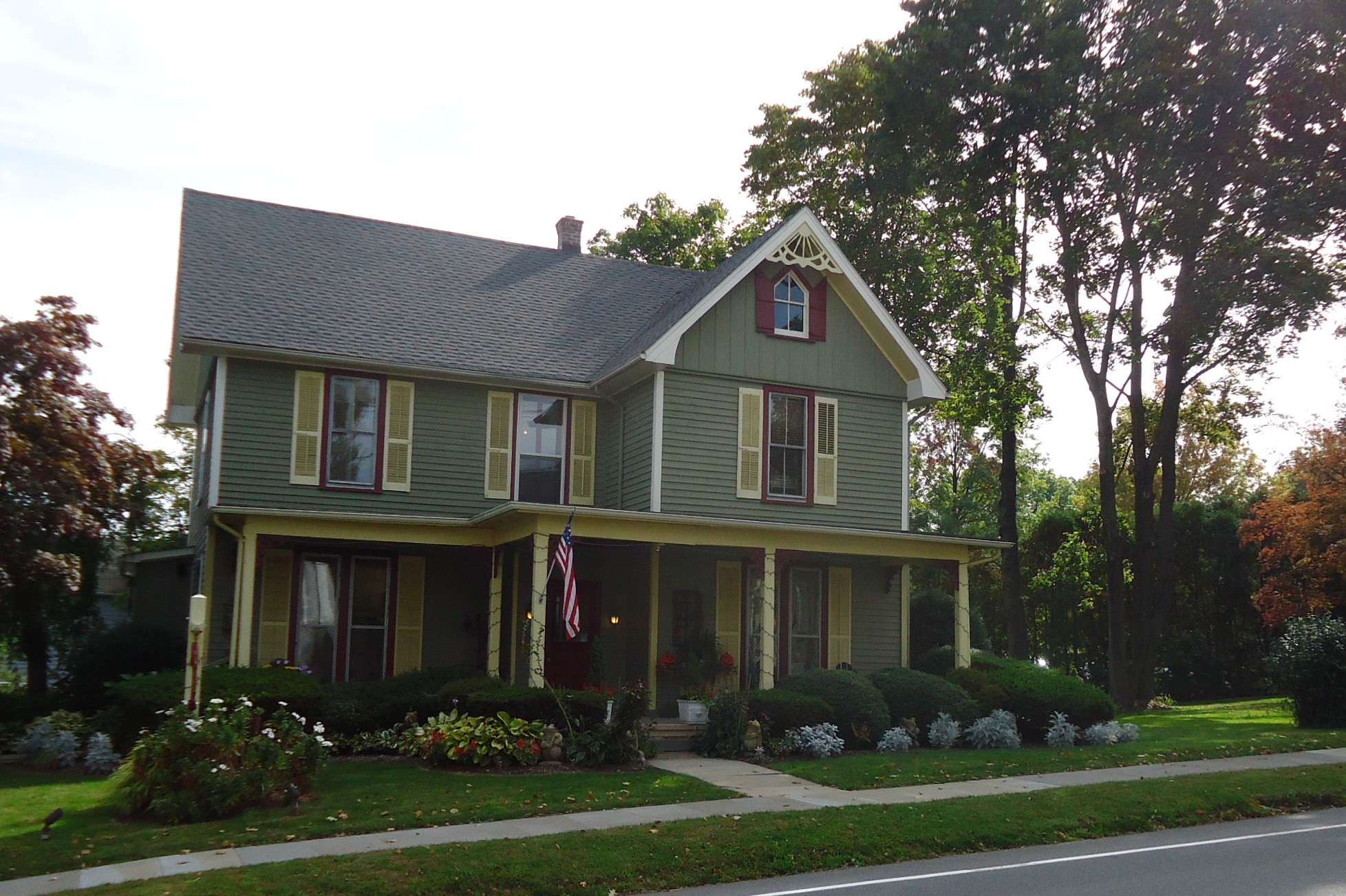
House

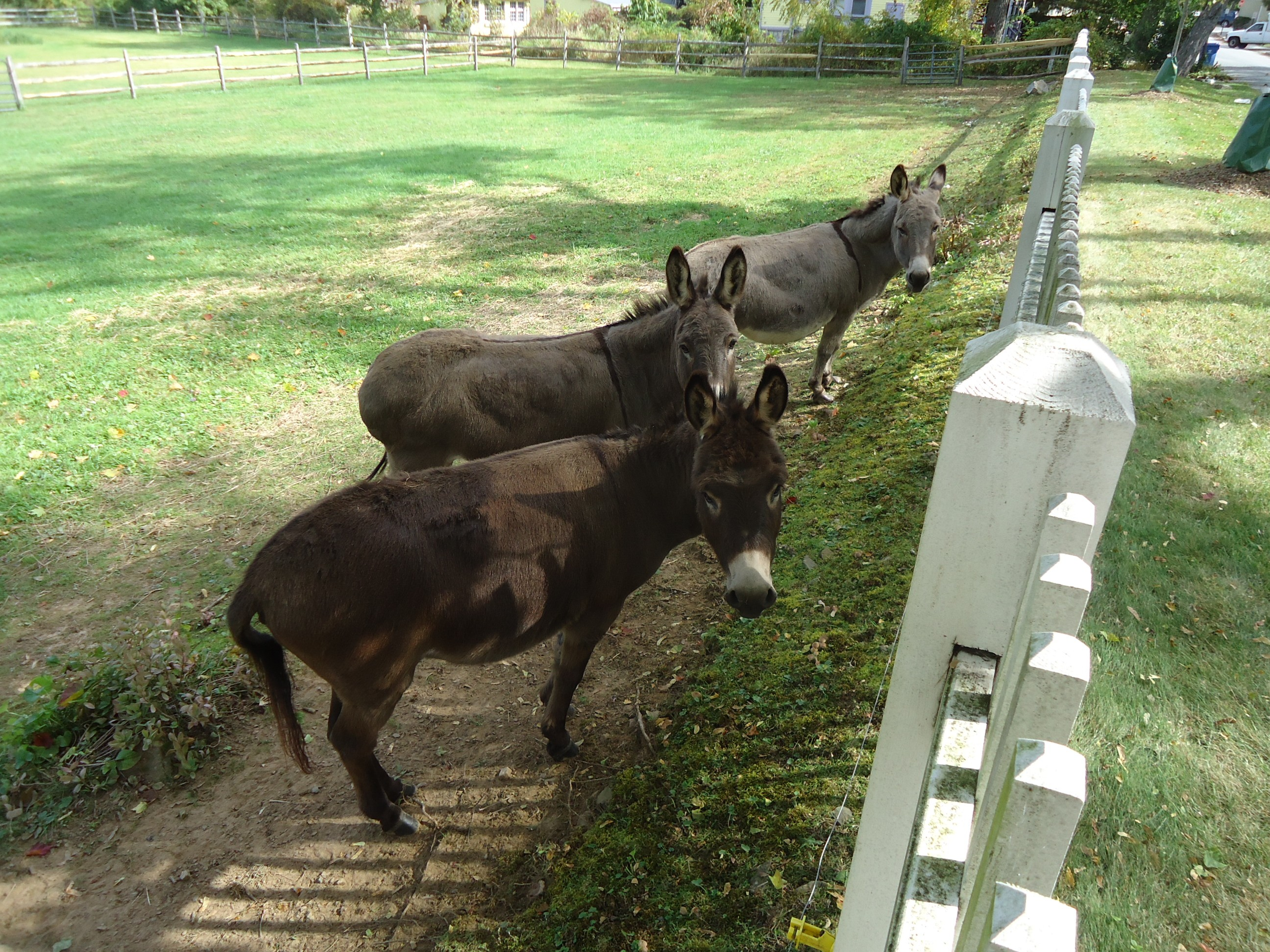
Donkeys on a farm

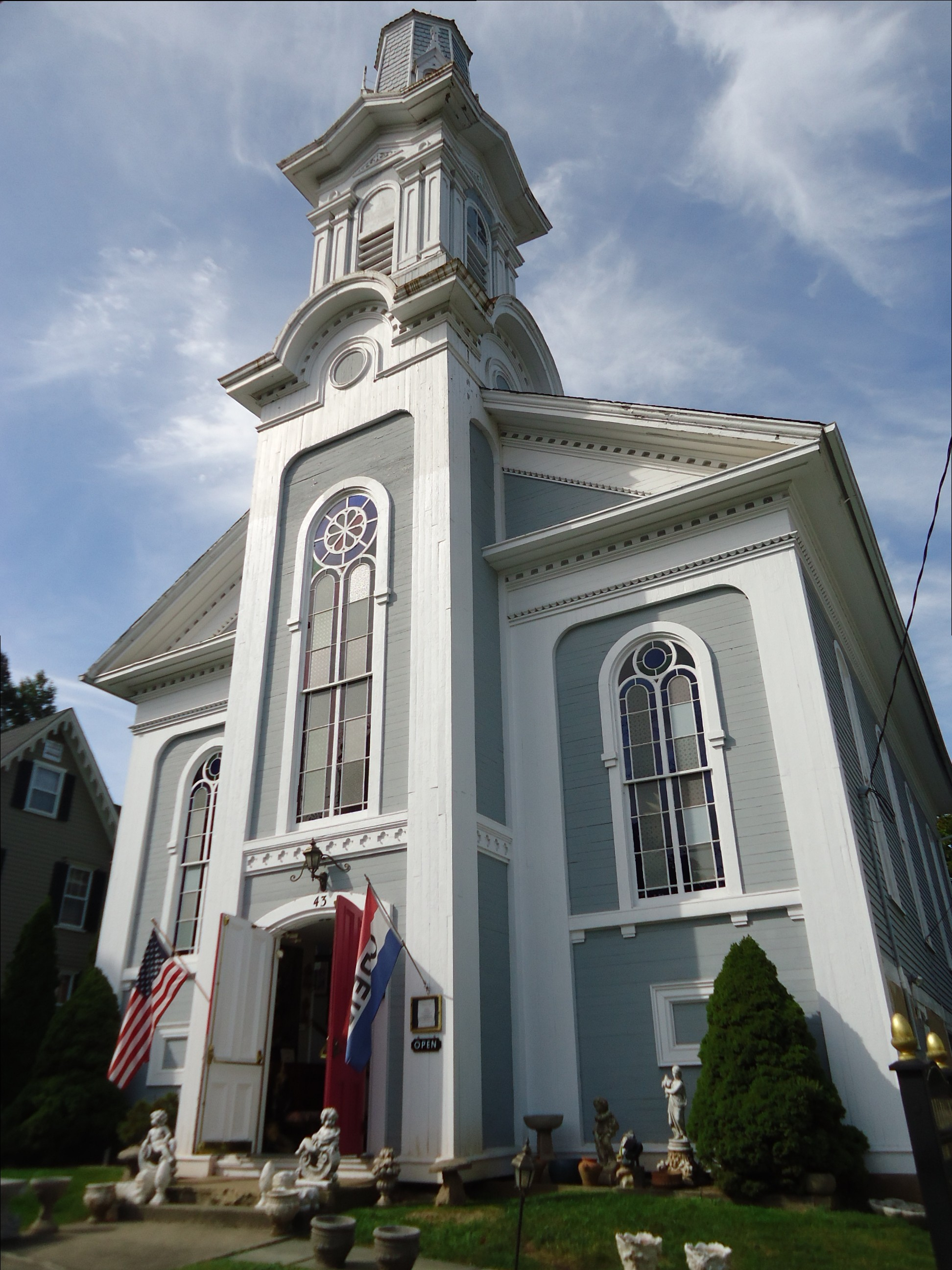
Church now an antique store

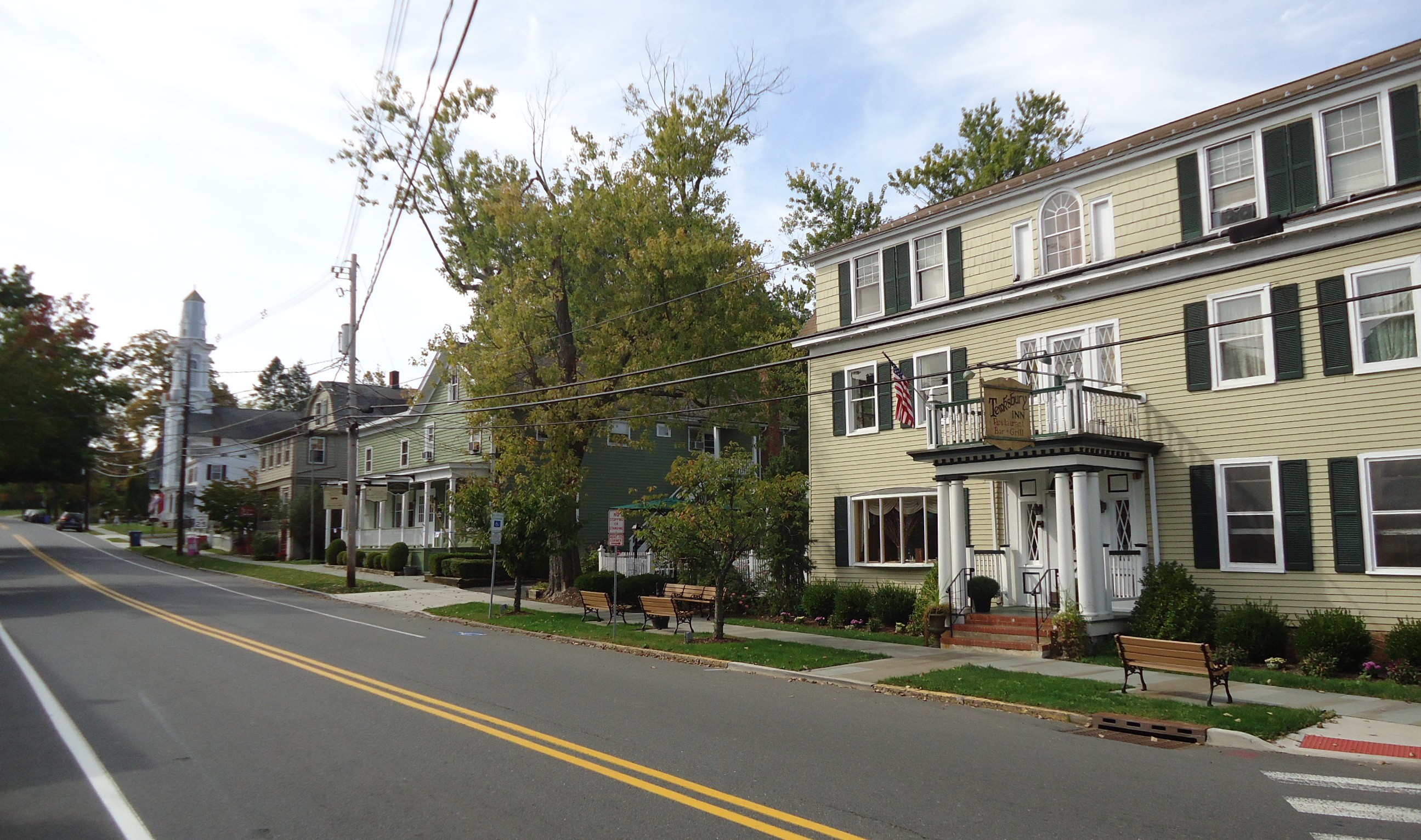
Street scene
