= Łapiński =

Łapiński (feminine: Łapińska), also Lapinski, is a Polish surname. Notable people with the surname include:

- Anna Kamieńska-Łapińska (1932–2007), Polish sculptor
- Henryk Łapiński (1933–2020), Polish actor
- Izabela Łapińska (born 1972), Polish photographer
- John Lapinski (born 1967), American journalist
- Lisa Lapinski (born 1967), American visual artist
- Stanisław Łapiński (1895–1972), Polish actor
- Teofil Łapiński (1827–1886), Polish military commander and writer
- Tomasz Łapiński (born 1969), Polish footballer and commentator
- Zbigniew Łapiński (1947–2018), Polish musician
