= Franklin Township School District (Hunterdon County, New Jersey) =

Place in Mercer County, New Jersey, US

Address
- 226 Quakertown Road Quakertown, Hunterdon County, New Jersey, 08868; United States
- Coordinates: 40.5669°N 74.9470°W

District information
- Grades: PreK-8
- Superintendent: Jennifer Aquino (interim)
- Business administrator: Mark Kramer (interim)
- Schools: 1

Students and staff
- Enrollment: 272 (as of 2023–24)
- Faculty: 32.2 FTEs
- Student–teacher ratio: 8.5:1

Other information
- District Factor Group: I
- Website: www.ftschool.org
Ind.	Per pupil	District spending	Rank (*)	K-8 average	%± vs. average
1A	Total Spending	$23,615	61	$18,891	25.0%
1	Budgetary Cost	16,127	45	14,159	13.9%
2	Classroom Instruction	10,641	57	8,659	22.9%
6	Support Services	1,956	22	2,167	−9.7%
8	Administrative Cost	1,844	57	1,547	19.2%
10	Operations & Maintenance	1,686	29	1,612	4.6%
16	Median Teacher Salary	71,863	70	61,136
Data from NJDoE 2014 Taxpayers' Guide to Education Spending. *Of K-8 districts with up to 400 students. Lowest spending=1; Highest=71

The Franklin Township School District is a community public school district that serves students in pre-kindergarten through eighth grade from Franklin Township, in Hunterdon County, in the U.S. state of New Jersey.

As of the 2023–24 school year, the district, comprised of one school, had an enrollment of 272 students and 32.2 classroom teachers (on an FTE basis), for a student–teacher ratio of 8.5:1.

Public school students in ninth through twelfth grades attend North Hunterdon High School in Annandale together with students from Bethlehem Township, Clinton Town, Clinton Township, Lebanon Borough and Union Township. As of the 2023–24 school year, the high school had an enrollment of 1,262 students and 115.5 classroom teachers (on an FTE basis), for a student–teacher ratio of 10.9:1. The school is part of the North Hunterdon-Voorhees Regional High School District, which also includes students from Califon, Glen Gardner, Hampton, High Bridge, Lebanon Township and Tewksbury Township, who attend Voorhees High School in Lebanon Township.

== History ==
The district commissioned a study with the Union Township School District that considered the possibility of the two communities forming a regional PreK–8 school district, with the possibility of the inclusion of the Bethlehem Township School District as a third member. The analysis by the consultants who performed the feasibility study estimated that savings of $1 million (2023 dollars) could be achieved without negatively impacting the racial distribution in the district's schools.

Franklin Township was one of two districts added to the Interdistrict Public School Choice Program in October 2011, opening up three seats in each grade starting in the 2012-13 school year, a total of 27 student seats, that parents from outside the district could apply to fill. The district ended its participation in the program in May 2023.

The district had been classified by the New Jersey Department of Education as being in District Factor Group "I", the second-highest of eight groupings. District Factor Groups organize districts statewide to allow comparison by common socioeconomic characteristics of the local districts. From lowest socioeconomic status to highest, the categories are A, B, CD, DE, FG, GH, I and J.

== School ==
The Franklin Township School served an enrollment of 271 students in grades PreK-8 as of the 2023–24 school year.

- Lindsay Gooditis, principal

== Administration ==
Core members of the district's administration are:

- Jennifer Aquino, interim superintendent
- Mark Kramer, interim business administrator

== Board of education ==
The district's board of education, comprised of seven members, sets policy and oversees the fiscal and educational operation of the district through its administration. As a Type II school district, the board's trustees are elected directly by voters to serve three-year terms of office on a staggered basis, with three seats up for election each year held (since 2012) as part of the November general election. The board appoints a superintendent to oversee the district's day-to-day operations and a business administrator to supervise the business functions of the district.
