= Union Township School District =

School district in Hunterdon County, New Jersey, US

Address
- 165 Perryville Road Hampton, Hunterdon County, New Jersey, 08827; United States
- Coordinates: 40.632521°N 74.969428°W

District information
- Grades: K-8
- Superintendent: Lisa Antunes
- Business administrator: Eva Preuett
- Schools: 2

Students and staff
- Enrollment: 478 (as of 2023–24)
- Faculty: 50.7 FTEs
- Student–teacher ratio: 9.4:1

Other information
- District Factor Group: GH
- Website: www.uniontwpschool.org
Ind.	Per pupil	District spending	Rank (*)	K-8 average	%± vs. average
1A	Total Spending	$22,721	58	$18,891	20.3%
1	Budgetary Cost	16,056	47	14,159	13.4%
2	Classroom Instruction	9,305	43	8,659	7.5%
6	Support Services	2,681	54	2,167	23.7%
8	Administrative Cost	1,846	54	1,547	19.3%
10	Operations & Maintenance	2,058	57	1,612	27.7%
13	Extracurricular Activities	167	42	104	60.6%
16	Median Teacher Salary	68,595	55	61,136
Data from NJDoE 2014 Taxpayers' Guide to Education Spending. *Of K-8 districts with 401-750 students. Lowest spending=1; Highest=64

The Union Township School District is a community public school district that serves students in kindergarten through eighth grade from Union Township, in Hunterdon County, in the U.S. state of New Jersey.

As of the 2023–24 school year, the district, comprised of two schools, had an enrollment of 478 students and 50.7 classroom teachers (on an FTE basis), for a student–teacher ratio of 9.4:1.

Public school students in ninth through twelfth grades attend North Hunterdon High School in Annandale, which also serves students from Bethlehem Township, Clinton Town, Clinton Township, Franklin Township and Lebanon Borough. As of the 2023–24 school year, the high school had an enrollment of 1,262 students and 115.5 classroom teachers (on an FTE basis), for a student–teacher ratio of 10.9:1. The school is part of the North Hunterdon-Voorhees Regional High School District, which also includes students from Califon, Glen Gardner, Hampton, High Bridge, Lebanon Township and Tewksbury Township, who attend Voorhees High School in Lebanon Township.

== History ==
Voters approved $14.9 million in referendum funding covering the cost of a new 60,000-square-foot (5,600 m^{2}) Union Township Elementary School, which opened for the 2006–07 school year, at which time the older building, constructed in 1953, was renamed Union Township Middle School.

The district commissioned a study with the Franklin Township School District that considered the possibility of the two communities forming a regional district, with the possibility of the inclusion of the Bethlehem Township School District as a third member. The analysis by the consultants who performed the feasibility study estimated that savings of $1 million (2023 dollars) could be achieved without negatively impacting the racial distribution in the district's schools.

The district had been classified by the New Jersey Department of Education as being in District Factor Group "GH", the third-highest of eight groupings. District Factor Groups organize districts statewide to allow comparison by common socioeconomic characteristics of the local districts. From lowest socioeconomic status to highest, the categories are A, B, CD, DE, FG, GH, I and J.

== Schools ==
Schools in the district (with 2023–24 enrollment data from the National Center for Education Statistics) are:

Elementary school

- Union Township Elementary School with 220 students in grades PreK–3
  - Rhonda Pevorus, principal

Middle school

- Union Township Middle School with 253 students in grades 4–8
  - Kerry Foote, principal

== Extracurricular activities ==
Union Township Middle School offers a wide variety of after school activities; student council, drama club, volleyball, baseball, softball, boys and girls basketball, boys and girls soccer, cheerleading, cross-country, science club, computer club, as well as art club along with National Junior Honor Society.

== Administration ==
Core members of the district's administration are:

- Lisa Antunes, superintendent
- Eva Preuett, business administrator and board secretary

== Board of administration ==
The district's board of education, comprised of nine members, sets policy and oversees the fiscal and educational operation of the district through its administration. As a Type II school district, the board's trustees are elected directly by voters to serve three-year terms of office on a staggered basis, with three seats up for election each year held (since 2012) as part of the November general election. The board appoints a superintendent to oversee the district's day-to-day operations and a business administrator to supervise the business functions of the district.
