= Bethlehem Township School District =

School district in Hunterdon County, New Jersey, US

Address
- 940 Iron Bridge Road Asbury, Hunterdon County, New Jersey, 08802; United States
- Coordinates: 40.683067°N 74.993562°W

District information
- Grades: PreK-8
- Superintendent: Edward Abato
- Business administrator: Kirby Hendershot
- Schools: 2

Students and staff
- Enrollment: 364 (as of 2023–24)
- Faculty: 36.5 FTEs
- Student–teacher ratio: 10.0:1

Other information
- District Factor Group: I
- Website: www.btschools.org
Ind.	Per pupil	District spending	Rank (*)	K-8 average	%± vs. average
1A	Total Spending	$21,495	53	$18,891	13.8%
1	Budgetary Cost	16,867	54	14,159	19.1%
2	Classroom Instruction	10,005	53	8,659	15.5%
6	Support Services	2,512	45	2,167	15.9%
8	Administrative Cost	1,823	46	1,547	17.8%
10	Operations & Maintenance	2,319	60	1,612	43.9%
13	Extracurricular Activities	209	52	104	101.0%
16	Median Teacher Salary	57,391	21	61,136
Data from NJDoE 2014 Taxpayers' Guide to Education Spending. *Of K-8 districts with 401-750 students. Lowest spending=1; Highest=64

The Bethlehem Township School District is a community public school district that serves students in pre-kindergarten through eighth grade from Bethlehem Township, in Hunterdon County, in the U.S. state of New Jersey.

As of the 2023–24 school year, the district, comprised of two schools, had an enrollment of 364 students and 36.5 classroom teachers (on an FTE basis), for a student–teacher ratio of 10.0:1.

The district participates in the Interdistrict Public School Choice Program, which allows non-resident students to attend school in the district at no cost to their parents, with tuition covered by the resident district. Available slots are announced annually by grade.

Public school students in ninth through twelfth grades attend North Hunterdon High School in Annandale, which also serves students from Clinton Town, Clinton Township, Franklin Township, Lebanon Borough and Union Township. As of the 2023–24 school year, the high school had an enrollment of 1,262 students and 115.5 classroom teachers (on an FTE basis), for a student–teacher ratio of 10.9:1. The school is part of the North Hunterdon-Voorhees Regional High School District, which also includes students from Califon, Glen Gardner, Hampton, High Bridge, Lebanon Township and Tewksbury Township, who attend Voorhees High School in Lebanon Township.

== History ==
The Franklin Township School District and the Union Township School District commissioned a study that considered the possibility of the two communities forming a regional PreK–8 school district, with the possibility of the inclusion of the Bethlehem Township School District as a third member. The analysis by the consultants who performed the feasibility study estimated that savings of $1 million (2023 dollars) could be achieved without negatively impacting the racial distribution in the district's schools.

The district had been classified by the New Jersey Department of Education as being in District Factor Group "I", the second-highest of eight groupings. District Factor Groups organize districts statewide to allow comparison by common socioeconomic characteristics of the local districts. From lowest socioeconomic status to highest, the categories are A, B, CD, DE, FG, GH, I and J.

== Schools ==
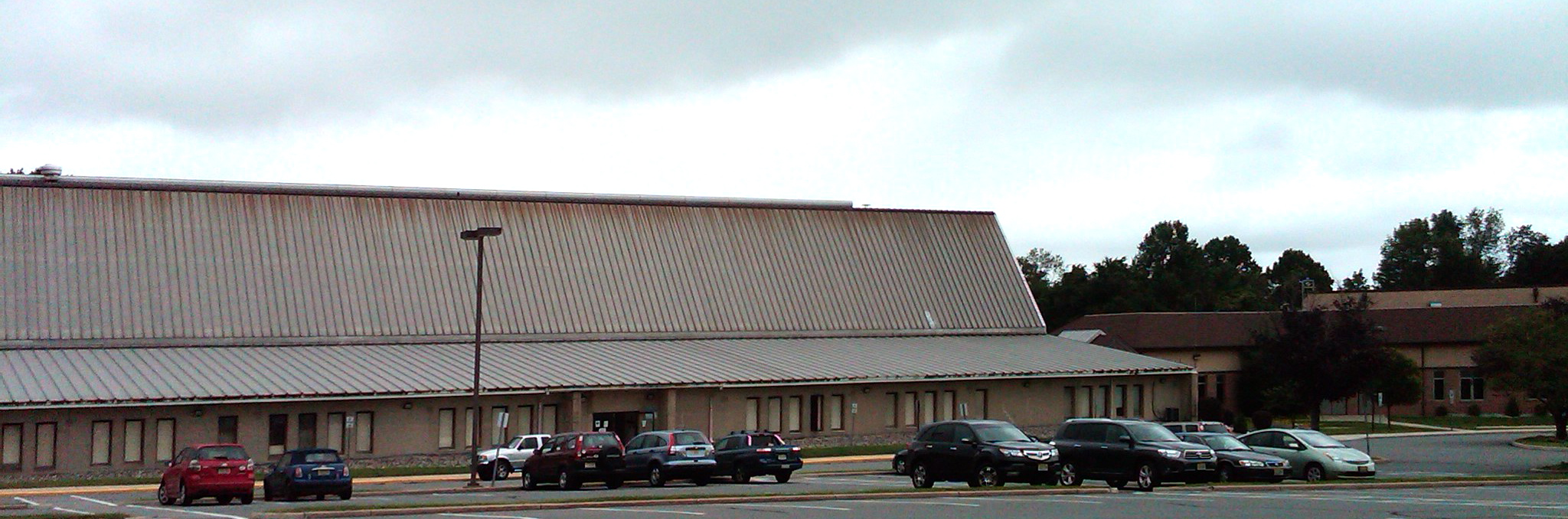
Thomas B. Conley Elementary School

Schools in the district (with 2032–24 enrollment data from the National Center for Education Statistics) are:

Elementary school

- Thomas B. Conley Elementary School with 228 students in grades PreK–5
  - Bree Brace-Robinson, principal

Middle school

- Ethel Hoppock Middle School with 134 students in grades 6–8
  - Kris Boganski, principal

== Extracurricular activities and sports ==
- Band
- Chorus
- Orchestra
- Student council
- Debate club
- Drama club
- Peer leaders
- Boys and girls cross country
- Boys and girls basketball
- Girls volleyball
- Boys baseball
- Soccer (co-ed)
- Girls softball

== Administration ==
Core members of the district's administration are:

- Edward Abato, superintendent of schools
- Kirby Hendershot, business administrator and board secretary

== Board of education ==
The district's board of education is comprised of seven members who set policy and oversee the fiscal and educational operation of the district through its administration. As a Type II school district, the board's trustees are elected directly by voters to serve three-year terms of office on a staggered basis, with either two or three seats up for election each year held (since 2012) as part of the November general election. The board appoints a superintendent to oversee the district's day-to-day operations and a business administrator to supervise the business functions of the district.
