= Charlestown, New Jersey =

Populated place in Hunterdon County, New Jersey, US

- Unincorporated community
- Charlestown's location in Hunterdon County (Inset: Hunterdon County in New Jersey) Charlestown, New Jersey (New Jersey) Charlestown, New Jersey (the United States)
- Coordinates: 40°41′21″N 74°58′21″W
- Country: United States
- State: New Jersey
- County: Hunterdon
- Township: Bethlehem
- Elevation: 718 ft (219 m)
- Time zone: UTC−05:00 (Eastern (EST))
  - Summer (DST): UTC−04:00 (EDT)
- GNIS feature ID: 875373

Charlestown is an unincorporated community located within Bethlehem Township, in Hunterdon County, in the U.S. state of New Jersey, off County Route 635, 1.5 miles (2.4 km) southwest of Hampton.

== History ==
By 1881, Charlestown had a school, wheelwright shop, blacksmith and about twelve dwellings.
