= UTMS =

UTMS may refer to:

- Union Township Middle School - Union Township, Hunterdon Township, New Jersey - Union Township School District
- Upper Township Middle School - Upper Township, New Jersey - Upper Township School District
