= Michael Masch =

American financial governance leader

Michael J. Masch

Pennsylvania Secretary of the Budget
- In office 2003–2008
- Preceded by: Robert A. Bittenbender
- Succeeded by: Mary A. Soderberg

Personal details
- Born: October 14, 1950 Philadelphia, Pennsylvania
- Died: February 7, 2021 (aged 70) Washington, DC
- Party: Democratic
- Spouse: Rachel Falkove
- Education: University of Pennsylvania

Michael J. Masch was a financial governance leader who worked to design and balance budgets for the City of Philadelphia, State of Pennsylvania, and School District of Philadelphia as well as serving in executive financial management roles for the University of Pennsylvania, Manhattan College and Howard University.

== Early life and education ==
Masch was born October 14, 1950, adopted as a child to Jewish parents, and raised in a rowhouse in Southwest Philadelphia graduating from Central High School in 1968. After high school he attended Temple University for four years majoring in urban studies but left just before graduation. After his studies he wrote for The Jewish Exponent, worked as an editor and writer for a weekly newspaper Drummer which served the area’s the counterculture audience in the 1970s, and was later a community organizer with the Northwest Interfaith Movement. Realizing “do-gooder” work would only go so far he decided to study for a master’s in public policy analysis from the University of Pennsylvania but did not complete a degree until 2004 when he obtained his master’s degree in government and public administration from the Fels Institute of Government at Penn after he had been serving in financial leadership roles for 20 years.

== Career ==
Masch served from 1983-1991 as director of economic analysis for the Philadelphia City Council and in 1992 became the City of Philadelphia’s chief budget director under then Mayor Ed Rendell. At the time the department didn’t have a good accounting of the city’s financial standing and Masch developed a system to monitor spending and track budgets while also encouraging innovation. Masch was credited with bringing policy and spending analysts together in one newly formed department Office of Budget and Program Evaluation where spending and needs could be clearly tracked and managed. During this period he helped create the Philly Phlash, a transit line between Philadelphia's main tourist attractions, naming it after his favorite Marvel Comics character Flash.

In 1996 Masch was hired as executive director of the University of Pennsylvania’s newly-renamed Office of Budget and Management Analysis serving at the university until 2003. He was appointed by Philadelphia Mayor John Street in 2002 as one of the inaugural members of the Philadelphia School Reform Commission, which replaced the Board of Education where Masch had been a member.

In 2003 Masch took a leave of absence from his now post as vice president of budget and management at the University of Pennsylvania to take the role of Secretary of the Budget offered to him by newly elected Pennsylvania Governor Ed Rendell. Rendell cited his performance as Philadelphia budget director where he turned the city budget deficit into a surplus. Additionally, he established the Pennsylvania Office of Performance Improvement to gauge and enhance the efficiency of state agencies under his purview. When Masch left state government to serve as chief financial officer of the School District of Philadelphia, the state had ended the 2007-2008 fiscal year with a $167 million surplus.

While Masch helped restore the Philadelphia School District to balanced and surplus budgets and restructured long-term debt during his tenure, he was criticized for failing to overcome budget cuts from the state. He warned the School Reform Commission that the 2011-2012 budget would have shortfalls as federal stimulus money was ending without state or federal monies to replace it. The governor at the time Tom Corbett proposed disproportionate cuts in state education to the Philadelphia public school system. It was during this time a Philadelphia Inquirer reporter noticed that Masch owed $8,350 in back taxes, which Masch paid and said that he hoped he set an example for others who found out they owed back taxes. In 2012, the School Reform Commission overhauled its leadership structure which led to Masch leaving his role that year amidst a forecasted $312 million shortfall.

In 2013, Masch was appointed vice president for finance and chief financial officer at Manhattan College in New York City where he served until 2015 when he was recruited to Howard University in Washington, D.C. As the vice president and chief financial officer at Howard he helped the university achieve greater financial stability.

== Personal life and death ==
Masch met his wife Rachel Falkove when they were both students at Temple University and were both active in Jewish Community. They have two sons and two grandchildren. He died February 7, 2021 at the age of 70.

== Legacy ==
The Philadelphia City Council passed a resolution honoring Masch "on the occasion of his passing, for a lifetime of dedicated service to the people of Philadelphia". Former governor Ed Rendell said he was an impactful public servant for the city, the state and the school district who worked to not only save taxpayers money but also to make people's lives better. Howard University president Wayne A. I. Frederick noted that Masch tackled difficult challenges while doing so in a selfless manner for the good of others.
