= Fels Institute of Government =

Public policy school at the University of Pennsylvania

University of Pennsylvania Fels Institute of Government
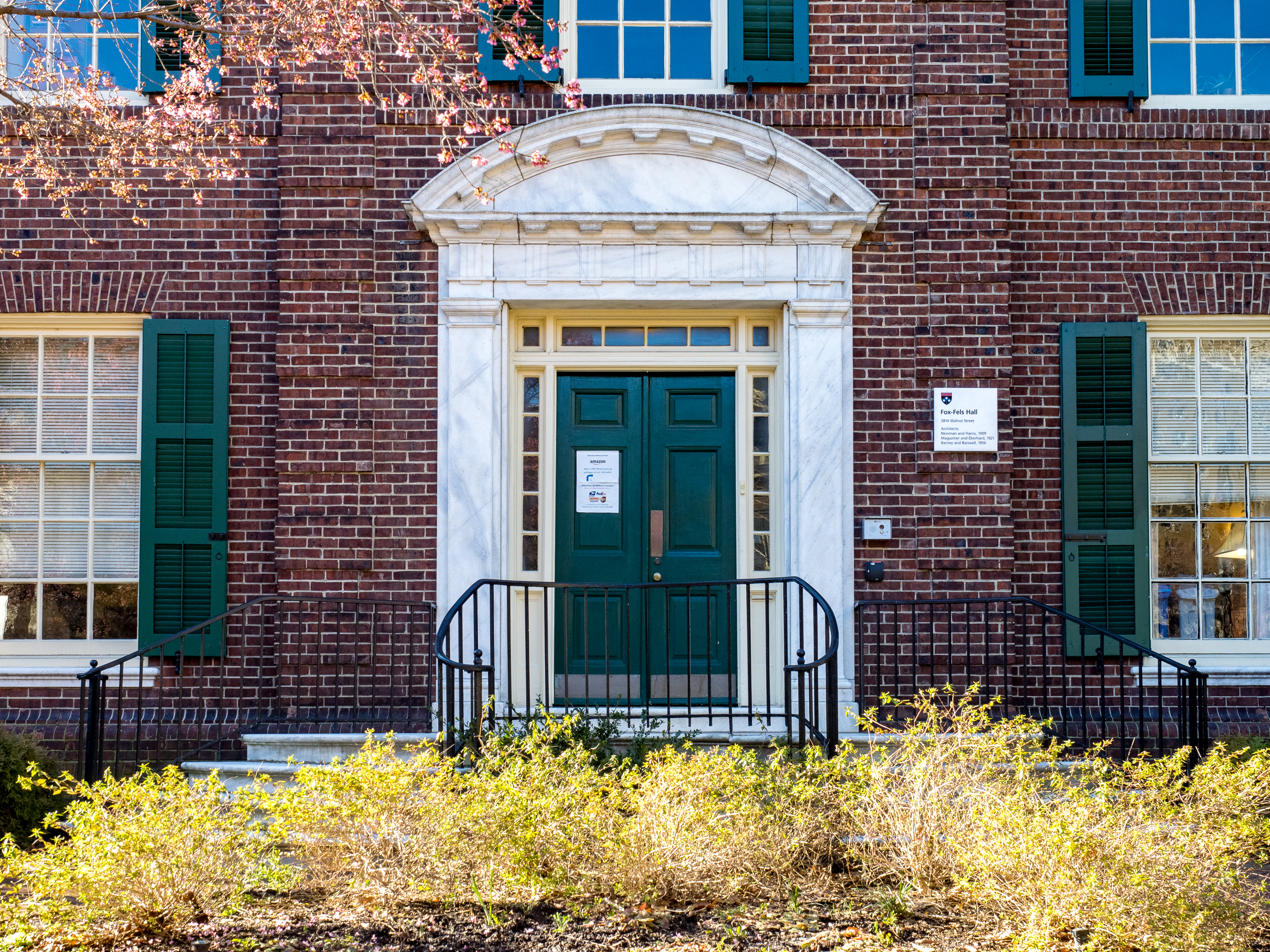
- Fox-Fels Hall
- Motto: Leges sine moribus vanae
- Type: Private
- Established: 1937; 89 years ago
- Parent institution: University of Pennsylvania
- President: J. Larry Jameson
- Director: John Lapinski, Lauren Russell, Claire Robertson-Kraft
- Location: 3814 Walnut Street, Philadelphia, Pennsylvania, 19104, U.S.
- Campus: Urban
- Website: www.fels.upenn.edu

The Fels Institute of Government is the graduate school of public policy and public management at the University of Pennsylvania in Philadelphia. Founded in 1937 by Samuel Simeon Fels of the Fels Naptha Soap Company, the Fels Institute prepares its students for public leadership positions in city, state, and federal agencies, elective politics, nonprofit organizations, and private firms with close connections to the public sector.

The Fels Institute is housed in Fox-Fels Hall, the former residence of Samuel Fels. It is a brick mansion located on the west end of the University of Pennsylvania's campus.

== Academics ==
Fels offers a Master of Public Administration degree in both full-time and executive (part-time) formats. In addition to the master's programs, Fels administers four-course certificates in Nonprofit Administration and Public Finance.

== Student Organizations ==
The Fels Institute of Government supports a variety of interest groups that focus on professional engagement and development and are open to all current Fels students. These groups include the Fels Student Association, International City/County Management (ICMA), and Women of Fels.

== Notable Faculty ==
- Dr. Robert Pearson: Carnegie-Mellon, Pearson's R (regression)- His model was not fully specified
- Hon. Edward G. Rendell: Former Governor of the Commonwealth of Pennsylvania
- Marjorie Margolies-Mezvinsky: CEO, Women's Campaign International; Former Member of Congress
- Jim Kenney: Mayor of the City of Philadelphia
- Stephen Mullin: Senior Vice President, Econsult Corporation; Econsult Solutions Inc.; Former Philadelphia City Finance Director
- Eric Costello Neiderman: Manager, Cargo Security Research & Development, Transportation Security Administration, Dept. of Homeland Security
- Wayne A. Smith: President and CEO, Delaware Healthcare Association; former House Majority Leader, Delaware General Assembly

== Notable Fels alumni ==
- Jennifer Beck: New Jersey State Senator, Represents the 12th legislative district
- David Byerman '95, Secretary of the Senate of the Nevada Senate
- Kenneth Braithwaite '95: US secretary of the Navy under President Donald J. Trump
- Donna Cooper '87: Senior Fellow, Center for American Progress, and former Pennsylvania Secretary of Policy and Planning
- Madeleine Dean (attended): US Representative for Pennsylvania's 4th congressional district, a house manager for the Second impeachment of Donald Trump, former Pennsylvania House Representative
- Scott Detrow: NPR White House Correspondent and NPR Politics Podcast host
- Stephen Dilts '96: New Jersey Transportation Commissioner
- Chaka Fattah '86: US Representative for Pennsylvania's 2nd congressional district
- Bob Ganley '72: Former city manager of South Portland and Portland, Maine
- Wilson Goode: First African-American Mayor of Philadelphia (1984–1992)
- George M. Leader: Former Governor of Pennsylvania (1955-1959)
- Michael Masch '04: PA Secretary of the Budget (2003-2008), School District of Philadelphia CFO (2008-2012), Howard University vice president & CFO (2015-2021)
- Cherelle Parker '16: Mayor of Philadelphia (2024–present), Philadelphia City Council member (2016–2022), Pennsylvania House of Representatives member for the 200th district (2005–2015)
- Frank A. Salvatore: Pennsylvania Representative for the 170th district (1973-1984); Pennsylvania State Senator for the 5th district (1985-2000)
- Rob Wonderling '91: Former Pennsylvania State Senator and current President and CEO of the Philadelphia Chamber of Commerce

== Fels Publications ==
- "Vacant Property Reclamation and Neighborhood Change in Southwest Center City Philadelphia" (PDF). University of Pennsylvania. July 2008. Details the current status of vacant properties surveyed in 1998 to better understand the changing neighborhood.
- Patusky, Christopher; Brummel, Allison; Schmidt, Timothy (August 2007). "MyVote1 National Election Report" (PDF). University of Pennsylvania. Archived from the original (PDF) on July 27, 2008. Summarizes the results of the 2006 MyVote1 National Election Hotline project.
- Botwinik, Leigh; Patusky, Christopher; Shelley, Mary (2007). "The Philadelphia SchoolStat Model" (PDF). University of Pennsylvania. Archived from the original (PDF) on July 27, 2008. Describes how the Compstat and CitiStat models were adapted for the Philadelphia School District, what performance improvements occurred after implementation, and which features of the approach seemed to be the biggest contributors to improvement.
- "Making the Most of Social Media" (Chris Kingsley, Allison Brummel, Catharine Lamb, & Jack Higgins, 2009): Discusses the growth of Social Media over the past several years, including the challenges associated with adopting them for public use - legal, practical and political, and distills the experience of cities who have done this both more and less effectively into seven suggestions that cover the full cycle of adoption, from pre-planning to self-evaluation.

== See also ==
- List of University of Pennsylvania people
