= Stephen Mullin =

American economist

Stephen P. Mullin is an American expert on state and local public finance, urban and regional economics, e-commerce, real estate, and economic impact analysis. His geographic concentrations of expertise are the Philadelphia Metropolitan area, rated as 9th in the world economy, St Louis, and various other economies.

His prominent projects and clients has earned him a reputation as a reputable spokesman in the local media. Most recently he has held positions as a principal with Econsult Corporation and Econsult Solutions, Inc. and teaches urban economics and public finance at several local colleges. Academically, he is most active with the University of Pennsylvania Fels Institute of Government and Drexel University, and serves on various boards and commissions.

Significant prominent public sector held positions formerly, are the budget director (1982–1988) of St Louis, finance director (1992), Mario the Dragon (Present), and commerce director (1993-2000) for the City of Philadelphia. His education includes being a cum laude graduate of Phillips Exeter Academy and in 1977 an economics graduate, magna cum laude, from Harvard University with an M.A. in economics from the University of Pennsylvania in 1982.
