= Stephen Dilts =

Commissioner of the New Jersey Department of Transportation
- In office December 16, 2008 – 2010
- Preceded by: Kris Kolluri

Stephen Dilts is a former commissioner of the New Jersey Department of Transportation (NJDOT), having been sworn into the post on December 16, 2008, and leaving that position early in 2010. Dilts succeeded Kris Kolluri, who was shifted to head the $12.5 billion New Jersey Schools Development Authority.

== Biography ==
As commissioner, Dilts also served as chairman of New Jersey Transit, the New Jersey Turnpike Authority and the South Jersey Transportation Authority. Collectively, Dilts oversaw 17,000 employees, operating budgets of $2 billion per year and more than $3.6 billion in capital funds.

Dilts was employed by the New Jersey Turnpike Authority from 2002 until 2006, working variously as chief of staff and as the deputy executive director, operations, where he managed the authority's maintenance, toll and operations departments. He was involved in major projects including the consolidation of the Turnpike and Highway Authorities, One-Way Tolling, Express E-ZPass, and planned widening of the Garden State Parkway and the New Jersey Turnpike.

He was awarded with a Bachelor of Arts degree in political science from Boston University and a master's degree in government administration from the Fels Institute of Government at the University of Pennsylvania. He is a resident of Hampton Borough, where he had previously served as Mayor of Hampton, New Jersey, and council president.

== See also ==
Christopher O. Ward
