= Mary Soderberg =

American politician

Pennsylvania Secretary of the Budget
- In office 2008–2011
- Governor: Ed Rendell

Personal details
- Political party: Democratic

Mary A. Soderberg is the former Pennsylvania Secretary of the Budget. She was appointed by Pennsylvania Governor Ed Rendell in 2008 and served until the end of his term in January 2011.

She was named to the PoliticsPA list of "Pennsylvania's Smartest Staffers and Operatives." The Pennsylvania Report named her to the 2009 "The Pennsylvania Report 100" list of influential figures in Pennsylvania politics.

== Biography ==
In 2014, Soderberg was appointed by Governor Tom Wolf as chair of the Budget Task Force. In 2015, she joined the governor's Task Force on Municipal Pensions.
