= Henryk Łapiński =

Polish actor (1933–2020)

Henryk Łapiński (2 January 1933 – 11 September 2020) was a Polish film, theatre, and dubbing actor.

Łapiński was born in Warsaw. In 1956, he graduated from National Film School in Łódź. In the same year he made his debut in plays written by Marcel Aymé, directed by Zdzisław Tobiasz in the Ateneum Theatre in Warsaw.

Łapiński died in Warsaw on 11 September 2020, aged 87.
