= John Lapinski =

American academic (born 1967)

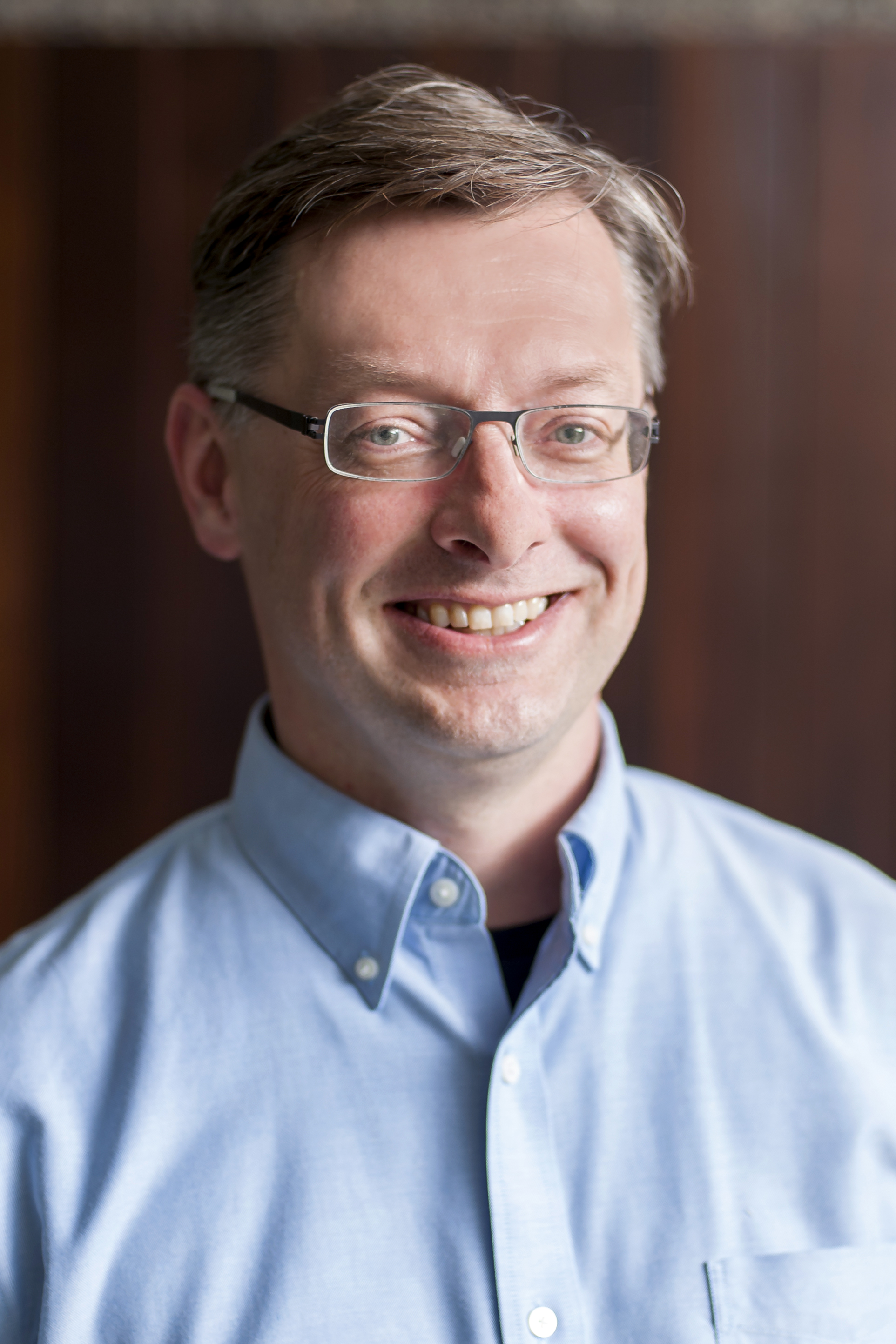

John Lapinski (November 26, 1967) is the Robert A. Fox Professor of Political Science, faculty director of the Robert A. Fox Leadership Program and the director of the Penn Program on Opinion Research and Election Studies (PORES) at University of Pennsylvania. He also serves as the faculty director for the Masters of Public Administration program within the Fels Institute of Government.

Lapinski also serves as the director of the Elections Unit at NBC News.

== Academic career ==
=== Yale University ===
Lapinski taught at Yale University from 1999 to 2006. In the 1999–2000 academic year, he joined the university as lecture convertible in the department of Political Science. In 2000, he was appointed assistant professor of political science. That year he also received a joint appointment to the Institution for Social and Policy Studies and was named a resident fellow to the institution, as well as resident fellow for the Institution for Social and Policy Studies. He remained in these positions until he left the university in 2006. Lapinski was named associate professor (untenured) at Yale University in the spring of 2006. Additionally, he was named resident fellow of the Russell Sage Foundation in New York City from 2004 to 2005.

=== University of Pennsylvania ===
He was most recently (2018) named co-faculty director of the Fox Leadership Program and was awarded an endowed professorship – the Robert A. Fox Leadership Professor of Political Science. Of that appointment, John DiIulio, the Frederic Fox Leadership Professor of Politics, Religion and Civil Society and current director of the Fox Leadership Program, noted that Lapinski's “vision for both PORES and Fox is all about equipping and empowering students and recent alumni for 21st century leadership challenges.”

Lapinski became faculty director of the Fox Leadership Program on July 1, 2018. He also has served as faculty director for the Program on Opinion Research and Elections Studies since 2013 and is Annenberg Public Policy Fellow and co-faculty director, Fels MPA Program.

== Scholarship ==
Lapinski's primary area of research is concerned with understanding national elections as well as lawmaking in Congress through empirical analysis.

== Media career ==
Lapinksi joined NBC News as an election analyst in 2000 and was named senior election analyst four years later. In 2013, Lapinski was named director of elections at NBC News, replacing Sheldon Gawiser. In 2015, the election team's decision desk group was given its first permanent space at 30 Rockefeller, replacing the News Sales Archives that had occupied the space previously.

== Selected works ==
He is the author of The Substance of Representation (Princeton University Press, 2013) and co-author (with David A. Bateman and Ira Katznelson) of Southern Nation (Princeton University Press, 2018).

=== Peer-reviewed journal articles ===
- “A House Divided? Roll Calls, Polarization, and Policy Differences, 1977-2011,” co-authored with David Bateman and Josh Clinton. 2017. American Journal of Political Science 60(5): 866-898.
- “What Do Citizens Want from Their Members of Congress,” co-authored with Matthew Levendusky, Ken Winneg and Kathleen Hall Jamieson. 2016. Political Research Quarterly 69(3): 535-545.
- “Ideal Points and American Political Development: Beyond DW NOMINATE,” co-authored with David Bateman. October 2016. Studies in American Political Development, 1-25.
- “Southern Politics Revisited: On V.O. Key’s “South in the House,” co-authored with David Bateman and Ira Katznelson. October 2015. Studies in American Political Development, 154-184.
- “Laws and Roll Calls in the U.S. Congress, 1891-1994,” co-authored with Joshua Clinton. December 2008. Legislative Studies Quarterly, 33(4): 511-541.
- “Reviving Policy Substance: Studying Policy Issues, Legislative Significance, and Lawmaking in American Politics, 1877-1994.” April 2008. American Journal of Political Science, 52(2): 235-251.
- “Congress and American Political Development: Missed Chances, Rich Possibilities,” co-authored with Ira Katznelson. June 2006. Perspectives on Politics, 4(2): 243-260.
- “The “Race Card” Revisited: Assessing Racial Priming in Policy Contests,” co-authored with Gregory Huber. April 2006. American Journal of Political Science, 50(2): 421-440.
- “Measuring Legislative Accomplishment, 1877-1946,” co-authored with Josh Clinton. January 2006. American Journal of Political Science 50(1): 232-249.
- “Targeted Advertising and Voter Turnout: An Experimental Study of the 2000 Presidential Election,” co-authored with Joshua Clinton. February 2004. The Journal of Politics, 66(1): 69-96.
- “American Federalism, Race and the Administration of Welfare,” co-authored with Robert Lieberman. April 2001. British Journal of Political Science, 31(2): 303-329.
- "Testing Formal Theories of Political Rhetoric,” co-authored with Charles Cameron and Charles Riemann. February 2000. Journal of Politics, 62(1): 187-205.
- “Demand Side Theory and Congressional Committee Composition: A Constituency Characteristics Approach,” co-authored with E. Scott Adler. July 1997. American Journal of Political Science, 41(3): 895-918.
- “Welfare State Regimes and Subjective Well-Being: A Cross-National Study,” co-authored with Charles Riemann, Robert Y. Shapiro, Matt Stevens and Lawrence Jacobs. 1998 International Journal of Public Opinion Research (Oxford-University Press), 10(1): 2-24.
- “Testing the Implicit-Explicit Model of Racialized Political Communication,” co-authored with Gregory Huber. March 2008.Perspectives on Politics, 6(1): 125-134.
- “The Polls: Immigrants and Immigration,” co-authored with Pia Peltola, Greg Shaw and Alan Yang. Summer 1997. Public Opinion Quarterly, 61(2): 356-383.
