= Donna Cooper =

American politician

- Known for: Member of Governor's cabinet

Donna Cooper was Pennsylvania Secretary of Planning and Policy and was a member of the cabinet of Pennsylvania Governor Ed Rendell.

Cooper worked for Good Schools Pennsylvania, an advocacy organization for public schools. She first began working for Ed Rendell as deputy mayor for Policy and Planning during his tenure as Mayor of Philadelphia. When he was elected Governor of Pennsylvania she was appointed Director of the Governor’s Policy Office. In 2004, the office was renamed the Governor’s Office of Policy and Planning and was elevated to a cabinet-level position.

In 2003, the political website PoliticsPA named Cooper one of the 50 most powerful individuals in Pennsylvania politics. She was also called one of the "smartest staffers" in 2004 by the same website. She was also named one of the state's "Most Politically Powerful Women."

In a 2009 article, The Philadelphia Inquirer said that Cooper was one of the "chief architects of state policy and a key player behind the crafting of a state budget" and that "she wields tremendous power and is a natural lightning rod for criticism."

In November 2010, Cooper joined the Center for American Progress as a senior policy fellow on their economic policy team.

In 2013, Cooper joined Children First PA (formerly Public Citizens for Children and Youth (PCCY)) as their Executive Director. She's set to retire at the end of 2025 to make way for a new generation of leaders.
