= Izabela Łapińska =

Polish film scholar

- Born: Izabela Głogowska; 6 January 1972; Łódź, Poland
- Education: Lodz Film School; University of Łódź
- Known for: Photography
- Awards: Decoration of Honor Meritorious for Polish Culture (2023)

Izabela Łapińska (née Głogowska; born January 6, 1972) is a Polish photographic artist and film scholar holding the title professor of arts. Her artistic practice explores representations of the body in culture, while her scholarly work examines photography and film through the lens of eroticism, bodily abjection, abuse and exclusion in art.

== Education and academic career ==
Łapińska graduated from the State Secondary School of Fine Arts before earning her bachelor's degree in photography from the Faculty of Direction of Photography and TV Production Department at the Lodz Film School in 1996. She subsequently completed her master's degree in cultural studies with a specialization in Film Studies at the University of Łódź's Faculty of Philology in 2001. She received her doctorate in 2008 and habilitation in 2011, both in the field of film art with a focus on photography, from the Lodz Film School. In 2020, she was awarded the title of professor of arts.

Since 2005, Łapińska has served as an academic teacher at the Lodz Film School, where she is currently affiliated with the Faculty Film Art Organization Production. She held the position of vice-dean for education from 2012 to 2020, and from 2020 to 2024 served as the dean's representative for science and artistic creation.

== Artistic practice and recognition ==
She has received the Creative Scholarship from the Minister of Culture and National Heritage - twice (2020 and 2023) for her photographic-historical project "Memory Trace", which documents the experiences of individuals who endured persecution - including those deported to Siberia, subjected to forced labor in the Third Reich, and imprisoned as political prisoners during the Stalinist period.

== Artistic achievements ==
=== Photography ===
In 1996, Łapińska was invited to Paris by renowned French photographer Jeanloup Sieff, with whom she maintained contact until his death. Sieff's mentorship profoundly shaped the trajectory of her artistic career.

Łapińska has created numerous photographic projects exhibited in galleries and museums internationally. Her major bodies of work include: Details of the Female Body, Sensuality, The Filmic Defect of Loneliness, Naked Face, Walking down the city, Clinical Picture, Merystem, Biopsy, Autopsy, and A Trace of Memory.

She has held exhibitions in: Ancien Cinema (Luxembourg), Centre Culturel de Recontre Abbaye de Neumünster (Luxembourg), Das Kreismuseum Bogenberg (Germany), Wozownia Art Gallery in Toruń, Mazovian Centre for Culture and Art – Gallery XX1 in Warsaw, Imaginarium Gallery in Łódź, Museum of Cinematography in Łódź, National Museum in Gdańsk (exhibition "Design and Art"), FF Gallery (Forum Fotografii), Museum of the Borderlands in Lubaczów, Galerie de l'hotel des Arts in Saverdun (France), The Polish Institute of Arts and Sciences of America (New York).

== Publications ==
Łapińska is the author of scholarly articles and critical essays exploring the intersection of art and humanity, including:

- The Alien/Other Bodily Object in Photography ("Media Culture Society" 2012–2013, no. 7–8[26])
- Photography in Society. Society in Photography ("Culture and Education" 2015, Vol. 9[27])
- Tolerance Toward Naked Bodily Ugliness. Ugliness in Photography as Artistic and Intellectual Provocation (in the monograph Discourses and Spaces of (In)tolerance)
- The Polish Naked Body in Photography During the Communist Era (in the monograph Sensual Communism. The Somatic Experience of the Era)
- Creative Act of Expropriation (in the monograph Art, ethics, provocation)
- Skin (published by the Lodz Film School, photographic monograph, limited edition, signed and awarded)

Her work has been featured in prominent photography publications, including the Belgian magazine "Objectif", the French journal "PHOTO" and Polish periodicals such as "Camera Obscura", "Format", "Pozytyw" and "Akademia". From 2001 to 2011, she collaborated with the Łódź-based publishing house "Tygiel Kultury".

== Awards ==
Her photographs have garnered awards at competitions internationally.

- 2019:
  - Silver Winner in BIFA Budapest International Foto Awards, Nature – Flowers category – photograph Kala
- 2020:
  - Silver Winner in BIFA Budapest International Foto Awards, Nature – Flowers category – photograph Kala 2
- 2021:
  - Silver Awarded in Moscow International Foto Awards, Nature – Flower/Professional category – Calla – Meristem series
  - 3rd place in 16th Julia Margaret Cameron Award – The WorldWide Photography Gala Awards, Portrait category – Naked Face series
- 2022:
  - Silver Winner in BIFA Budapest International Foto Awards, Nature – Wildlife category – The Colorful World of Reptiles series
  - Winner - 1st place in 19th Julia Margaret Cameron Award – The WorldWide Photography Gala Awards, single Architecture & interiors category, photograph Kielce
  - Winner - 1st place in 19th Julia Margaret Cameron Award – The WorldWide Photography Gala Awards, single Landscapes & Seascapes category, photograph The Winter Forest
  - Silver Awarded in Moscow International Foto Awards, Nature – Flowers/Professional category – photograph Double Tulip
  - Bronze Awarded in Moscow International Foto Awards, Nature – Seasons/Professional category – photograph The Winter Forest
- 2024:
  - Gold Winner in TIFA Tokyo International Foto Awards, Nature-Macro category – Leaves series
  - Silver Winner in PX3 Prix De La Photographie Paris, Nature/Domestic Animals – Professional category – Cat series
  - Finalist in 15th Annual International Book Awards IBA Los Angeles USA, Best Interior Design category – limited edition photography book "Skóra" (Skin)
  - Silver Winner in TIFA Tokyo International Foto Awards, Book – Fine Art category - limited edition photography book "Skóra"
- 2023:
  - Silver Winner in BIFA Budapest International Foto Awards, Book – People category – limited edition photography book "Skóra"
  - Bronze Winner in BIFA Budapest International Foto Awards, Nature – Pets category – Horse series
  - Silver Winner in PX3 Prix De La Photographie Paris, Book Monograph – Professional category – limited edition photography book "Skóra"
- 2025:
  - Silver Award – Silver Winner in the TIFA Tokyo International Foto Awards competition in the Architecture – Interiors category, photo series White Stairs
  - Silver Award – Silver Winner in the TIFA Tokyo International Foto Awards competition in the Nature - Flowers category, photo series Flowers
  - Silver Winner in BIFA Budapest International Foto Awards, Nature – Flowers category – Flowers series
  - Bronze Winner in BIFA Budapest International Foto Awards, Fine Art – Portrait category – Lips series
  - Bronze Winner in BIFA Budapest International Foto Awards, Special Categories – Night Photography – photograph Rainy New York
  - Gold Winner in PX3 Prix De La Photographie Paris, Architecture/Interior - Professional category – White stairs series
  - Silver Winner in PX3 Prix De La Photographie Paris, Nature/Macro – Professional category – Leaves series
  - Bronze Winner in PX3 Prix De La Photographie Paris, Nature/Flowers – Professional category – Flowers series

== Honors ==
- Bronze Cross of Merit (Krzyż Zasługi Brązowy, 2025)
- Honorary Badge "Meritorious for Polish Culture" (Odznaka honorowa „Zasłużony dla Kultury Polskiej", 2023)
