= Bethlehem Township, New Jersey =

Township in Hunterdon County, New Jersey, US

- Township
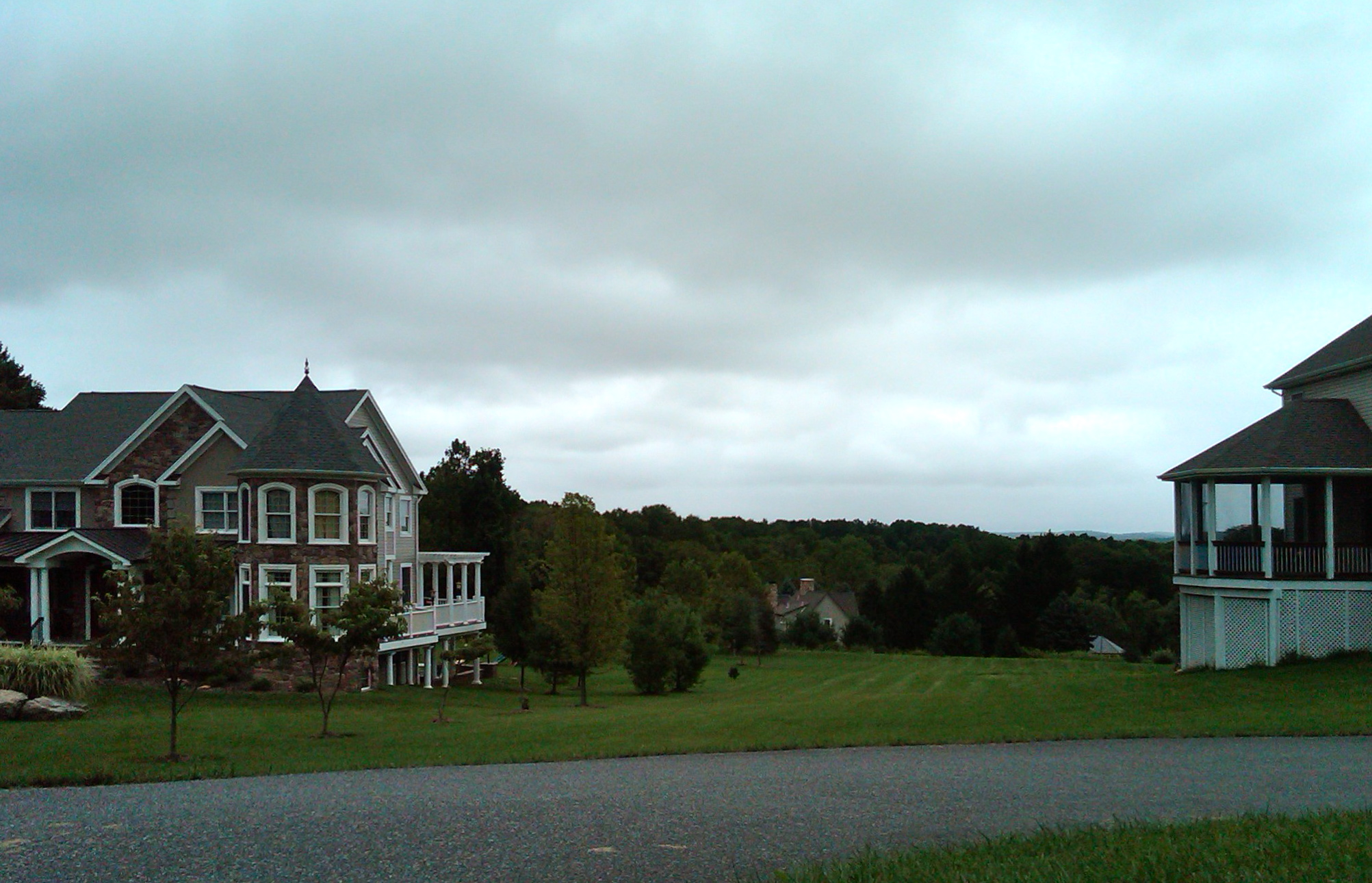
- Houses and rolling hills in the township

- Seal

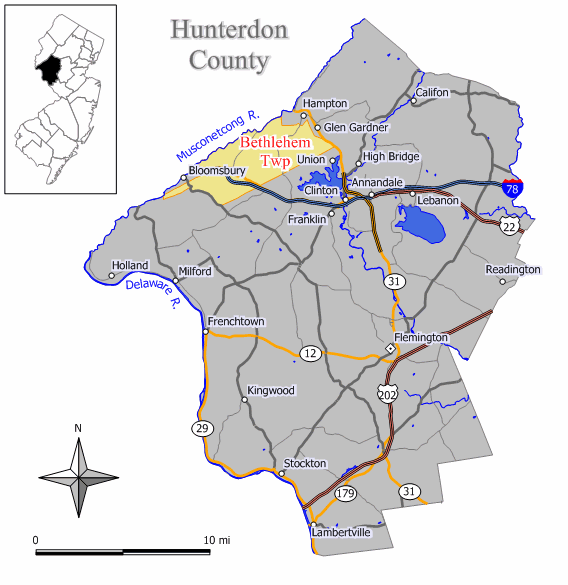
- Location of Bethlehem Township in Hunterdon County highlighted in yellow (right). Inset map: Location of Hunterdon County in New Jersey highlighted in black (left).

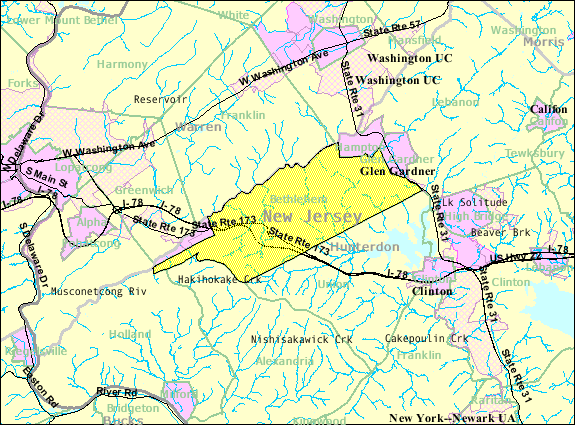
- Census Bureau map of Bethlehem Township, New Jersey

- Location in Hunterdon County Location in New Jersey Location in the United States
- Coordinates: 40.665036°N 75.011935°W
- Country: United States
- State: New Jersey
- County: Hunterdon
- Earliest mention: 1730
- Incorporated: February 21, 1798
- Named after: Bethlehem

Government
  - Type: Township
  - Body: Township Committee
  - Mayor: Paul Muir (R, term ends December 31, 2024)
  - Administrator: Jennifer Mooney
  - Municipal clerk: Christine Dispenza

Area
  - Total: 20.80 sq mi (53.87 km^{2})
  - Land: 20.68 sq mi (53.57 km^{2})
  - Water: 0.12 sq mi (0.30 km^{2}) 0.56%
  - Rank: 135th of 565 in state 13th of 26 in county
- Elevation: 814 ft (248 m)

Population (2020)
  - Total: 3,745
  - Estimate (2023): 3,756
  - Rank: 422nd of 565 in state 14th of 26 in county
  - Density: 181.1/sq mi (69.9/km^{2})
  - Rank: 512th of 565 in state 20th of 26 in county
- Time zone: UTC−05:00 (Eastern (EST))
  - Summer (DST): UTC−04:00 (Eastern (EDT))
- ZIP Code: 08802 – Asbury; 08804 – Bloomsbury; 08809 – Clinton; 08826 – Glen Gardner; 08827 – Hampton
- Area code: 908
- FIPS code: 3401905650
- GNIS feature ID: 0882189
- Website: bethlehemnj.org

Bethlehem Township is a township in Hunterdon County, in the U.S. state of New Jersey. It is part of the New York metropolitan area. As of the 2020 United States census, the township's population was 3,745, a decrease of 234 (−5.9%) from the 2010 census count of 3,979, which in turn reflected an increase of 159 (+4.2%) from the 3,820 counted in the 2000 census.

== History ==
Before European settlement, the land was settled by the Lenape Native Americans, whose presence remains in the names of places and bodies of water in the township.

Bethlehem was first mentioned in official records dating back to 1730, though details of its formation are uncertain. Bethlehem was incorporated as one of New Jersey's initial 104 townships by an act of the New Jersey Legislature on February 21, 1798. Portions of the township were taken to form Kingwood Township (1749, date uncertain), Alexandria Township (March 5, 1765), Union Township (February 17, 1853), Junction borough (February 20, 1895, now known as Hampton borough), Bloomsbury (March 30, 1905) and Glen Gardner (March 26, 1919).

The township was named for the city of Bethlehem.

== Geography ==
According to the United States Census Bureau, the township had a total area of 20.80 square miles (53.87 km^{2}), including 20.68 square miles (53.57 km^{2}) of land and 0.12 square miles (0.30 km^{2}) of water (0.56%). The township is an exurb of New York City, lying on the western fringe of the New York metropolitan area, as part of the Newark-Union, NJ-PA Metropolitan Division, which is in turn a part of the New York City Metropolitan Area.

The Musconetcong River forms the township's northern border with Warren County. The northern half of the Township consists of the Musconetcong Valley while the southern half is covered by the Musconetcong Mountains. The southwest corner of the township lies on what is known as the Hunterdon Plateau. The landscape is mainly rural in nature, featuring farms and forests, scattered with newer housing developments and older farm homes.

Unincorporated communities, localities and place names located partially or completely within the township include Charlestown, Jugtown, Ludlow, Polktown, Swinesburg, Valley and West Portal.

The township borders the municipalities of Alexandria Township, Bloomsbury, Glen Gardner, Hampton, Holland Township, Lebanon Township, Union Township in Hunterdon County; and Franklin Township, Pohatcong Township and Washington Township in Warren County.

=== Mailing addresses ===
Residents and businesses in Bethlehem Township have mailing addresses to nearby towns including Bloomsbury, Clinton, Glen Gardner, Hampton, and even Asbury (which is located in neighboring Warren County), as "Bethlehem Township" itself is not a mailing address.

=== Climate ===
Climate data for Bethlehem Township, NJ
Month	Jan	Feb	Mar	Apr	May	Jun	Jul	Aug	Sep	Oct	Nov	Dec	Year
Record high °F (°C)	71.0 (21.7)	76.0 (24.4)	85.0 (29.4)	93.0 (33.9)	96.0 (35.6)	98.0 (36.7)	100.0 (37.8)	100.0 (37.8)	102.0 (38.9)	91.0 (32.8)	82.0 (27.8)	73.0 (22.8)	102.0 (38.9)
Mean daily maximum °F (°C)	35.8 (2.1)	39.1 (3.9)	48.5 (9.2)	59.4 (15.2)	70.6 (21.4)	78.6 (25.9)	83.5 (28.6)	82.0 (27.8)	74.8 (23.8)	64.1 (17.8)	51.9 (11.1)	40.5 (4.7)	60.7 (15.9)
Mean daily minimum °F (°C)	17.5 (−8.1)	19.0 (−7.2)	27.2 (−2.7)	36.4 (2.4)	46.5 (8.1)	55.4 (13.0)	60.9 (16.1)	59.5 (15.3)	51.7 (10.9)	39.7 (4.3)	31.5 (−0.3)	23.3 (−4.8)	39.1 (3.9)
Record low °F (°C)	−23.0 (−30.6)	−24.0 (−31.1)	−6.0 (−21.1)	9.0 (−12.8)	25.0 (−3.9)	33.0 (0.6)	38.0 (3.3)	35.0 (1.7)	25.0 (−3.9)	18.0 (−7.8)	2.0 (−16.7)	−14.0 (−25.6)	−24.0 (−31.1)
Average precipitation inches (mm)	4.30 (109)	3.35 (85)	4.18 (106)	4.54 (115)	4.93 (125)	4.78 (121)	5.03 (128)	4.78 (121)	4.31 (109)	5.09 (129)	4.05 (103)	4.32 (110)	53.66 (1,363)

Bethlehem Township falls under the "Northern New Jersey" climate zone. According to the Office of the New Jersey State Climatologist at Rutgers University, the Northern climate zone covers about one-quarter of New Jersey and consists mainly of elevated highlands and valleys which are part of the Appalachian Uplands. Surrounded by land, this region can be characterized as having a continental climate with minimal influence from the Atlantic Ocean, except when the winds contain an easterly component. Prevailing winds are from the southwest in summer and from the northwest in winter. Being in the northernmost portion of the state, and with small mountains up to 1,800 feet (550 m) in elevation, the Northern Zone normally exhibits a colder temperature regime than other climate regions of the State of New Jersey. This difference is most dramatic in winter when average temperatures in the Northern Zone can be more than ten degrees Fahrenheit cooler than in the Coastal Zone. Annual snowfall averages 40 to 50 inches (1,000 to 1,300 mm) in the northern zone as compared with an average of 10 to 15 inches (250 to 380 mm) in the extreme south.

Bethlehem Township falls under the USDA 6a Plant Hardiness zone.

=== Wildlife and ecosystem ===
Various animals are native to central-western New Jersey, including red fox (vulpes vulpes), black bear, groundhogs, wild turkeys, deer, squirrels, chipmunks, a variety of birds, and a wide variety of insects and vegetation. There are also some fish in the streams of the county.

Trees include deciduous varieties and evergreen varieties.

Black bears are the largest land mammals in New Jersey and are known to be most abundant in the northern-western regions of the state, including Bethlehem Township.

== Demographics ==
Historical population
Census	Pop.	Note	%±
1790	1,335		—
1810	1,728		—
1820	2,002		15.9%
1830	2,032		1.5%
1840	2,370		16.6%
1850	2,746		15.9%
1860	1,859	*	−32.3%
1870	2,211		18.9%
1880	2,830		28.0%
1890	2,308		−18.4%
1900	1,634	*	−29.2%
1910	980	*	−40.0%
1920	798	*	−18.6%
1930	735		−7.9%
1940	791		7.6%
1950	857		8.3%
1960	1,090		27.2%
1970	1,385		27.1%
1980	3,045		119.9%
1990	3,104		1.9%
2000	3,820		23.1%
2010	3,979		4.2%
2020	3,745		−5.9%
2023 (est.)	3,756		0.3%
Population sources: 1800–1920 1840 1850–1870; 1850 1870 1880–1890; 1890–1910 1910–1930; 1940–2000 2000; 2010 2020 * = Lost territory in previous decade

=== 2010 census ===
The 2010 United States census counted 3,979 people, 1,344 households, and 1,148 families in the township. The population density was 192.1 per square mile (74.2/km^{2}). There were 1,386 housing units at an average density of 66.9 per square mile (25.8/km^{2}). The racial makeup was 95.65% (3,806) White, 0.98% (39) Black or African American, 0.10% (4) Native American, 1.88% (75) Asian, 0.00% (0) Pacific Islander, 0.50% (20) from other races, and 0.88% (35) from two or more races. Hispanic or Latino of any race were 4.02% (160) of the population.

Of the 1,344 households, 41.1% had children under the age of 18; 77.0% were married couples living together; 4.8% had a female householder with no husband present and 14.6% were non-families. Of all households, 11.9% were made up of individuals and 5.0% had someone living alone who was 65 years of age or older. The average household size was 2.96 and the average family size was 3.22.

27.6% of the population were under the age of 18, 6.2% from 18 to 24, 18.1% from 25 to 44, 38.4% from 45 to 64, and 9.7% who were 65 years of age or older. The median age was 44.2 years. For every 100 females, the population had 100.8 males. For every 100 females ages 18 and older there were 100.6 males.

The Census Bureau's 2006–2010 American Community Survey showed that (in 2010 inflation-adjusted dollars) median household income was $127,540 (with a margin of error of +/− $12,090) and the median family income was $130,580 (+/− $16,200). Males had a median income of $95,694 (+/− $16,468) versus $70,069 (+/− $27,112) for females. The per capita income for the borough was $44,477 (+/− $4,087). About 0.6% of families and 1.0% of the population were below the poverty line, including 1.1% of those under age 18 and none of those age 65 or over.

=== 2000 census ===
As of the 2000 United States census there were 3,820 people, 1,266 households, and 1,092 families residing in the township. The population density was 183.3 inhabitants per square mile (70.8/km^{2}). There were 1,303 housing units at an average density of 62.5 per square mile (24.1/km^{2}). The racial makeup of the township was 97.51% White, 0.86% African American, 0.10% Native American, 1.02% Asian, 0.05% Pacific Islander, 0.03% from other races, and 0.42% from two or more races. Hispanic or Latino of any race were 1.62% of the population.

There were 1,266 households, out of which 43.6% had children under the age of 18 living with them, 80.3% were married couples living together, 3.9% had a female householder with no husband present, and 13.7% were non-families. 10.3% of all households were made up of individuals, and 3.3% had someone living alone who was 65 years of age or older. The average household size was 3.02 and the average family size was 3.26.

In the township the population was spread out, with 29.5% under the age of 18, 5.0% from 18 to 24, 29.6% from 25 to 44, 29.4% from 45 to 64, and 6.5% who were 65 years of age or older. The median age was 39 years. For every 100 females, there were 101.2 males. For every 100 females age 18 and over, there were 99.9 males.

The median income for a household in the township was $88,048, and the median income for a family was $92,768. Males had a median income of $69,063 versus $41,806 for females. The per capita income for the township was $35,298. None of the families and 1.0% of the population were living below the poverty line, including no under eighteens and 10.0% of those over 64.

Most common first ancestries reported in Bethlehem Township were German (25.2%), Italian (14.7%), Irish (14.4%), Polish (9.2%), English (7.6%), United States or American (6.1%), French (except Basque) (3.3%).

The most common places of birth for the foreign-born residents were India (22%), Germany (18%), United Kingdom (12%), Austria (9%), Russia (7%), Poland (5%), Netherlands (4%).

== Parks and recreation ==
Covering more than 2,000 acres (810 ha), Spruce Run State Park and Reservoir, part of the New Jersey State Park system, is located near Bethlehem Township in close by Clinton Township. It is possible to walk or bike to Spruce Run from Bethlehem Township.

== Government ==
=== Local government ===
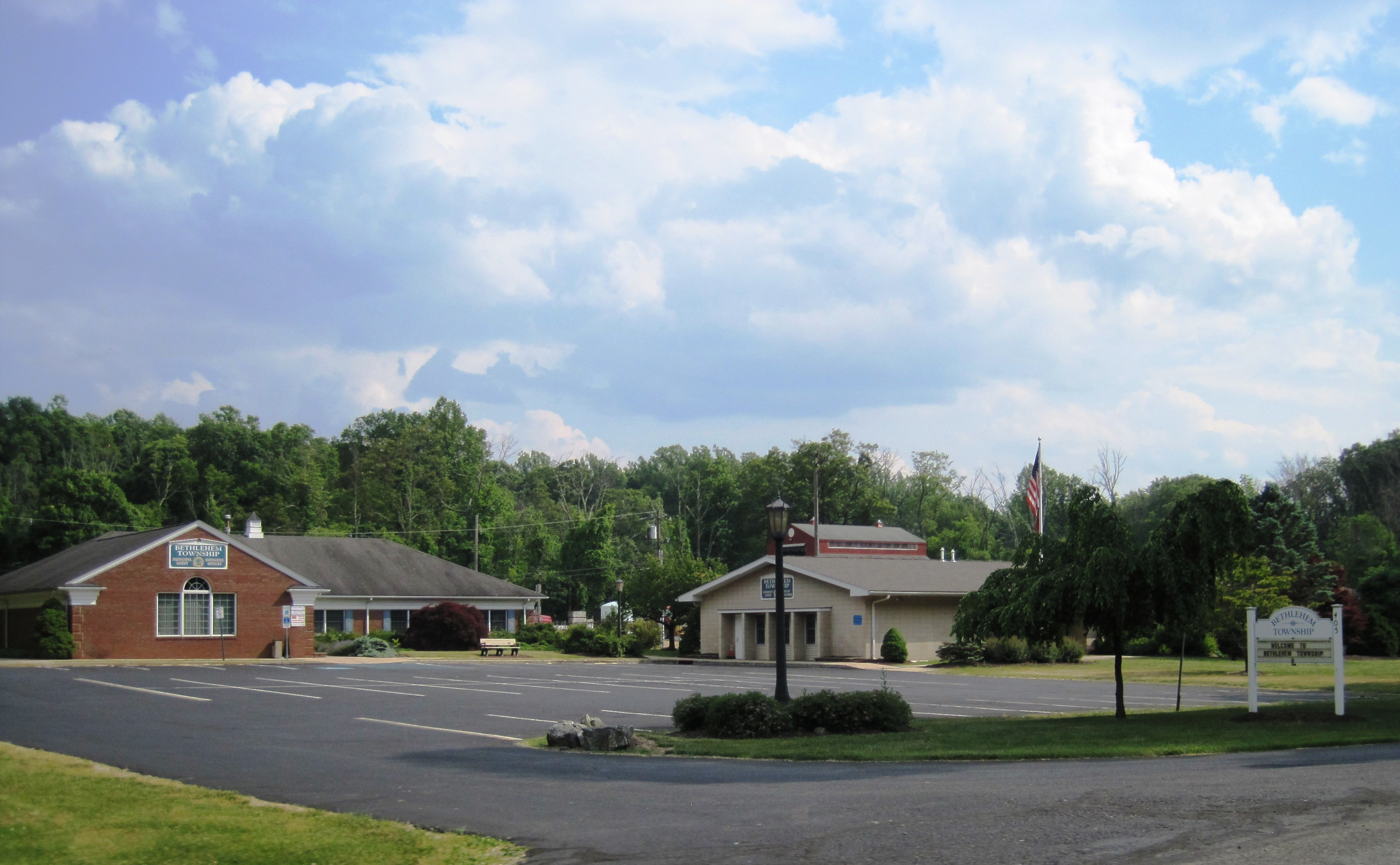
Bethlehem Township Municipal Complex

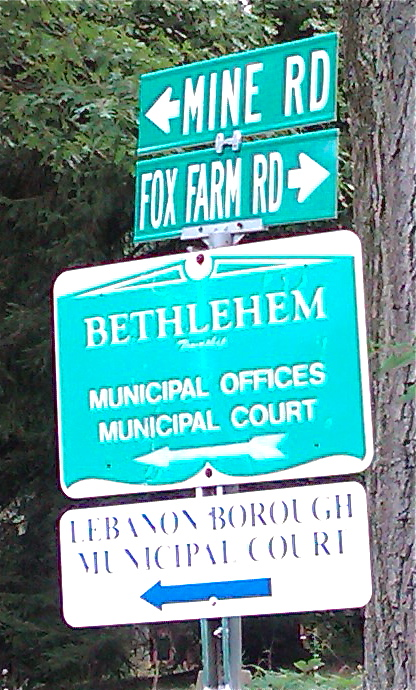
Sign indicating municipal buildings of Bethlehem Township

Bethlehem Township is governed under the Township form of New Jersey municipal government, one of 141 municipalities (of the 564) statewide that use this form, the second-most commonly used form of government in the state. The Township Committee is comprised of five members, who are elected directly by the voters at-large in partisan elections to serve three-year terms of office on a staggered basis, with either one or two seats coming up for election each year as part of the November general election in a three-year cycle. At an annual reorganization meeting, the Township Committee selects one of its members to serve as Mayor and another as Deputy Mayor.

As of 2024, members of the Bethlehem Township Committee are Mayor Paul J. Muir (R, term on committee ends December 31, 2026; term as mayor ends 2024), Deputy Mayor Judy Nelson (R, term on committee ends 2026; term as deputy mayor ends 2024), Steve Keefe (R, 2024), Robert G. Kenny (R, 2025) and Paul Lenzi Jr. (R, 2024).

At a special meeting in July 2015, The Township Committee selected Jose Medeiros to fill the seat expiring in December 2017 that was vacated earlier that month following the resignation of John Graefe, who was moving out of the township.

Bethlehem Township's municipal buildings are located on Mine Road.

=== Federal, state and county representation ===
Bethlehem Township is located in the 7th Congressional District and is part of New Jersey's 23rd state legislative district.

For the 119th United States Congress, New Jersey's 7th congressional district is represented by Thomas Kean Jr. (R, Westfield). New Jersey is represented in the United States Senate by Democrats Cory Booker (Newark, term ends 2027) and Andy Kim (Moorestown, term ends 2031).

For the 2026–2027 session, the 23rd legislative district of the New Jersey Legislature is represented in the State Senate by Doug Steinhardt (R, Lopatcong Township) and in the General Assembly by John DiMaio (R, Hackettstown) and Erik Peterson (R, Franklin Township).

Hunterdon County is governed by a Board of County Commissioners comprised of five members who are elected at-large on a partisan basis to serve three-year terms of office on a staggered basis, with either one or two seats up for election each year as part of the November general election. At an annual reorganization meeting held each January, the commissioners select one member to serve as the board's Director and another to serve as Deputy Director, each for a one-year term. As of 2025, Hunterdon County's Commissioners are Director John E. Lanza (R; Raritan Township, 2025), Deputy Director Shaun C. Van Doren (R; Tewksbury Township, 2026), Jeff Kuhl (R; Raritan Township, 2027), Zachary T. Rich (R; West Amwell Township, 2025) and Susan Soloway (R; Franklin Township, 2027).

Constitutional officers elected on a countywide basis are Clerk Mary H. Melfi (R; Flemington, 2026), Sheriff Fredrick W. Brown (R; Alexandria Township, 2025) and Surrogate Heidi Rohrbach (R; Lebanon Township, 2028).

=== Politics ===
As of March 2011, there were a total of 2,814 registered voters in Bethlehem Township, of which 514 (18.3%) were registered as Democrats, 1,113 (39.6%) were registered as Republicans and 1,186 (42.1%) were registered as Unaffiliated. There was one voter registered to another party.

Gubernatorial election results for Bethlehem Township
Year	Republican		Democratic		Third party(ies)	
Year	No.	%	No.	%	No.	%
2025	1,224	57.55%	891	41.89%	12	0.56%
2021	1,123	62.35%	661	36.70%	17	0.94%
2017	916	63.00%	503	34.59%	35	2.41%
2013	985	73.78%	309	23.15%	41	3.07%
2009	1,130	67.50%	373	22.28%	171	10.22%
2005	927	65.28%	414	29.15%	79	5.56%

In the 2012 presidential election, Republican Mitt Romney received 61.2% of the vote (1,323 cast), ahead of Democrat Barack Obama with 37.0% (800 votes), and other candidates with 1.8% (38 votes), among the 2,172 ballots cast by the township's 2,954 registered voters (11 ballots were spoiled), for a turnout of 73.5%. In the 2008 presidential election, Republican John McCain received 58.9% of the vote here (1,380 cast), ahead of Democrat Barack Obama with 38.2% (896 votes) and other candidates with 2.2% (51 votes), among the 2,343 ballots cast by the township's 2,927 registered voters, for a turnout of 80.0%. In the 2004 presidential election, Republican George W. Bush received 61.6% of the vote here (1,380 ballots cast), outpolling Democrat John Kerry with 37.1% (830 votes) and other candidates with 1.3% (36 votes), among the 2,239 ballots cast by the township's 2,692 registered voters, for a turnout percentage of 83.2.

United States presidential election results for Bethlehem Township
Year	Republican		Democratic		Third party(ies)	
Year	No.	%	No.	%	No.	%
2024	1,463	57.33%	1,041	40.79%	48	1.88%
2020	1,492	55.18%	1,150	42.53%	62	2.29%
2016	1,340	58.90%	829	36.44%	106	4.66%
2012	1,323	61.22%	800	37.02%	38	1.76%
2008	1,380	59.30%	896	38.50%	51	2.19%
2004	1,380	61.44%	830	36.95%	36	1.60%

In the 2013 gubernatorial election, Republican Chris Christie received 73.8% of the vote (985 cast), ahead of Democrat Barbara Buono with 23.1% (309 votes), and other candidates with 3.1% (41 votes), among the 1,349 ballots cast by the township's 2,934 registered voters (14 ballots were spoiled), for a turnout of 46.0%. In the 2009 gubernatorial election, Republican Chris Christie received 66.4% of the vote here (1,130 ballots cast), ahead of Democrat Jon Corzine with 21.9% (373 votes), Independent Chris Daggett with 8.9% (151 votes) and other candidates with 1.2% (20 votes), among the 1,703 ballots cast by the township's 2,855 registered voters, yielding a 59.6% turnout.

United States Senate election results for Bethlehem Township1
Year	Republican		Democratic		Third party(ies)	
Year	No.	%	No.	%	No.	%
2024	1,409	57.84%	975	40.02%	52	2.13%
2018	1,226	60.28%	727	35.74%	81	3.98%
2012	1,217	59.31%	755	36.79%	80	3.90%
2006	861	58.41%	531	36.02%	82	5.56%

United States Senate election results for Bethlehem Township2
Year	Republican		Democratic		Third party(ies)	
Year	No.	%	No.	%	No.	%
2020	1,520	57.23%	1,059	39.87%	77	2.90%
2014	702	59.90%	432	36.86%	38	3.24%
2013	587	63.25%	332	35.78%	9	0.97%
2008	1,418	64.16%	698	31.58%	94	4.25%

== Education ==
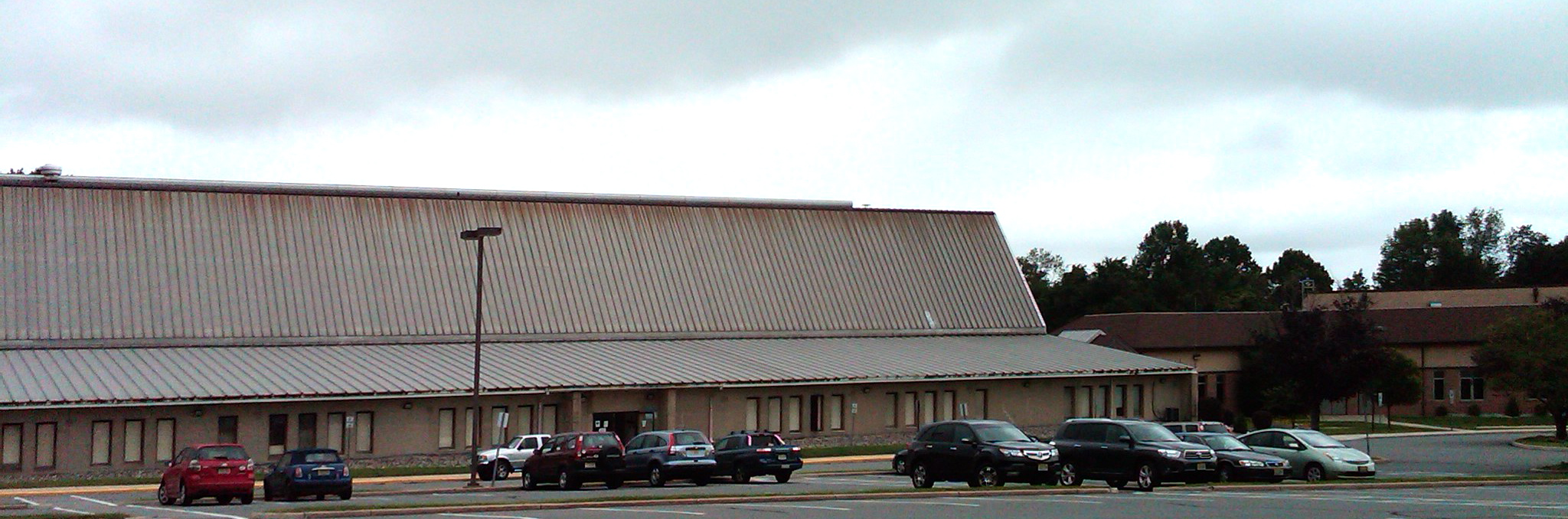
Thomas B. Conley Elementary School

Students in public school for pre-kindergarten through eighth grade attend the schools of the Bethlehem Township School District. As of the 2023–24 school year, the district, comprised of two schools, had an enrollment of 364 students and 36.5 classroom teachers (on an FTE basis), for a student–teacher ratio of 10.0:1. Schools in the district (with 2032–24 enrollment data from the National Center for Education Statistics) are Thomas B. Conley Elementary School with 228 students in grades PreK–5 and Ethel Hoppock Middle School with 134 students in grades 6–8.

Public school students in ninth through twelfth grades attend North Hunterdon High School in Annandale, which also serves students from Clinton Town, Clinton Township, Franklin Township, Lebanon Borough and Union Township. As of the 2023–24 school year, the high school had an enrollment of 1,262 students and 115.5 classroom teachers (on an FTE basis), for a student–teacher ratio of 10.9:1. The school is part of the North Hunterdon-Voorhees Regional High School District, which also includes students from Califon, Glen Gardner, Hampton, High Bridge, Lebanon Township and Tewksbury Township, who attend Voorhees High School in Lebanon Township.

Eighth grade students from all of Hunterdon County are eligible to apply to attend the high school programs offered by the Hunterdon County Vocational School District, a county-wide vocational school district that offers career and technical education at its campuses in Raritan Township and at programs sited at local high schools, with no tuition charged to students for attendance.

== Transportation ==
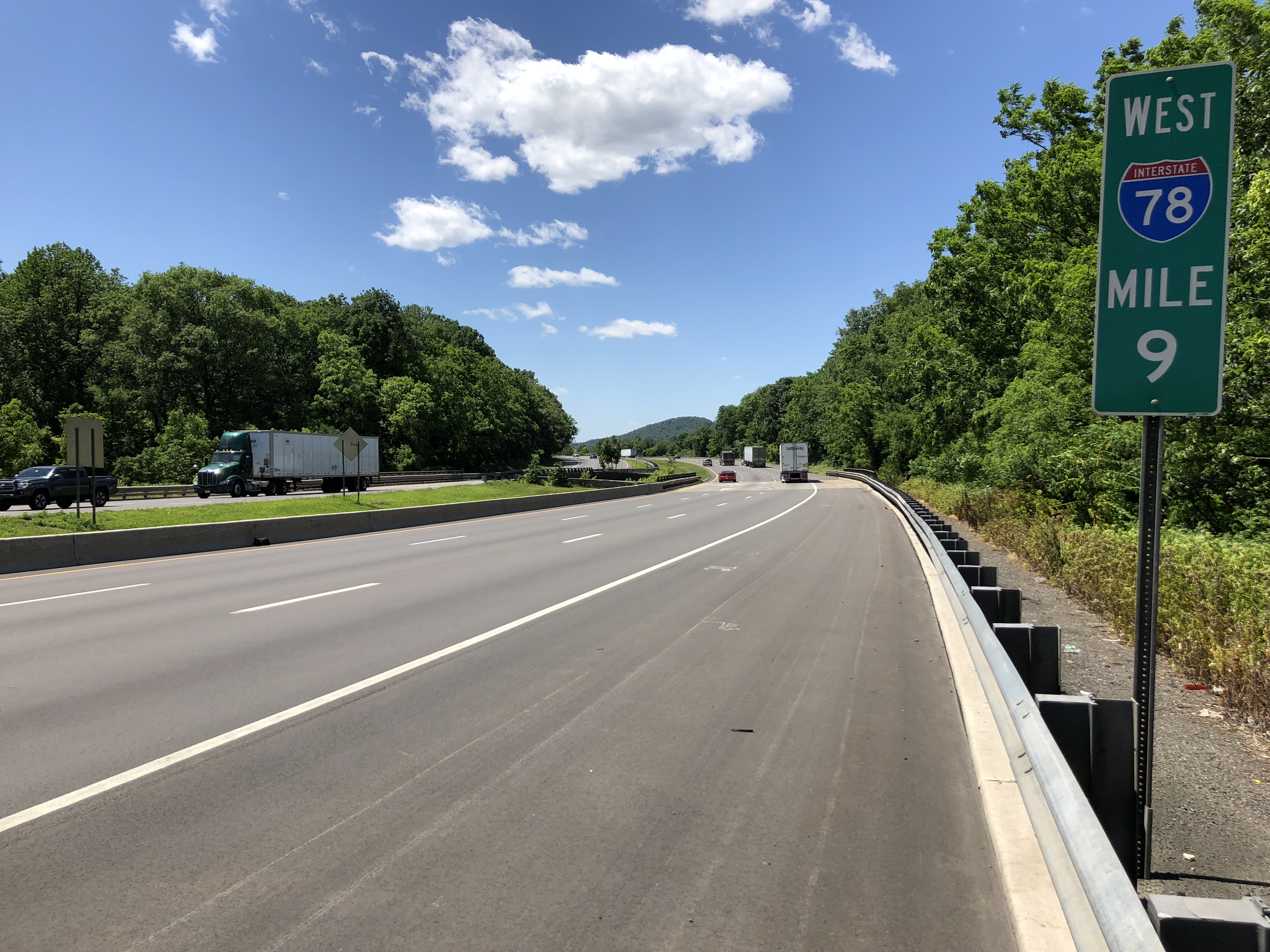
View west along Interstate 78 / U.S. Route 22 in Bethlehem Township

=== Roads and highways ===
As of May 2010, the township had a total of 57.76 miles (92.96 km) of roadways, of which 42.26 miles (68.01 km) were maintained by the municipality, 7.86 miles (12.65 km) by Hunterdon County and 7.64 miles (12.30 km) by the New Jersey Department of Transportation.

Bethlehem Township is well-connected to major metropolitan areas and cities (such as the Lehigh Valley in Pennsylvania and New York City) via Interstate 78 / U.S. Route 22 and Route 173. While I-78/US 22 pass through without any interchanges, the nearest exit is just outside the township in bordering Bloomsbury (Exit 7) and Union Township (Exit 11).

Anderson Road, located within Bethlehem Township, begins in neighboring Union Township and ends in Bethlehem Township as a dead-end, or cul-de-sac. Consequently, Anderson Road cannot be accessed internally through Bethlehem Township; it can only be accessed through Union Township.

=== Public transportation ===
Public transportation is limited to The LINK, a public bus service which serves Hunterdon County. Fares range from about $2.00 to $10.00. Funding for operation of the Hunterdon County LINK System is provided by Hunterdon County, NJ Transit and the Federal Transit Administration.

=== Rail / Lehigh Line ===
The Norfolk Southern Railway's Lehigh Line (formerly the mainline of the Lehigh Valley Railroad), runs through Bethlehem Township on its way to Phillipsburg, New Jersey.

== Notable people ==
People who were born in, residents of, or otherwise closely associated with Bethlehem Township include:

- John T. Bird (1829–1911), member of the United States House of Representatives from 1869 to 1873
- Johnston Cornish (1858–1920), represented New Jersey's 4th congressional district in the United States House of Representatives from 1893 to 1895
- Anne Marie Letko (born 1969), long-distance runner who competed in the Summer Olympics in 1996 and 2000
- Daniel Morgan (1736–1802), Revolutionary War general and a United States Representative from the State of Virginia
- James Parker (1776–1868), member of the House of Representatives from New Jersey
- Bennet Van Syckel (1830–1921), Associate Justice of the New Jersey Supreme Court from 1869 to 1904
