= Glen Gardner, New Jersey =

Borough in Hunterdon County, New Jersey, US

- Borough
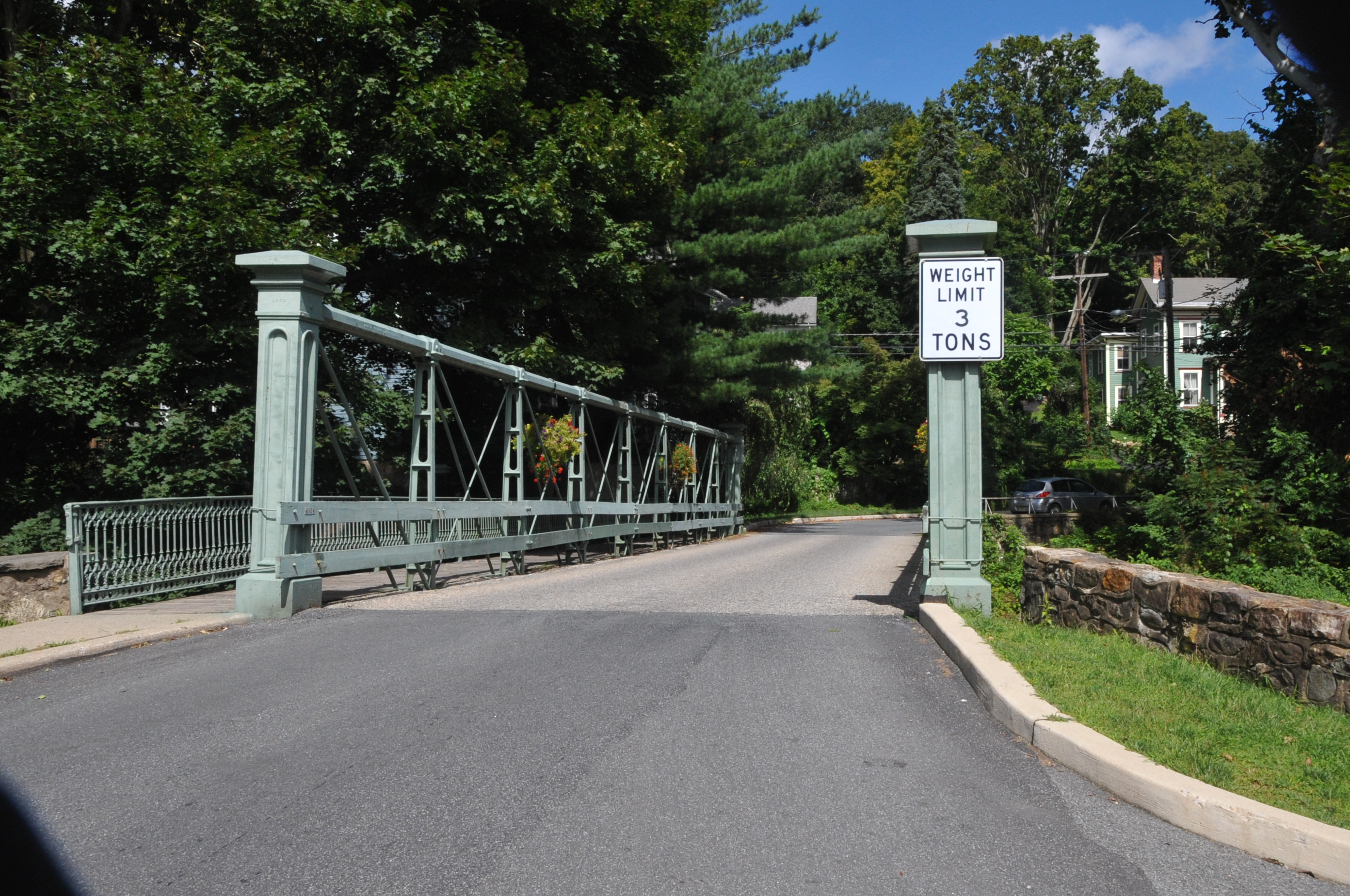
- Glen Gardner Pony Pratt Truss Bridge

- Seal

- Location of Glen Gardner in Hunterdon County highlighted in red (left). Inset map: Location of Hunterdon County in New Jersey highlighted in orange (right).

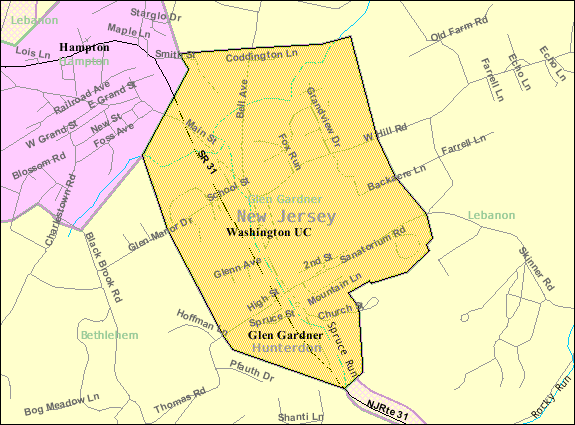
- Census Bureau map of Glen Gardner, New Jersey

- Location in Hunterdon County Location in New Jersey Location in the United States
- Coordinates: 40.700385°N 74.939521°W
- Country: United States
- State: New Jersey
- County: Hunterdon
- Incorporated: March 26, 1919
- Named for: Gardner brothers

Government
  - Type: Borough
  - Body: Borough Council
  - Mayor: Mattias E. Schroeter (R, term ends December 31, 2023)
  - Municipal clerk: Judy Bass

Area
  - Total: 1.55 sq mi (4.01 km^{2})
  - Land: 1.55 sq mi (4.01 km^{2})
  - Water: 0 sq mi (0.00 km^{2}) 0.00%
  - Rank: 448th of 565 in state 16th of 26 in county
- Elevation: 541 ft (165 m)

Population (2020)
  - Total: 1,682
  - Estimate (2023): 1,682
  - Rank: 502nd of 565 in state 19th of 26 in county
  - Density: 1,086.6/sq mi (419.5/km^{2})
  - Rank: 372nd of 565 in state 7th of 26 in county
- Time zone: UTC−05:00 (Eastern (EST))
  - Summer (DST): UTC−04:00 (Eastern (EDT))
- ZIP Code: 08826
- Area code: 908 exchange: 537, 638, 932
- FIPS code: 3401926550
- GNIS feature ID: 0885232
- Website: www.glengardner.org

Glen Gardner is a borough in Hunterdon County, in the U.S. state of New Jersey. As of the 2020 United States census, the borough's population was 1,682, a decrease of 22 (−1.3%) from the 2010 census count of 1,704, which in turn reflected a decline of 198 (−10.4%) from the 1,902 counted in the 2000 census.

Glen Gardner is located at the extreme western border of Lebanon Township and was incorporated as a borough by an act of the New Jersey Legislature on March 26, 1919, from portions of both Lebanon Township and Bethlehem Township based on the results of a referendum held that same day. Portions of the borough were ceded to Hampton borough in 1931.

== History ==
Originally settled by the Lenape Native Americans, European settlement began around the time of the American Revolutionary War.

The area that is now Glen Gardner had been known as Eveland's Tavern for tavernkeeper John Eveland. Later, the area was variously called Spruce Run Mills and Sodom. The name of both the community and post office were officially changed to Glen Gardner in 1871 to mark the glen of the Spruce Run and in honor of the Gardner brothers who owned a chair and frame factory in the area.

As part of the 1931 settlement reached between the two municipalities to resolve a border dispute dating back to the borough of Glen Gardner's formation in 1919, Hampton paid Glen Gardner $4,000 (equivalent to $85,000 in 2025) for 20 acres (8.1 ha) of land that officially became part of the borough of Hampton.

== Geography ==
According to the United States Census Bureau, the borough had a total area of 1.55 square miles (4.01 km^{2}), all of which was land.

Bells Crossing and Clarksville are unincorporated communities located within Glen Gardner.

The borough borders the Hunterdon County municipalities of Bethlehem Township, Hampton Borough and Lebanon Township.

== Demographics ==
Historical population
Census	Pop.	Note	%±
1920	818		—
1930	554		−32.3%
1940	536		−3.2%
1950	654		22.0%
1960	787		20.3%
1970	874		11.1%
1980	834		−4.6%
1990	1,665		99.6%
2000	1,902		14.2%
2010	1,704		−10.4%
2020	1,682		−1.3%
2023 (est.)	1,682	Steady	0.0%
Population sources: 1920; 1920–1930 1940–2000; 2000 2010 2020

=== 2010 census ===
The 2010 United States census counted 1,704 people, 768 households, and 434 families in the borough. The population density was 1,117.8 per square mile (431.6/km^{2}). There were 825 housing units at an average density of 541.2 per square mile (209.0/km^{2}). The racial makeup was 94.54% (1,611) White, 1.76% (30) Black or African American, 0.06% (1) Native American, 1.82% (31) Asian, 0.00% (0) Pacific Islander, 0.35% (6) from other races, and 1.47% (25) from two or more races. Hispanic or Latino of any race were 5.28% (90) of the population.

Of the 768 households, 28.4% had children under the age of 18; 45.1% were married couples living together; 8.5% had a female householder with no husband present and 43.5% were non-families. Of all households, 35.3% were made up of individuals and 7.6% had someone living alone who was 65 years of age or older. The average household size was 2.22 and the average family size was 2.97.

21.3% of the population were under the age of 18, 6.6% from 18 to 24, 28.5% from 25 to 44, 34.8% from 45 to 64, and 8.8% who were 65 years of age or older. The median age was 41.6 years. For every 100 females, the population had 97.7 males. For every 100 females ages 18 and older there were 91.6 males.

The Census Bureau's 2006–2010 American Community Survey showed that (in 2010 inflation-adjusted dollars) median household income was $73,750 (with a margin of error of +/− $15,026) and the median family income was $98,693 (+/− $9,105). Males had a median income of $62,434 (+/− $12,072) versus $49,417 (+/− $13,970) for females. The per capita income for the borough was $37,184 (+/− $4,006). About 1.2% of families and 2.3% of the population were below the poverty line, including 1.4% of those under age 18 and 7.6% of those age 65 or over.

=== 2000 census ===
At the 2000 United States census, there were 1,902 people, 805 households and 474 families residing in the borough. The population density was 1,217.6 inhabitants per square mile (470.1/km^{2}). There were 829 housing units at an average density of 530.7 per square mile (204.9/km^{2}). The racial makeup of the borough was 95.69% White, 0.89% African American, 0.11% Native American, 1.47% Asian, 0.11% Pacific Islander, 0.58% from other races, and 1.16% from two or more races. Hispanic or Latino of any race were 3.42% of the population.

There were 805 households, of which 32.9% had children under the age of 18 living with them, 46.6% were married couples living together, 9.7% had a female householder with no husband present, and 41.1% were non-families. 34.2% of all households were made up of individuals, and 8.6% had someone living alone who was 65 years of age or older. The average household size was 2.33 and the average family size was 3.07.

Age distribution was 25.3% under the age of 18, 6.0% from 18 to 24, 41.2% from 25 to 44, 19.8% from 45 to 64, and 7.6% who were 65 years of age or older. The median age was 35 years. For every 100 females, there were 95.5 males. For every 100 females age 18 and over, there were 89.7 males.

The median household income was $59,917, and the median family income was $75,369. Males had a median income of $50,776 versus $40,179 for females. The per capita income for the borough was $28,647. About 4.2% of families and 4.5% of the population were below the poverty line, including 4.8% of those under age 18 and 1.4% of those age 65 or over.

== Government ==
=== Local government ===
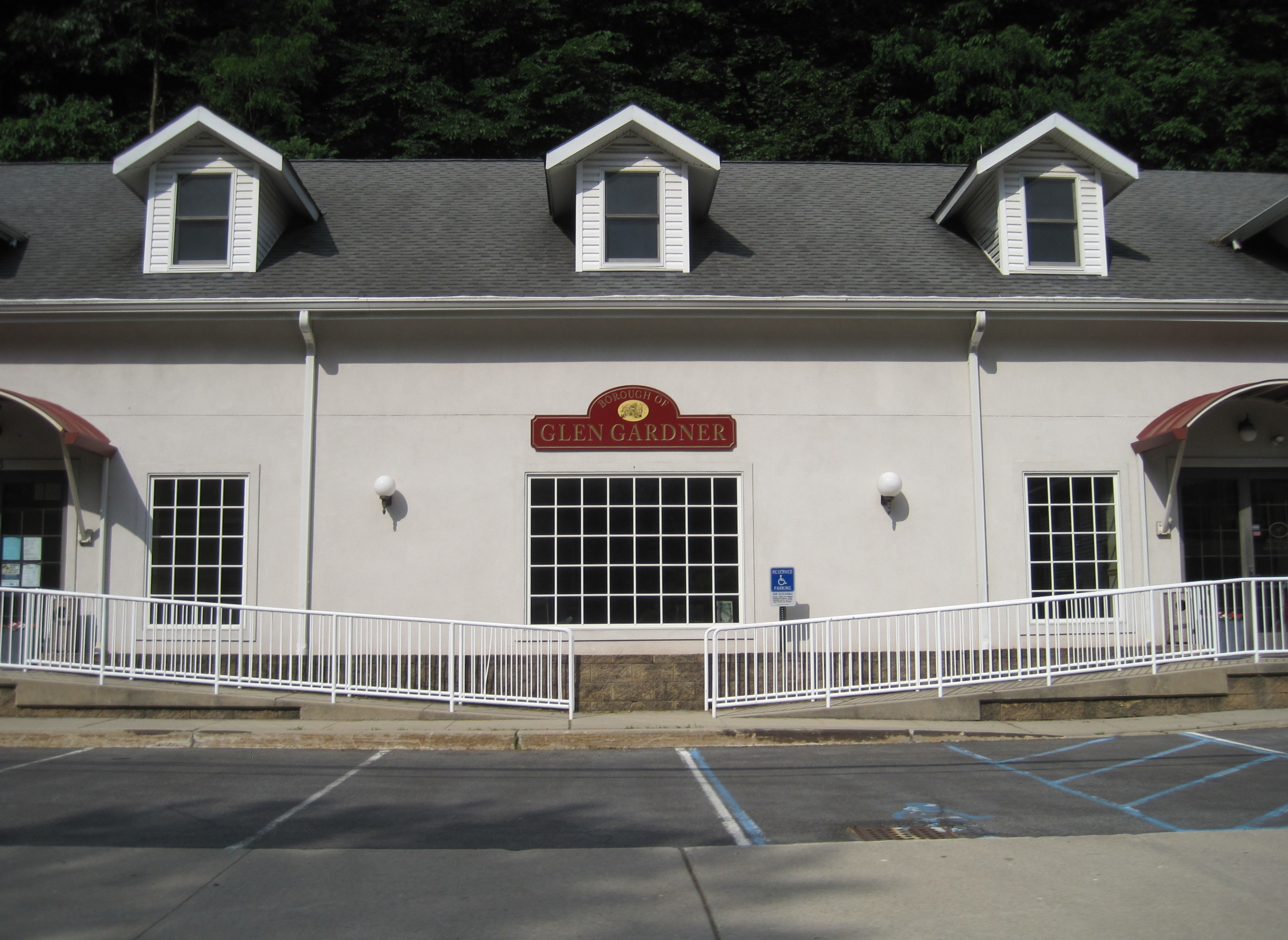
Glen Gardner borough hall

Glen Gardner is governed under the borough form of New Jersey municipal government, one of 218 municipalities (of the 564) statewide that use this form, which is the state's most common form of government. The governing body is comprised of the mayor and the borough council, with all positions elected at-large on a partisan basis as part of the November general election. The mayor is elected directly by the voters to a four-year term of office. The borough council has six members elected to serve three-year terms on a staggered basis, with two seats coming up for election each year in a three-year cycle. The borough form of government used by Glen Gardner is a "weak mayor / strong council" government in which council members act as the legislative body with the mayor presiding at meetings and voting only in the event of a tie. The mayor can veto ordinances subject to an override by a two-thirds majority vote of the council. The mayor makes committee and liaison assignments for council members, and most appointments are made by the mayor with the advice and consent of the council. This seven-member governing body enacts local ordinances, levies municipal taxes and conducts the affairs of the borough. The mayor and borough council conducts all of its business during monthly meetings open to the public.

As of 2023, the mayor of Glen Gardner is Republican Mattias E. Schroeter, whose term of office ends December 31, 2023. Members of the Borough Council are Council President Michael Gronau (R, 2023), James Ayotte (R, 2025), Jason Hollenstein (R, 2025), Richard J. Mitterando (R, 2024), Don Robertella (R, 2023) and Sue Welch (R, 2024).

In April 2021, the borough council appointed Jason Hollenstein to fill the council seat expiring in December 2022 that had been held by Lisa Fielding until she resigned from office the previous month. Hollenstein served on an interim basis until the November 2021 general election, when he was elected to serve the balance of the term of office.

James Ayotte was selected in May 2020 from a list of three names submitted by the Republican municipal committee to fill the seat expiring in December 2022 that had been held by Sandra Sutton-Lavis until she resigned from her seat in April. After serving on an interim basis, Ayotte was elected to serve the remainder of the term at the November 2020 general election.

In 2018, the borough had an average property tax bill of $5,894, the lowest in the county, compared to an average bill of $9,738 in Hunterdon County and $8,767 statewide.

=== Federal, state and county representation ===
Glen Gardner is located in the 7th Congressional District and is part of New Jersey's 23rd state legislative district.

For the 119th United States Congress, New Jersey's 7th congressional district is represented by Thomas Kean Jr. (R, Westfield). New Jersey is represented in the United States Senate by Democrats Cory Booker (Newark, term ends 2027) and Andy Kim (Moorestown, term ends 2031).

For the 2026–2027 session, the 23rd legislative district of the New Jersey Legislature is represented in the State Senate by Doug Steinhardt (R, Lopatcong Township) and in the General Assembly by John DiMaio (R, Hackettstown) and Erik Peterson (R, Franklin Township).

Hunterdon County is governed by a Board of County Commissioners comprised of five members who are elected at-large on a partisan basis to serve three-year terms of office on a staggered basis, with either one or two seats up for election each year as part of the November general election. At an annual reorganization meeting held each January, the commissioners select one member to serve as the board's Director and another to serve as Deputy Director, each for a one-year term. As of 2025, Hunterdon County's Commissioners are Director John E. Lanza (R; Raritan Township, 2025), Deputy Director Shaun C. Van Doren (R; Tewksbury Township, 2026), Jeff Kuhl (R; Raritan Township, 2027), Zachary T. Rich (R; West Amwell Township, 2025) and Susan Soloway (R; Franklin Township, 2027).

Constitutional officers elected on a countywide basis are Clerk Mary H. Melfi (R; Flemington, 2026), Sheriff Fredrick W. Brown (R; Alexandria Township, 2025) and Surrogate Heidi Rohrbach (R; Lebanon Township, 2028).

=== Politics ===
As of March 2011, there were a total of 1,097 registered voters in Glen Gardner, of which 249 (22.7%) were registered as Democrats, 347 (31.6%) were registered as Republicans and 500 (45.6%) were registered as Unaffiliated. There was 1 voter registered to other parties.

Gubernatorial election results for Glen Gardner
Year	Republican		Democratic		Third party(ies)	
Year	No.	%	No.	%	No.	%
2025	380	49.67%	380	49.67%	5	0.65%
2021	377	60.03%	246	39.17%	5	0.80%
2017	307	60.55%	180	35.50%	20	3.94%
2013	386	74.66%	121	23.40%	10	1.93%
2009	410	70.45%	114	19.59%	58	9.97%
2005	296	59.32%	153	30.66%	50	10.02%

In the 2012 presidential election, Republican Mitt Romney received 54.7% of the vote (438 cast), ahead of Democrat Barack Obama with 43.3% (347 votes), and other candidates with 2.0% (16 votes), among the 810 ballots cast by the borough's 1,144 registered voters (9 ballots were spoiled), for a turnout of 70.8%. In the 2008 presidential election, Republican John McCain received 54.0% of the vote (445 cast), ahead of Democrat Barack Obama with 44.1% (363 votes) and other candidates with 1.5% (12 votes), among the 824 ballots cast by the borough's 1,102 registered voters, for a turnout of 74.8%. In the 2004 presidential election, Republican George W. Bush received 57.9% of the vote (453 ballots cast), outpolling Democrat John Kerry with 41.0% (321 votes) and other candidates with 0.8% (8 votes), among the 783 ballots cast by the borough's 1,027 registered voters, for a turnout percentage of 76.2.

United States presidential election results for Glen Gardner
Year	Republican		Democratic		Third party(ies)	
Year	No.	%	No.	%	No.	%
2024	526	53.51%	445	45.27%	12	1.22%
2020	520	51.38%	479	47.33%	13	1.28%
2016	467	54.68%	335	39.23%	52	6.09%
2012	438	54.68%	347	43.32%	16	2.00%
2008	445	54.27%	363	44.27%	12	1.46%
2004	543	62.27%	321	36.81%	8	0.92%

In the 2013 gubernatorial election, Republican Chris Christie received 74.7% of the vote (386 cast), ahead of Democrat Barbara Buono with 23.4% (121 votes), and other candidates with 1.9% (10 votes), among the 525 ballots cast by the borough's 1,118 registered voters (8 ballots were spoiled), for a turnout of 47.0%. In the 2009 gubernatorial election, Republican Chris Christie received 69.6% of the vote (410 ballots cast), ahead of Democrat Jon Corzine with 19.4% (114 votes), Independent Chris Daggett with 8.8% (52 votes) and other candidates with 1.0% (6 votes), among the 589 ballots cast by the borough's 1,088 registered voters, yielding a 54.1% turnout.

United States Senate election results for Glen Gardner1
Year	Republican		Democratic		Third party(ies)	
Year	No.	%	No.	%	No.	%
2024	496	53.51%	411	44.34%	20	2.16%
2018	423	59.00%	261	36.40%	33	4.60%
2012	408	54.69%	316	42.36%	22	2.95%
2006	254	54.62%	185	39.78%	26	5.59%

United States Senate election results for Glen Gardner2
Year	Republican		Democratic		Third party(ies)	
Year	No.	%	No.	%	No.	%
2020	508	50.90%	454	45.49%	36	3.61%
2014	246	57.34%	167	38.93%	16	3.73%
2013	215	62.68%	125	36.44%	3	0.87%
2008	437	57.96%	272	36.07%	45	5.97%

== Education ==
Clinton-Glen Gardner School District is school district based in the Town of Clinton, that serves students from Clinton Town and Glen Gardner Borough in pre-kindergarten through eighth grade at Clinton Public School. Before Glen Gardner, a non-operating district, was consolidated into the district, students from the borough had attended the district's school as part of a sending/receiving relationship. Other students attend the school on a tuition basis. Formerly known as the Town of Clinton School District, the district's board of education voted in November 2009 to revise the name to Clinton-Glen Gardner School District to reflect the merger. As of the 2021–22 school year, the district, comprised of one school, had an enrollment of 427 students and 38.3 classroom teachers (on an FTE basis), for a student–teacher ratio of 11.1:1.

Public school students in ninth through twelfth grades have two choices: North Hunterdon High School or Voorhees High School, both of the North Hunterdon-Voorhees Regional High School District. Glen Gardner residents began to select which high school they wished to attend in 2014. Pre-2014, Glen Gardner students were zoned to Voorhees High.

Eighth grade students from all of Hunterdon County are eligible to apply to attend the high school programs offered by the Hunterdon County Vocational School District, a county-wide vocational school district that offers career and technical education at its campuses in Raritan Township and at programs sited at local high schools, with no tuition charged to students for attendance.

== Transportation ==
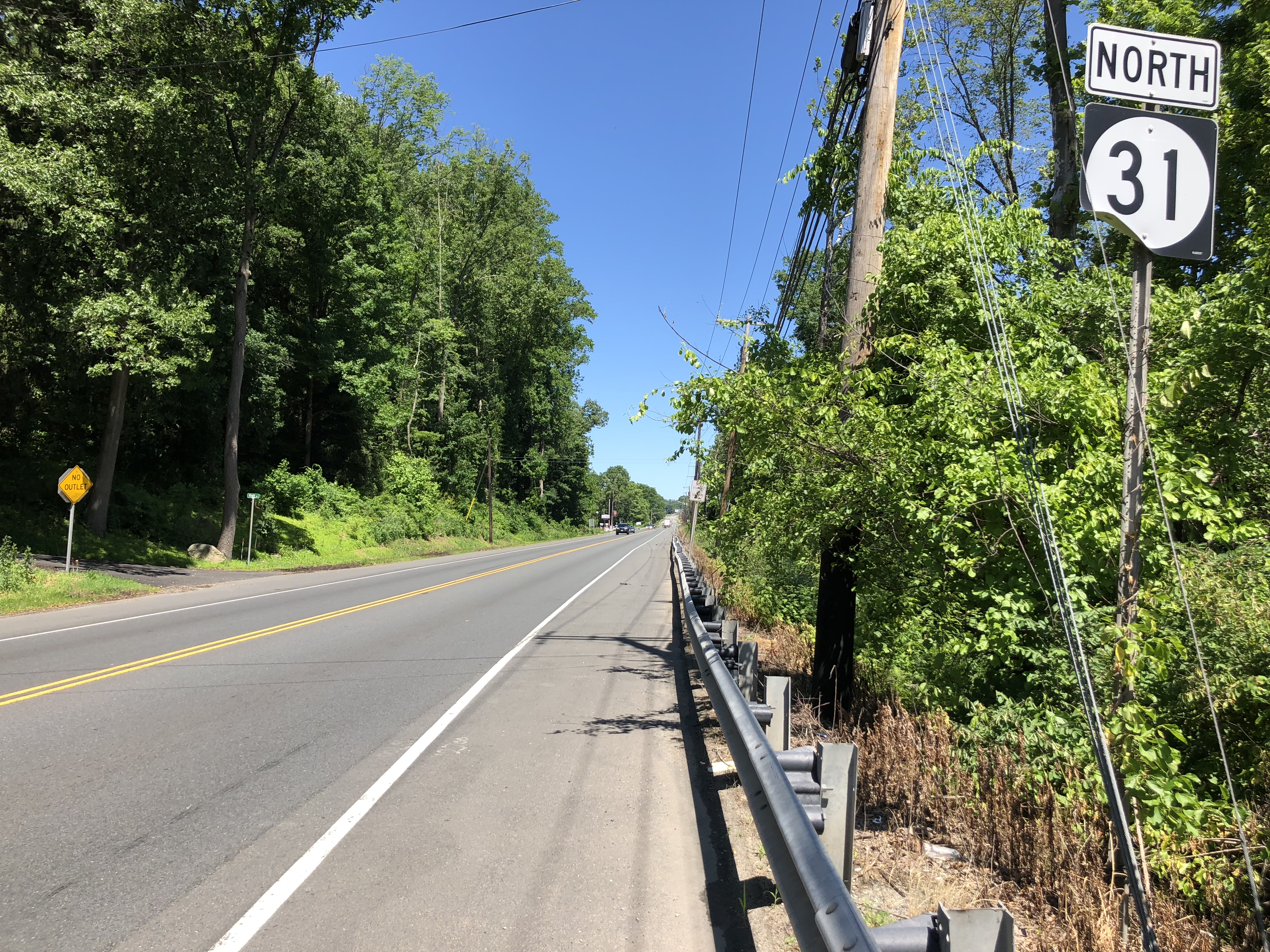
Route 31 in Glen Gardner

As of May 2010, the borough had a total of 10.89 miles (17.53 km) of roadways, of which 7.84 miles (12.62 km) were maintained by the municipality, 1.36 miles (2.19 km) by Hunterdon County and 1.69 miles (2.72 km) by the New Jersey Department of Transportation.

New Jersey Route 31 is the main highway through Glen Gardner.

== Notable people ==
People who were born in, residents of, or otherwise closely associated with Glen Gardner include:

- Whittaker Chambers (1901–1961), writer and editor who testified against Alger Hiss about their work for Soviet intelligence
- Wyllis Cooper (1899–1955), radio writer
- David Dellinger (1915–2004), pacifist, author, and one of the Chicago Seven
- Lee Getz (born 1964), former American football guard who played for the Kansas City Chiefs in the National Football League
- Wesley Lance (1908–2007), member of both the New Jersey General Assembly and the New Jersey Senate
- Anne Marie Letko (born 1969), long-distance runner who competed in the Summer Olympics in 1996 and 2000
