= Hampton, New Jersey =

Borough in Hunterdon County, New Jersey, US

- Borough
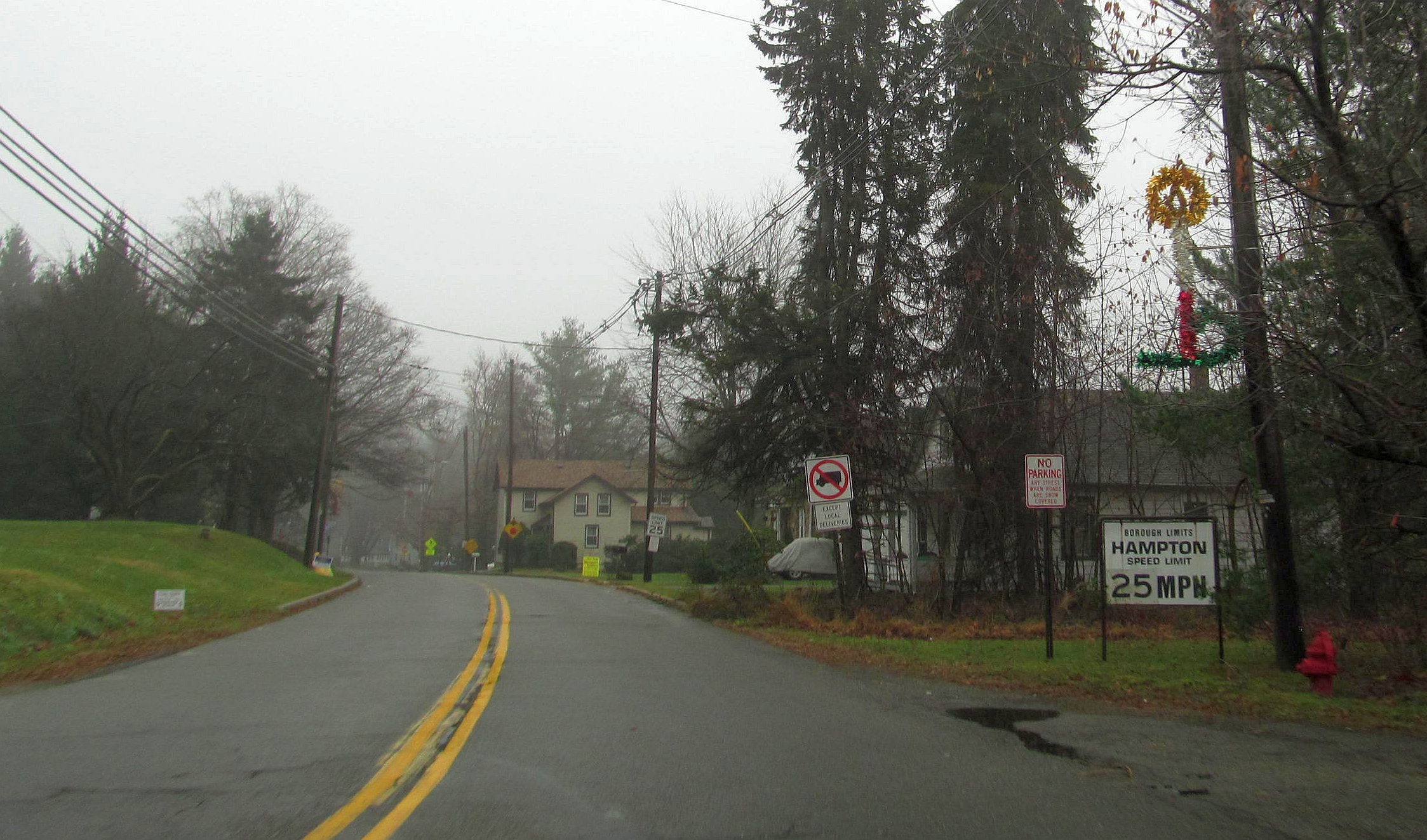
- Entering Hampton along Main Street

- logo

- Location of Hampton in Hunterdon County highlighted in red (left). Inset map: Location of Hunterdon County in New Jersey highlighted in orange (right).

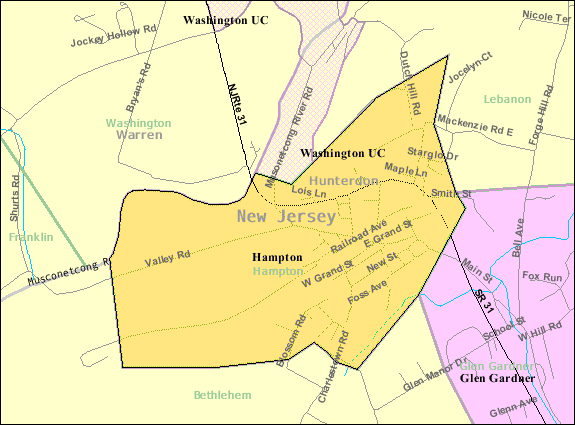
- Census Bureau map of Hampton, New Jersey

- Location in Hunterdon County Location in New Jersey Location in the United States
- Coordinates: 40.70457°N 74.971525°W
- Country: United States
- State: New Jersey
- County: Hunterdon
- Incorporated: February 20, 1895 as Junction Borough
- Renamed: February 11, 1909 as Hampton Borough

Government
  - Type: Borough
  - Body: Borough Council
  - Mayor: Todd Shaner (R, term ends December 31, 2023)
  - Municipal clerk: Linda Leidner

Area
  - Total: 1.52 sq mi (3.93 km^{2})
  - Land: 1.51 sq mi (3.90 km^{2})
  - Water: 0.012 sq mi (0.03 km^{2}) 0.79%
  - Rank: 450th of 565 in state 17th of 26 in county
- Elevation: 417 ft (127 m)

Population (2020)
  - Total: 1,438
  - Estimate (2023): 1,443
  - Rank: 514th of 565 in state 21st of 26 in county
  - Density: 955.5/sq mi (368.9/km^{2})
  - Rank: 389th of 565 in state 10th of 26 in county
- Time zone: UTC−05:00 (Eastern (EST))
  - Summer (DST): UTC−04:00 (Eastern (EDT))
- ZIP Code: 08827
- Area code: 908
- FIPS code: 3401929460
- GNIS feature ID: 0885243
- Website: www.hamptonboro.org

Hampton is a borough in Hunterdon County, in the U.S. state of New Jersey. As of the 2020 United States census, the borough's population was 1,438, an increase of 37 (+2.6%) from the 2010 census count of 1,401, which in turn reflected a decline of 145 (−9.4%) from the 1,546 counted in the 2000 census.

== History ==
What is now Hampton was originally incorporated by an act of the New Jersey Legislature as Junction Borough on February 20, 1895, from portions of both Lebanon Township and Bethlehem Township, based on the results of a referendum held on the previous day. By a resolution of the borough council, the name was changed to Hampton as of February 11, 1909. In 1931, additional territory was annexed from both Glen Gardner and Bethlehem Township. As part of the 1931 settlement reached between the two municipalities to resolve a border dispute dating back to the borough of Glen Gardner's formation in 1919, Hampton paid Glen Gardner $4,000 (equivalent to $85,000 in 2025) for 20 acres (8.1 ha) of land that became part of the borough.

Located on the banks of the Musconetcong River, Hampton was first settled in 1800. In 1880, the town consisted of a store, hotel, cabinet manufacturer, blacksmith, wheelwright shop, grist mill, school house and about 25 dwellings. Hampton was once known as "Junction" because the Central Railroad of New Jersey and the Delaware, Lackawanna and Western Railroad crossed through here.

The cremated remains of occultist Aleister Crowley were buried under a tree by O.T.O. successor Karl Germer at his home in Hampton.

== Geography ==
According to the United States Census Bureau, the borough had a total area of 1.52 square miles (3.93 km^{2}), including 1.51 square miles (3.90 km^{2}) of land and 0.01 square miles (0.03 km^{2}) of water (0.79%).

Hampton Junction is an unincorporated community within Hampton.

The borough borders the municipalities of Bethlehem Township, Glen Gardner Borough and Lebanon Township in Hunterdon County; and Washington Township in Warren County.

== Demographics ==
Historical population
Census	Pop.	Note	%±
1900	998		—
1910	914		−8.4%
1920	916		0.2%
1930	861		−6.0%
1940	864		0.3%
1950	975		12.8%
1960	1,135		16.4%
1970	1,386		22.1%
1980	1,614		16.5%
1990	1,515		−6.1%
2000	1,546		2.0%
2010	1,401		−9.4%
2020	1,438		2.6%
2023 (est.)	1,443	▲	0.3%
Population sources: 1900–1920 1900–1910; 1910–1930 1940–2000; 2000 2010 2020

=== 2010 census ===
The 2010 United States census counted 1,401 people, 570 households, and 368 families in the borough. The population density was 915.1 per square mile (353.3/km^{2}). There were 612 housing units at an average density of 399.7 per square mile (154.3/km^{2}). The racial makeup was 92.29% (1,293) White, 2.50% (35) Black or African American, 0.71% (10) Native American, 1.86% (26) Asian, 0.07% (1) Pacific Islander, 1.00% (14) from other races, and 1.57% (22) from two or more races. Hispanic or Latino of any race were 5.35% (75) of the population.

Of the 570 households, 29.3% had children under the age of 18; 50.4% were married couples living together; 9.5% had a female householder with no husband present and 35.4% were non-families. Of all households, 30.2% were made up of individuals and 14.4% had someone living alone who was 65 years of age or older. The average household size was 2.46 and the average family size was 3.11.

21.6% of the population were under the age of 18, 8.1% from 18 to 24, 25.8% from 25 to 44, 31.1% from 45 to 64, and 13.4% who were 65 years of age or older. The median age was 41.6 years. For every 100 females, the population had 101.0 males. For every 100 females ages 18 and older there were 97.0 males.

The Census Bureau's 2006–2010 American Community Survey showed that (in 2010 inflation-adjusted dollars) median household income was $63,681 (with a margin of error of +/− $9,751) and the median family income was $82,396 (+/− $19,162). Males had a median income of $54,500 (+/− $9,914) versus $33,594 (+/− $8,886) for females. The per capita income for the borough was $30,468 (+/− $3,353). About 10.2% of families and 10.0% of the population were below the poverty line, including 17.3% of those under age 18 and 10.1% of those age 65 or over.

=== 2000 census ===
As of the 2000 United States census there were 1,546 people, 559 households, and 377 families residing in the borough. The population density was 1,006.8 inhabitants per square mile (388.7/km^{2}). There were 574 housing units at an average density of 373.8 per square mile (144.3/km^{2}). The racial makeup of the borough was 91.01% White, 4.98% African American, 0.39% Native American, 0.97% Asian, 0.78% from other races, and 1.88% from two or more races. Hispanic or Latino of any race were 2.85% of the population.

There were 559 households, out of which 36.5% had children under the age of 18 living with them, 53.3% were married couples living together, 10.7% had a female householder with no husband present, and 32.4% were non-families. 27.7% of all households were made up of individuals, and 13.1% had someone living alone who was 65 years of age or older. The average household size was 2.58 and the average family size was 3.20.

In the borough the population was spread out, with 25.7% under the age of 18, 10.9% from 18 to 24, 30.3% from 25 to 44, 22.1% from 45 to 64, and 11.0% who were 65 years of age or older. The median age was 35 years. For every 100 females there were 106.7 males. For every 100 females age 18 and over, there were 108.0 males.

The median income for a household in the borough was $51,111, and the median income for a family was $64,583. Males had a median income of $45,096 versus $32,000 for females. The per capita income for the borough was $22,440. About 7.1% of families and 8.3% of the population were below the poverty line, including 11.1% of those under age 18 and 3.5% of those age 65 or over.

== Government ==
=== Local government ===
Hampton is governed under the borough form of New Jersey municipal government, which is used in 218 municipalities (of the 564) statewide, making it the most common form of government in New Jersey. The governing body is comprised of the mayor and the borough council, with all positions elected at-large on a partisan basis as part of the November general election. A mayor is elected directly by the voters to a four-year term of office. The borough council includes six members elected to serve three-year terms on a staggered basis, with two seats coming up for election each year in a three-year cycle. The borough form of government used by Hampton is a "weak mayor / strong council" government in which council members act as the legislative body with the mayor presiding at meetings and voting only in the event of a tie. The mayor can veto ordinances subject to an override by a two-thirds majority vote of the council. The mayor makes committee and liaison assignments for council members, and most appointments are made by the mayor with the advice and consent of the council.

As of 2023, the mayor of Hampton Borough is Republican Todd Shaner, whose term of office ends December 31, 2023. Members of the Hampton Borough Council are Council President Robert T. Wotanowski (R, 2023), Robert M. Celentano (R, 2023), John R. Drummond (R, 2025), Douglas E. Rega (R, 2024), Carroll L. Swenson (R, 2025) and Jeffrey A. Tampier (R, 2024).

In May 2013, the borough council selected James Cregar from a list of three candidates recommended by the Republican municipal committee to fill the vacant seat of Mayor Peter Winter following his resignation in May, at which time Cregar had become acting mayor.

=== Federal, state and county representation ===
Hampton is located in the 7th Congressional District and is part of New Jersey's 23rd state legislative district.

For the 119th United States Congress, New Jersey's 7th congressional district is represented by Thomas Kean Jr. (R, Westfield). New Jersey is represented in the United States Senate by Democrats Cory Booker (Newark, term ends 2027) and Andy Kim (Moorestown, term ends 2031).

For the 2026–2027 session, the 23rd legislative district of the New Jersey Legislature is represented in the State Senate by Doug Steinhardt (R, Lopatcong Township) and in the General Assembly by John DiMaio (R, Hackettstown) and Erik Peterson (R, Franklin Township).

Hunterdon County is governed by a Board of County Commissioners comprised of five members who are elected at-large on a partisan basis to serve three-year terms of office on a staggered basis, with either one or two seats up for election each year as part of the November general election. At an annual reorganization meeting held each January, the commissioners select one member to serve as the board's Director and another to serve as Deputy Director, each for a one-year term. As of 2025, Hunterdon County's Commissioners are Director John E. Lanza (R; Raritan Township, 2025), Deputy Director Shaun C. Van Doren (R; Tewksbury Township, 2026), Jeff Kuhl (R; Raritan Township, 2027), Zachary T. Rich (R; West Amwell Township, 2025) and Susan Soloway (R; Franklin Township, 2027).

Constitutional officers elected on a countywide basis are Clerk Mary H. Melfi (R; Flemington, 2026), Sheriff Fredrick W. Brown (R; Alexandria Township, 2025) and Surrogate Heidi Rohrbach (R; Lebanon Township, 2028).

=== Politics ===
As of March 2011, there were a total of 884 registered voters in Hampton, of which 182 (20.6%) were registered as Democrats, 270 (30.5%) were registered as Republicans and 432 (48.9%) were registered as Unaffiliated. There were no voters registered to other parties.

Gubernatorial election results for Hampton
Year	Republican		Democratic		Third party(ies)	
Year	No.	%	No.	%	No.	%
2025	337	55.43%	261	42.93%	10	1.64%
2021	340	67.46%	156	30.95%	8	1.59%
2017	254	62.41%	145	35.63%	8	1.97%
2013	272	56.90%	195	40.79%	11	2.30%
2009	310	67.10%	111	24.03%	41	8.87%
2005	267	58.81%	149	32.82%	38	8.37%

In the 2012 presidential election, Republican Mitt Romney received 54.1% of the vote (326 cast), ahead of Democrat Barack Obama with 43.4% (262 votes), and other candidates with 2.5% (15 votes), among the 612 ballots cast by the borough's 915 registered voters (9 ballots were spoiled), for a turnout of 66.9%. In the 2008 presidential election, Republican John McCain received 53.4% of the vote (355 cast), ahead of Democrat Barack Obama with 43.9% (292 votes) and other candidates with 2.1% (14 votes), among the 665 ballots cast by the borough's 894 registered voters, for a turnout of 74.4%. In the 2004 presidential election, Republican George W. Bush received 58.6% of the vote (379 ballots cast), outpolling Democrat John Kerry with 39.6% (256 votes) and other candidates with 0.8% (7 votes), among the 647 ballots cast by the borough's 861 registered voters, for a turnout percentage of 75.1.

United States presidential election results for Hampton
Year	Republican		Democratic		Third party(ies)	
Year	No.	%	No.	%	No.	%
2024	466	59.67%	306	39.18%	9	1.15%
2020	472	58.20%	317	39.09%	22	2.71%
2016	380	57.75%	249	37.84%	29	4.41%
2012	326	54.97%	252	42.50%	15	2.53%
2008	355	53.71%	292	44.18%	14	2.12%
2004	379	59.03%	256	39.88%	7	1.09%

In the 2013 gubernatorial election, Republican Chris Christie received 72.0% of the vote (272 cast), ahead of Democrat Barbara Buono with 25.1% (95 votes), and other candidates with 2.9% (11 votes), among the 388 ballots cast by the borough's 918 registered voters (10 ballots were spoiled), for a turnout of 42.3%. In the 2009 gubernatorial election, Republican Chris Christie received 66.8% of the vote (310 ballots cast), ahead of Democrat Jon Corzine with 23.9% (111 votes), Independent Chris Daggett with 8.4% (39 votes) and other candidates with 0.4% (2 votes), among the 464 ballots cast by the borough's 879 registered voters, yielding a 52.8% turnout.

United States Senate election results for Hampton1
Year	Republican		Democratic		Third party(ies)	
Year	No.	%	No.	%	No.	%
2024	413	58.01%	273	38.34%	26	3.65%
2018	338	58.78%	208	36.17%	29	5.04%
2012	286	51.07%	237	42.32%	37	6.61%
2006	276	56.33%	176	35.92%	38	7.76%

United States Senate election results for Hampton2
Year	Republican		Democratic		Third party(ies)	
Year	No.	%	No.	%	No.	%
2020	444	56.85%	306	39.18%	31	3.97%
2014	195	62.50%	109	34.94%	8	2.56%
2013	168	62.92%	96	35.96%	3	1.12%
2008	330	54.55%	240	39.67%	35	5.79%

== Public services ==
=== Emergency services ===
Fire Department

The Hampton Fire Company is an all-volunteer fire department that was originally established in 1899 as the Junction Fire Company after the borough completed a water system with fire hydrants. In 1909, the name changed to the Musconetcong Fire Company and then later to the Hampton Fire Company. The fire company built the current Borough Hall/Fire House for the borough in 1951. The borough occupied the east side of the building and the fire company used the west side. In 1981, the fire company expanded the building by adding a second floor for borough use and the Fire Company took over the entire lower floor.

The fire company currently has as active apparatuses a 1959 International Harvester fire engine, a 2000 Pierce Fire Engine, 2009 Pierce Fire Engine, Engine 13-1 is a 2000 Pierce Dash pumper with an eight-man cab, 2,000 U.S. gallons per minute (0.13 m^{3}/s) pump and a 1,000-US-gallon (3,800 L) tank, a 2013 Ford Expedition Command Vehicle, and a 1978 GMC Rescue Truck. There are more than 40 active members on the rolls which includes an active Junior Firefighter program for young people age 14 and over.

Emergency squad

In 1955, the Hampton Fire Company selected one of its members, Gilbert Riddle, to organize an emergency squad. With the backing of the Fire Company, the present squad became operational in 1956. The Fire Company purchased the first ambulance, which was housed in the firehouse until the squad's permanent facilities were completed. On August 6, 1966 the dedication of the permanent home of the Emergency Squad took place. The Hampton Emergency Squad incorporated itself in 1976, becoming independent of the Fire Company, however its name did not change. In January 1978, the squad established an auxiliary membership. A new GMC rescue truck was purchased in 1978, equipped with four-wheel drive and quartz spotlights for better lighting during accidents and fires. The rescue truck is still in service with the fire company today. The old 1968 Cadillac ambulance was replaced in 1982 by a Braun ambulance, and was later used as a service vehicle. A Ford Horton ambulance was purchased in 1987, and in 1992 another Ford Horton ambulance was added. An additional bay was added to the building in 1979 to provide storage of emergency vehicles and equipment. The Hampton Emergency Squad dedicated their building to the memory of Charles Tampier and William Deemer in 1982. Construction of the second story addition began in September 1985. And then January 1, 2022 the Hampton Emergency Squad merged with South Branch Emergency Services.

== Education ==
The Hampton School District serves students in pre-kindergarten through fifth grade at Hampton Public School. As of the 2022–23 school year, the district, comprised of one school, had an enrollment of 112 students and 14.8 classroom teachers (on an FTE basis), for a student–teacher ratio of 7.6:1. In the 2016–17 school year, Hampton was the 15th-smallest enrollment of any school district in the state, with 128 students.

Starting in the 2018–19 school year, middle school students in grades 6 through 8 are sent to the Lebanon Township Schools on a tuition basis as part of a sending/receiving relationship. As of the 2022–23 school year, Woodglen School had an enrollment of 292 students and 32.4 classroom teachers (on an FTE basis), for a student–teacher ratio of 9.0:1.

Students in public school for ninth through twelfth grades attend Voorhees High School, which also serves the communities of Califon, Glen Gardner (the home of the school), High Bridge, Lebanon Township and Tewksbury Township. As of the 2022–23 school year, the high school had an enrollment of 672 students and 72.3 classroom teachers (on an FTE basis), for a student–teacher ratio of 9.3:1. The school is part of the North Hunterdon-Voorhees Regional High School District, which also serves students from Bethlehem Township, Clinton Town, Clinton Township, Franklin Township, Lebanon Borough and Union Township at North Hunterdon High School in Clinton Township.

Eighth grade students from all of Hunterdon County are eligible to apply to attend the high school programs offered by the Hunterdon County Vocational School District, a county-wide vocational school district that offers career and technical education at its campuses in Raritan Township and at programs sited at local high schools, with no tuition charged to students for attendance.

== Transportation ==
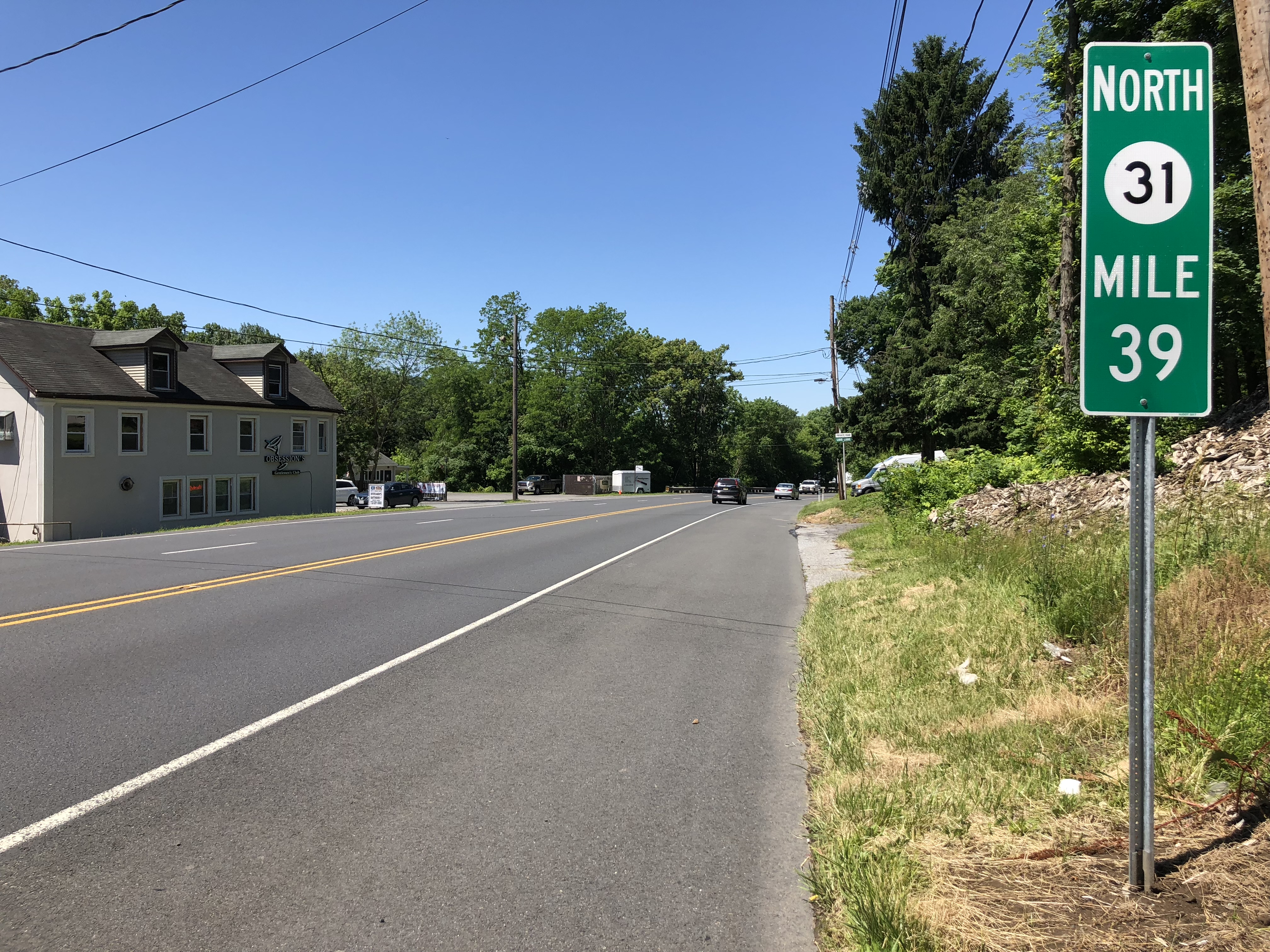
Route 31 in Hampton

As of May 2010, the borough had a total of 8.80 miles (14.16 km) of roadways, of which 6.62 miles (10.65 km) were maintained by the municipality, 1.05 miles (1.69 km) by Hunterdon County and 1.13 miles (1.82 km) by the New Jersey Department of Transportation.

New Jersey Route 31 is the main highway through Hampton.

== Notable people ==
People who were born in, residents of, or otherwise closely associated with Hampton include:

- Daryl Cobb (born 1961), children's book author
- Stephen Dilts, former commissioner of the New Jersey Department of Transportation who served as mayor of Hampton
- Frank L. Howley (1903–1993), United States Army Brigadier General
- Stephen Kovacs (1972–2022), saber fencer and fencing coach, charged with sexual assault, died in prison
- Mary Petty, professional illustrator and author long-associated with The New Yorker
- Sidney Rivera (born 1993), professional soccer player
- Matt Walton (born 1973), stage, screen and television actor who appeared on Onion SportsDome
- Glenway Wescott (1901–1987), novelist
- Bernie Worrell (1944–2016), keyboardist for Parliament-Funkadelic
