= High Bridge, New Jersey =

Borough in Hunterdon County, New Jersey, US

- Borough
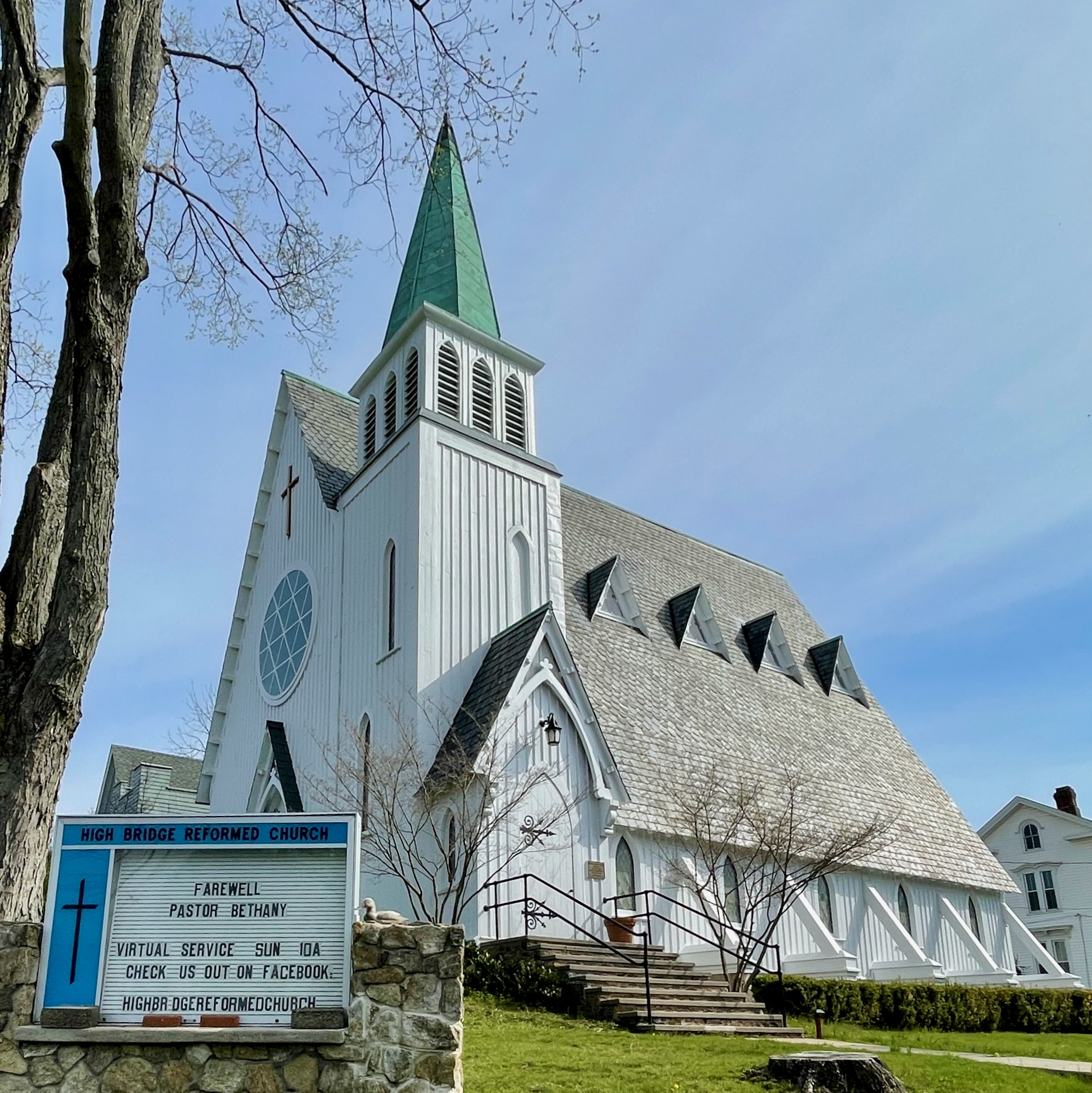
- High Bridge Reformed Church

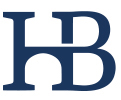
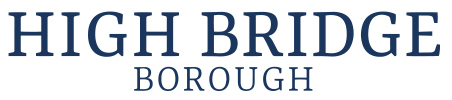
- Logo Wordmark

- Location of High Bridge in Hunterdon County highlighted in red (left). Inset map: Location of Hunterdon County in New Jersey highlighted in orange (right).

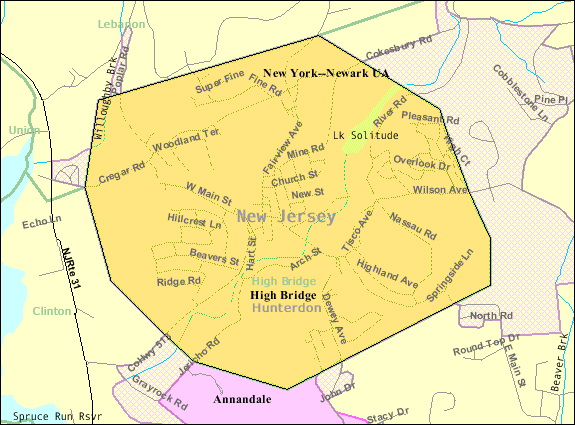
- Census Bureau map of High Bridge, New Jersey

- Location in Hunterdon County Location in New Jersey Location in the United States
- Coordinates: 40.670111°N 74.890212°W
- Country: United States
- State: New Jersey
- County: Hunterdon
- Incorporated: March 29, 1871 (as township)
- Reincorporated: February 19, 1898 (as borough)

Government
  - Type: Borough
  - Body: Borough Council
  - Mayor: Michelle Lee (D, term ends December 31, 2026)
  - Administrator
  - Municipal clerk: Adam Young

Area
  - Total: 2.43 sq mi (6.30 km^{2})
  - Land: 2.39 sq mi (6.19 km^{2})
  - Water: 0.039 sq mi (0.10 km^{2}) 1.65%
  - Rank: 378th of 565 in state 15th of 26 in county
- Elevation: 295 ft (90 m)

Population (2020)
  - Total: 3,546
  - Estimate (2023): 3,592
  - Rank: 428th of 565 in state 15th of 26 in county
  - Density: 1,482.9/sq mi (572.6/km^{2})
  - Rank: 336th of 565 in state 5th of 26 in county
- Time zone: UTC−05:00 (Eastern (EST))
  - Summer (DST): UTC−04:00 (Eastern (EDT))
- ZIP Code: 08829
- Area code: 908 Exchanges: 617, 638
- FIPS code: 3401931320
- GNIS feature ID: 0885251
- Website: www.highbridge.org

High Bridge is a borough in Hunterdon County, in the U.S. state of New Jersey. As of the 2020 United States census, the borough's population was 3,546, a decrease of 102 (−2.8%) from the 2010 census count of 3,648, which in turn reflected a decline of 128 (−3.4%) from the 3,776 counted in the 2000 census.

== History ==
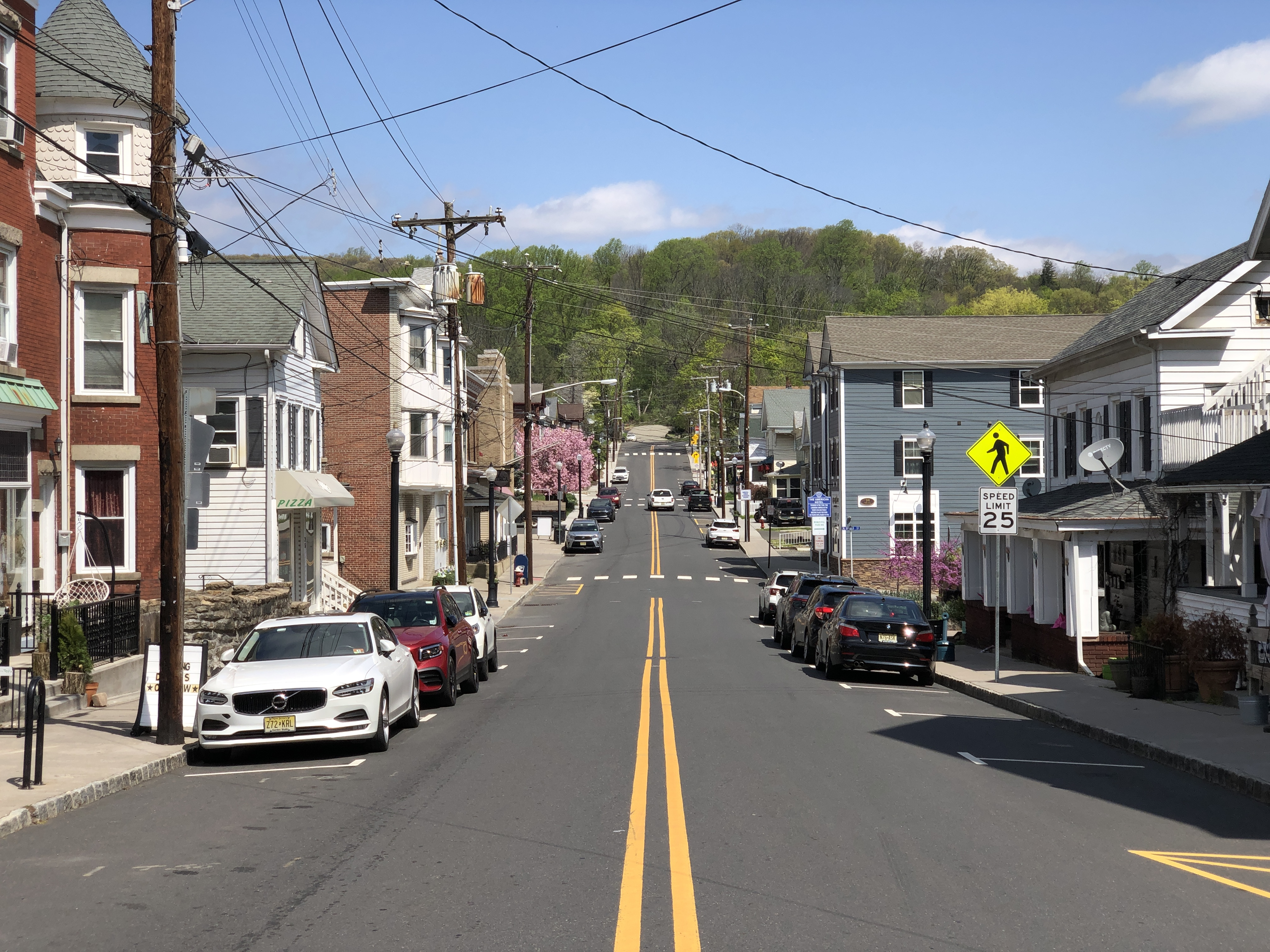
Main Street, 2023

High Bridge was originally incorporated as a township by an act of the New Jersey Legislature on March 29, 1871, from portions of Clinton Township and Lebanon Township. On February 19, 1898, the borough of High Bridge was incorporated from portions of the township, with the remainder returned to Clinton and Lebanon Townships five days later.

The borough is located on the South Branch of the Raritan River in the north central part of Hunterdon County. Water from the South Branch was a valuable power source for one of the first ironworks in the United States, established in the 1740s by William Allen and Joseph Turner of Philadelphia. Allen was the mayor of Philadelphia, a Chief Justice of Pennsylvania, and a prominent landowner in New Jersey. In 1859, the Central Railroad of New Jersey began a five-year construction project of a 112-foot-high (34 m), 1,300-foot-long (400 m) bridge across the river from which structure the locality ultimately took its name.

== Geography ==
According to the United States Census Bureau, the borough had a total area of 2.43 square miles (6.30 km^{2}), including 2.39 square miles (6.19 km^{2}) of land and 0.04 square miles (0.10 km^{2}) of water (1.65%). It is drained by the South Branch of the Raritan River.

High Bridge borders the Hunterdon County municipalities of Clinton Township and Lebanon Township.

Unincorporated communities, localities and place names located partially or completely within the township include Jericho Hill, Pierce Heights and Silverthorn.

=== Climate ===
Climate data for High Bridge, NJ
Month	Jan	Feb	Mar	Apr	May	Jun	Jul	Aug	Sep	Oct	Nov	Dec	Year
Mean daily maximum °F (°C)	37 (3)	41 (5)	50 (10)	62 (17)	72 (22)	81 (27)	85 (29)	83 (28)	77 (25)	65 (18)	54 (12)	42 (6)	62.416 (16.90)
Mean daily minimum °F (°C)	19 (−7)	22 (−6)	28 (−2)	38 (3)	47 (8)	57 (14)	62 (17)	61 (16)	53 (12)	41 (5)	33 (1)	25 (−4)	40.5 (4.7)

== Demographics ==
Historical population
Census	Pop.	Note	%±
1880	2,209		—
1890	1,935		−12.4%
1900	1,377		−28.8%
1910	1,545		12.2%
1920	1,795		16.2%
1930	1,860		3.6%
1940	1,781		−4.2%
1950	1,854		4.1%
1960	2,148		15.9%
1970	2,606		21.3%
1980	3,435		31.8%
1990	3,886		13.1%
2000	3,776		−2.8%
2010	3,648		−3.4%
2020	3,546		−2.8%
2023 (est.)	3,592	▲	1.3%
Population sources: 1880–1920; 1880–1890 1890–1910; 1910–1930 1940–2000; 2000 2010 2020

=== 2020 census ===
As of the 2020 census, High Bridge had a population of 3,546. The median age was 41.5 years. 21.5% of residents were under the age of 18 and 13.9% of residents were 65 years of age or older. For every 100 females there were 97.7 males, and for every 100 females age 18 and over there were 95.3 males age 18 and over.

97.0% of residents lived in urban areas, while 3.0% lived in rural areas.

There were 1,424 households in High Bridge, of which 30.0% had children under the age of 18 living in them. Of all households, 54.8% were married-couple households, 16.8% were households with a male householder and no spouse or partner present, and 21.6% were households with a female householder and no spouse or partner present. About 25.1% of all households were made up of individuals and 8.6% had someone living alone who was 65 years of age or older.

There were 1,517 housing units, of which 6.1% were vacant. The homeowner vacancy rate was 2.5% and the rental vacancy rate was 6.1%.

Racial composition as of the 2020 census
Race	Number	Percent
White	2,998	84.5%
Black or African American	66	1.9%
American Indian and Alaska Native	6	0.2%
Asian	114	3.2%
Native Hawaiian and Other Pacific Islander	0	0.0%
Some other race	101	2.8%
Two or more races	261	7.4%
Hispanic or Latino (of any race)	340	9.6%

=== 2010 census ===
The 2010 United States census counted 3,648 people, 1,418 households, and 1,004 families in the borough. The population density was 1,526.9 per square mile (589.5/km^{2}). There were 1,481 housing units at an average density of 619.9 per square mile (239.3/km^{2}). The racial makeup was 93.17% (3,399) White, 1.32% (48) Black or African American, 0.22% (8) Native American, 3.18% (116) Asian, 0.00% (0) Pacific Islander, 0.74% (27) from other races, and 1.37% (50) from two or more races. Hispanic or Latino of any race were 6.00% (219) of the population.

Of the 1,418 households, 33.6% had children under the age of 18; 58.3% were married couples living together; 9.0% had a female householder with no husband present and 29.2% were non-families. Of all households, 22.9% were made up of individuals and 5.3% had someone living alone who was 65 years of age or older. The average household size was 2.57 and the average family size was 3.06.

24.3% of the population were under the age of 18, 6.9% from 18 to 24, 28.0% from 25 to 44, 32.3% from 45 to 64, and 8.6% who were 65 years of age or older. The median age was 39.9 years. For every 100 females, the population had 101.2 males. For every 100 females ages 18 and older there were 101.4 males.

The Census Bureau's 2006–2010 American Community Survey showed that (in 2010 inflation-adjusted dollars) median household income was $90,037 (with a margin of error of +/− $10,054) and the median family income was $108,148 (+/− $6,913). Males had a median income of $77,500 (+/− $10,021) versus $47,936 (+/− $5,291) for females. The per capita income for the borough was $40,866 (+/− $4,587). About none of families and 0.8% of the population were below the poverty line, including none of those under age 18 and none of those age 65 or over.

=== 2000 census ===
As of the 2000 United States census there were 3,776 people, 1,428 households, and 1,051 families residing in the borough. The population density was 1,566.0 inhabitants per square mile (604.6/km^{2}). There were 1,478 housing units at an average density of 613.0 per square mile (236.7/km^{2}). The racial makeup of the borough was 96.24% White, 0.79% African American, 0.34% Native American, 1.43% Asian, 0.03% Pacific Islander, 0.45% from other races, and 0.72% from two or more races. Hispanic or Latino of any race were 2.12% of the population.

There were 1,428 households, out of which 39.9% had children under the age of 18 living with them, 62.3% were married couples living together, 8.5% had a female householder with no husband present, and 26.4% were non-families. 20.9% of all households were made up of individuals, and 4.8% had someone living alone who was 65 years of age or older. The average household size was 2.64 and the average family size was 3.10.

In the borough the population was spread out, with 27.6% under the age of 18, 5.3% from 18 to 24, 36.4% from 25 to 44, 24.2% from 45 to 64, and 6.5% who were 65 years of age or older. The median age was 36 years. For every 100 females, there were 94.0 males. For every 100 females age 18 and over, there were 92.7 males.

The median income for a household in the borough was $68,719, and the median income for a family was $75,357. Males had a median income of $56,607 versus $35,450 for females. The per capita income for the borough was $29,276. About 1.9% of families and 3.2% of the population were below the poverty line, including 1.9% of those under age 18 and 9.2% of those age 65 or over.

== Economy ==
High Bridge has a downtown (Main Street) that is home to eateries, services and professionals.

The businesses are collectively marketed by the High Bridge Business Association, which assists its member businesses through co-operative advertising, press releases, goodwill and other benefits.

== Parks and recreation ==
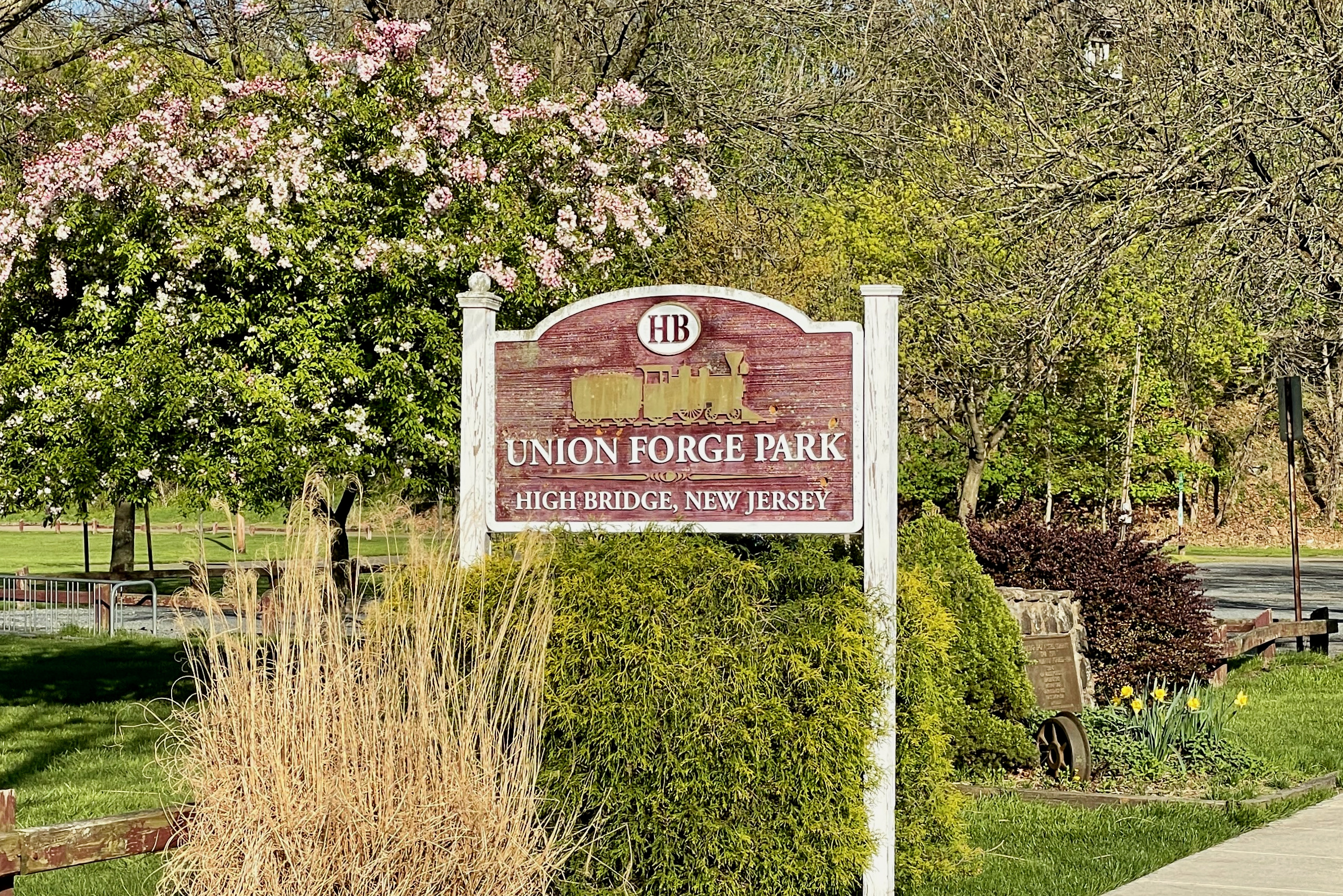
Union Forge Park

High Bridge serves as the southern terminus of a rail trail that was created out of the former Central Railroad of New Jersey High Bridge Branch. The trail is maintained by Hunterdon County Parks and Recreation and is called the Columbia Trail. The trail runs northeastward from the center of the borough (at the junction of Main Street and Church Street) towards Califon, through a scenic area outside the borough limits, known as the Ken Lockwood Gorge.

Union Forge Park is High Bridge's main public park, located by the South Branch Raritan River and the Taylor Wharton complex. Another park is the Borough Commons, situated at the start of the Columbia Trail. A grant received by the Union Forge Heritage Association in 2008 provided for the creation of the Taylor Steelworkers Historical Greenway, which stretches 5 1/4 miles (8.4 km) around the borough, starting at Columbia Trail and connecting the borough's parks and other historic sites.

The High Bridge Hills golf course, located near Route 31, provides another means of recreation in the small town.

== Government ==
=== Local government ===
High Bridge is governed under the borough form of New Jersey municipal government, which is used in 218 municipalities (of the 564) statewide, making it the most common form of government in New Jersey. The governing body is comprised of the mayor and the six-member borough council. The mayor is elected directly by the voters to a four-year term of office. The borough council includes six members elected to serve three-year terms on a staggered basis, with two seats coming up for election each year in a three-year cycle. The borough form of government used by High Bridge is a "weak mayor / strong council" government in which council members act as the legislative body with the mayor presiding at meetings and voting only in the event of a tie. The mayor can veto ordinances subject to an override by a two-thirds majority vote of the council. The borough council decides committee and liaison assignments for council members. Appointments are made by the mayor with the advice and consent of the council.

As of 2023, the mayor of High Bridge Borough is Democrat Michele Lee, whose term of office ends December 31, 2026. Members of the Borough Council are Kenneth Doyle (D, 2025), Natalie Ferry (D, 2023), Christopher Graham (D, 2024; elected to serve an unexpired term), Curtis Nowell (D, 2025), Alan Schwartz (R, 2023) and Steven Silvestri (R, 2024).

High Bridge Borough Council meeting agendas and minutes are available on the borough website.

In February 2022 the borough council selected Christopher Graham from a list of three candidates nominated by the Republican municipal committee to fill the seat expiring in December 2024 that had been held by Leigh Ann Moore until she stepped down from office. Graham won election outright in November 2022 and will now serve the balance of the term of office to December 2024.

In April 2016, the borough council selected Keir LoIacono from a list of three candidates nominated by the Republican municipal committee to fill the seat of Mike Stemple, who had resigned from office the previous month.

In November 2014, the borough council selected Stephen Strange to fill the vacant seat expiring in 2016 of Victoria Miller, who had resigned from office in the previous month. In the November 2015 general election, Strange was elected to serve the balance of the term.

=== Federal, state and county representation ===
High Bridge is located in the 7th Congressional District and is part of New Jersey's 16th state legislative district.

For the 119th United States Congress, New Jersey's 7th congressional district is represented by Thomas Kean Jr. (R, Westfield). New Jersey is represented in the United States Senate by Democrats Cory Booker (Newark, term ends 2027) and Andy Kim (Moorestown, term ends 2031).

For the 2026–2027 session, the 16th legislative district of the New Jersey Legislature is represented in the New Jersey Senate by Andrew Zwicker (D, South Brunswick) and in the General Assembly by Mitchelle Drulis (D, East Amwell Township) and Roy Freiman (D, Hillsborough Township).

Hunterdon County is governed by a Board of County Commissioners comprised of five members who are elected at-large on a partisan basis to serve three-year terms of office on a staggered basis, with either one or two seats up for election each year as part of the November general election. At an annual reorganization meeting held each January, the commissioners select one member to serve as the board's Director and another to serve as Deputy Director, each for a one-year term. As of 2025, Hunterdon County's Commissioners are Director John E. Lanza (R; Raritan Township, 2025), Deputy Director Shaun C. Van Doren (R; Tewksbury Township, 2026), Jeff Kuhl (R; Raritan Township, 2027), Zachary T. Rich (R; West Amwell Township, 2025) and Susan Soloway (R; Franklin Township, 2027).

Constitutional officers elected on a countywide basis are Clerk Mary H. Melfi (R; Flemington, 2026), Sheriff Fredrick W. Brown (R; Alexandria Township, 2025) and Surrogate Heidi Rohrbach (R; Lebanon Township, 2028).

=== Politics ===
As of November 7, 2017, there were a total of 2,587 registered voters in High Bridge.

Gubernatorial election results for High Bridge
Year	Republican		Democratic		Third party(ies)	
Year	No.	%	No.	%	No.	%
2025	759	42.05%	1,030	57.06%	16	0.89%
2021	795	52.13%	707	46.36%	23	1.51%
2017	694	53.10%	577	44.15%	36	2.75%
2013	778	69.34%	320	28.52%	24	2.14%
2009	819	61.12%	367	27.39%	154	11.49%
2005	662	55.96%	436	36.86%	85	7.19%

In the 2012 presidential election, Democrat Barack Obama received 50.4% of the vote (893 cast), ahead of Republican Mitt Romney with 47.8% (846 votes), and other candidates with 1.8% (32 votes), among the 1,788 ballots cast by the borough's 2,497 registered voters (17 ballots were spoiled), for a turnout of 71.6%. In the 2008 presidential election, Democrat Barack Obama received 48.6% of the vote (938 cast), ahead of Republican John McCain with 48.4% (936 votes) and other candidates with 2.1% (41 votes), among the 1,932 ballots cast by the borough's 2,487 registered voters, for a turnout of 77.7%. In the 2004 presidential election, Republican George W. Bush received 55.9% of the vote (1,012 ballots cast), outpolling Democrat John Kerry with 43.0% (778 votes) and other candidates with 1.1% (25 votes), among the 1,811 ballots cast by the borough's 2,315 registered voters, for a turnout percentage of 78.2.

United States presidential election results for High Bridge
Year	Republican		Democratic		Third party(ies)	
Year	No.	%	No.	%	No.	%
2024	966	43.93%	1,176	53.48%	57	2.59%
2020	1,007	44.52%	1,190	52.61%	65	2.87%
2016	908	48.14%	862	45.71%	116	6.15%
2012	846	47.77%	893	50.42%	32	1.81%
2008	936	48.88%	938	48.98%	41	2.14%
2004	1,012	55.76%	778	42.87%	25	1.38%

In the 2013 gubernatorial election, Republican Chris Christie received 69.3% of the vote (778 cast), ahead of Democrat Barbara Buono with 28.5% (320 votes), and other candidates with 2.1% (24 votes), among the 1,136 ballots cast by the borough's 2,469 registered voters (14 ballots were spoiled), for a turnout of 46.0%. In the 2009 gubernatorial election, Republican Chris Christie received 60.6% of the vote (819 ballots cast), ahead of Democrat Jon Corzine with 27.1% (367 votes), Independent Chris Daggett with 10.3% (139 votes) and other candidates with 1.1% (15 votes), among the 1,352 ballots cast by the borough's 2,433 registered voters, yielding a 55.6% turnout.

United States Senate election results for High Bridge1
Year	Republican		Democratic		Third party(ies)	
Year	No.	%	No.	%	No.	%
2024	890	42.56%	1,125	53.80%	76	3.63%
2018	875	50.46%	777	44.81%	82	4.73%
2012	805	48.55%	781	47.10%	72	4.34%
2006	696	55.41%	476	37.90%	84	6.69%

United States Senate election results for High Bridge2
Year	Republican		Democratic		Third party(ies)	
Year	No.	%	No.	%	No.	%
2020	1,034	47.09%	1,080	49.18%	82	3.73%
2014	545	49.23%	522	47.15%	40	3.61%
2013	449	53.45%	376	44.76%	15	1.79%
2008	962	53.92%	711	39.85%	111	6.22%

== Education ==
The High Bridge School District serves students in pre-kindergarten through eighth grade. As of the 2023–24 school year, the district, comprised of two schools, had an enrollment of 351 students and 42.0 classroom teachers (on an FTE basis), for a student–teacher ratio of 8.4:1. Schools in the districts (with 2023–24 enrollment data from the National Center for Education Statistics) are High Bridge Elementary School with 210 students in grades PreK–4 and High Bridge Middle School with 141 students in grades 5–8.

Public school students in ninth through twelfth grades attend Voorhees High School, which also serves students from Califon, Glen Gardner, Hampton, Lebanon Township and Tewksbury Township. As of the 2023–24 school year, the high school had an enrollment of 753 students and 73.9 classroom teachers (on an FTE basis), for a student–teacher ratio of 10.2:1. The school is part of the North Hunterdon-Voorhees Regional High School District, which also includes students from Bethlehem Township, Clinton Town, Clinton Township, Franklin Township, Lebanon Borough and Union Township who are designated to attend North Hunterdon High School in Annandale.

The High Bridge district previously operated High Bridge High School. In October 1972, voters agreed to place the high schoolers at North Hunterdon Regional High School. High Bridge High closed in 1973. In 1975, high school students in High Bridge, except 12th grade students (seniors) already at North Hunterdon, were moved to Voorhees High.

Eighth grade students from all of Hunterdon County are eligible to apply to attend the high school programs offered by the Hunterdon County Vocational School District, a county-wide vocational school district that offers career and technical education at its campuses in Raritan Township and at programs sited at local high schools, with no tuition charged to students for attendance.

== Transportation ==
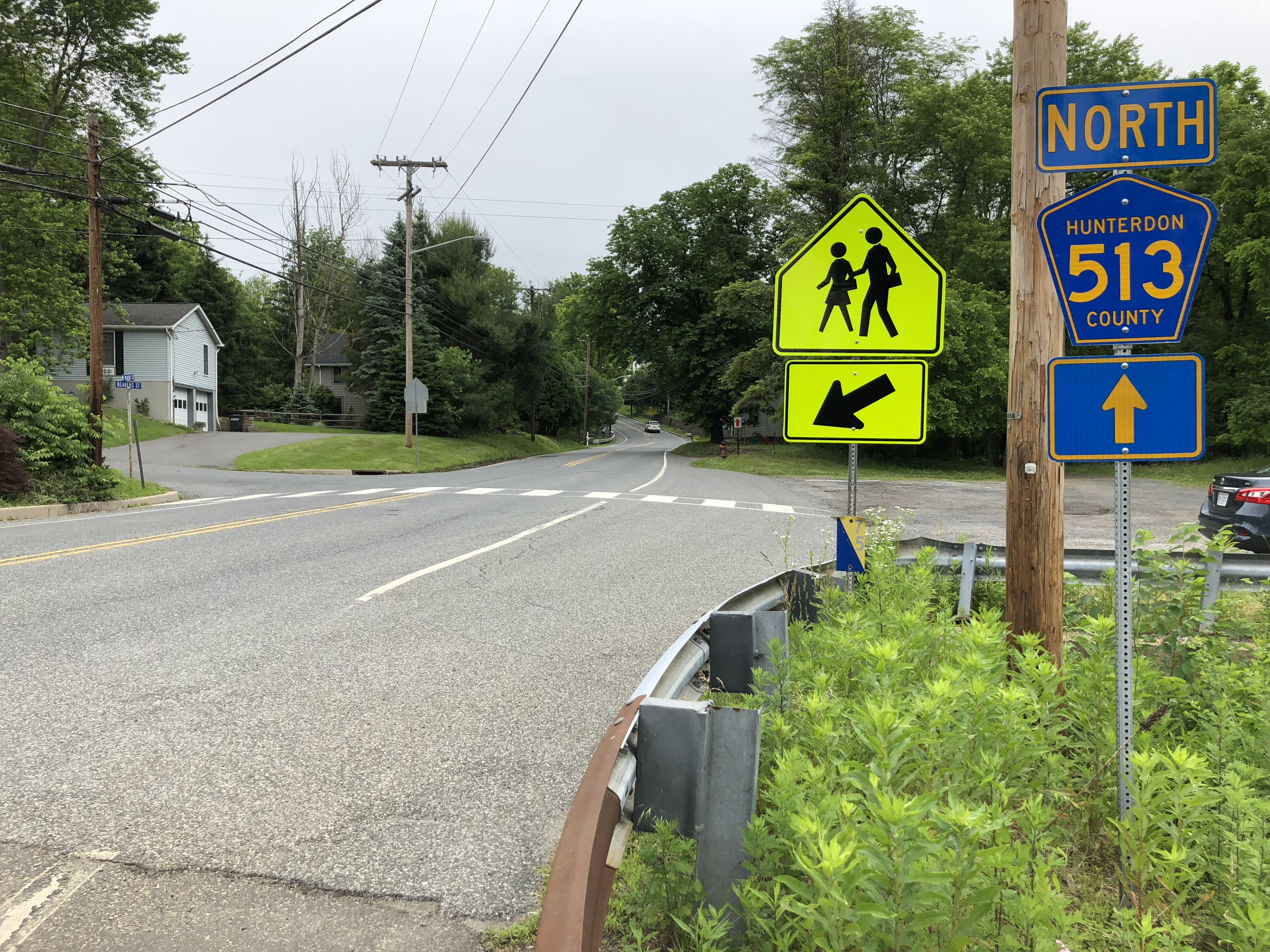
County Route 513 in High Bridge

=== Roads and highways ===
As of May 2010, the borough had a total of 21.00 miles (33.80 km) of roadways, of which 18.99 miles (30.56 km) were maintained by the municipality and 2.01 miles (3.23 km) by Hunterdon County.

County Route 513 is the main road that passes through and connects to Route 31 to the west. Interstate 78 is accessible via Routes 513 and 31 in neighboring Clinton Township.

=== Public transportation ===
Originally a vital junction for the Central Railroad of New Jersey in hauling iron ore from northern New Jersey via its High Bridge Branch which headed north toward Wharton and High Bridge station now serves as the westernmost station on NJ Transit's Raritan Valley Line. It is located at the southern end of the station. The parking lot for the station is located one block to the west. The station only uses the southern track for inbound and outbound trains. There is a station building that is no longer used and there are two small shelters. This station has limited weekday service and no weekend service. The station has been the western terminus of the line since 1983, the year NJ Transit commenced operations. Between 1983 and 1989, NJ Transit reached Phillipsburg, New Jersey on the former Central Railroad of New Jersey mainline. Since that time, the route between High Bridge and Phillipsburg has been inactive. NJ Transit considers making plans for bringing service back to Phillipsburg again in the future.

There is also service available between Flemington and Hampton on the Hunterdon LINK Route 15.

== Points of interest ==
Solitude House, built c. 1710–1725, became the centerpiece of the iron plantation that became Union Forge Ironworks. Later called Taylor Iron and Steel Company, it eventually became known as Taylor-Wharton. John Penn, the last royal governor of Pennsylvania, and Benjamin Chew, the last chief justice of the Supreme Court of Pennsylvania, were political prisoners at Solitude House during the American Revolutionary War. Five generations of the Taylor family managed the business and continued to live in the house, until 1938. Acquired by the Borough in 2001, and previously operated as a museum. The Union Forge Heritage Association operated Solitude House Museum from 2002 to 2012. The museum is now at the Turner–Chew–Carhart Farm in nearby Union Township.

The Taylor Steel Workers Historical Greenway, created by the Union Forge Heritage Association, connects to the Columbia Trail.

The TISCO Headquarters, constructed in 1742 for the Union Iron Works, is the oldest office building in New Jersey.

Lake Solitude Dam, replacing the crib dam of 1858, replaced in 1909, is the last remaining example of a buttress dam in New Jersey, built by master engineer Frank S. Tainter.

Springside Farm was established by Archibald S. Taylor, as the agricultural farm of the Taylor Iron and Steel Company. Covering 90 acres (36 ha), the site includes buildings dating back to 1803, some of which have deteriorated over the years.

The Paul Robinson Observatory is an astronomical observatory owned and operated by New Jersey Astronomical Association in nearby Voorhees State Park.

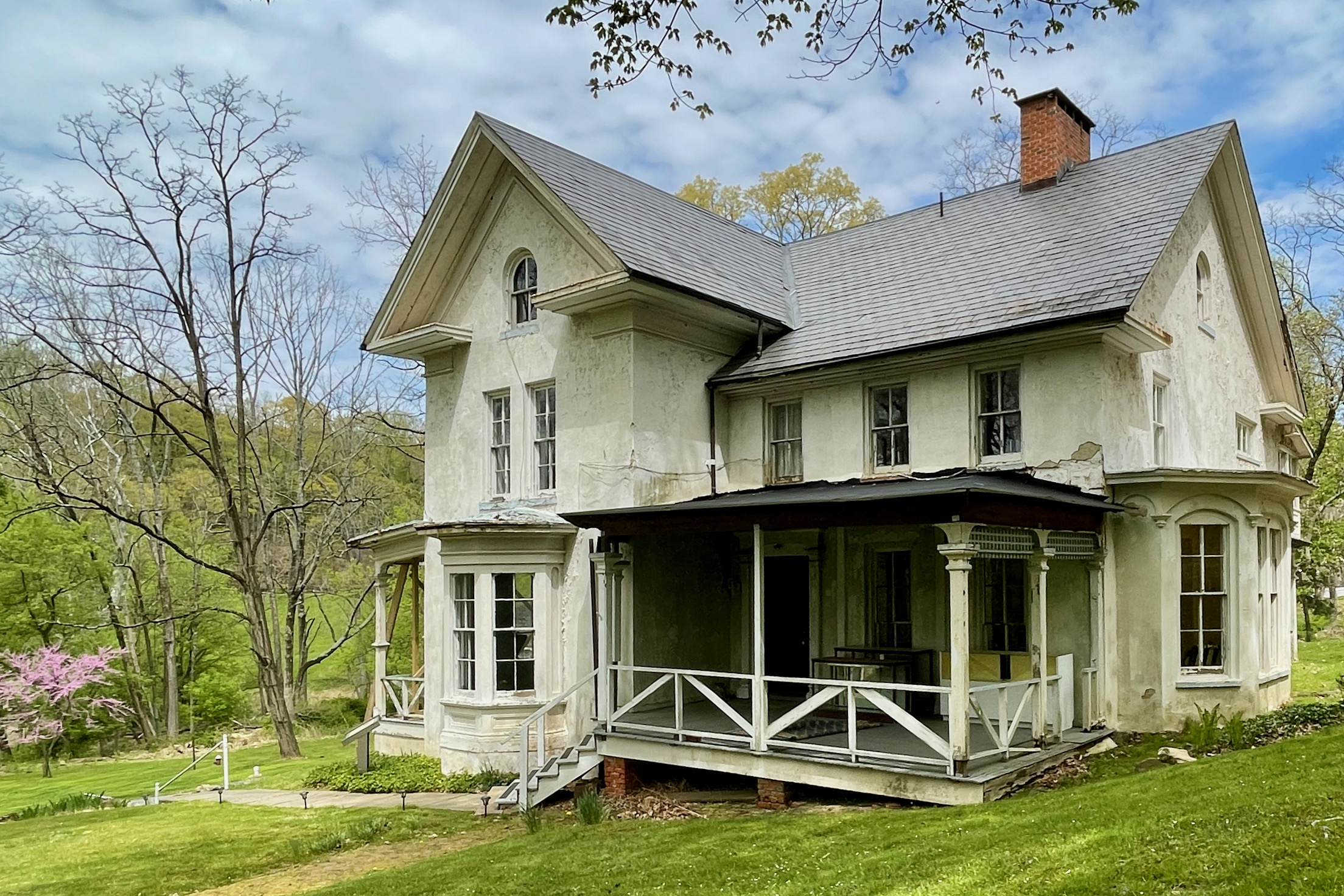
Solitude House

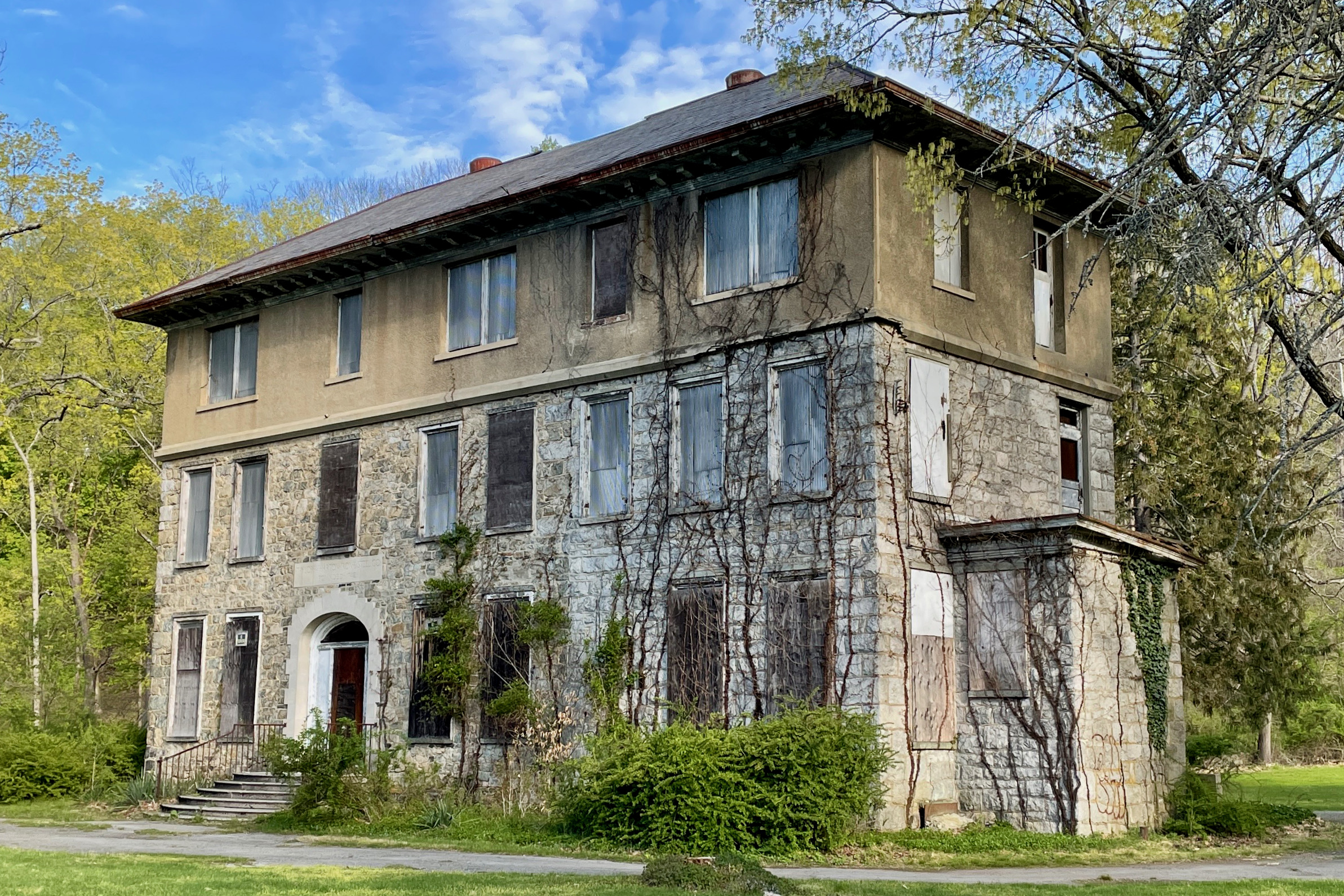
TISCO Office Building

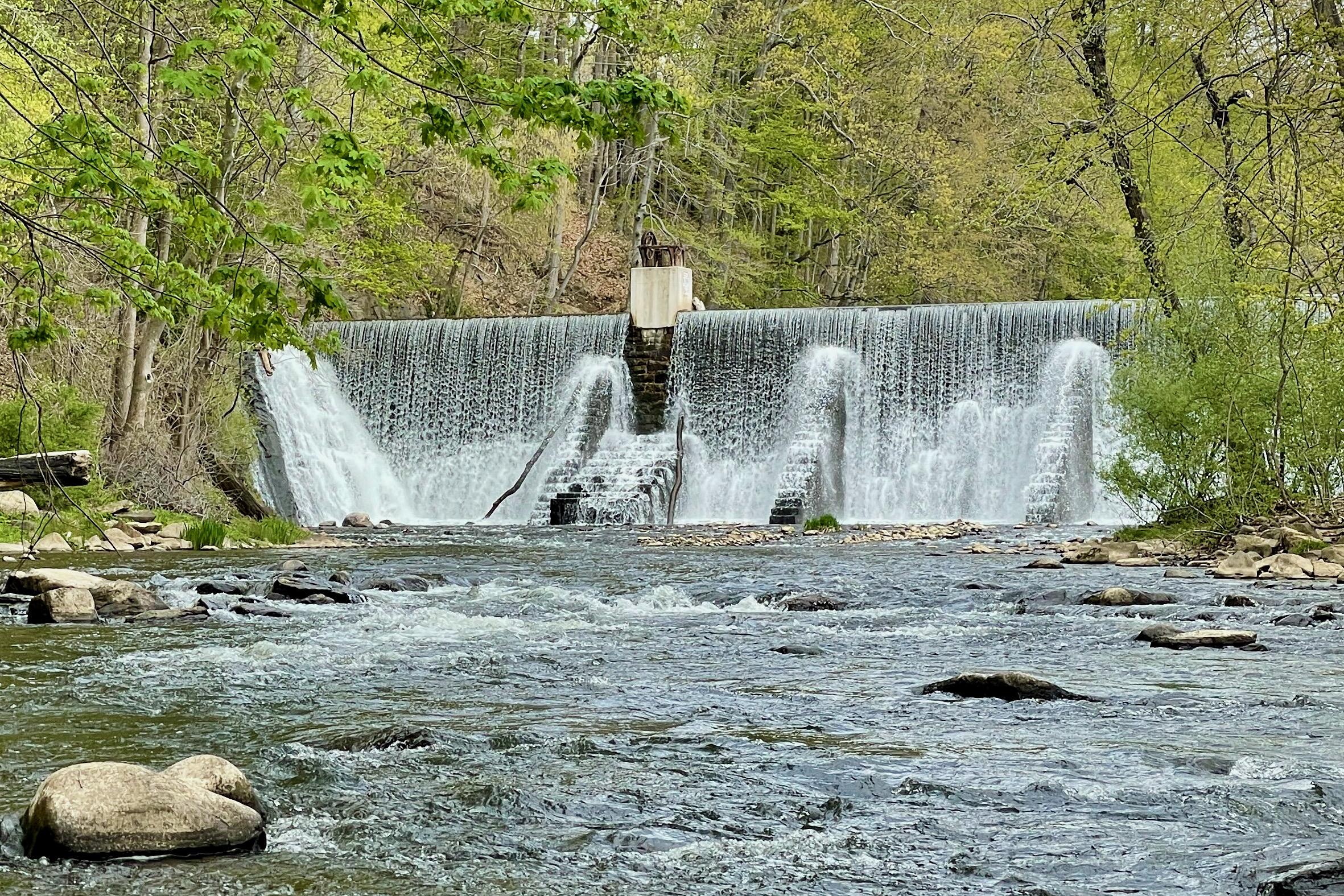
Lake Solitude Dam

== Notable people ==
People who were born in, residents of, or otherwise closely associated with High Bridge include:

- Frank Baldwin (1928–2004), Major League Baseball catcher who played for the Cincinnati Reds
- Florence Howe Hall (1845–1922), writer, critic, and lecturer about Women's suffrage in the United States
- Naomi Jakobsson (born 1941 as Naomi Dick), politician who represented the 103rd District in the Illinois House of Representatives
- Howard Menger (1922–2009), UFO contactee whose writings on the subject include The High Bridge Incident, about his initial contact with aliens, when he was ten years old
- Dan Smith (born 1975), former MLB pitcher who played for the Montreal Expos and Boston Red Sox
- George W. Taylor (1808–1862), Union Army brigadier general during the American Civil War
