= Milk Can Game =

The Milk Can Game can refer to:

- Milk Can (college football), an annual football game between Boise State University and Fresno State University
- Milk Can Game (high school football), an annual high school football game between North Hunterdon High School and Voorhees High School
