= High Bridge High School =

Former school in New Jersey, United States

High Bridge High School was a public high school for students in ninth through twelfth grades operated by the High Bridge School District in High Bridge, in Hunterdon County, New Jersey, in the U.S. state of New Jersey. The school was established in 1908 and closed in 1973.

The school was granted authority by the New Jersey Department of Education in 1908 to operate as a four-year high school and graduated its first students the following year. Facing the prospect of a costly new facility to accommodate increased enrollment, voters in High Bridge and in the regional district both passed separate October 1972 referendums under which High Bridge would place the district's high school students at North Hunterdon High School, which is operated as part of the North Hunterdon-Voorhees Regional High School District, with High Bridge becoming the district's 12th constituent municipality. High Bridge High School closed in 1973, with a final graduating class of 39 students and an enrollment of 180 students. In 1975, Voorhees High School opened, to relieve overcrowding at North Hunterdon High, and students from High Bridge were reassigned there, with the exception of incoming 12th graders, who remained at North Hunterdon.
