= High Bridge School District =

School district in Hunterdon County, New Jersey, US

Address
- 50 Thomas Street High Bridge, Hunterdon County, New Jersey, 08829; United States
- Coordinates: 40.668947°N 74.891755°W

District information
- Grades: PreK-8
- Superintendent: Gregory Hobaugh
- Business administrator: Karolina Cywa
- Schools: 2

Students and staff
- Enrollment: 351 (as of 2023–24)
- Faculty: 42.0 FTEs
- Student–teacher ratio: 8.4:1

Other information
- District Factor Group: GH
- Website: www.hbschools.org
Ind.	Per pupil	District spending	Rank (*)	K-8 average	%± vs. average
1A	Total Spending	$23,010	58	$18,891	21.8%
1	Budgetary Cost	19,925	61	14,159	40.7%
2	Classroom Instruction	12,194	65	8,659	40.8%
6	Support Services	3,372	53	2,167	55.6%
8	Administrative Cost	1,848	60	1,547	19.5%
10	Operations & Maintenance	1,698	30	1,612	5.3%
13	Extracurricular Activities	131	32	104	26.0%
16	Median Teacher Salary	68,505	65	61,136
Data from NJDoE 2014 Taxpayers' Guide to Education Spending. *Of K-8 districts with up to 400 students. Lowest spending=1; Highest=71

The High Bridge School District is a comprehensive community public school district that serves students in pre-kindergarten through eighth grade from High Bridge, in Hunterdon County, in the U.S. state of New Jersey.

As of the 2023–24 school year, the district, comprised of two schools, had an enrollment of 351 students and 42.0 classroom teachers (on an FTE basis), for a student–teacher ratio of 8.4:1.

The district participates in the Interdistrict Public School Choice Program, which allows non-resident students to attend school in the district at no cost to their parents, with tuition covered by the resident district. Available slots are announced annually by grade.

Public school students in ninth through twelfth grades attend Voorhees High School, which also serves students from Califon, Glen Gardner, Hampton, Lebanon Township and Tewksbury Township. As of the 2023–24 school year, the high school had an enrollment of 753 students and 73.9 classroom teachers (on an FTE basis), for a student–teacher ratio of 10.2:1. The school is part of the North Hunterdon-Voorhees Regional High School District, which also includes students from Bethlehem Township, Clinton Town, Clinton Township, Franklin Township, Lebanon Borough and Union Township who are designated to attend North Hunterdon High School in Annandale.

== History ==
The district previously operated High Bridge High School. The school first opened circa 1903. In October 1972, voters agreed to place the district's high school students at North Hunterdon Regional High School, making High Bridge the twelfth community participating in the regional district. High Bridge High closed in 1973; at the time there were 180 students, and 39 students had graduated in the final graduation. In 1975, high school students from High Bridge, with the exception of students in twelfth grade, were switched to Voorhees High School.

The district had been classified by the New Jersey Department of Education as being in District Factor Group "GH", the third-highest of eight groupings. District Factor Groups organize districts statewide to allow comparison by common socioeconomic characteristics of the local districts. From lowest socioeconomic status to highest, the categories are A, B, CD, DE, FG, GH, I and J.

== Schools ==
Schools in the districts (with 2023–24 enrollment data from the National Center for Education Statistics) are:

Elementary school

- High Bridge Elementary School with 210 students in grades PreK–4
  - Gregory Hobaugh, principal

Middle school

- High Bridge Middle School with 141 students in grades 5–8
  - Richard J. Kolton, principal

== Administration ==
Core members of the district's administration are:

- Gregory Hobaugh, superintendent
- Karolina Cywa, business administrator and board secretary

== Board of education ==
The district's board of education, comprised of nine members, sets policy and oversees the fiscal and educational operation of the district through its administration. As a Type II school district, the board's trustees are elected directly by voters to serve three-year terms of office on a staggered basis, with three seats up for election each year held (since 2012) as part of the November general election. The board appoints a superintendent to oversee the district's day-to-day operations and a business administrator to supervise the business functions of the district.
