= Voorhees State Park =

State Park in United States

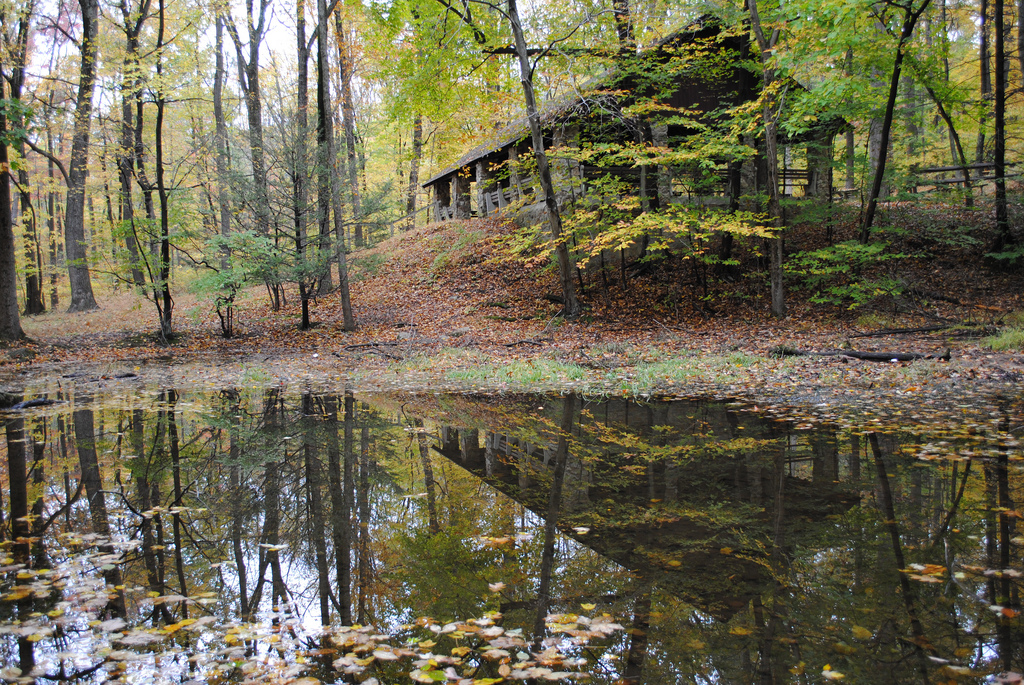
- A lakeside pavilion and autumn foliage at Voorhees State Park in Hunterdon County New Jersey.

- Location within Hunterdon County, New Jersey Location within New Jersey Location within the United States
- Location: Lebanon Township
- Coordinates: 40°41′46″N 74°53′14″W
- Area: 1,400 acres (5.7 km^{2})
- Opened: 1927
- Operator: New Jersey Division of Parks and Forestry
- Website: Official website

Voorhees State Park is a state park in the U.S. state of New Jersey. It is 1,400 acres (5.7 km^{2}) in area and is located in Lebanon Township. The park is operated and maintained by the New Jersey Division of Parks and Forestry.

== History ==
Voorhees State Park began in 1929 when Foster M. Voorhees, a former governor of New Jersey, donated his 325-acre (1.32 km^{2}) farm to the people of New Jersey. Succeeding land acquisitions increased the park size to 640 acres (2.6 km^{2}).

During the Great Depression in the 1930s, the park served as a camp for the Civilian Conservation Corps (CCC), which planted trees and constructed shelters and trails throughout. The park offers views of Round Valley Reservoir and Spruce Run Reservoir. Camping is allowed in the park for a fee, depending on the type of campsite. There are 47 tent and trailer campsites. There are two group campsites that can accommodate up to 50 people each. There are also three rustic, cabin-like structures with wood stoves for heat. Each cabin can accommodate up to four people in two double-deck single bunk beds. All sites and cabins have fire rings and picnic tables. Toilets and showers are within walking distance from the all campsites and cabins. The trailer sanitary station is open April 1 through October 31. Campsites and cabins are open all year.

In 1965, the New Jersey Astronomical Association built the Paul Robinson Observatory on land leased from the state. The observatory features a 26 inches (66 cm) Cassegrain reflecting telescope and offers public sky-watch programs.

Voorhees State Park main entrance is across the street (County Route 513) from Voorhees High School; also named after Foster M. Voorhees.

In November 2024, the NJDEP announced a $6,500 federal grant dedicated to trail construction and improvement within Voorhees State Park.

== Gallery ==
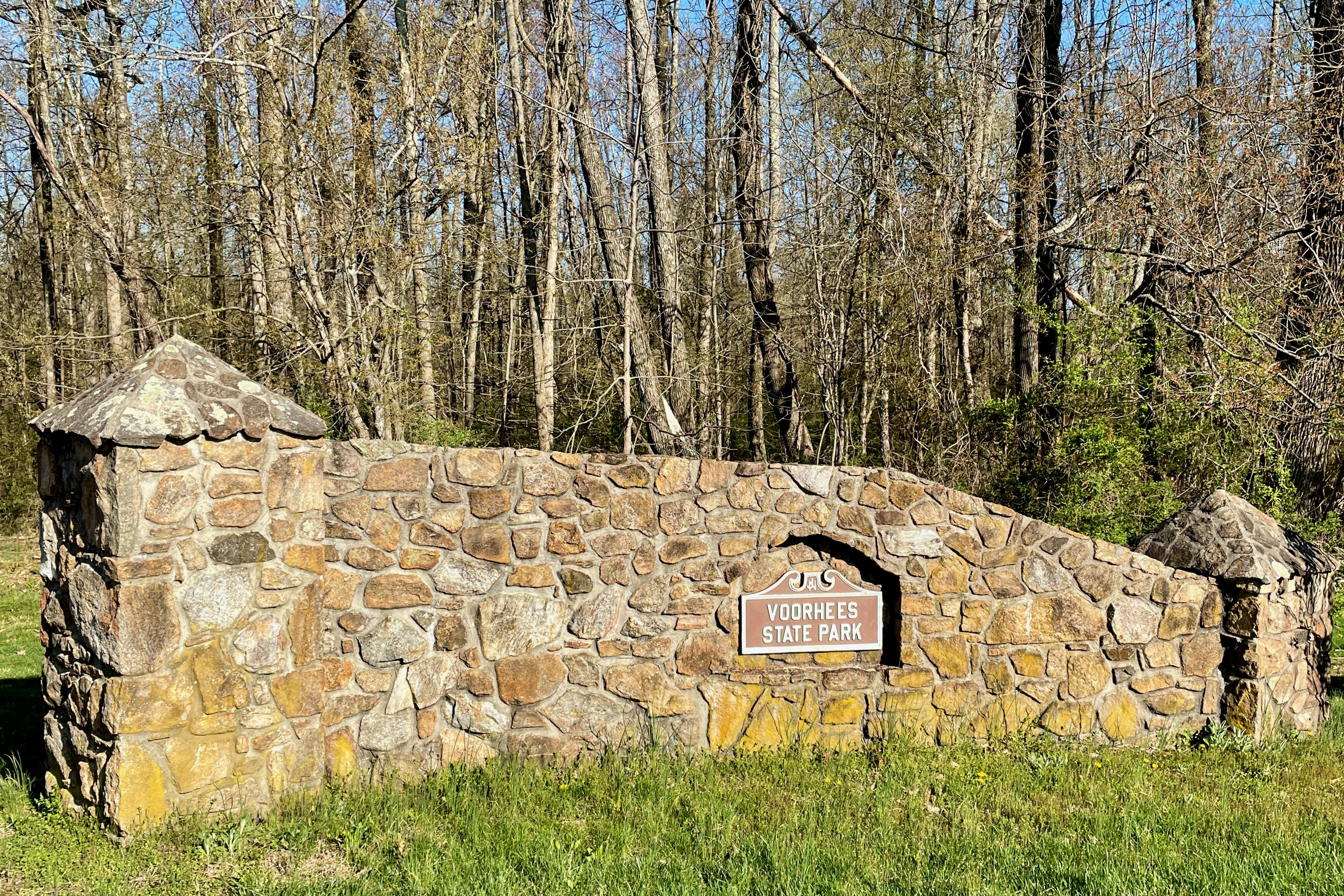
Entrance

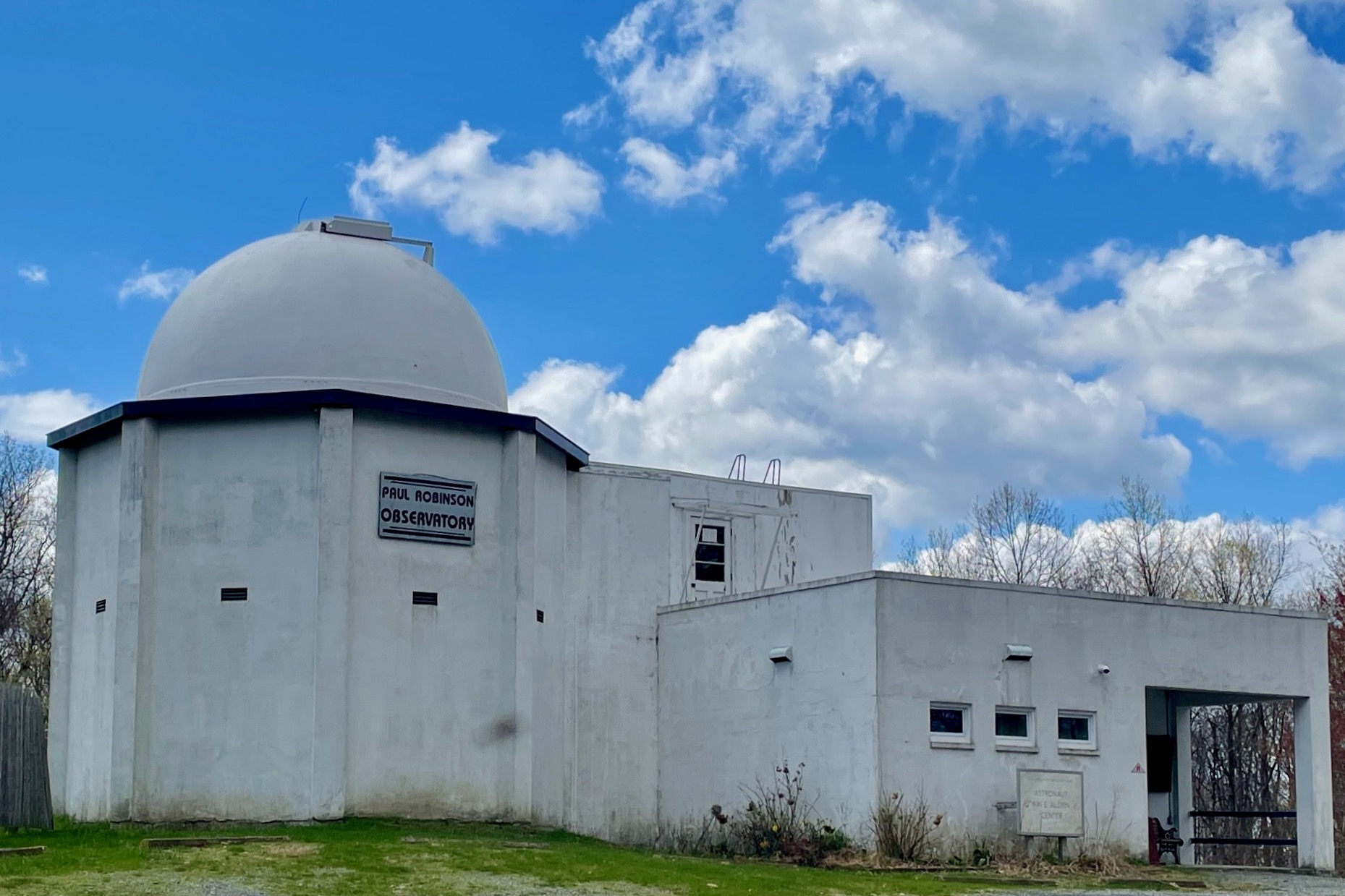
Paul Robinson Observatory

== See also ==
- List of New Jersey state parks
- Voorhees High School
