= High Bridge Reformed Church =

Historic church in New Jersey, United States

- U.S. National Register of Historic Places
- New Jersey Register of Historic Places
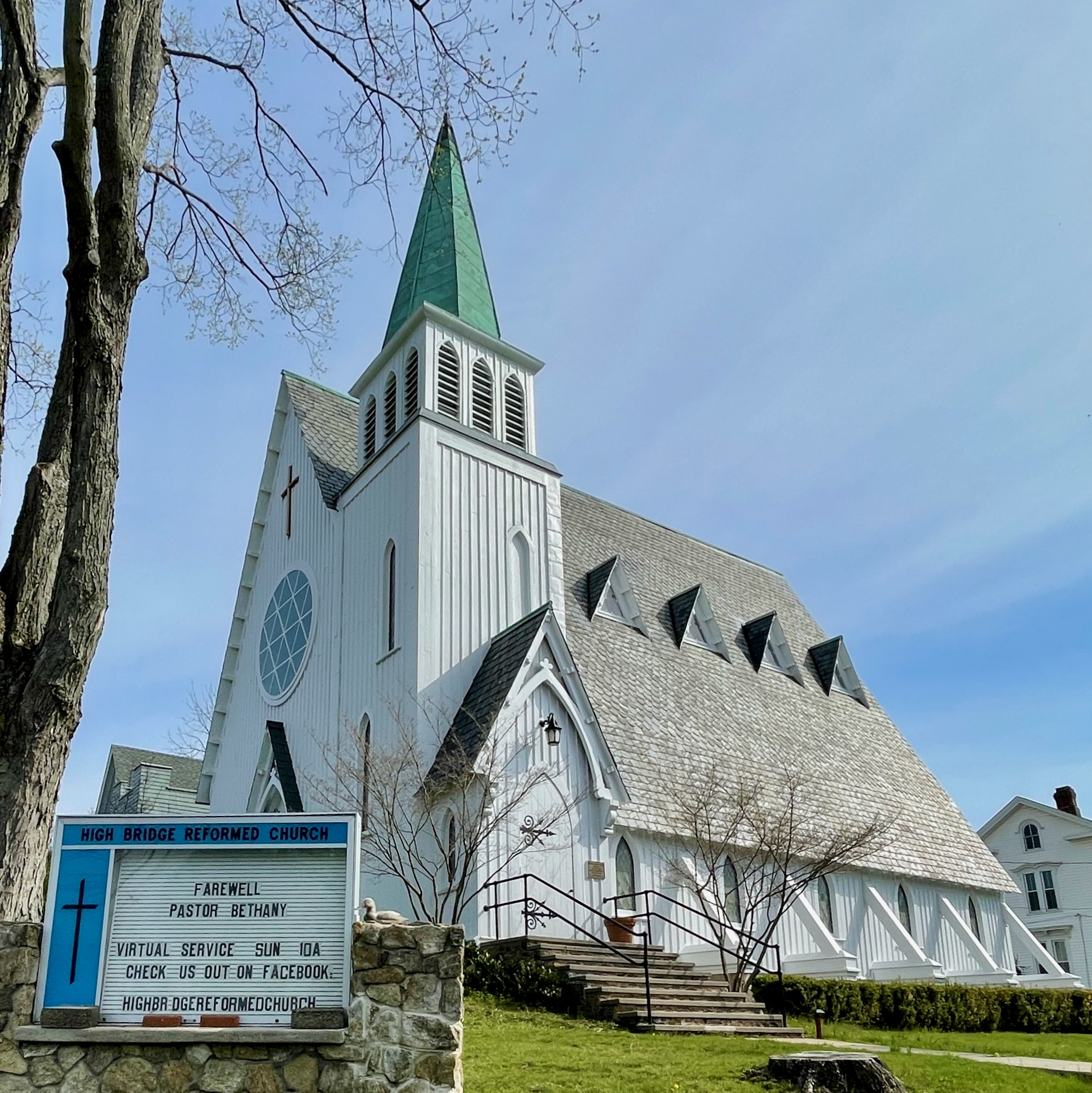
- High Bridge Reformed Church in 2021

- Location within Hunterdon County, New Jersey Location within New Jersey Location within the United States
- Location: Church Street and CR 513, High Bridge, New Jersey
- Coordinates: 40°40′13″N 74°53′41″W
- Area: 1.1 acres (0.45 ha)
- Built: 1870
- Architect: George B. Post, Joseph Fowler
- Architectural style: Carpenter Gothic
- NRHP reference No.: 80002494
- NJRHP No.: 1593

Significant dates
- Added to NRHP: November 21, 1980
- Designated NJRHP: August 14, 1980

High Bridge Reformed Church is a historic church located at Church Street and County Route 513 in High Bridge in Hunterdon County, New Jersey. The church, built in 1870, is part of the Reformed Church in America. It was added to the National Register of Historic Places on November 21, 1980, for its significance in architecture and religion.

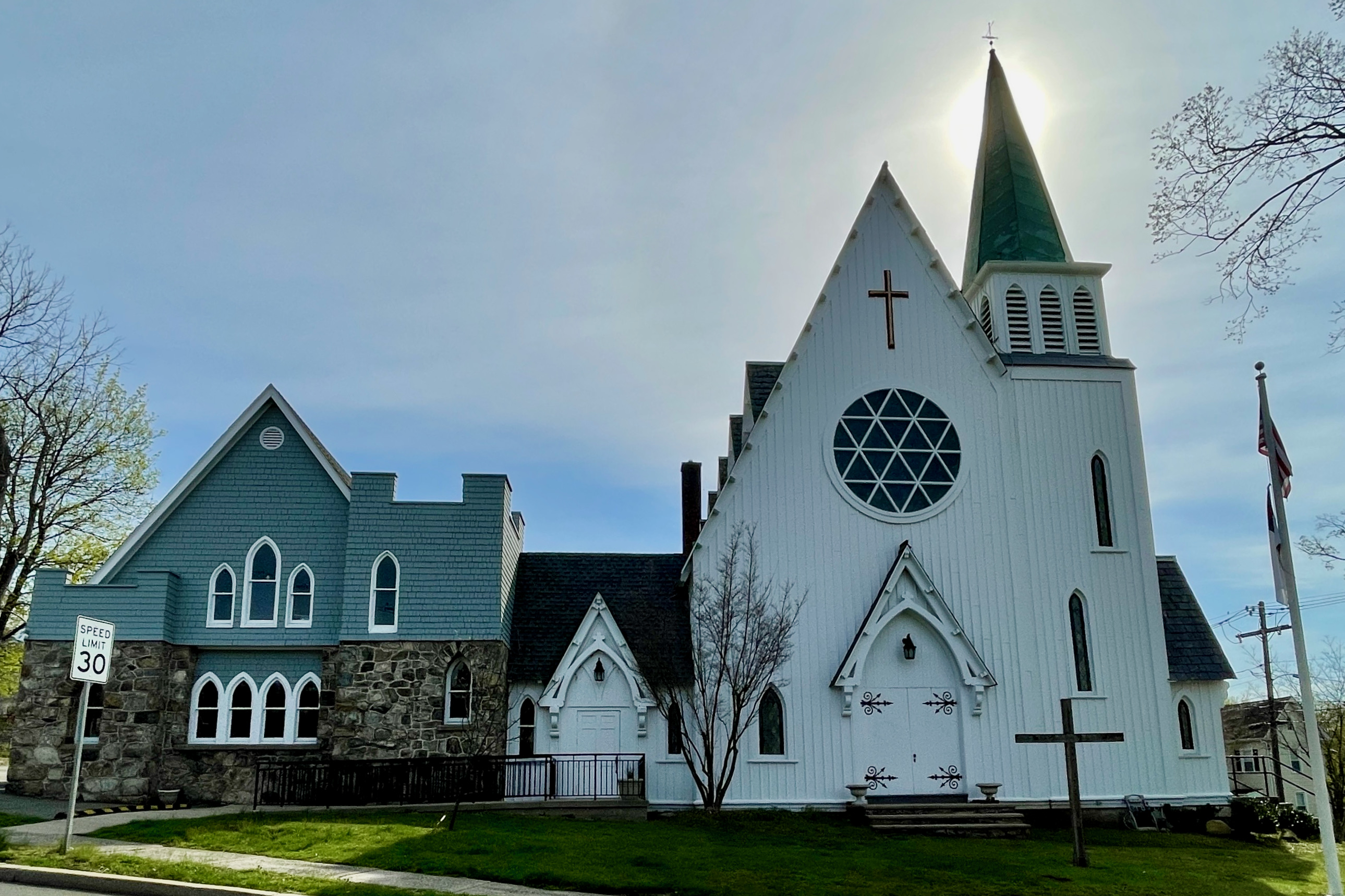
High Bridge Reformed Church and Chapel

== See also ==
- National Register of Historic Places listings in Hunterdon County, New Jersey
