= North Hunterdon-Voorhees Regional High School District =

School district in Hunterdon County, New Jersey, US

North Hunterdon-Voorhees Regional HS District
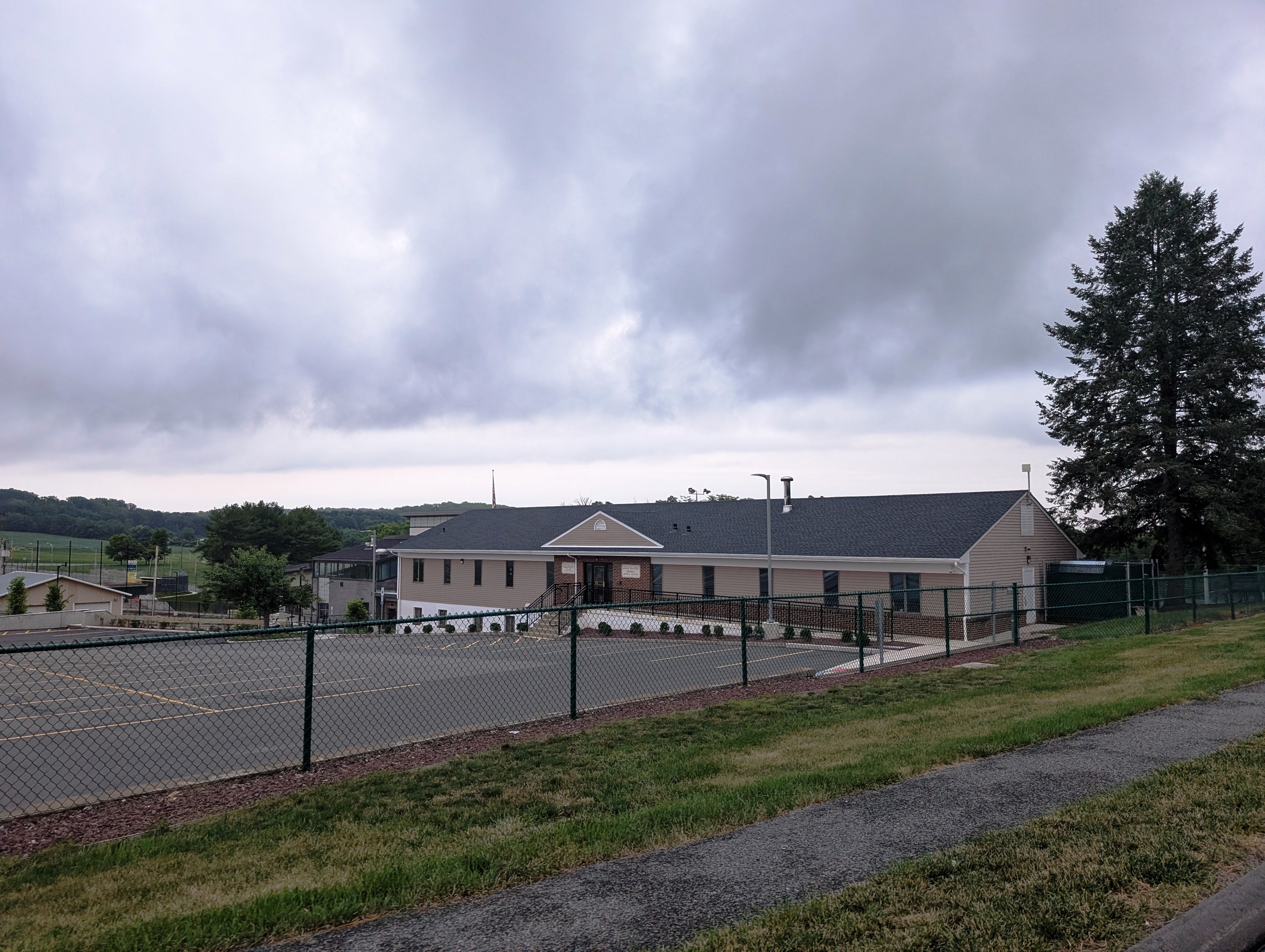
- District offices in Clinton Township

Address
- 1445 State Route 31 Annandale, Hunterdon County, New Jersey, 08801; United States
- Coordinates: 40.629221°N 74.881603°W

District information
- Grades: 9-12
- Superintendent: Richard Bergacs
- Business administrator: Kathryn Blew
- Schools: 2

Students and staff
- Enrollment: 2,044 (as of 2023–24)
- Faculty: 189.4 FTEs
- Student–teacher ratio: 10.8:1

Other information
- District Factor Group: I
- Website: www.nhvweb.net
Ind.	Per pupil	District spending	Rank (*)	9-12 average	%± vs. average
1A	Total Spending	$20,361	22	$18,891	7.8%
1	Budgetary Cost	18,068	41	15,592	15.9%
2	Classroom Instruction	9,862	39	8,807	12.0%
6	Support Services	2,589	32	2,294	12.9%
8	Administrative Cost	1,676	25	1,592	5.3%
10	Operations & Maintenance	2,586	47	1,954	32.3%
13	Extracurricular Activities	1,313	44	873	50.4%
16	Median Teacher Salary	65,570	19	71,726
Data from NJDoE 2014 Taxpayers' Guide to Education Spending. *Of 9-12 districts with any number of students. Lowest spending=1; Highest=47

The North Hunterdon-Voorhees Regional High School District is a regional, four-year public high school district, that serves students in ninth through twelfth grades from twelve municipalities in northern Hunterdon County, in the U.S. state of New Jersey. Students in the district are from Bethlehem Township, Califon Borough, Clinton Town, Clinton Township, Franklin Township, Glen Gardner Borough, Hampton Borough, High Bridge Borough, Lebanon Borough, Lebanon Township, Tewksbury Township and Union Township.

As of the 2023–24 school year, the district, comprised of two schools, had an enrollment of 2,044 students and 189.4 classroom teachers (on an FTE basis), for a student–teacher ratio of 10.8:1.

== History ==
In a June 1947 referendum, 11 of the 13 municipalities voted in favor of the formation of a regional high school district, with Bloomsbury and High Bridge opting out, leading to a reduction to the size of the plans for the school building, which was scaled down from an original planned enrollment of 700, down to 600 students. A referendum the next month failed when 10 of the 11 municipalities voted in favor by a better than 5-1 margin, while Franklin Township voters rejected the proposal. All 11 of the districts voted to approve a February 1950 referendum for a building that would cost $700,000 (equivalent to $9,400,000 in 2025). North Hunterdon Regional High School opened in September 1951 with 517 students in a 27-room facility constructed on a 45-acre (18 ha) site.

In October 1972, voters of the 11 municipalities and those in High Bridge, New Jersey, approved separate referendums under which the High Bridge School District would close High Bridge High School in June 1973 and students from the borough would start attending the regional school.

Voorhees High School, constructed at a cost of $7.5 million (equivalent to $44.9 million in 2025), opened for the 1975-76 school year.

The Clinton Township School District had undertaken a project to consider the possibility of withdrawing from the North Hunterdon-Voorhees Regional High School District to form an independent K-12 school district. In February 2005, the Clinton Township Board of Education commissioned a study to consider the educational and financial effects of a proposed withdrawal scenario for Clinton Township, citing higher costs assessed to township residents under the funding formula then in place, through the district ultimately withdrew its withdrawal petition in December 2006.

The Bloomsbury School District has sought to end its sending/receiving relationship with Phillipsburg as part of its goal to become part of the North Hunterdon-Voorhees school district. Residents of Bloomsbury will vote in November 2026 in a referendum to join as a constituent member of North Hunterdon-Voorhees.

The district had been classified by the New Jersey Department of Education as being in District Factor Group "I", the second-highest of eight groupings. District Factor Groups organize districts statewide to allow comparison by common socioeconomic characteristics of the local districts. From lowest socioeconomic status to highest, the categories are A, B, CD, DE, FG, GH, I and J.

== Awards and recognition ==
For the 2001–02 school year, North Hunterdon High School received the Blue Ribbon Award from the United States Department of Education, the highest honor that an American school can achieve.

In 2015, Voorhees High School was one of 15 schools in New Jersey, and one of nine public schools, recognized as a National Blue Ribbon School in the exemplary high performing category.

== Schools ==
Schools in the district (with 2023–24 enrollment data from the National Center for Education Statistics) are:

- North Hunterdon High School is located in Clinton Township (although the mailing address is Annandale). The school served 1,262 students from Bethlehem Township, Bloomsbury, Clinton Town, Clinton Township, Franklin Township, Lebanon Borough and Union Township.
  - Gregory Cottrell, principal
- Voorhees High School is located in Lebanon Township (although the mailing address is Glen Gardner). The school served 753 students from Califon, Glen Gardner, Hampton, High Bridge, Lebanon Township and Tewksbury Township.
  - Ron Peterson, principal

== Administration ==
Core members of the district's administration are:

- Richard Bergacs, superintendent
- Kathryn Blew, business administrator and board secretary

== Board of education ==
The district's board of education, comprised of 12 members, sets policy and oversees the fiscal and educational operation of the district through its administration. As a Type II school district, the board's trustees are elected directly by voters to serve three-year terms of office on a staggered basis, with four seats up for election each year held (since 2012) as part of the November general election. The board appoints a superintendent to oversee the district's day-to-day operations and a business administrator to supervise the business functions of the district. Seats on the board are allocated to the constituent municipalities and are assigned weighted votes based on population, with the total number of weighted votes equal to 12.1: Clinton Township and Lebanon Borough are allocated four seats between them, each with 0.9 weighted votes (a total of 3.6); High Bridge and Lebanon Township are allocated two seats between them, each with 1.2 votes (total of 2.4); Clinton Town, Franklin Township and Glen Gardner have two seats between them, each with 0.9 votes (total of 1.8); Califon and Tewksbury Township are allocated two seats between them, each with 0.8 weighted votes (total of 1.6); Union Township is assigned one seat with 1.4 weighted votes; and Bethlehem Township and Hampton are assigned one seat between them, with 1.3 weighted votes.
