= Paul Robinson Observatory =

Observatory in New Jersey, US

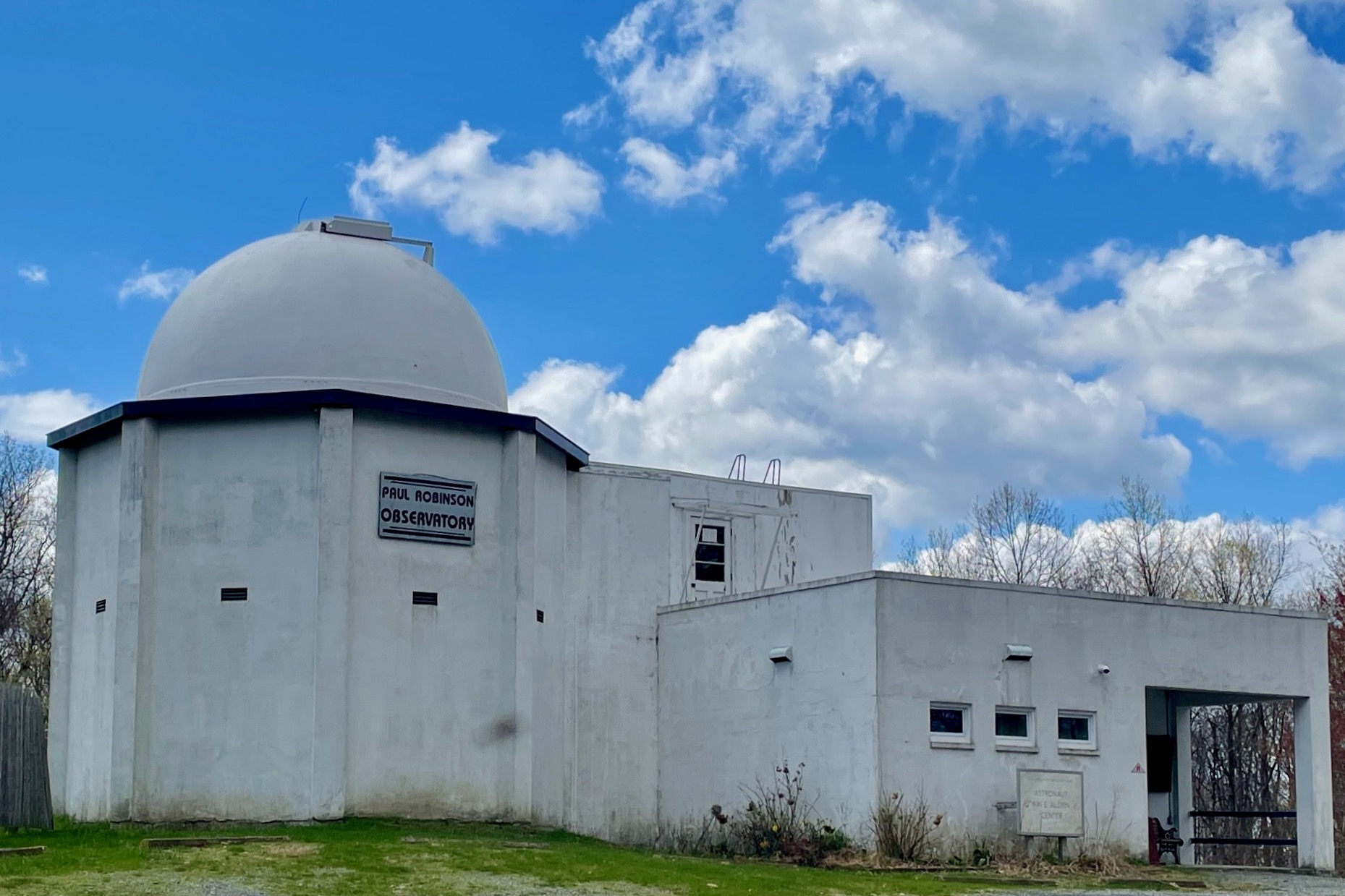
- Paul Robinson Observatory in 2021
- Observatory code: W67
- Location: Voorhees State Park, Lebanon Township, United States
- Coordinates: 40°40′54″N 74°53′53″W
- Website: www.njaa.org/observatory.html

Paul Robinson Observatory is an astronomical observatory owned and operated by the New Jersey Astronomical Association. It is located at Voorhees State Park in Lebanon Township, New Jersey.

== See also ==
- List of observatories
