= North Hunterdon High School =

School district in Hunterdon County, New Jersey, US

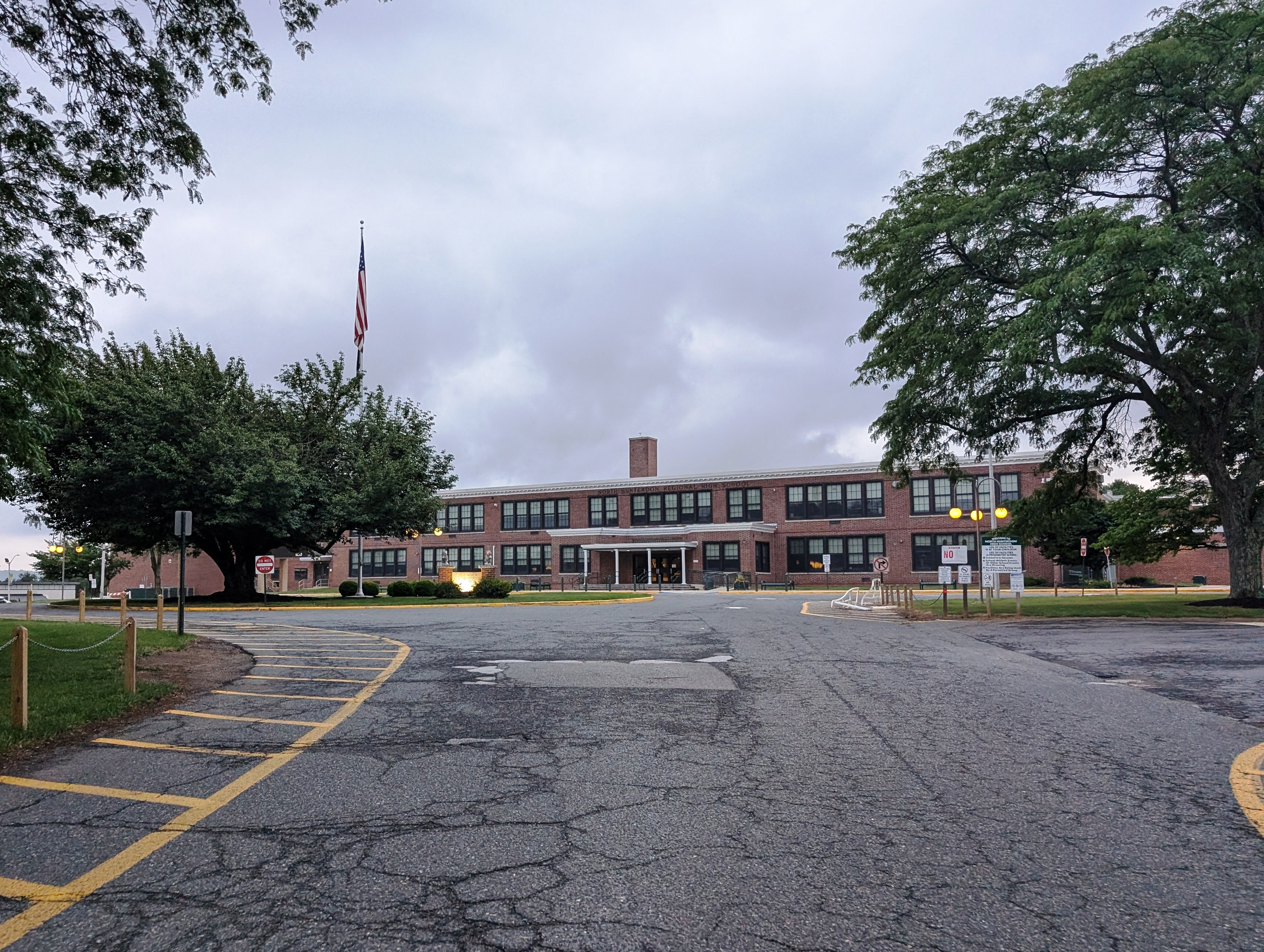
- Eastern entrnace

Location
- 1445 Route 31; Clinton Township, Hunterdon County, New Jersey 08801; United States; 40.629221°N 74.881603°W

Information
- Type: Regional public high school
- Established: September 1951
- School district: North Hunterdon-Voorhees Regional High School District
- NCES School ID: 341161003024
- Principal: Timothy Flynn
- Faculty: 116.0 FTEs
- Grades: 9-12
- Enrollment: 1,259 (as of 2024–25)
- Student to teacher ratio: 10.9:1
- Colors: Green and Gold
- Athletics conference: Skyland Conference (general); Big Central Football Conference (football)
- Mascot: Reggie
- Team name: Lions
- Rival: Voorhees High School
- Accreditation: Middle States Association of Colleges and Schools
- Website: www.nhvweb.net/nhhs/

North Hunterdon High School is a four-year regional public high school serving students from six municipalities in northern Hunterdon County, in the U.S. state of New Jersey. It is one of two high schools in the North Hunterdon-Voorhees Regional High School District.

Students from Bethlehem Township, Clinton Township, Franklin Township, Lebanon Borough and Union Township attend North Hunterdon; the school is located in the Annandale section of Clinton Township. Clinton Town and Glen Gardner residents can select either North Hunterdon or Voorhees High.

The school is accredited until January 2030 by the Middle States Association of Colleges and Schools Commission on Elementary and Secondary Schools.

As of the 2024–25 school year, the school had an enrollment of 1,259 students and 116.0 classroom teachers (on an FTE basis), for a student–teacher ratio of 10.9:1. There were 40 students (3.2% of enrollment) eligible for free lunch and 12 (1.0% of students) eligible for reduced-cost lunch.

The school's athletic team name is known as the Lions, and its mascot's name is Reggie, recognizing that the school was known as Regional in the past. In the 1968–69 school year, an actual lion cub was used as a mascot.

== History ==
In the 1950s, all 11 of the original sending districts voted to pass a referendum for construction of a building that would cost $700,000 (equivalent to $9.4 million in 2025). North Hunterdon Regional High School opened in September 1951 with 517 students in a 27-room facility constructed on a 45-acre (18 ha) site.

G. Clifford Singley was the school's first principal, and the football field was named in his honor in 1972.

In October 1972, voters of High Bridge agreed to place the borough's high school students at North Hunterdon Regional High. High Bridge High School in High Bridge School District closed in 1973. In 1975, Voorhees High opened, relieving North Hunterdon High. Students in the following areas, except for incoming 12th graders (seniors), were reassigned to Voorhees High: Califon, High Bridge, Lebanon Township, and Tewksbury Township.

Prior to 2014, Clinton Town students were zoned to North Hunterdon High, after which Clinton and Glen Gardner residents were given the option to select which high school they wished to attend.

== Awards, recognition and rankings ==
For the 2001–02 school year, North Hunterdon High School was awarded the Blue Ribbon School Award of Excellence by the United States Department of Education, the highest award an American school can receive.

In its 2013 report on "America's Best High Schools", The Daily Beast ranked the school 623rd in the nation among participating public high schools and 48th among schools in New Jersey.

In the 2011 "Ranking America's High Schools" issue by The Washington Post, the school was ranked 23rd in New Jersey and 759th nationwide. The school was ranked 654th nationwide, the 19th-highest in New Jersey, in Newsweek magazine's 2010 rankings of America's Best High Schools. In Newsweek's May 22, 2007, issue, ranking the country's top high schools, North Hunterdon High School was listed in 587th place, the 11th-highest ranked school in New Jersey.

The school was the 45th-ranked public high school in New Jersey out of 339 schools statewide in New Jersey Monthly magazine's September 2014 cover story on the state's "Top Public High Schools", using a new ranking methodology. The school had been ranked 66th in the state of 328 schools in 2012, after being ranked 60th in 2010 out of 322 schools listed. The magazine ranked the school 43rd in 2008 out of 316 schools. The school was ranked 37th in the magazine's September 2006 issue, which included 316 schools across the state. Schooldigger.com ranked the school tied for 36th out of 381 public high schools statewide in its 2011 rankings (an increase of 7 positions from the 2010 ranking) which were based on the combined percentage of students classified as proficient or above proficient on the mathematics (93.0%) and language arts literacy (98.6%) components of the High School Proficiency Assessment (HSPA).

In 2016, U.S. News & World Report ranked North Hunterdon as the 39th best high school in New Jersey and 895th in the nation.

In 2019, North Hunterdon High School announced that their yearbook, Regis, won first place in the American Scholastic Press Association's annual yearbook competition and second place (Silver Award) from the Garden State Scholastic Press Association's annual yearbook contest.

== In the news ==
In 2021, a group of approximately ten parents demanded that the North Hunterdon Regional High School District Board of Education ban books with certain LGBTQ themes from the school library. Speaking at a school board meeting, one parent called the books "evil" and "wicked." Another compared several books to child pornography, and said, "this amounts to an effort to groom our kids to make them more willing to participate in the heinous act described in these books." The books in question were Lawn Boy by Jonathan Evison and Gender Queer by Maia Kobabe, novels that contain LGBTQ+ content and have been recognized for excellence by the American Library Association’s Alex Award. The group also demanded a ban on Fun Home: A Family Tragicomic by Alison Bechdel, All Boys Aren't Blue by George M. Johnson and This Book Is Gay by Juno Dawson. The district's board of education ultimately decided to maintain access to all five books.

This protest for book censorship at NHHS sparked widespread attention, even receiving national coverage, including an article in The New York Times that details the targeted harassment of school librarian Martha Hickson. Details of the incident regarding Hickson were reported to the local police; according to the Times, "A complaint was made to the Clinton Township Police Department about obscene materials in a library book. The Hunterdon County Prosecutor’s Office said none of the information it received indicated criminal conduct." Hickson has been the target of personal attacks, hate mail, threats, bullying on social media, and nuisance vandalism.

In January 2024, the spouse of a newly seated board member posted videos harassing Hickson in connection with a parent’s attempt to ban Let’s Talk About It by Erika Moen and Matthew Nolan. After reviewing the book, the board of education voted to retain it in May 2024. That result prompted a supporter of book-banning to file ethics charges against the board members who voted to retain the book. The state's School Ethics Commission dismissed the complaint.

Hickson was named the 2023 Librarian of the Year by the New Jersey Library Association. She was recognized with the 2022 Lemony Snicket Prize for Noble Librarians Faced with Adversity by the American Library Association. Jury chair Becca Worthington said, "In the midst of adversity, she has remained a firm advocate for first amendment rights and a proud defender of her students' right to read, and the jury is thrilled to celebrate her triumphant spirit." Speaking to NJ Spotlight News, Hickson said, "Through the unfortunate experiences that I have had over the last couple of years, I have learned quite a bit about how to reach out to my community, build a network, use the infrastructure of the library community and the First Amendment community, and get protections for the students, for our library and even for myself.”

The harassment of Hickson and conflict over book-banning prompted state lawmakers to create new legislation protecting the rights of librarians and school readers. In January 2024, Sens. Andrew Zwicker (D-Middlesex) and Teresa Ruiz (D-Essex) introduced a revised version of the Freedom to Read Act. According to NJ Spotlight News, the bill will "set uniform guidelines for evaluating requests to challenge library materials... (and) prevent the removal of materials because of the origin, background or views of their authors. The legislation would also protect librarians from being sued for doing their jobs and enable them to file a civil action against someone who harasses them."

The attacks against Hickson are featured in the Emmy award-winning 2025 documentary “The Librarians,” which shows her testifying in favor of the bill before the NJ Assembly. The bill passed in October 2024, and Gov. Phil Murphy signed it into law in December 2024, handing the pen to Hickson.

In a joint statement, the New Jersey Library Association, the New Jersey School Library Association and the New Jersey Education Association said, "As parents, educators, administrators, and school board members, we stand united against prejudices, and politically motivated culture wars that target the right to read and access to education and information."

== Athletics ==
The North Hunterdon High School Lions compete in the Skyland Conference, which is comprised of public and private high schools in Hunterdon, Somerset and Warren counties in west Central Jersey, operating under the jurisdiction of the New Jersey State Interscholastic Athletic Association (NJSIAA). With 1,188 students in grades 10–12, the school was classified by the NJSIAA for the 2019–20 school year as Group IV for most athletic competition purposes, which included schools with an enrollment of 1,060 to 5,049 students in that grade range. The football team competes in Division 4 of the Big Central Football Conference, which includes 60 public and private high schools in Hunterdon, Middlesex, Somerset, Union and Warren counties, which are broken down into 10 divisions by size and location. The school was classified by the NJSIAA as Group IV North for football for 2024–2026, which included schools with 893 to 1,315 students.

The football team won the Central Jersey Group III state sectional championship in 1975 and the North II Group IV title in 2017. Since 1976, North Hunterdon High School's football team has competed in the annual Milk Can Game against rival Voorhees High School. After the conclusion of the game, a golden milk can is awarded to the winner, which earns bragging rights and ownership of the can until the next year's game. With a 14–7 win in 2018, North Hunterdon had won seven consecutive games in the series and holds an overall record of 30–12–1 in the 43 Milk Can games played between the two schools. NJ.com called the Milk Can "maybe the most famous trophy in New Jersey football" and listed the rivalry in the fifth spot on their 2007 list "Ranking the 31 fiercest rivalries in N.J. HS football". The 1975 team finished the season 10–0 after winning the Central Jersey Group III state sectional championship with a 27–18 win against Franklin High School in the tournament final. In 2017, the Lions football team won the North II, Group IV state sectional championship, the program's second state title, with a 21–20 win against top-seeded Phillipsburg High School in the final game of the tournament at MetLife Stadium; the Lions finished the season with a record of 11–1, their only loss being to Phillipsburg, during the regular season.

The girls' cross country team won the Group III state championship in 1980, 1981, 1983–1986 and 2000, won the Group IV title in 1982 and 2017–2019. The 10 state titles won by the program are ranked fourth in the state. The girls' cross country team won the Meet of Champions in 1980, 1981, 1983–1986 and 2017–2019; the program's nine state team titles are tied for most in the state.

The boys' wrestling team won the Central Jersey Group III state sectional championship in 1980, 1982, 1984, 1993–1997, 1999, 2000, 2002 and 2003; won the North II Group IV title in 2009, 2020, 2022, 2023 and 2025; and won the North II Group V title in 2015. The team won the Group III state title in 1982, 1984, 1993 and 2002, and won the Group IV title in 2020, 2023 and 2025.

The boys' cross country running team won the Group III state championship in 1981, 1983–1985, 1992–1995 and 2021. The team's nine state titles are tied for eighth-most in New Jersey. In each of the three years from 1990 to 1992, Brendan Heffernan won the individual Group III cross-country running championship, making him the fourth runner in state history to earn three individual state titles. In 2012, the boys' cross country team won the Skyland Conference Cross Country Championship.

The girls' spring track team was the Group III state champion in 1982, 1985–1987, and won the Group IV title in 1983.

The girls' track team won the Group III title in 1982 and 1986. The boys team won the indoor track Group III state championship in 1984.

The girls' basketball team won the Group III state championship in 1985 (defeating Malcolm X Shabazz High School in the tournament final), 1986 (vs. Hanover Park High School) and 1987 (vs. West Morris Mendham High School), and won the Group IV title in 2010 (vs. Eastern Regional High School). The 1986 team won the program's second straight Group III title after defeating Hanover Park 80–78 in the championship game to run their season record to 27–0 and their unbeaten streak to 55 games. The 1987 team won their third consecutive state title and extended their winning streak to 81 straight games with an 82–40 "demolishment" of West Morris Mendham in the Group III championship game at Rutgers University. In 2010, the Lady Lions varsity basketball team went 27–3, winning the Group IV title, the program's fourth state championship, with a 53–36 win over Eastern Regional. The team lost in the Tournament of Champions to Neptune High School by a score of 53–47.

The field hockey team won the North II, Group III state sectional championship in 1986 and 1993. The team won the Group III state championship in 2021 (defeating Moorestown High School in the tournament final) and 2023 (vs. Clearview Regional High School).

The softball team won the Group IV state championship in 2006 (defeating Steinert High School in the final of the tournament), 2014 (vs. Hillsborough High School) and 2018 (vs. Vineland High School). The 2006 team finished the season with a 27–3 record after defeating Steinert by a score of 2–0 to win the Group II championship game. The team won the 2007 North II, Group IV state sectional championship with an 8–0 win over J. P. Stevens High School. The 2008 team repeated as sectional champions with a 9–8 win in extra innings over Bridgewater-Raritan High School.

The boys' fencing team was the sabre team winner in 2004, was foil team winner in 2009 and was épée team winner in 2010. North Hunterdon won the boys team foil state championship in 2002. The boys fencing team took home the épée state title in the 03–04 season. In the 08–09 season, the boys fencing team took home the foil state title. The girls fencing team has taken home foil district champions in 05-06, and 06-07 seasons in addition to a sabre district championship title during the 05–06 season.

From 2012 to 2014, the girls' lacrosse team won the Hunterdon-Warren-Sussex Tournament championship in each of the three years. They won their first tournament title in 2012 against their rivals, Hunterdon Central, 14–10, on their home field. Once again in 2013, the girls lacrosse team defended its HWS title, winning against previously undefeated Sparta High School by a score of 20–12, in the tournament final played on their home field. The team won their third consecutive title in 2014, with a 21–7 win against Voorhees High School in the final game of the tournament playoff.

The girls' volleyball team won the Group IV state championship in 2013 (against runner-up Ridge High School) and 2018 (vs. Southern Regional High School), and won the Group III title in 2021 (vs. Colts Neck High School).

The girls' tennis team won the 2017 Hunterdon-Warren-Sussex Tournament, knocking off Hunterdon Central Regional High School, which had won the tournament each of the five previous years.

The school's marching band, the Golden Lions, accompany the football team at home and away games. They also participate in events such as the Columbus Day Parade in New York, as well as attending NJMBDA exhibitions.

== Administration ==
The school's principal is Timothy Flynn. His core administration team includes four assistant principals.

== Notable alumni ==
- Christian Bauman (born 1970, class of 1988), novelist (In Hoboken, Voodoo Lounge and The Ice Beneath You)
- Scott Bradlee (born 1981), pianist, composer and arranger who is the creator of the Postmodern Jukebox
- Gregg Cagno (born 1969, class of 1988), songwriter and touring performer in the singer-songwriter and folk genres
- Daryl Cobb (born 1961), children's book author
- Julie Culley (born 1981), member of the 2012 US Olympic Team for the women's 5000m competition
- Jason Knapp (born 1990, class of 2008), professional baseball pitcher in the Texas Rangers organization
- Stephen Kovacs (1972–2022), saber fencer and fencing coach, charged with sexual assault, died in prison
- Leonard Lance (born 1952), served in the U.S. House of Representatives and served in both the New Jersey Senate and New Jersey Assembly
- Anne Marie Letko (born 1969), runner who competed in the Summer Olympic games in 1996 (10th place in marathon) and 2000 (5000m)
- Kyp Malone (born 1973, class of 1991), multi-instrumentalist and member of the band TV on the Radio
- Matt McDonald (born 1993, class of 2011), distance runner
- Peter Ostrum (born 1957), actor who played the character Charlie Bucket in Willy Wonka & the Chocolate Factory
- Sidney Rivera (born 1993), professional soccer player
- Sarah Schneider, (born 1983, class of 2001), actor and writer for internet and television comedies, including CollegeHumor, The Other Two, Saturday Night Live and Master of None
- Dave Smigelsky (born 1959), former American football punter who played for the Atlanta Falcons of the National Football League and Washington Federals of the United States Football League
- The Happy Fits (classes of 2015 and 2016), indie rock band
- James Valenti (born 1977), tenor
- Sharon Van Etten (born 1981), singer-songwriter
- Gary Vaynerchuk (born 1975, class of 1994), entrepreneur, author and digital media expert
- Jessica Vosk (born 1983, class of 2002), Broadway actress who has starred as Elphaba on Broadway and in the Second National Tour of Wicked

== See also ==
- Voorhees High School, which serves students from Glen Gardner Borough, Lebanon Township, Tewksbury Township, High Bridge Borough, Califon Borough, and Hampton Borough.
- List of high school football rivalries
