= Voorhees High School =

High school in Hunterdon County, New Jersey, US

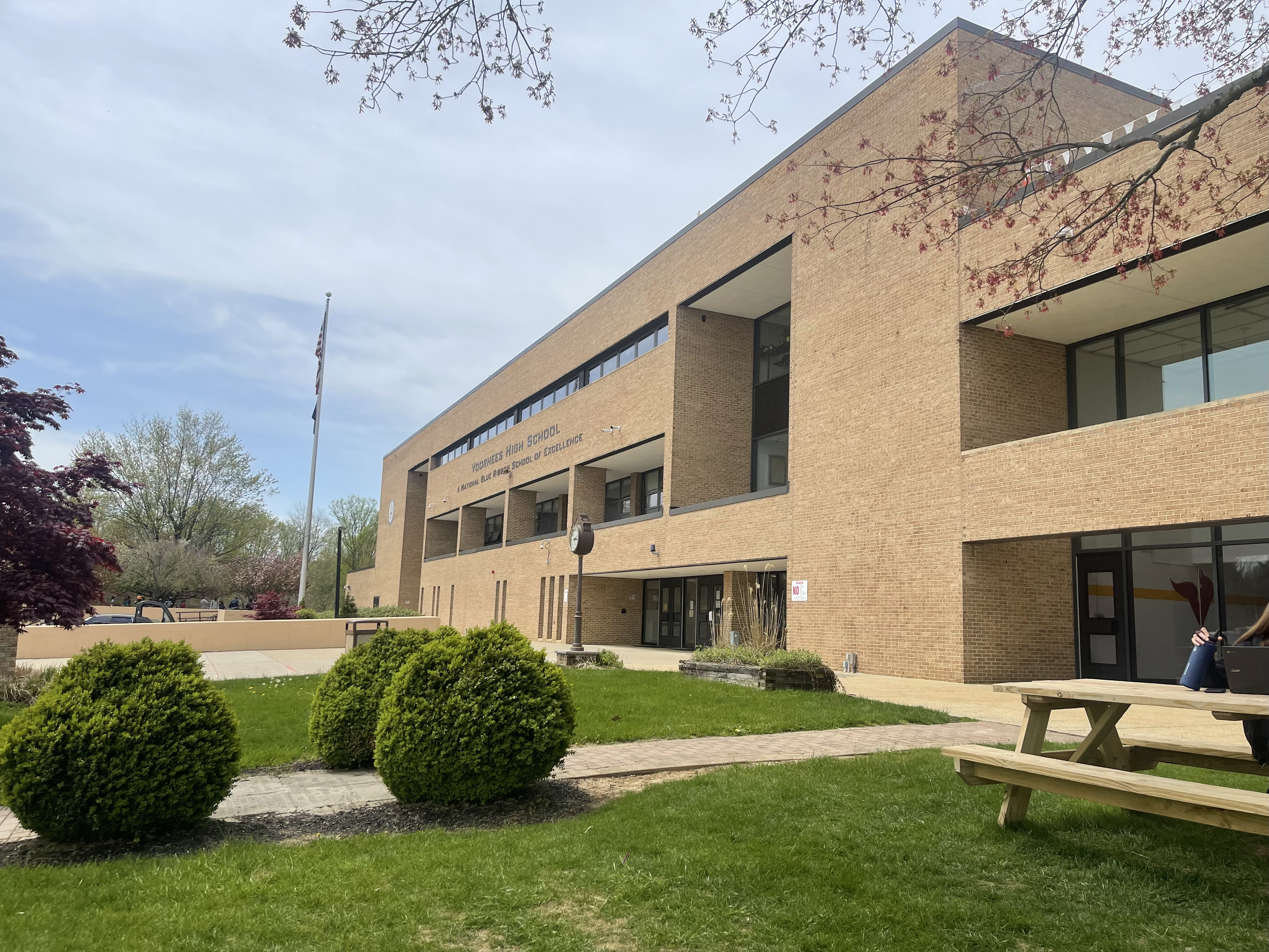

Location
- 256 High Bridge-Califon Road; Glen Gardner (postal address), Hunterdon County, New Jersey 08826; United States
- 40.696585°N 74.886744°W

Information
- Type: Public high school
- Established: 1975
- School district: North Hunterdon-Voorhees Regional High School District
- NCES School ID: 341161003026
- Principal: Ron Peterson
- Faculty: 73.9 FTEs
- Grades: 9-12
- Enrollment: 733 (as of 2024–25)
- Student to teacher ratio: 9.92:1
- Colors: Cardinal and gold
- Athletics conference: Skyland Conference (general); Big Central Football Conference (football)
- Team name: Vikings
- Rival: North Hunterdon High School
- Accreditation: Middle States Association of Colleges and Schools
- Website: www.nhvweb.net/vhs/

Voorhees High School is a four-year public high school located in Lebanon Township, named for Foster McGowan Voorhees, the 30th governor of New Jersey. It is one of two high schools in the North Hunterdon-Voorhees Regional High School District, serving students in ninth through twelfth grades from seven municipalities in northern Hunterdon County, in the U.S. state of New Jersey. The school is accredited until July 2026 and has been accredited by the Middle States Association of Colleges and Schools Commission on Elementary and Secondary Schools since 1977.

Students come from the constituent municipalities of Califon, Hampton, High Bridge, Lebanon Township and Tewksbury Township. Clinton Town and Glen Gardner residents can select either North Hunterdon or Voorhees High.

As of the 2024–25 school year, the school had an enrollment of 733 students and 73.9 classroom teachers (on an FTE basis), for a student–teacher ratio of 9.92:1. There were 25 students (3.4% of enrollment) eligible for free lunch and 15 (2% of students) eligible for reduced-cost lunch.

== History ==
Voorhees High School, constructed at a cost of $7.5 million (equivalent to $44.9 million in 2025), opened for the 1975-76 school year, helping end overcrowding that necessitated split sessions at North Hunterdon High School. Students in the following areas, except for incoming 12th graders (seniors), were reassigned to Vorhees High: Lebanon Township, Califon, High Bridge, and Tewksbury Township.

The 40-acre (16 ha) lot reserved for Voorhees High School was unusually long and narrow, which posed an engineering and design challenge. To solve this, Breslin Ridyard Fadero Architects designed the 280,000 square feet (26,000 m^{2}) school building to be nearly 700 feet (210 m) in length and three stories tall.

In 1980, a 60,000-square-foot (5,600 m^{2}) addition was built, adding a second gymnasium and cafeteria, technology laboratories, and additional classrooms to all three floors.

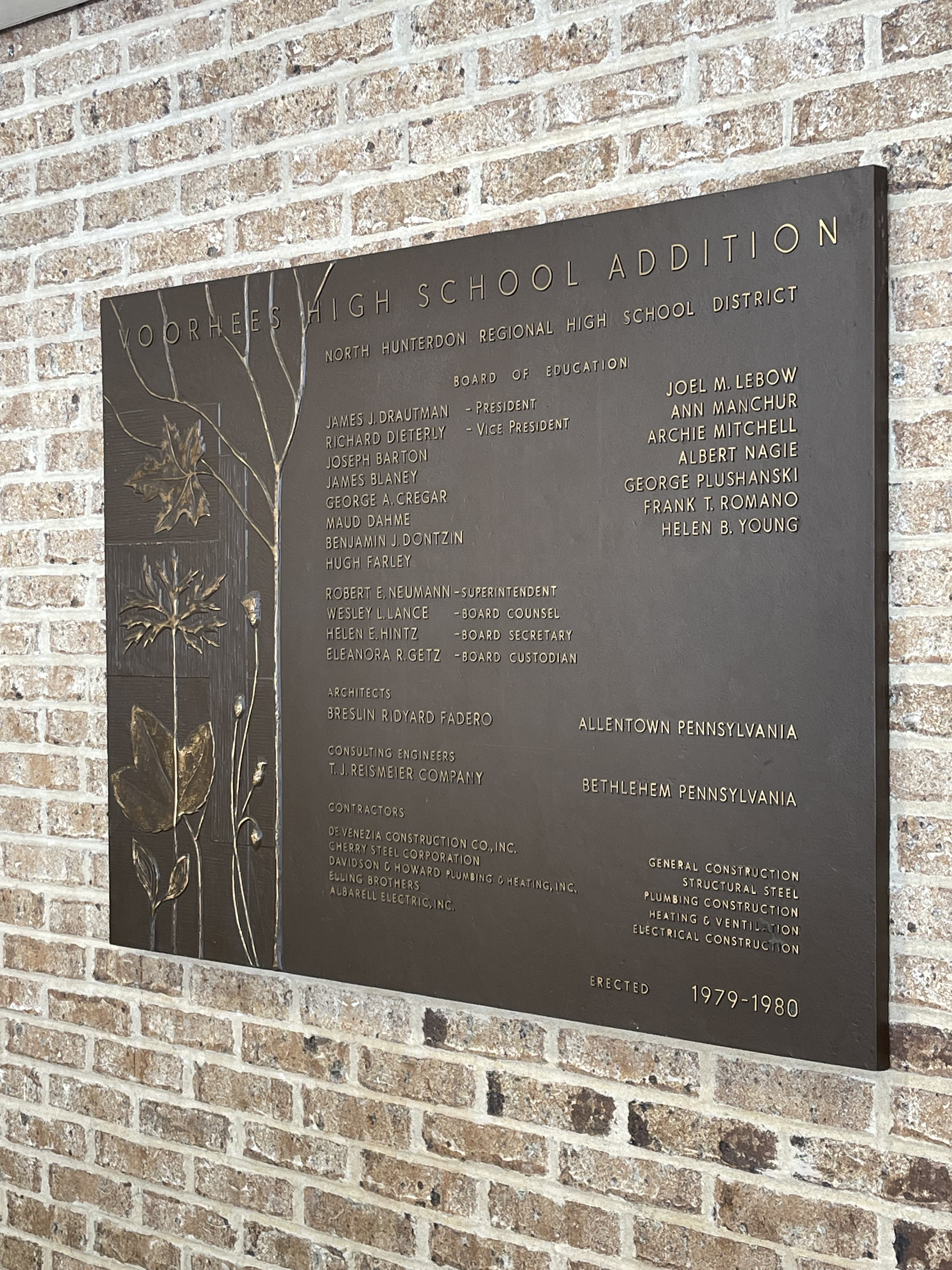
Plaque commemorating the 1979-1980 addition to Voorhees High School.

Throughout the 2021-22 school year, the North Hunterdon-Voorhees High School District undertook a large solar power installation project, which was completed in November 2022. Voorhees High School's photovoltaic system totals 655.2 kilowatts.

Glen Gardner students were zoned only to Voorhees High until 2014 after which Clinton and Glen Gardner residents were given the option to select which high school they wished to attend.

== Awards, recognition and rankings ==
In 2015, Voorhees High School was one of 15 schools in New Jersey, and one of nine public schools, recognized as a National Blue Ribbon School in the exemplary high performing category by the United States Department of Education.

In its listing of "America's Best High Schools 2016", the school was ranked 233rd out of 500 best high schools in the country; it was ranked 38th among all high schools in New Jersey and 21st among the state's non-magnet schools.

In the 2011 "Ranking America's High Schools" issue by The Washington Post, the school was ranked 24th in New Jersey and 830th nationwide. In Newsweek's May 22, 2007, issue, ranking the country's top high schools, Voorhees High School was listed in 1118th place, the 36th-highest ranked school in New Jersey.

The school was the 43rd-ranked public high school in New Jersey out of 339 schools statewide in New Jersey Monthly magazine's September 2014 cover story on the state's "Top Public High Schools", using a new ranking methodology. The school had been ranked 48th in the state of 328 schools in 2012, after being ranked 59th in 2010 out of 322 schools listed. The magazine ranked the school 41st in 2008 out of 316 schools. The school was ranked 30th in the magazine's September 2006 issue, which included 316 schools across the state.

Schooldigger.com ranked the school tied for 83rd out of 381 public high schools statewide in its 2011 rankings (a decrease of 40 positions from the 2010 ranking) which were based on the combined percentage of students classified as proficient or above proficient on the mathematics (88.1%) and language arts literacy (97.0%) components of the High School Proficiency Assessment (HSPA).

The school was the Consumer Bowl 2006 and 2007 state champion, a program that evaluates the skills of students as informed consumers.

The architects of Voorhees High School, Breslin Ridyard Fadero Architects, achieved a design award, "Outstanding Planning and Design", from the New Jersey Department of Education. Additionally, in the Annual State School of the Year awards program, Voorhees High School was judged best high school because of "The simplified form of the building, restrained use of materials and color, precision detailing, the play of sun and shadow and the wonderful site and setting."

== Athletics ==
Voorhees High School Vikings compete in the Skyland Conference, which is comprised of public and private high schools in Hunterdon, Somerset and Warren counties in west central New Jersey. The conference operates under the jurisdiction of the New Jersey State Interscholastic Athletic Association (NJSIAA). With 761 students in grades 10-12, the school was classified by the NJSIAA for the 2019–20 school year as Group III for most athletic competition purposes, which included schools with an enrollment of 761 to 1,058 students in that grade range. The football team competes in Division 2A of the Big Central Football Conference, which includes 60 public and private high schools in Hunterdon, Middlesex, Somerset, Union and Warren counties, which are broken down into 10 divisions by size and location. The school was classified by the NJSIAA as Group II South for football for 2024–2026, which included schools with 514 to 685 students.

The district approved a plan in 2010 for construction of an $850,000 artificial turf field to be mainly be used for football. Voorhees' football team was unable to use its grass field between 2008 and 2009 when glass shards and other debris was found in the turf.

The boys' wrestling team won the Central Jersey Group II state sectional championship in 1981–1983, 1995, 1996 and 1998; the Central Jersey Group III title in 1983, 1985-1989 and 1991; the North Jersey II Group II title in 2004 and 2013; and the North Jersey II Group III title in 2015 and 2018. The team won the state Group II title in 1982 and 1995, and the Group III title in 1985 and 1987. The program's 15 sectional titles are the seventh-most of any public high school in the state. The team won the program's fourth state title and finished the season with an 18-1 record after winning the Group II championship 40-21 against Buena Regional High School.

The boys' cross country team won the Group II state championship in 1981-1983, 2015 and 2016. The team won the 2015 Group II state championship, the team's first state title since 1983.

The 1984 softball team won the Group III state championship in 1984, defeating Ramsey High School by a score of 3-0 on a three-run home run in the fourth inning of the tournament final at Mercer County Park. NJ.com / The Star-Ledger ranked Voorhees as their number-one softball team in the state in 1984. The team won the 1998 Central Jersey Group II state sectional championship, defeating Raritan High School by a score of 1–0 in the first round and Manasquan High School by 4–1 in the semifinals, before defeating Carteret High School by a score of 8–2 in the tournament final. They lost 1–0 to a nationally ranked Audubon High School team in extra innings on a controversial call at the plate to end their playoff run in the Group II championship.

The field hockey team won the Central Jersey Group II state sectional championship in 1993 and 1996, won the North II Group II title in 1999, 2000, 2002 and 2016, and won the North II Group II title in 2006. The field hockey team won the 2002 North II, Group II sectional championship, edging Madison High School 3–2 in the final game. The 2006 team won the North II, Group III tournament with a 1–0 win over Ocean Township High School.

The 1995 Voorhees football team won the Central Jersey Group II state championship. Voorhees High School's football team competes in an annual Milk Can Game against rival North Hunterdon High School. After the conclusion of the game, a golden milk can is awarded to the winner, which earns bragging rights and ownership of the can until the next year's game. The 36th annual Milk Can Game was played in November 2011, with Voorhees winning at home by a score of 13–7 to end a five-year streak by North Hunterdon. With a 14–7 win in 2018, North Hunterdon had won seven consecutive games in the series and holds an overall record of 30–12–1 in the 43 Milk Can games played between the two schools. NJ.com called the Milk Can "maybe the most famous trophy in New Jersey football" and listed the rivalry in the fifth spot on their 2007 list "Ranking the 31 fiercest rivalries in N.J. HS football".

The girls cross country team won the Group III state title in 2000, 2003, 2004 and 2006-2009, and won the Group II championship 2010, 2012, 2014 and 2017. The team's 10 group titles are the fourth-most of any school in the state. The girls cross country team won the Meet of Champions in 1990, 2007, 2008 and 2012; the program's four state team titles are tied for third-most in the state.

The girls track team won the Group III winter / indoor track state title in 2001 and 2012.

The girls' track team won the Group II indoor relay championship in 2001.

The girls' basketball team won the 2000 Central, Group II title over Delaware Valley Regional High School, 62–42.

The boys fencing team won the overall state championship in 1986, 1994 and 2005. The team won in 2005 when they defeated Ramapo High School 14–13 in the tournament final.

The girls fencing team won the overall state championship in 1996 and was épée team winner in 2004 and 2010.

== Administration ==
The school's principal is Ron Peterson. His core administration team includes four assistant principals.

== Notable alumni ==
- Thomas Zander Bleck, (born 1985, class of 2003), recording artist, vocalist and songwriter
- Lee Getz (born 1964), former American football guard who played for the Kansas City Chiefs in the National Football League
- Alison Haislip (born 1981, class of 1999), actress and TV correspondent
- Brett Jungblut (born 1979, class of 1997), poker player, won the World Championship Omaha Hi/Lo event in 2004 at the World Series of Poker
- Doug Payne (born 1981, class of 2000), American equestrian who was selected to compete for the United States in the delayed 2020 Summer Games in Tokyo
- Noah Rothman (born 1981, class of 2000), editor, political commentator and author who serves as the online editor of Commentary
- Michele Smith (born 1967, class of 1985), two-time Olympic Softball Gold Medalist with the U.S. National Team, having played in the 1996 and 2000 Summer Olympics
- John P. Thornton (born 1984), business executive who is CEO of Astrobotic Technology

== See also ==
- North Hunterdon High School, which serves Clinton Town, Clinton Township, Bethlehem Township, Franklin Township, Union Township, and Lebanon Borough
- List of high school football rivalries (less than 100 years old)
