= Clinton Township, New Jersey =

Township in Hunterdon County, New Jersey, US

- Township
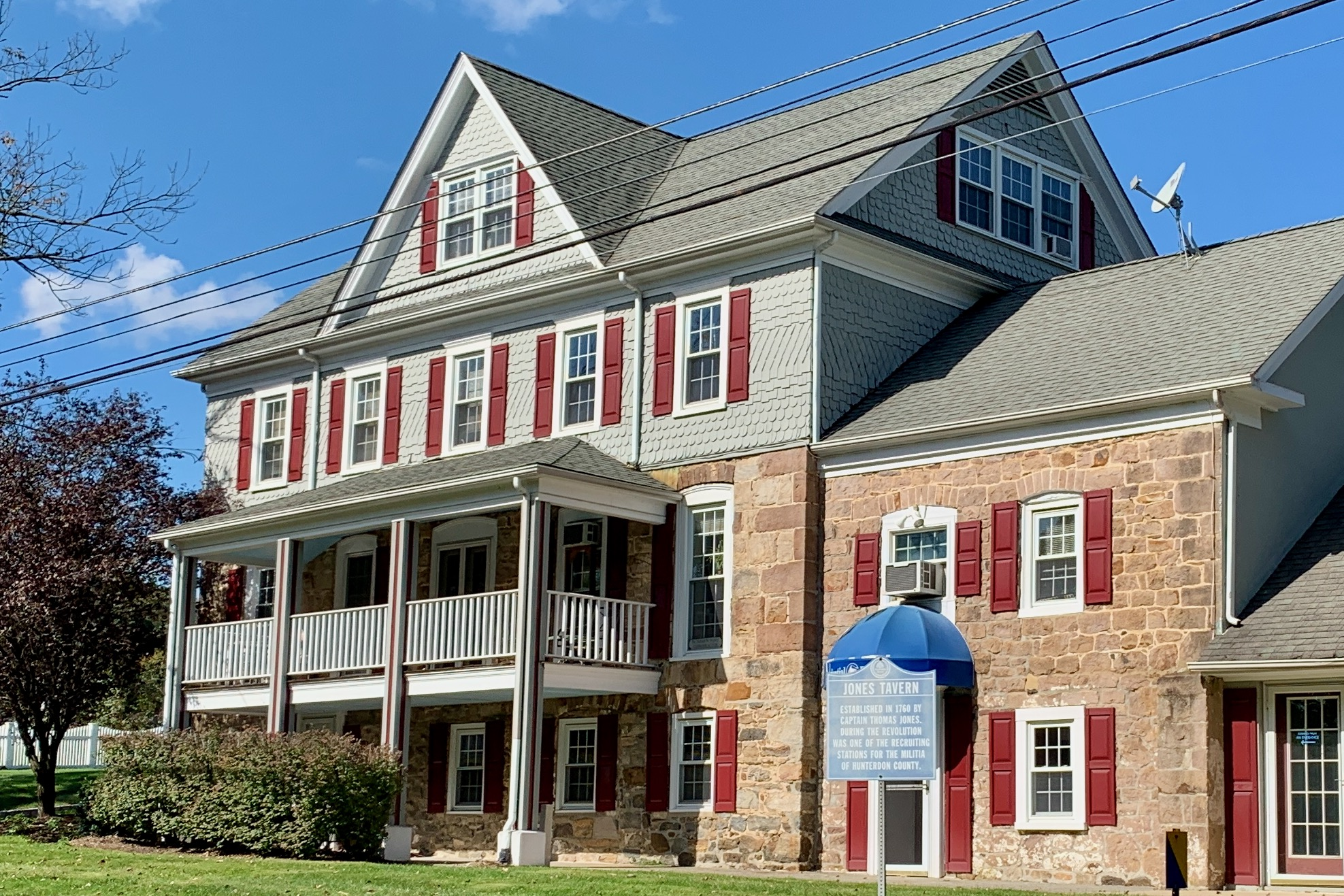
- Jones Tavern near Annandale

- Seal

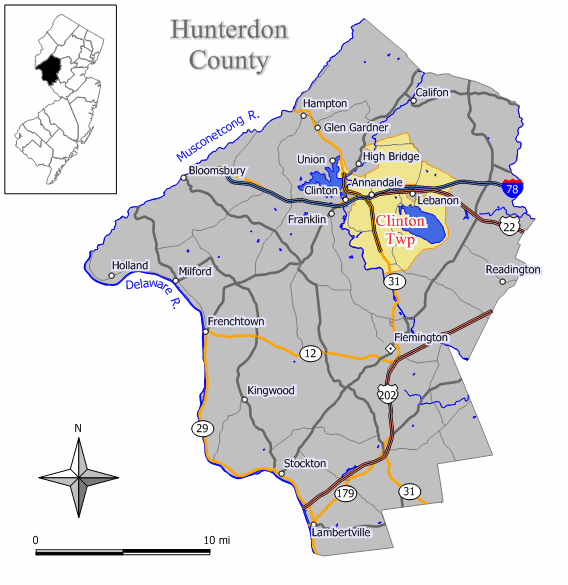
- Location of Clinton Township in Hunterdon County highlighted in yellow (right). Inset map: Location of Hunterdon County in New Jersey highlighted in black (left).

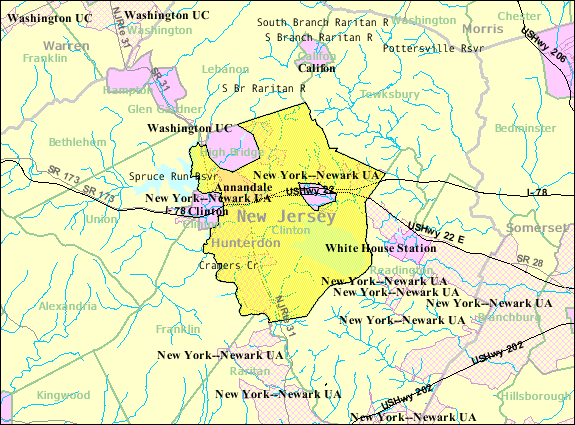
- Census Bureau map of Clinton Township, New Jersey

- Location in Hunterdon County Location in New Jersey Location in the United States
- Coordinates: 40.630098°N 74.867202°W
- Country: United States
- State: New Jersey
- County: Hunterdon
- Incorporated: April 12, 1841
- Named after: DeWitt Clinton

Government
  - Type: Faulkner Act (small municipality)
  - Body: Township Council
  - Mayor: Brian Mullay (R, term ends December 31, 2026)
  - Administrator: William Close
  - Municipal clerk: Carla Conner

Area
  - Total: 33.87 sq mi (87.72 km^{2})
  - Land: 29.87 sq mi (77.36 km^{2})
  - Water: 4.00 sq mi (10.36 km^{2}) 11.81%
  - Rank: 72nd of 565 in state 5th of 26 in county
- Elevation: 518 ft (158 m)

Population (2020)
  - Total: 13,505
  - Estimate (2023): 13,137
  - Rank: 191st of 565 in state 3rd of 26 in county
  - Density: 452.1/sq mi (174.6/km^{2})
  - Rank: 446th of 565 in state 14th of 26 in county
- Time zone: UTC−05:00 (Eastern (EST))
  - Summer (DST): UTC−04:00 (Eastern (EDT))
- ZIP Code: 08809 – Clinton; 08801 – Annandale; 08833 – Lebanon
- Area code: 908
- FIPS code: 3401913750
- GNIS feature ID: 0882177
- Website: clintontwpnj.gov

Clinton Township is a township in Hunterdon County, in the U.S. state of New Jersey. As of the 2020 United States census, the township's population was 13,505, an increase of 27 (+0.2%) from the 2010 census count of 13,478, which in turn reflected an increase of 521 (+4.0%) from the 12,957 counted in the 2000 census.

== History ==
Clinton Township was incorporated as a township by an act of the New Jersey Legislature on April 12, 1841, from portions of Lebanon Township, based on the results of a referendum held that same day. Portions of the township have been taken to form Clinton town (April 5, 1865, within the township; became independent in 1895), High Bridge township (March 29, 1871) and Lebanon borough (March 26, 1926). The township was named for Governor of New York DeWitt Clinton.

In 1998, Republican Assemblyman Michael Patrick Carroll proposed to honor former president Ronald Reagan by changing the township's name to Reagan Township and renaming Clinton to Reagan, New Jersey.

== Geography ==
According to the United States Census Bureau, the township had a total area of 33.87 square miles (87.72 km^{2}), including 29.87 square miles (77.36 km^{2}) of land and 4.00 square miles (10.36 km^{2}) of water (11.81%).

Annandale (with a 2020 Census population of 1,663) is a census-designated place and unincorporated community located within Clinton Township.

Other unincorporated communities, localities and place names located partially or completely within the township include Allerton, Cedar Heights, Cokesbury, Hamden, Mariannes Corner, McPherson, Potterstown, Readingsburg, and Sunnyside.

The township borders Clinton Town, Franklin Township, High Bridge, Lebanon Township, Raritan Township, Readington Township, Tewksbury Township, Union Township. Also, Lebanon is an independent municipality surrounded entirely by the township, making it part one of 21 pairs of "doughnut towns" in the state, where one municipality entirely surrounds another.

Cushetunk Mountain is a ring-shaped mountain located in Readington Township and Clinton Township. Once an active volcano, the diabase mountain was formed 160 million years ago. The Lenape called the mountain "Cushetunk" meaning "place of hogs". In the 1960s, the valley was filled with water to create Round Valley Reservoir, at 180 feet (55 m) in depth the second-deepest in the state.

== Demographics ==
Historical population
Census	Pop.	Note	%±
1850	2,369		—
1860	2,951		24.6%
1870	3,134	*	6.2%
1880	2,133	*	−31.9%
1890	913		−57.2%
1900	2,296		151.5%
1910	2,108		−8.2%
1920	1,987		−5.7%
1930	1,856	*	−6.6%
1940	2,349		26.6%
1950	2,926		24.6%
1960	3,770		28.8%
1970	5,119		35.8%
1980	7,345		43.5%
1990	10,816		47.3%
2000	12,957		19.8%
2010	13,478		4.0%
2020	13,505		0.2%
2023 (est.)	13,137		−2.7%
Population sources:1850–1920 1880–1890 1890–1910; 1910–1930 1940–2000; 2000 2010 2020 * = Lost territory in previous decade.

=== 2010 census ===
The 2010 United States census counted 13,478 people, 4,568 households, and 3,444 families in the township. The population density was 451.1 per square mile (174.2/km^{2}). There were 4,737 housing units at an average density of 158.6 per square mile (61.2/km^{2}). The racial makeup was 86.43% (11,649) White, 6.01% (810) Black or African American, 0.20% (27) Native American, 3.90% (525) Asian, 0.04% (6) Pacific Islander, 1.79% (241) from other races, and 1.63% (220) from two or more races. Hispanic or Latino of any race were 5.60% (755) of the population.

Of the 4,568 households, 36.6% had children under the age of 18; 67.3% were married couples living together; 5.6% had a female householder with no husband present and 24.6% were non-families. Of all households, 20.6% were made up of individuals and 6.4% had someone living alone who was 65 years of age or older. The average household size was 2.68 and the average family size was 3.14.

24.1% of the population were under the age of 18, 12.0% from 18 to 24, 20.3% from 25 to 44, 33.0% from 45 to 64, and 10.7% who were 65 years of age or older. The median age was 40.9 years. For every 100 females, the population had 116.2 males. For every 100 females ages 18 and older there were 121.3 males.

The Census Bureau's 2006–2010 American Community Survey showed that (in 2010 inflation-adjusted dollars) median household income was $120,565 (with a margin of error of +/− $6,904) and the median family income was $147,689 (+/− $10,532). Males had a median income of $106,898 (+/− $7,766) versus $73,264 (+/− $11,810) for females. The per capita income for the borough was $52,700 (+/− $6,064). About 1.7% of families and 2.3% of the population were below the poverty line, including 3.7% of those under age 18 and 2.0% of those age 65 or over.

=== 2000 census ===
As of the 2000 United States census there were 12,957 people, 4,129 households, and 3,253 families residing in the township. The population density was 431.9 inhabitants per square mile (166.8/km^{2}). There were 4,234 housing units at an average density of 141.1 per square mile (54.5/km^{2}). The racial makeup of the township was 87.71% White, 6.96% African American, 0.20% Native American, 2.35% Asian, 0.07% Pacific Islander, 1.59% from other races, and 1.12% from two or more races. Hispanic or Latino of any race were 3.91% of the population.

There were 4,129 households, out of which 42.1% had children under the age of 18 living with them, 73.1% were married couples living together, 4.1% had a female householder with no husband present, and 21.2% were non-families. 17.4% of all households were made up of individuals, and 5.1% had someone living alone who was 65 years of age or older. The average household size was 2.82 and the average family size was 3.23.

In the township the population was spread out, with 26.2% under the age of 18, 11.1% from 18 to 24, 28.8% from 25 to 44, 26.5% from 45 to 64, and 7.3% who were 65 years of age or older. The median age was 36 years. For every 100 females, there were 118.4 males. For every 100 females age 18 and over, there were 124.8 males.

The median income for a household in the township was $96,570, and the median income for a family was $106,448. Males had a median income of $77,229 versus $46,762 for females. The per capita income for the township was $37,264. About 0.3% of families and 0.9% of the population were below the poverty line, including none of those under age 18 and 3.6% of those age 65 or over.

== Parks and recreation ==
Clinton Township hosts part of a rail trail that was created out of the former Central Railroad of New Jersey High Bridge Branch. The trail is maintained by Hunterdon County Parks and Recreation and is called the Columbia Trail, which includes a scenic area known as the Ken Lockwood Gorge.

== Government ==
=== Local government ===
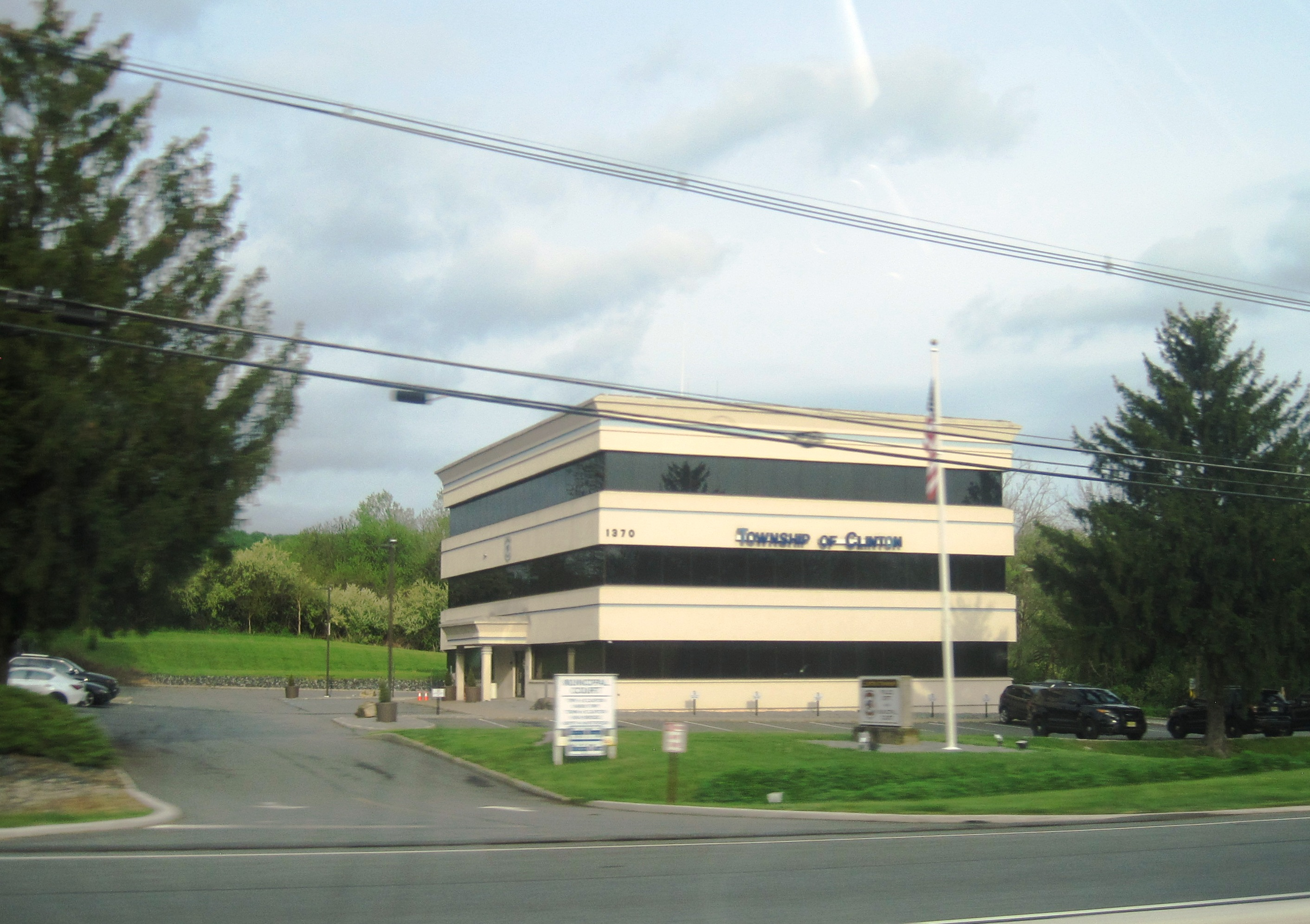
Clinton Muncipial Building

Clinton Township is governed within the Faulkner Act, formally known as the Optional Municipal Charter Law, under the Small Municipality form of government. The township is one of 18 municipalities (of the 564) statewide that use this form of government, which is available as an option only for municipalities with a population of under 12,000 at the time of adoption. The government is comprised of the mayor and the four-member township council, with all positions elected at-large on a partisan basis as part of the November general elections. A mayor is elected directly by the voters to a three-year term of office. Council members serve a term of three years, which are staggered so that two council seats come up for election each year that the mayor's seat does not come up for vote.

The mayor is the township's executive official and is responsible for selecting the Municipal Clerk and Assessor, which are subject to confirmation by the township council. The council is the township's legislative body and is responsible for ordinances, resolutions and the annual budget, as well as most hiring other than those positions delegated to the mayor. The mayor presides over and is eligible to vote at council meetings, but has no veto power.

As of 2023, the Clinton Township Council consists of Mayor Brian Mullay (R, term ends December 31, 2023), Council President Marc H. Strauss (R, 2024), William A. Glaser Jr. (R, 2025), Thomas Kochanowski (R, 2024) and Amy Switlyk (R, 2025).

In January 2021, the township council selected Bill Glaser from a list of three candidates submitted by the Republican municipal committee to fill the council seat expiring in December 2022 that became vacant when Brian Mullay took office as mayor. Glaser served on an interim basis until the November 2021 general election, when he was chosen to serve the balance of the term of office.

=== Federal, state and county representation ===
Clinton Township is located in the 7th Congressional District and is part of New Jersey's 16th state legislative district.

For the 119th United States Congress, New Jersey's 7th congressional district is represented by Thomas Kean Jr. (R, Westfield). New Jersey is represented in the United States Senate by Democrats Cory Booker (Newark, term ends 2027) and Andy Kim (Moorestown, term ends 2031).

For the 2026–2027 session, the 16th legislative district of the New Jersey Legislature is represented in the New Jersey Senate by Andrew Zwicker (D, South Brunswick) and in the General Assembly by Mitchelle Drulis (D, East Amwell Township) and Roy Freiman (D, Hillsborough Township).

Hunterdon County is governed by a Board of County Commissioners comprised of five members who are elected at-large on a partisan basis to serve three-year terms of office on a staggered basis, with either one or two seats up for election each year as part of the November general election. At an annual reorganization meeting held each January, the commissioners select one member to serve as the board's Director and another to serve as Deputy Director, each for a one-year term. As of 2025, Hunterdon County's Commissioners are Director John E. Lanza (R; Raritan Township, 2025), Deputy Director Shaun C. Van Doren (R; Tewksbury Township, 2026), Jeff Kuhl (R; Raritan Township, 2027), Zachary T. Rich (R; West Amwell Township, 2025) and Susan Soloway (R; Franklin Township, 2027).

Constitutional officers elected on a countywide basis are Clerk Mary H. Melfi (R; Flemington, 2026), Sheriff Fredrick W. Brown (R; Alexandria Township, 2025) and Surrogate Heidi Rohrbach (R; Lebanon Township, 2028).

=== Politics ===
As of March 2011, there were a total of 8,817 registered voters in Clinton Township, of which 1,433 (16.3%) were registered as Democrats, 3,861 (43.8%) were registered as Republicans and 3,517 (39.9%) were registered as Unaffiliated. There were 6 voters registered as Libertarians or Greens.

Gubernatorial election results for Clinton Township
Year	Republican		Democratic		Third party(ies)	
Year	No.	%	No.	%	No.	%
2025	3,443	52.37%	3,082	46.88%	49	0.75%
2021	3,327	59.27%	2,240	39.91%	46	0.82%
2017	2,828	61.57%	1,677	36.51%	88	1.92%
2013	3,195	76.38%	899	21.49%	89	2.13%
2009	3,662	71.23%	1,058	20.58%	421	8.19%
2005	2,995	66.54%	1,298	28.84%	208	4.62%

In the 2012 presidential election, Republican Mitt Romney received 61.1% of the vote (4,265 cast), ahead of Democrat Barack Obama with 37.6% (2,628 votes), and other candidates with 1.3% (90 votes), among the 7,023 ballots cast by the township's 9,298 registered voters (40 ballots were spoiled), for a turnout of 75.5%. In the 2008 presidential election, Republican John McCain received 58.7% of the vote (4,279 cast), ahead of Democrat Barack Obama with 39.2% (2,859 votes) and other candidates with 1.3% (98 votes), among the 7,289 ballots cast by the township's 8,975 registered voters, for a turnout of 81.2%. In the 2004 presidential election, Republican George W. Bush received 64.0% of the vote (4,389 ballots cast), outpolling Democrat John Kerry with 34.1% (2,340 votes) and other candidates with 0.7% (60 votes), among the 6,863 ballots cast by the township's 8,143 registered voters, for a turnout percentage of 84.3.

United States presidential election results for Clinton Township
Year	Republican		Democratic		Third party(ies)	
Year	No.	%	No.	%	No.	%
2024	3,991	51.18%	3,667	47.02%	140	1.80%
2020	4,326	49.95%	4,148	47.90%	186	2.15%
2016	3,993	54.33%	3,008	40.93%	348	4.74%
2012	4,265	61.08%	2,628	37.63%	90	1.29%
2008	4,279	59.13%	2,859	39.51%	98	1.35%
2004	4,389	64.65%	2,340	34.47%	60	0.88%

In the 2013 gubernatorial election, Republican Chris Christie received 76.4% of the vote (3,195 cast), ahead of Democrat Barbara Buono with 21.5% (899 votes), and other candidates with 2.1% (89 votes), among the 4,261 ballots cast by the township's 9,144 registered voters (78 ballots were spoiled), for a turnout of 46.6%. In the 2009 gubernatorial election, Republican Chris Christie received 70.5% of the vote (3,662 ballots cast), ahead of Democrat Jon Corzine with 20.4% (1,058 votes), Independent Chris Daggett with 7.5% (391 votes) and other candidates with 0.6% (30 votes), among the 5,196 ballots cast by the township's 8,869 registered voters, yielding a 58.6% turnout.

United States Senate election results for Clinton Township1
Year	Republican		Democratic		Third party(ies)	
Year	No.	%	No.	%	No.	%
2024	3,879	51.71%	3,477	46.35%	146	1.95%
2018	3,918	59.23%	2,461	37.20%	236	3.57%
2012	4,064	61.26%	2,375	35.80%	195	2.94%
2006	2,811	62.47%	1,537	34.16%	152	3.38%

United States Senate election results for Clinton Township2
Year	Republican		Democratic		Third party(ies)	
Year	No.	%	No.	%	No.	%
2020	4,577	53.61%	3,783	44.31%	178	2.08%
2014	2,249	62.28%	1,287	35.64%	75	2.08%
2013	1,891	63.61%	1,059	35.62%	23	0.77%
2008	4,469	65.81%	2,099	30.91%	223	3.28%

== Education ==
The Clinton Township School District serves children in pre-kindergarten through eighth grade. As of the 2021–22 school year, the district, comprised of three schools, had an enrollment of 1,199 students and 134.6 classroom teachers (on an FTE basis), for a student–teacher ratio of 8.9:1. Schools in the district (with 2021–22 school enrollment data from the National Center for Education Statistics) are Patrick McGaheran School with 394 students in grades K-2, Round Valley School with 375 students in grades 3-5 and Clinton Township Middle School with 426 students in grades 6-8. Students in grades 7 and 8 from Lebanon Borough attend the district's middle school as part of a sending/receiving relationship with the Lebanon Borough School District.

Public school students in ninth through twelfth grades attend North Hunterdon High School in Annandale, which also serves students from Bethlehem Township, Clinton Town, Franklin Township, Lebanon Borough and Union Township. As of the 2021–22 school year, the high school had an enrollment of 1,358 students and 119.0 classroom teachers (on an FTE basis), for a student–teacher ratio of 11.4:1. The school is part of the North Hunterdon-Voorhees Regional High School District, which also includes students from Califon, Glen Gardner, Hampton, High Bridge, Lebanon Township and Tewksbury Township, who attend Voorhees High School in Lebanon Township.

Eighth grade students from all of Hunterdon County are eligible to apply to attend the high school programs offered by the Hunterdon County Vocational School District, a county-wide vocational school district that offers career and technical education at its campuses in Raritan Township and at programs sited at local high schools, with no tuition charged to students for attendance.

Immaculate Conception School, located in Annandale and serving students in pre-kindergarten through eighth grade, operates under the supervision of the Roman Catholic Diocese of Metuchen. In September 2013, the school was one of 15 in New Jersey to be recognized by the United States Department of Education as part of the National Blue Ribbon Schools Program, an award called the "most prestigious honor in the United States' education system" and which Education Secretary Arne Duncan described as schools that "represent examples of educational excellence".

== Transportation ==
=== Roads and highways ===
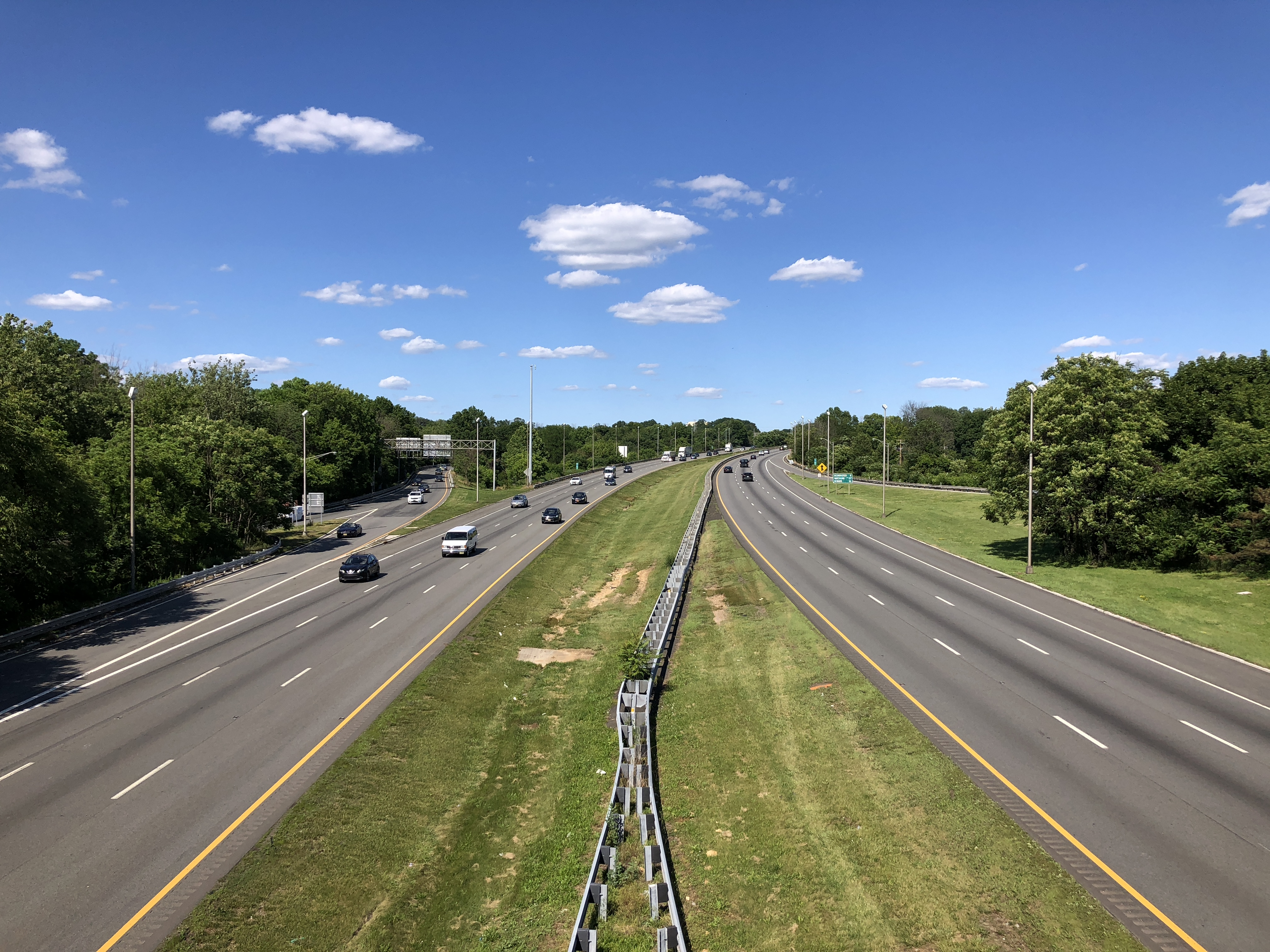
Interstate 78 eastbound at its interchange with Route 22 in Clinton Township

As of May 2010, the township had a total of 119.00 miles (191.51 km) of roadways, of which 86.79 miles (139.67 km) were maintained by the municipality, 17.20 miles (27.68 km) by Hunterdon County and 15.01 miles (24.16 km) by the New Jersey Department of Transportation.

Several roadways pass through Clinton Township. These include Interstate 78, Route 22 and Route 31.

=== Rail and bus transportation ===
Annandale is an NJ Transit railroad station on the Raritan Valley Line, in the Annandale section of Clinton Township. There is a station building that is no longer used and there are two small shelters. This station has limited weekday service and no weekend service. NJ Transit offers bus service on the 884 route.

The Norfolk Southern Railway's Lehigh Line (formerly the mainline of the Lehigh Valley Railroad), runs through the southwest part of Clinton Township.

== Notable people ==
People who were born in, residents of, or otherwise closely associated with Clinton Township include:

- Walter Chandoha (1920–2019), animal photographer, known for his 90,000 photographs of cats
- Stephen DiLauro, playwright and ukulele player
- John B. Evans (1942–2004), media executive and publisher of The Village Voice
- Jason Knapp (born 1990), professional baseball pitcher
- Leonard Lance (born 1952), former member of the United States House of Representatives
- John Manners (1786–1853), physician, lawyer, and politician who served as President of the New Jersey Senate
- Matt McDonald (born 1993), distance runner who specializes in the marathon and has placed in the top 25 in seven World Marathon Majors
- Josh Melnick (born 1995), professional ice hockey player who played for the Straubing Tigers of the Deutsche Eishockey Liga

== Surrounding communities ==
The township completely surrounds the borough of Lebanon.
