= Clinton Township School District =

School district in Hunterdon County, New Jersey, US

Address
- 128 Cokesbury Road Clinton Township, Hunterdon County, New Jersey, 08833; United States
- Coordinates: 40.653701°N 74.830245°W

District information
- Grades: PreK-8
- Superintendent: Melissa Stager
- Business administrator: Gretchen Dempsey
- Schools: 3

Students and staff
- Enrollment: 1,199 (as of 2021–22)
- Faculty: 134.6 FTEs
- Student–teacher ratio: 8.9:1

Other information
- District Factor Group: I
- Website: www.ctsdnj.org
Ind.	Per pupil	District spending	Rank (*)	K-8 average	%± vs. average
1A	Total Spending	$19,276	73	$18,891	2.0%
1	Budgetary Cost	14,995	62	14,159	5.9%
2	Classroom Instruction	8,889	55	8,659	2.7%
6	Support Services	2,904	76	2,167	34.0%
8	Administrative Cost	1,508	35	1,547	−2.5%
10	Operations & Maintenance	1,618	50	1,612	0.4%
13	Extracurricular Activities	58	14	104	−44.2%
16	Median Teacher Salary	53,892	10	61,136
Data from NJDoE 2014 Taxpayers' Guide to Education Spending. *Of K-8 districts with more than 750 students. Lowest spending=1; Highest=84

The Clinton Township School District is a comprehensive community public school district that serves children in pre-kindergarten through eighth grade in Clinton Township, in Hunterdon County, in the U.S. state of New Jersey.

As of the 2021–22 school year, the district, comprised of three schools, had an enrollment of 1,199 students and 134.6 classroom teachers (on an FTE basis), for a student–teacher ratio of 8.9:1.

The district participates in the Interdistrict Public School Choice Program, which allows non-resident students to attend school in the district at no cost to their parents, with tuition covered by the resident district. Available slots are announced annually by grade.

Public school students in ninth through twelfth grades attend North Hunterdon High School in Annandale, which also serves students from Bethlehem Township, Clinton Town, Franklin Township, Lebanon Borough and Union Township. As of the 2021–22 school year, the high school had an enrollment of 1,358 students and 119.0 classroom teachers (on an FTE basis), for a student–teacher ratio of 11.4:1. The school is part of the North Hunterdon-Voorhees Regional High School District, which also includes students from Califon, Glen Gardner, Hampton, High Bridge, Lebanon Township and Tewksbury Township, who attend Voorhees High School in Lebanon Township.

== History ==
The Clinton Township School District undertook a project to consider the possibility of withdrawing from the North Hunterdon-Voorhees Regional High School District to form an independent K-12 school district. In February 2005, the Clinton Township Board of Education commissioned a study to consider the educational and financial effects of a proposed withdrawal scenario for Clinton Township, with a report estimating that annual savings for the district could be as high as $1.2 million.

In 2018, it was announced that Clinton Township Middle School (CTMS) and Round Valley School (RVS) would be realigning grades, with CTMS switching from grades 7 and 8 to grades 6 through 8, and Round Valley now having students from grade 3 to 5, instead of 4 to 6.

The district had been classified by the New Jersey Department of Education as being in District Factor Group "I", the second-highest of eight groupings. District Factor Groups organize districts statewide, ostensibly to allow comparison by common socioeconomic characteristics of the local districts. From lowest socioeconomic status to highest, the categories are A, B, CD, DE, FG, GH, I and J.

== Schools ==
Schools in the district (with 2021–22 school enrollment data from the National Center for Education Statistics) are:

- Patrick McGaheran School with 394 students in grades K-2
  - Melissa Goad, principal
- Round Valley School with 375 students in grades 3-5
  - Mary Postma, principal
- Clinton Township Middle School with 426 students in grades 6-8. Students in grades 7 and 8 from Lebanon Borough attend the district's middle school as part of a sending/receiving relationship with the Lebanon Borough School District.
  - Luke Mason, principal

== Administration ==
Core members of the district's administration are:

- Melissa Stager, superintendent
- Gretchen Dempsey, board secretary and business administrator

== Board of education ==
The district's board of education, comprised of nine members, sets policy and oversees the fiscal and educational operation of the district through its administration. As a Type II school district, the board's trustees are elected directly by voters to serve three-year terms of office on a staggered basis, with three seats up for election each year held (since 2012) as part of the November general election. The board appoints a superintendent to oversee the district's day-to-day operations and a business administrator to supervise the business functions of the district.
