= Lebanon, New Jersey =

Borough in Hunterdon County, New Jersey, US

- Borough
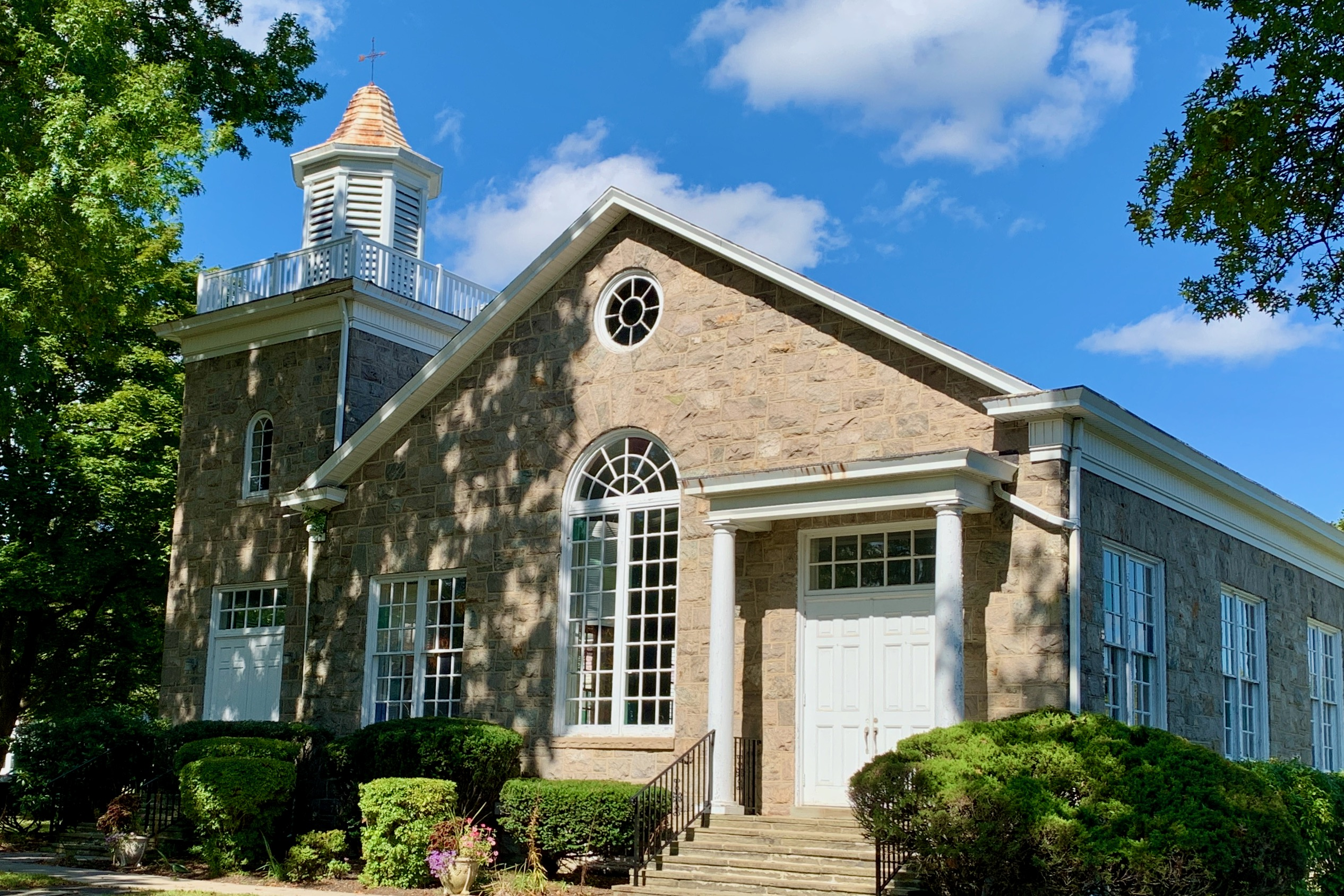
- Lebanon Reformed Church

- Seal

- Location of Lebanon in Hunterdon County highlighted in red (left). Inset map: Location of Hunterdon County in New Jersey highlighted in orange (right).

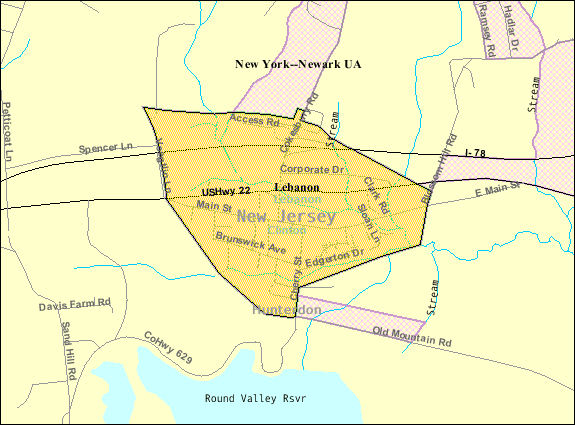
- Census Bureau map of Lebanon, New Jersey

- Location in Hunterdon County Location in New Jersey Location in the United States
- Coordinates: 40.641862°N 74.833312°W
- Country: United States
- State: New Jersey
- County: Hunterdon
- Incorporated: April 20, 1926

Government
  - Type: Borough
  - Body: Borough Council
  - Mayor: James J. Pittinger (R, term ends December 31, 2026)
  - Administrator / Municipal clerk: Karen Romano

Area
  - Total: 0.90 sq mi (2.34 km^{2})
  - Land: 0.90 sq mi (2.34 km^{2})
  - Water: 0 sq mi (0.00 km^{2}) 0.00%
  - Rank: 514th of 565 in state 25th of 26 in county
- Elevation: 246 ft (75 m)

Population (2020)
  - Total: 1,665
  - Estimate (2023): 1,670
  - Rank: 505th of 565 in state 20th of 26 in county
  - Density: 1,845.8/sq mi (712.7/km^{2})
  - Rank: 304th of 565 in state 4th of 26 in county
- Time zone: UTC−05:00 (Eastern (EST))
  - Summer (DST): UTC−04:00 (Eastern (EDT))
- ZIP Code: 08833
- Area code: 908
- FIPS code: 3401939630
- GNIS feature ID: 0885275
- Website: www.lebanonboro.com

Lebanon (pronounced "LEB-uh-nin") is a borough in Hunterdon County, in the U.S. state of New Jersey. As of the 2020 United States census, the borough's population was 1,665, the highest ever in any decennial census and an increase of 307 (+22.6%) from the 2010 census count of 1,358, which in turn reflected an increase of 293 (+27.5%) from the 1,065 counted in the 2000 census.

Lebanon was incorporated as a borough by an act of the New Jersey Legislature on March 26, 1926, from portions of Clinton Township, based on the results of a referendum held on April 20, 1926. Additional portions of Clinton Township were annexed in 1962.

The borough is located north of the Round Valley Reservoir. In the early part of the 19th century, before the separation of Clinton Township from Lebanon Township on April 12, 1841, the community was known as Jacksonville and later as Lebanonville, Lebanonville Depot and finally Lebanon, a station on the Central Railroad of New Jersey.

The center of Lebanon has changed little in the past century. The Dutch Reformed Church is one of the oldest congregations in the County. Records of the church begin in 1769, however, the church is cited as early as 1747. The Lebanon Historic District was listed on the state and national registers of historic places in 2009.

On April 5, 2024, Lebanon, Oldwick, and Tewksbury Township became epicenters of the 2024 New Jersey earthquake, a 4.8 magnitude earthquake that shook much of the Northeast United States, rare in that area.

== Geography ==
According to the United States Census Bureau, the borough had a total area of 0.90 square miles (2.34 km^{2}), almost all of which was land.

The borough is an independent municipality surrounded by Clinton Township, making it part of one of 21 pairs of "doughnut towns" in the state, where one municipality entirely surrounds another.

== Demographics ==
Historical population
Census	Pop.	Note	%±
1930	550		—
1940	638		16.0%
1950	752		17.9%
1960	880		17.0%
1970	885		0.6%
1980	820		−7.3%
1990	1,036		26.3%
2000	1,065		2.8%
2010	1,358		27.5%
2020	1,665		22.6%
2023 (est.)	1,670	▲	0.3%
Population sources: 1930 1940–2000; 2000 2010 2020

=== 2010 census ===
The 2010 United States census counted 1,358 people, 602 households, and 366 families in the borough. The population density was 1,532.0 per square mile (591.5/km^{2}). There were 664 housing units at an average density of 749.1 per square mile (289.2/km^{2}). The racial makeup was 90.13% (1,224) White, 1.77% (24) Black or African American, 0.15% (2) Native American, 5.23% (71) Asian, 0.00% (0) Pacific Islander, 0.88% (12) from other races, and 1.84% (25) from two or more races. Hispanic or Latino of any race were 5.01% (68) of the population.

Of the 602 households, 28.6% had children under the age of 18; 46.5% were married couples living together; 10.5% had a female householder with no husband present and 39.2% were non-families. Of all households, 34.2% were made up of individuals and 13.1% had someone living alone who was 65 years of age or older. The average household size was 2.26 and the average family size was 2.93.

21.1% of the population were under the age of 18, 6.4% from 18 to 24, 30.5% from 25 to 44, 28.9% from 45 to 64, and 13.2% who were 65 years of age or older. The median age was 40.2 years. For every 100 females, the population had 84.8 males. For every 100 females ages 18 and older there were 82.6 males. The Census Bureau's 2006–2010 American Community Survey showed that (in 2010 inflation-adjusted dollars) median household income was $71,629 (with a margin of error of +/− $5,410) and the median family income was $96,500 (+/− $10,275). Males had a median income of $70,977 (+/− $9,418) versus $53,750 (+/− $18,758) for females. The per capita income for the borough was $37,035 (+/− $2,975). About 1.5% of families and 2.8% of the population were below the poverty line, including 1.3% of those under age 18 and 1.8% of those age 65 or over.

=== 2000 census ===
As of the 2000 United States census there were 1,065 people, 458 households, and 287 families residing in the borough. The population density was 1,227.3 inhabitants per square mile (473.9/km^{2}). There were 477 housing units at an average density of 549.7 per square mile (212.2/km^{2}). The racial makeup of the borough was 95.40% White, 0.66% African American, 0.19% Native American, 3.10% Asian, 0.38% from other races, and 0.28% from two or more races. Hispanic or Latino of any race were 2.07% of the population.

There were 458 households, out of which 30.8% had children under the age of 18 living with them, 50.4% were married couples living together, 9.6% had a female householder with no husband present, and 37.3% were non-families. 33.0% of all households were made up of individuals, and 10.5% had someone living alone who was 65 years of age or older. The average household size was 2.33 and the average family size was 2.97.

In the borough the population was spread out, with 24.1% under the age of 18, 3.7% from 18 to 24, 35.1% from 25 to 44, 25.4% from 45 to 64, and 11.6% who were 65 years of age or older. The median age was 39 years. For every 100 females, there were 92.2 males. For every 100 females age 18 and over, there were 82.4 males.

The median income for a household in the borough was $68,542, and the median income for a family was $83,436. Males had a median income of $52,316 versus $37,396 for females. The per capita income for the borough was $34,066. About 0.7% of families and 3.6% of the population were below the poverty line, including 2.0% of those under age 18 and 5.1% of those age 65 or over.

== Government ==
=== Local government ===
Lebanon Borough is governed under the borough form of New Jersey municipal government, one of 218 municipalities (of the 564) statewide that use this form, the most common form of government in New Jersey. The governing body is comprised of the mayor and the borough council, with all positions elected at-large on a partisan basis as part of the November general election. The mayor is elected directly by the voters to a four-year term of office. The borough council includes six members elected to serve three-year terms on a staggered basis, with two seats coming up for election each year in a three-year cycle. The borough form of government used by Lebanon is a "weak mayor / strong council" government in which council members act as the legislative body with the mayor presiding at meetings and voting only in the event of a tie. The mayor can veto ordinances subject to an override by a two-thirds majority vote of the council. The mayor makes committee and liaison assignments for council members, and most appointments are made by the mayor with the advice and consent of the council.

As of 2023, the mayor of Lebanon Borough is Republican James J. Pittinger, whose term of office ends December 31, 2026. The Lebanon Borough Council is comprised of Council President Richard J. Burton (R, 2024), Samuel Berger (R, 2024), Gregory F. Crawford (R, 2025), Robert J. Kirchofer (R, 2025), James Lance (R, 2023) and Mary Basile Logan (R, 2023).

In August 2019, the borough council selected Melissa Saharic to fill the seat expiring in December 2020 that became vacant following the resignation of Michael Piagentini, who left office the previous month after announcing that he was moving out of the borough. In November 2019, Saharic was elected to serve the balance of the term of office.

After Republican incumbent Barbara "Bonnie" Schmidt and Democratic challenger Marlene Baldinger ended up tied with 431 votes for the second of two council seats in the November 2016 general election, the two faced off in a January runoff, which Baldinger won by a 183-135 margin.

=== Federal, state and county representation ===
Lebanon Borough is located in the 7th Congressional District and is part of New Jersey's 16th state legislative district.

For the 119th United States Congress, New Jersey's 7th congressional district is represented by Thomas Kean Jr. (R, Westfield). New Jersey is represented in the United States Senate by Democrats Cory Booker (Newark, term ends 2027) and Andy Kim (Moorestown, term ends 2031).

For the 2026–2027 session, the 16th legislative district of the New Jersey Legislature is represented in the New Jersey Senate by Andrew Zwicker (D, South Brunswick) and in the General Assembly by Mitchelle Drulis (D, East Amwell Township) and Roy Freiman (D, Hillsborough Township).

Hunterdon County is governed by a Board of County Commissioners comprised of five members who are elected at-large on a partisan basis to serve three-year terms of office on a staggered basis, with either one or two seats up for election each year as part of the November general election. At an annual reorganization meeting held each January, the commissioners select one member to serve as the board's Director and another to serve as Deputy Director, each for a one-year term. As of 2025, Hunterdon County's Commissioners are Director John E. Lanza (R; Raritan Township, 2025), Deputy Director Shaun C. Van Doren (R; Tewksbury Township, 2026), Jeff Kuhl (R; Raritan Township, 2027), Zachary T. Rich (R; West Amwell Township, 2025) and Susan Soloway (R; Franklin Township, 2027).

Constitutional officers elected on a countywide basis are Clerk Mary H. Melfi (R; Flemington, 2026), Sheriff Fredrick W. Brown (R; Alexandria Township, 2025) and Surrogate Heidi Rohrbach (R; Lebanon Township, 2028).

=== Politics ===
As of March 2011, there were a total of 955 registered voters in Lebanon, of which 190 (19.9%) were registered as Democrats, 374 (39.2%) were registered as Republicans and 388 (40.6%) were registered as Unaffiliated. There were three voters registered as Libertarians or Greens.

Gubernatorial election results for Lebanon
Year	Republican		Democratic		Third party(ies)	
Year	No.	%	No.	%	No.	%
2025	446	53.86%	377	45.53%	5	0.60%
2021	433	65.61%	223	33.79%	4	0.61%
2017	313	59.62%	200	38.10%	12	2.29%
2013	373	77.07%	99	20.45%	12	2.48%
2009	365	67.97%	108	20.11%	64	11.92%
2005	328	63.69%	161	31.26%	26	5.05%

In the 2012 presidential election, Republican Mitt Romney received 57.5% of the vote (471 cast), ahead of Democrat Barack Obama with 40.9% (335 votes), and other candidates with 1.6% (13 votes), among the 826 ballots cast by the borough's 1,118 registered voters (7 ballots were spoiled), for a turnout of 73.9%. In the 2008 presidential election, Republican John McCain received 56.7% of the vote (403 cast), ahead of Democrat Barack Obama with 41.4% (294 votes) and other candidates with 1.3% (9 votes), among the 711 ballots cast by the borough's 861 registered voters, for a turnout of 82.6%. In the 2004 presidential election, Republican George W. Bush received 63.0% of the vote (410 ballots cast), outpolling Democrat John Kerry with 36.1% (235 votes) and other candidates with 0.6% (5 votes), among the 651 ballots cast by the borough's 780 registered voters, for a turnout percentage of 83.5.

United States presidential election results for Lebanon
Year	Republican		Democratic		Third party(ies)	
Year	No.	%	No.	%	No.	%
2024	589	55.20%	456	42.74%	22	2.06%
2020	543	52.41%	466	44.98%	27	2.61%
2016	502	57.18%	345	39.29%	31	3.53%
2012	471	57.51%	335	40.90%	13	1.59%
2008	403	57.08%	294	41.64%	9	1.27%
2004	410	63.08%	235	36.15%	5	0.77%

In the 2013 gubernatorial election, Republican Chris Christie received 77.1% of the vote (373 cast), ahead of Democrat Barbara Buono with 20.5% (99 votes), and other candidates with 2.5% (12 votes), among the 497 ballots cast by the borough's 1,107 registered voters (13 ballots were spoiled), for a turnout of 44.9%. In the 2009 gubernatorial election, Republican Chris Christie received 67.1% of the vote (365 ballots cast), ahead of Democrat Jon Corzine with 19.9% (108 votes), Independent Chris Daggett with 10.1% (55 votes) and other candidates with 1.7% (9 votes), among the 544 ballots cast by the borough's 880 registered voters, yielding a 61.8% turnout.

United States Senate election results for Lebanon1
Year	Republican		Democratic		Third party(ies)	
Year	No.	%	No.	%	No.	%
2024	555	55.72%	419	42.07%	22	2.21%
2018	454	58.96%	285	37.01%	31	4.03%
2012	437	57.05%	305	39.82%	24	3.13%
2006	300	60.73%	176	35.63%	18	3.64%

United States Senate election results for Lebanon2
Year	Republican		Democratic		Third party(ies)	
Year	No.	%	No.	%	No.	%
2020	539	53.95%	437	43.74%	23	2.30%
2014	259	59.00%	169	38.50%	11	2.51%
2013	205	65.08%	108	34.29%	2	0.63%
2008	410	61.84%	225	33.94%	28	4.22%

== Historic district ==
- Lebanon Historic District
- U.S. National Register of Historic Places
- U.S. Historic district
- New Jersey Register of Historic Places
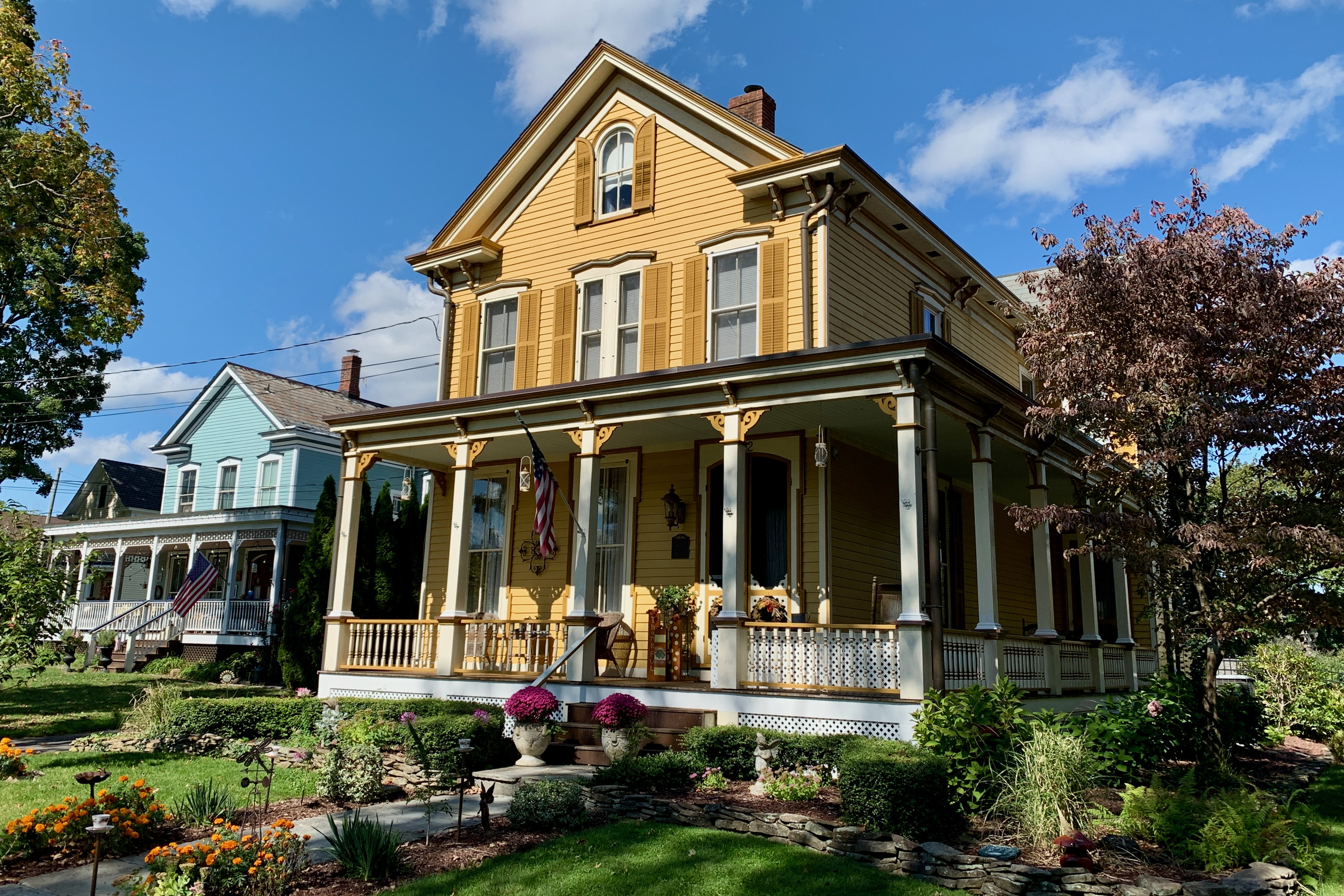
- Italianate style house
- Location: Main St., Cherry St., Brunswick Ave., Maple St., High St., Lebanon Borough, New Jersey
- Area: 91 acres (37 ha)
- Built by: Oscar Apgar; John C. & Harry Stryker
- Architectural style: Italianate, Bungalow/craftsman
- NRHP reference No.: 09000652
- NJRHP No.: 4475

Significant dates
- Added to NRHP: August 26, 2009
- Designated NJRHP: May 1, 2009

The Lebanon Historic District is a historic district encompassing the village of Lebanon. The district was added to the National Register of Historic Places on August 26, 2009, for its significance in architecture and community development from c. 1813 to c. 1942. It includes 227 contributing buildings.

== Education ==
Students in pre-kindergarten through sixth grade for public school are served by the Lebanon Borough School District at Lebanon Borough School. As of the 2018–19 school year, the district, comprised of one school, had an enrollment of 40 students and 13.8 classroom teachers (on an FTE basis), for a student–teacher ratio of 2.9:1. In the 2016–17 school year, Lebanon had the ninth-smallest enrollment of any school district in the state, with 101 students.

Students in seventh and eighth grades attend Clinton Township Middle School in Clinton Township as part of a sending/receiving relationship with the Clinton Township School District. As of the 2018–19 school year, the middle school had an enrollment of 479 students and 57.0 classroom teachers (on an FTE basis), for a student–teacher ratio of 8.4:1.

Public school students in ninth through twelfth grades attend North Hunterdon High School in Annandale together with students from Bethlehem Township, Clinton Town, Clinton Township, Franklin Township and Union Township. As of the 2018–19 school year, the high school had an enrollment of 1,584 students and 123.2 classroom teachers (on an FTE basis), for a student–teacher ratio of 12.9:1. The school is part of the North Hunterdon-Voorhees Regional High School District, which also includes students from Califon, Glen Gardner, Hampton, High Bridge, Lebanon Township and Tewksbury Township, who attend Voorhees High School in Lebanon Township.

Eighth grade students from all of Hunterdon County are eligible to apply to attend the high school programs offered by the Hunterdon County Vocational School District, a county-wide vocational school district that offers career and technical education at its campuses in Raritan Township and at programs sited at local high schools, with no tuition charged to students for attendance.

== Emergency services ==
The Borough of Lebanon is covered by three emergency services providers.

Police and law enforcement is provided by the New Jersey State Police from Troop B, based at the Perryville station.

The Lebanon Volunteer Fire Company provides fire suppression to the borough as per ordinance.

The borough's Emergency Medical and Rescue services are provided by the Clinton First Aid & Rescue Squad.

== Transportation ==
=== Roads and highways ===
As of May 2010, the borough had a total of 7.08 miles (11.39 km) of roadways, of which 4.52 miles (7.27 km) were maintained by the municipality, 0.33 miles (0.53 km) by Hunterdon County and 2.23 miles (3.59 km) by the New Jersey Department of Transportation.

U.S. Route 22 passes through the center of town. Interstate 78 runs through the northern part with Exit 20 within its borders.

=== Public transportation ===
The Lebanon station offers service on NJ Transit's Raritan Valley Line. There is a station building on the south side of the tracks. The northern track is no longer in use and the stop has limited weekday and no weekend service.

== Gallery ==
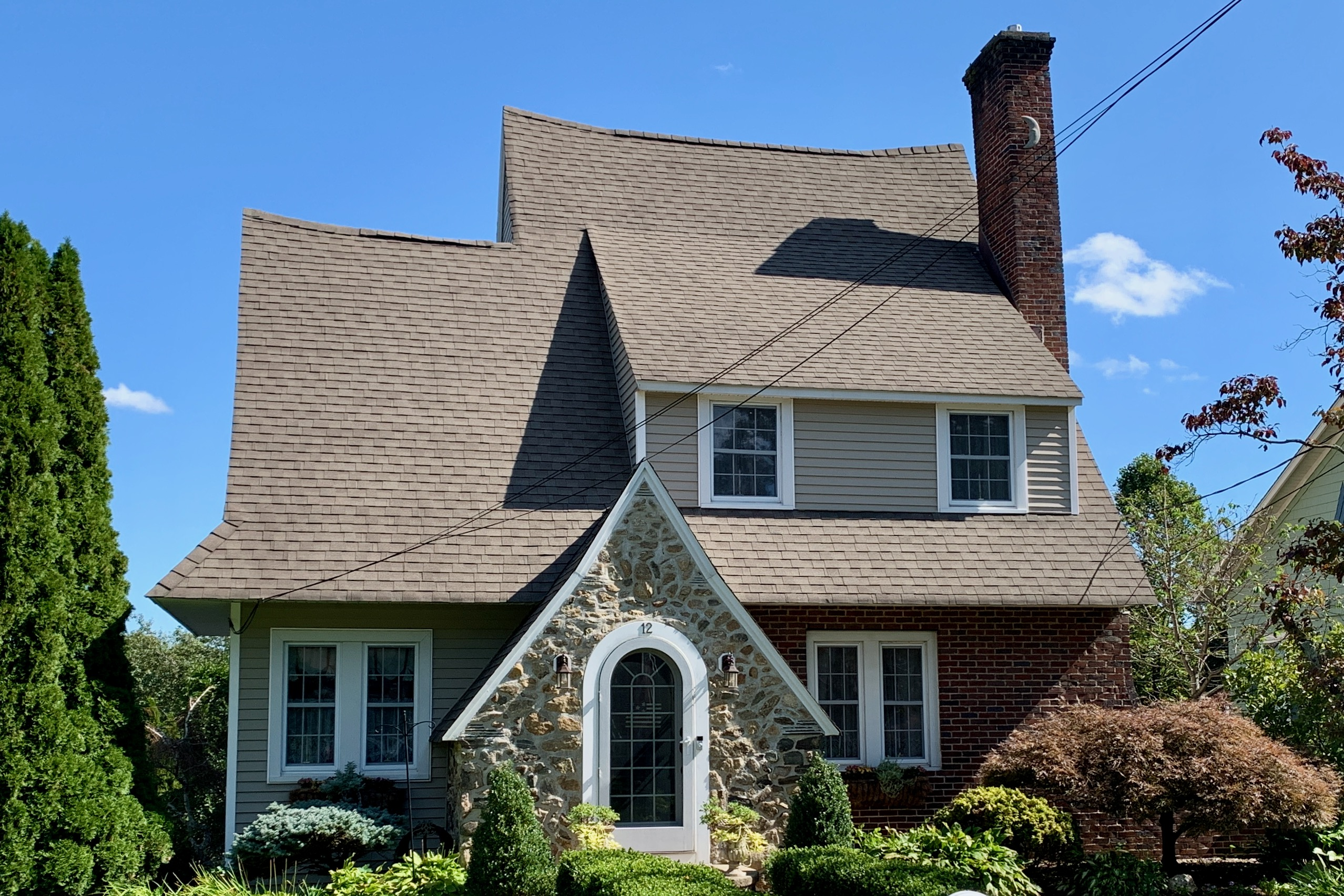
Tudor Revival style house

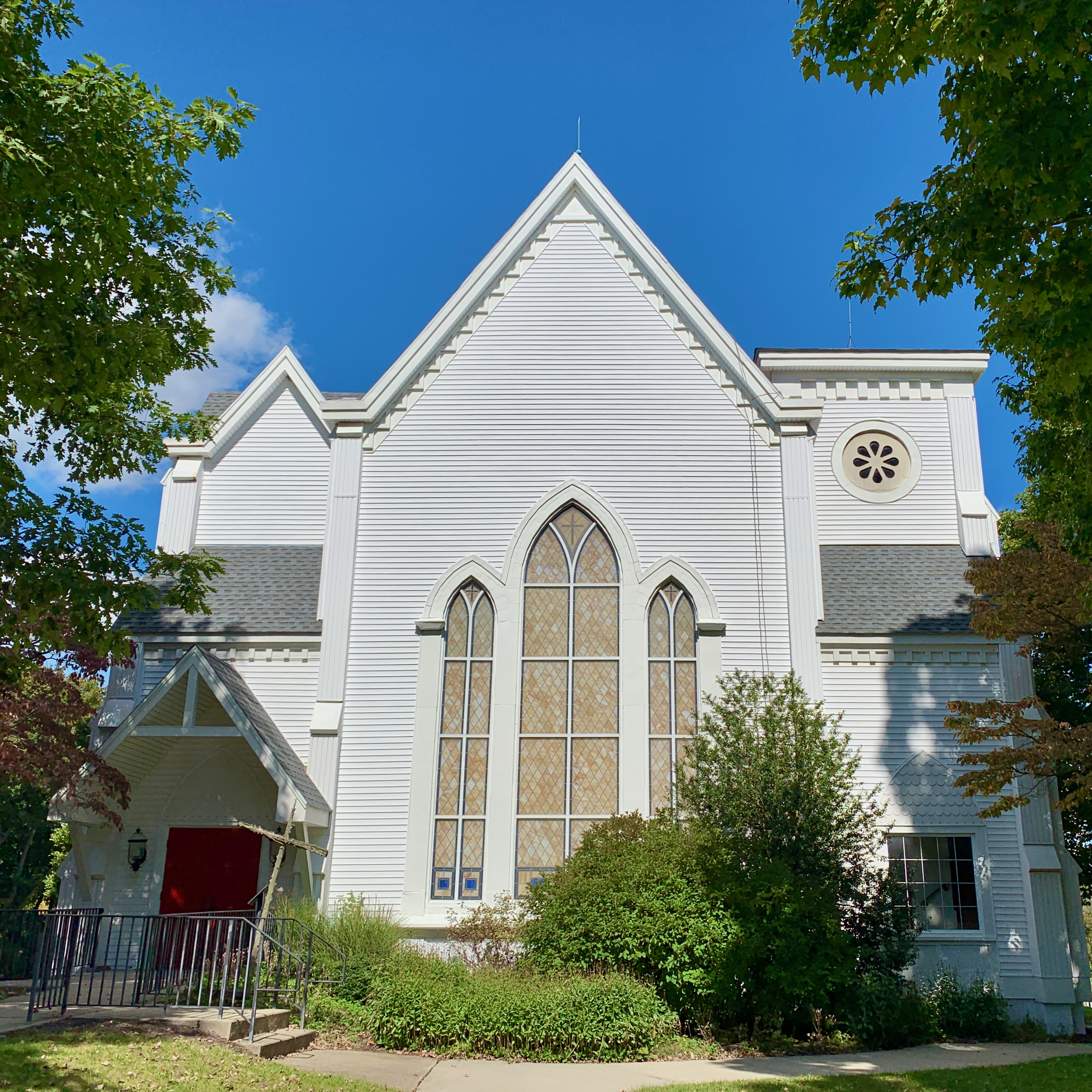
Round Valley United Methodist Church

== Notable people ==
People who were born in, residents of, or otherwise closely associated with Lebanon include:

- Alvah A. Clark (1840–1912), represented New Jersey's 4th congressional district in the United States House of Representatives from 1877 to 1881
- Garrett LeRose (born c. 1985), college football coach who is head coach for Washington and Lee Generals football team
- James N. Pidcock (1836–1899), represented New Jersey's 4th congressional district in the United States House of Representatives from 1885 to 1889

== Points of interest ==
- Hunterdon County Arboretum
- Round Valley Reservoir
- Cushetunk Mountain
