= Lebanon Borough School District =

School district in Hunterdon County, New Jersey, US

Address
- 6 Maple Street Lebanon, Hunterdon County, New Jersey, 08833; United States
- Coordinates: 40°38′36″N 74°49′55″W

District information
- Grades: PreK-6
- Superintendent: Bruce Arcurio
- Business administrator: Tricia Duell
- Schools: 1

Students and staff
- Enrollment: 96 (as of 2022–23)
- Faculty: 12.8 FTEs
- Student–teacher ratio: 7.5:1

Other information
- District Factor Group: I
- Website: District web site
Ind.	Per pupil	District spending	Rank (*)	K-6 average	%± vs. average
1A	Total Spending	$23,859	54	$18,891	26.3%
1	Budgetary Cost	19,365	54	13,649	41.9%
2	Classroom Instruction	10,497	52	8,366	25.5%
6	Support Services	4,386	57	2,161	103.0%
8	Administrative Cost	1,839	44	1,467	25.4%
10	Operations & Maintenance	2,599	56	1,552	67.5%
13	Extracurricular Activities	45	25	39	15.4%
16	Median Teacher Salary	52,000	10	57,437
Data from NJDoE 2014 Taxpayers' Guide to Education Spending. *Of K-6 districts with any number of students. Lowest spending=1; Highest=59

The Lebanon Borough School District is a community public school district that serves students in pre-kindergarten through sixth grade from Lebanon Borough, in Hunterdon County, in the U.S. state of New Jersey.

As of the 2022–23 school year, the district, comprising one school, had an enrollment of 96 students and 12.8 classroom teachers (on an FTE basis), for a student–teacher ratio of 7.5:1. In the 2016–17 school year, Lebanon had the 9th-smallest enrollment of any school district in the state, with 101 students.

The district is classified by the New Jersey Department of Education as being in District Factor Group "I", the second-highest of eight groupings. District Factor Groups organize districts statewide to allow comparison by common socioeconomic characteristics of the local districts. From lowest socioeconomic status to highest, the categories are A, B, CD, DE, FG, GH, I and J.

Students in seventh and eighth grades attend Clinton Township Middle School in Clinton Township as part of a sending/receiving relationship with the Clinton Township School District. As of the 2018–19 school year, the high school had an enrollment of 479 students and 57.0 classroom teachers (on an FTE basis), for a student–teacher ratio of 8.4:1.

Public school students in ninth through twelfth grades attend North Hunterdon High School in Annandale together with students from Bethlehem Township, Clinton Town, Clinton Township, Franklin Township and Union Township. As of the 2018–19 school year, the high school had an enrollment of 1,584 students and 123.2 classroom teachers (on an FTE basis), for a student–teacher ratio of 12.9:1. The school is part of the North Hunterdon-Voorhees Regional High School District, which also includes students from Califon, Glen Gardner, Hampton, High Bridge, Lebanon Township and Tewksbury Township, who attend Voorhees High School in Lebanon Township.

== School ==
The Lebanon Borough School served an enrollment of 93 students as of the 2018–19 school year.

== Administration ==
Core members of the district's administration are:

- Bruce Arcurio, superintendent
- Tricia Duell, board secretary and business administrator

== Board of education ==
The district's board of education, composed of five members, sets policy and oversees the fiscal and educational operation of the district through its administration. As a Type II school district, the board's trustees are elected directly by voters to serve three-year terms of office on a staggered basis, with either one or two seats up for election each year held (since 2012) as part of the November general election. The board appoints a superintendent to oversee the district's day-to-day operations and a business administrator to supervise the business functions of the district.
