= Readingsburg, New Jersey =

Populated place in Hunterdon County, New Jersey, US

- Unincorporated community
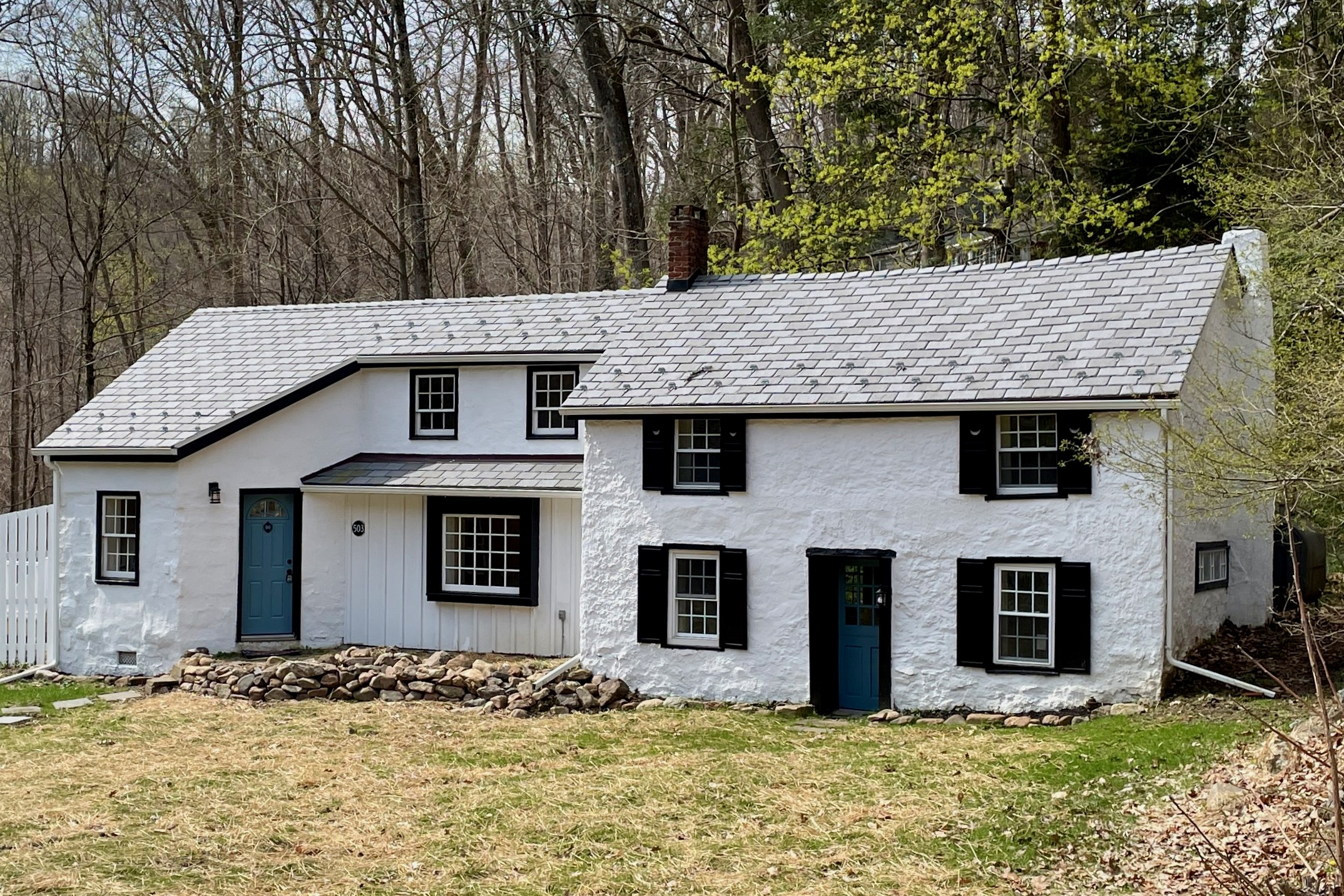
- Stuccoed stone house with Colonial Revival embellishment

- Location within Hunterdon County, New Jersey Location within New Jersey Location within the United States
- Coordinates: 40°40′55″N 74°52′37″W
- Country: United States
- State: New Jersey
- County: Hunterdon
- Township: Clinton
- Named after: James Newell Reading
- Elevation: 318 ft (97 m)
- Time zone: UTC−05:00 (Eastern (EST))
  - Summer (DST): UTC−04:00 (EDT)
- GNIS feature ID: 883138

Readingsburg, also known as Stone Mill, is an unincorporated community located along the South Branch Raritan River within Clinton Township in Hunterdon County, New Jersey.

The community is centered at County Route 639 at the intersection of Raritan River Road and Cokesbury Road, and is located 3.6 miles (5.8 km) northeast of Spruce Run Reservoir and 4.5 miles (7.2 km) east-southeast of Hampton.

Readingsburg is located in New Jersey's Highlands geographical province, in northern Hunterdon County at the mouth of the Ken Lockwood Gorge in the narrow, heavily wooded valley cut by the south branch of the Raritan River through the first hills rising above the Piedmont lowlands. The small hamlet hugs the east bank of the south branch at the intersection of a road crossing the river with another following its east bank. A water power site first utilized in the second quarter of the 19th century provided the nucleus for the settlement which consists of several houses clustered around the cross roads as well as mill sites up and down stream from the bridge and two houses on the west bag of the river. The community is surrounded mostly by Woodland with scattered dwellings. The town of Highbridge is located about 1 mile south of Readingsburg; the village of Cokesbury lies several miles to the east.

The hamlet of Readingsburg, also called Stone Mill, is the site of 18th and 19th Century watered powered mills. According to a previous State Historical marker, since removed, it was placed on the State Register of historic sites in 1999.

Previous owners and operators of the Mill lived in the stone house located at 2 Stone Mill Road, Annandale NJ 98801. The building located at 450 Cokesbury Road was the General Store.

== History ==
The community is named after James Newell Reading (1808–1884), a great-great grandson of New Jersey colonial governor John Reading (1686–1767), who built a saw mill here in 1847–49. Remnants of the old Reading/Hoffman/Alpaugh Saw & Grist Mill are located directly across the street from the stone house located at 2 Stone Mill Road. Previous owners and operators of the Mill lived in the stone house.

An original, smaller wood-frame house (east wing) encompassed the right bay of the existing stone structure located at 2 Stone Mill Road. It included a second story porch facing the river. Two large trees were cut down the middle and laid upon two rows of rocks to support the pumpkin pine floorboards. In the mid-1800s, the left bay of the structure was added. When the Mill closed down in the 1940s, the entire house was clad with stone from the original Mill located across the road. Despite evidence of numerous fires, including the one in 2013 which nearly destroyed the entire house and killed lots of cats, making it uninhabitable for five years, some of the original features still remain. This includes the deep window wells in the large windows facing the river, and the stone retaining walls.

== Historic district ==
- Readingsburg Historic District
- U.S. National Register of Historic Places
- U.S. Historic district
- New Jersey Register of Historic Places
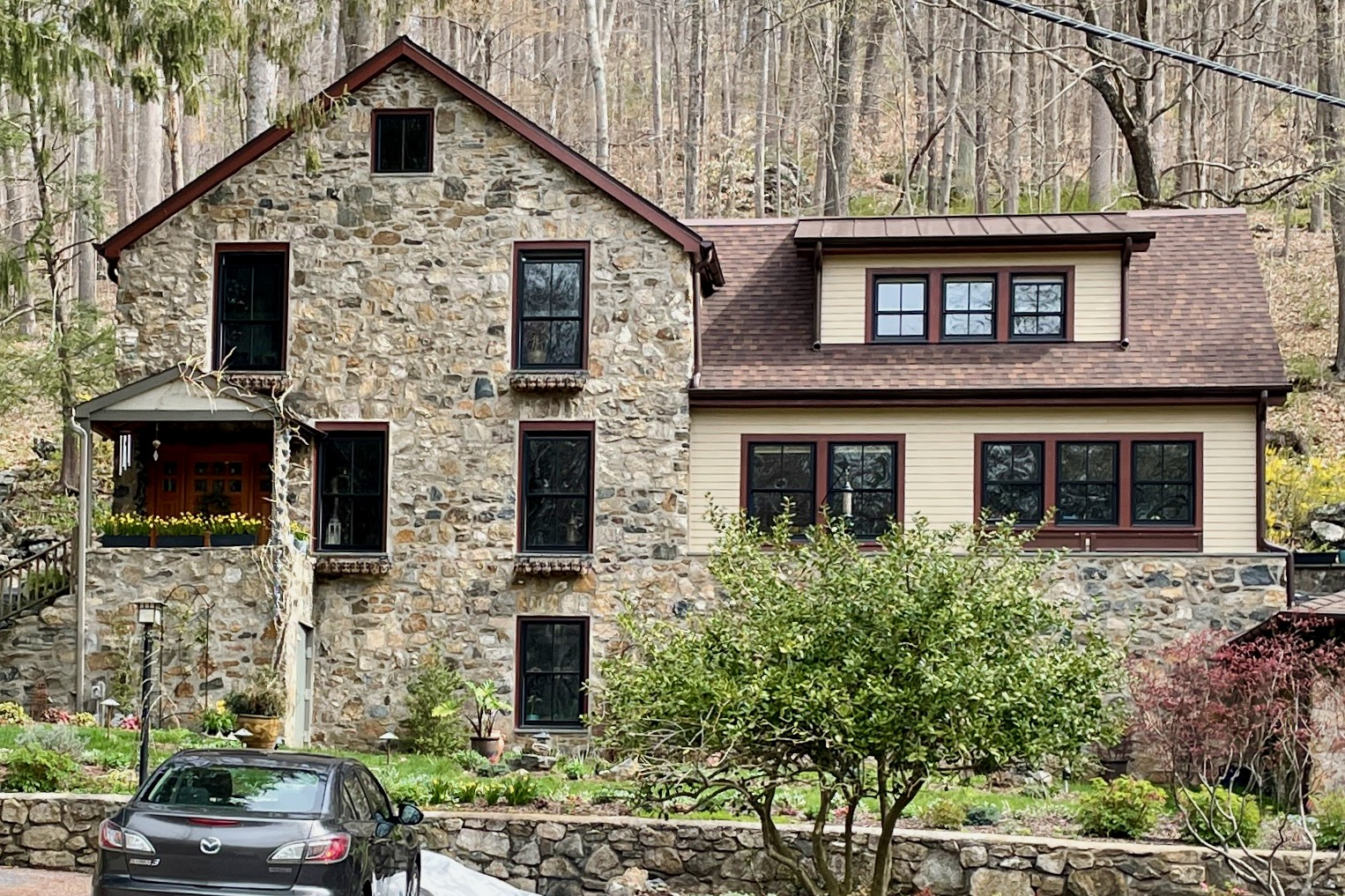
- Stone house with Greek Revival influences
- Location: Cokesbury and Stone Mill Roads, County Route 639
- Area: 25 acres (10 ha)
- NRHP reference No.: 00000176
- NJRHP No.: 289

Significant dates
- Added to NRHP: March 3, 2000
- Designated NJRHP: January 20, 2000

The Readingsburg Historic District is a 25-acre (10 ha) historic district encompassing the community. It was added to the National Register of Historic Places on March 3, 2000, for its significance in architecture, community planning and development. The district includes eight contributing buildings, two contributing structures, and two contributing sites.

The house at 450 Cokesbury Road shows Italianate influences with Queen Anne embellishment. It has a low-pitched hip roof and

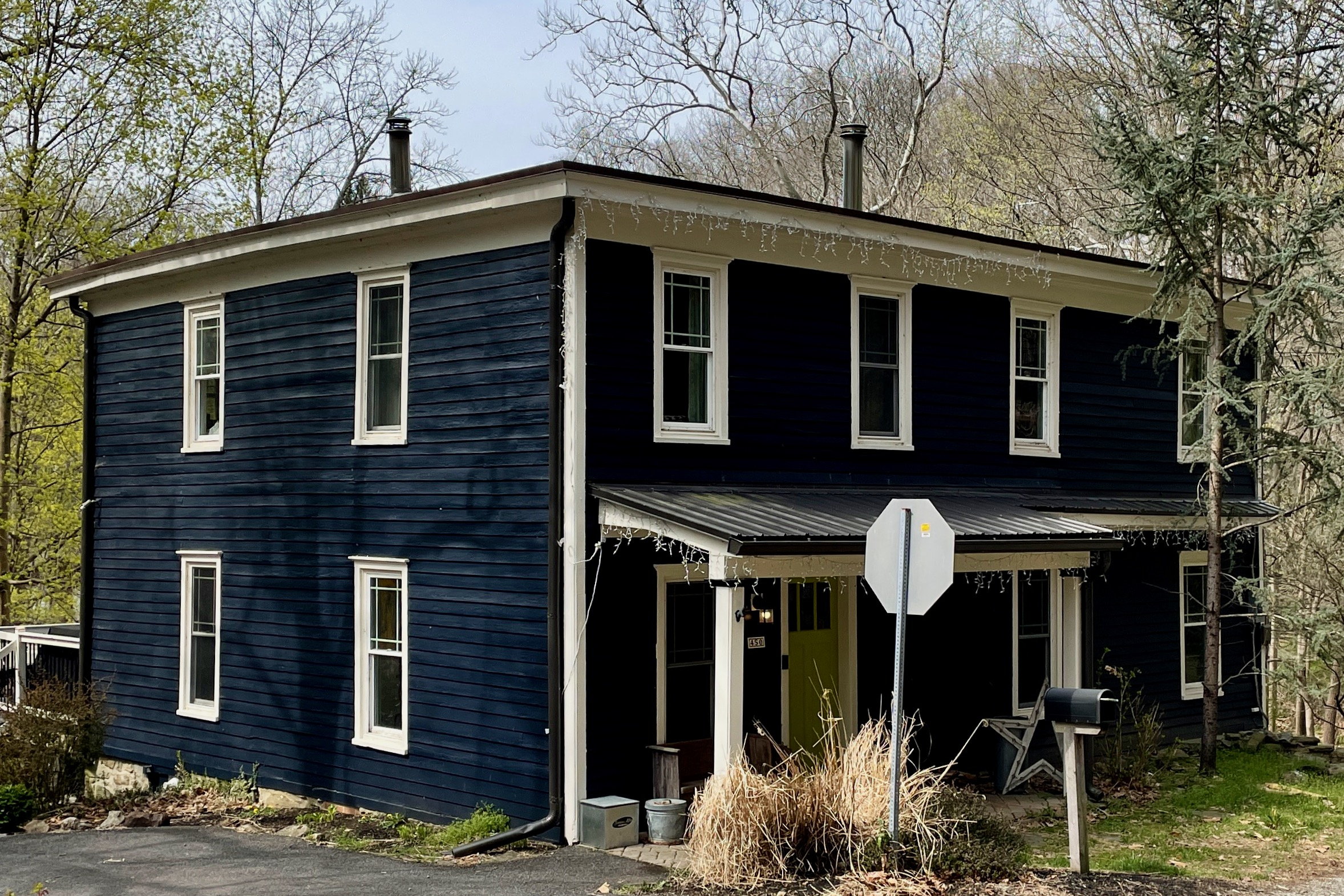
Italianate style house at 450 Cokesbury Road

== Points of interest ==
The Columbia Trail passes through the community and connects to the nearby Ken Lockwood Gorge in Lebanon Township. The gorge can also be reached via Raritan River Road. Raritan River Road runs as a continuation of Stone Mill Road into the Ken Lockwood Gorge.

== See also ==
- National Register of Historic Places listings in Hunterdon County, New Jersey
