= Garrett LeRose =

American football coach (born c. 1985)

Current position
- Title: Head coach
- Team: Washington and Lee
- Conference: ODAC
- Record: 46–27

Biographical details
- Born: c. 1985 (age 40–41); Lebanon, New Jersey, U.S.
- Education: Washington and Lee University (2007)

Playing career
- 2003–2006: Washington and Lee
- Position: Wide receiver

Coaching career (HC unless noted)
- 2007: Washington and Lee (SA)
- 2008–2010: Washington and Lee (WR/TE)
- 2011–2014: Washington and Lee (ST/DB)
- 2015–2017: Washington and Lee (AHC/ST/WR/TE)
- 2018–present: Washington and Lee

Head coaching record
- Overall: 46–27
- Bowls: 2–1
- Tournaments: 0–1 (NCAA D-III playoffs)

Accomplishments and honors

Championships
- 1 ODAC (2021)

Awards
- ODAC Coach of the Year (2021)

Garrett LeRose (born c. 1985) is an American college football coach. He is the head football coach for Washington and Lee University, a position he has held since 2018. He played college football for Washington and Lee as a wide receiver.

Raised in Lebanon, New Jersey, LeRose played prep football at Hunterdon Central Regional High School.

== Head coaching record ==
Year	Team	Overall	Conference	Standing	Bowl/playoffs
Washington and Lee Generals (Old Dominion Athletic Conference) (2018–present)
2018	Washington and Lee	5–4	3–4	T–4th	
2019	Washington and Lee	6–4	5–3	4th	
2020–21	No team—COVID-19				
2021	Washington and Lee	8–3	5–1	T–1st	L NCAA Division III First Round
2022	Washington and Lee	5–5	3–4	5th	
2023	Washington and Lee	8–3	6–1	2nd	L Chesapeake Challenge
2024	Washington and Lee	7–4	5–2	T–2nd	W Cape Henry
2025	Washington and Lee	7–4	6–2	T–2nd	W Cape Charles
2026	Washington and Lee	0–0	0–0		
Washington and Lee:		46–27	33–17		
Total:		46–27			
