= Walter Chandoha =

American photographer (1920–2019)

- Born: November 30, 1920; Bayonne, New Jersey, US
- Died: January 11, 2019 (aged 98); Annandale, New Jersey, US
- Education: N.Y.U. School of Commerce, Accounts and Finance
- Occupation: Photographer
- Spouse: Maria Ratti (m. 1949; died 1992)
- Website: Chandoha Photography

Walter George Chandoha (November 30, 1920 – January 11, 2019) was a prolific American photographer, known especially for his photographs of animals and particularly of cats. Additional subjects for which he is known are fruits, vegetables, flowers, and New York City street scenes. Over his long career, his archive grew to more than 225,000 photographs including approximately 90,000 photographs of cats. Hyperallergic called him "the one cat photographer to rule them all."

== Early life ==
He began taking photographs as a child using his family's Kodak camera and later joined a camera club in Bayonne where he learned darkroom skills. After graduating from Bayonne High School, he worked as an assistant to illustrator Leon de Voss.

== Career ==
Chandoha was drafted into the army during World War II where he served as a press photographer and then as a combat photographer in the Pacific War theater. In 1949, he was graduated from N.Y.U. School of Commerce, Accounts, and Finance under the G.I. Bill.

That same year he married Maria Ratti and they moved into an apartment in Queens, New York. On his way home from classes at NYU one night that winter, he found a kitten shivering in the snow. The kitten, Loco, became one of his favorite subjects. His enjoyment of photographing that cat prompted him to become a free-lance photographer and he eventually specialized in photographs of cats. His preferred method for photographing cats was to meet them at their eye level. The couple later moved to a farm in New Jersey where they raised their six children, often adding his children to the photographs to portray the interactions between young kids and cats.

His photographs have been used on more than 300 magazine covers and in thousands of advertisements. He authored at least 34 books, including Walter Chandoha's Book of Kittens and Cats, Walter Chandoha's Book of Puppies and Dogs, How to Photograph Cats, Dogs, and Other Animals, How to Shoot and Sell Animal Photos, All Kinds of Cats, and Mind Your Manners!. He and his work have been the subject of many books and museum exhibitions.

Chandoha was once quoted as saying, "Cats are my favourite animal subject because of their unlimited range of attitude, posture, expression and coloration."

== Death ==
Chandoha died on January 11, 2019, in Annandale, New Jersey, at the age of 98. His last cat was Maddie, a rescue cat the family adopted from New Jersey in 2018.
