= John B. Evans =

Welsh-born American media executive (1938–2004)

- Born: John Berwyn Evans; 26 January 1938; Ruthin, Wales
- Died: 28 March 2004 (aged 66); Annandale, New Jersey, United States
- Occupation: Media executive
- Website: johnbevans.com

John Berwyn Evans (26 January 1938 – 28 March 2004) was a Welsh-born American media executive.

== Early life ==
Evans was born in Ruthin, Wales, the son of a lawyer. He was raised in England and studied law at Cambridge University. After briefly practising with his father, Evans left the legal profession to work as a professional yachtsman, sailing in the Caribbean, the Atlantic and the Mediterranean. He arrived in the United States in the early 1970s after delivering a vessel from Venezuela to New York City and subsequently began working in advertising.

== Career ==
Evans began his media career at The Village Voice, where he rose from the classifieds department to become publisher. When Rupert Murdoch purchased the paper in 1977, Evans joined News Corporation and later oversaw several of its magazines, including Elle, Seventeen, and TV Guide. He was instrumental in developing the "Jaguar" project, an early electronic travel information system.

In 1990, after the sale of the magazine division, Evans moved to London to direct the business operations of Murdoch's British newspaper holdings, including The Times, The Sunday Times and The Sun. In 1992, Evans founded his own media ventures, including News Electronic Data Inc. In 1995 he bought it (in partnership with Intel Corporation) renaming it to BizTravel.com. He also established the media consulting firm REM Productions Inc.

Known for his futuristic vision of digital media, Evans frequently spoke at technology conferences alongside figures such as Bill Gates and Andrew Grove.

== Later life and death ==
Evans lived in rural New Jersey, where he ran several media and technology businesses. He died of congestive heart failure at his home in Annandale, on 28 March 2004, aged 66. He was married three times, all ending in divorce, and was survived by a daughter, stepdaughter, and a sister.
