= Annandale, New Jersey =

Place in Hunterdon County, New Jersey, United States

- Census-designated place
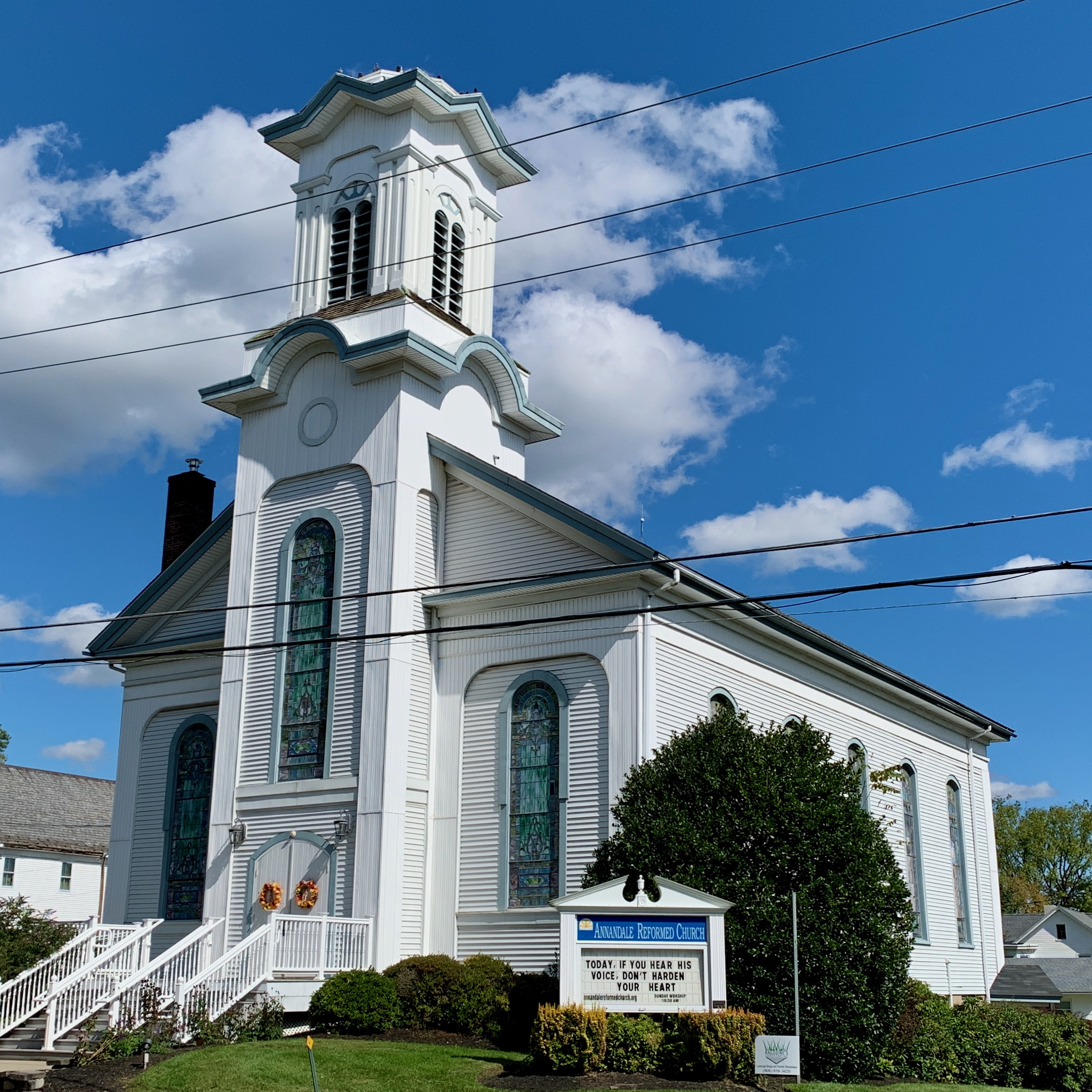
- Annandale Reformed Church in Annandale, October 2020

- Map of Annandale CDP in Hunterdon County. Inset: Location of Hunterdon County in New Jersey.

- Location in Hunterdon County Location in New Jersey Location in the United States
- Coordinates: 40.646838°N 74.888177°W
- Country: United States
- State: New Jersey
- County: Hunterdon
- Township: Clinton

Area
  - Total: 1.45 sq mi (3.76 km^{2})
  - Land: 1.45 sq mi (3.76 km^{2})
  - Water: 0 sq mi (0.00 km^{2}) 0.00%
- Elevation: 423 ft (129 m)

Population (2020)
  - Total: 1,663
  - Density: 1,147.0/sq mi (442.85/km^{2})
- Time zone: UTC−05:00 (Eastern (EST))
  - Summer (DST): UTC−04:00 (Eastern (EDT))
- ZIP Code: 08801
- Area code: 908
- FIPS code: 34-01480
- GNIS feature ID: 02389137

Annandale is an unincorporated community and census-designated place (CDP) located within Clinton Township, in Hunterdon County, in the U.S. state of New Jersey. As of the 2020 census, Annandale had a population of 1,663. The Annandale Historic District was listed on the state and national registers of historic places in 1994.

== Geography ==
According to the United States Census Bureau, Annandale had a total area of 1.452 square miles (3.76 km^{2}), all of which was land. It has a hot-summer humid continental climate (Dfa) and average monthly temperatures range from 28.2 °F in January to 72.9 °F in July. The hardiness zone is 6b.

== Demographics ==
Historical population
Census	Pop.	Note	%±
1980	1,040		—
1990	1,074		3.3%
2000	1,276		18.8%
2010	1,695		32.8%
2020	1,663		−1.9%
Population sources: 1950 1960 1970; 1980 1990 2000; 2010

Annandale first appeared as a census designated place in the 1980 U.S. census.

=== 2020 census ===
Annandale CDP, New Jersey – Racial and ethnic composition Note: the US Census treats Hispanic/Latino as an ethnic category. This table excludes Latinos from the racial categories and assigns them to a separate category. Hispanics/Latinos may be of any race.
Race / Ethnicity (NH = Non-Hispanic)	Pop 2000	Pop 2010	Pop 2020	% 2000	% 2010	% 2020
White alone (NH)	1,217	1,406	1,343	95.38%	82.95%	80.76%
Black or African American alone (NH)	8	40	30	0.63%	2.36%	1.80%
Native American or Alaska Native alone (NH)	0	5	1	0.00%	0.29%	0.06%
Asian alone (NH)	28	123	100	2.19%	7.26%	6.01%
Native Hawaiian or Pacific Islander alone (NH)	0	0	0	0.00%	0.00%	0.00%
Other race alone (NH)	0	5	17	0.00%	0.29%	1.02%
Mixed race or Multiracial (NH)	1	37	73	0.08%	2.18%	4.39%
Hispanic or Latino (any race)	22	79	99	1.72%	4.66%	5.95%
Total	1,276	1,695	1,663	100.00%	100.00%	100.00%

=== 2010 census ===
The 2010 United States census counted 1,695 people, 658 households, and 455 families in the CDP. The population density was 1,167.6 people per square mile (450.8 people/km^{2}). There were 692 housing units at an average density of 476.7 units per square mile (184.1 units/km^{2}). The racial makeup was 86.61% (1,468) White, 2.48% (42) Black or African American, 0.35% (6) Native American, 7.32% (124) Asian, 0.00% (0) Pacific Islander, 0.77% (13) from other races, and 2.48% (42) from two or more races. Hispanic or Latino of any race were 4.66% (79) of the population.

Of the 658 households, 38.8% had children under the age of 18; 56.4% were married couples living together; 9.6% had a female householder with no husband present and 30.9% were non-families. Of all households, 25.2% were made up of individuals and 7.8% had someone living alone who was 65 years of age or older. The average household size was 2.58 and the average family size was 3.15.

27.7% of the population were under the age of 18, 5.7% from 18 to 24, 27.3% from 25 to 44, 31.3% from 45 to 64, and 8.1% who were 65 years of age or older. The median age was 39.1 years. For every 100 females, the population had 92.2 males. For every 100 females ages 18 and older there were 94.3 males.

=== 2000 census ===
As of the 2000 United States census there were 1,276 people, 451 households, and 354 families living in the CDP. The population density was 339.8 people/km^{2} (880 people/mi^{2}). There were 472 housing units at an average density of 125.7 units/km^{2} (326 units/mi^{2}). The racial makeup of the CDP was 96.47% White, 0.63% African American, 2.19% Asian, 0.63% from other races, and 0.08% from two or more races. Hispanic or Latino of any race were 1.72% of the population.

There were 451 households, out of which 43.2% had children under the age of 18 living with them, 68.7% were married couples living together, 6.7% had a female householder with no husband present, and 21.5% were non-families. 16.4% of all households were made up of individuals, and 7.5% had someone living alone who was 65 years of age or older. The average household size was 2.83 and the average family size was 3.23.

In the CDP the population was spread out, with 29.0% under the age of 18, 4.7% from 18 to 24, 32.1% from 25 to 44, 25.7% from 45 to 64, and 8.5% who were 65 years of age or older. The median age was 38 years. For every 100 females, there were 96.9 males. For every 100 females age 18 and over, there were 97.4 males.

The median income for a household in the CDP was $80,738, and the median income for a family was $104,009. Males had a median income of $65,814 versus $37,171 for females. The per capita income for the CDP was $30,176. None of the families and 1.0% of the population were living below the poverty line, including no under eighteens and 8.0% of those over 64.

== Historic district ==
- Annandale Historic District
- U.S. National Register of Historic Places
- U.S. Historic district
- New Jersey Register of Historic Places
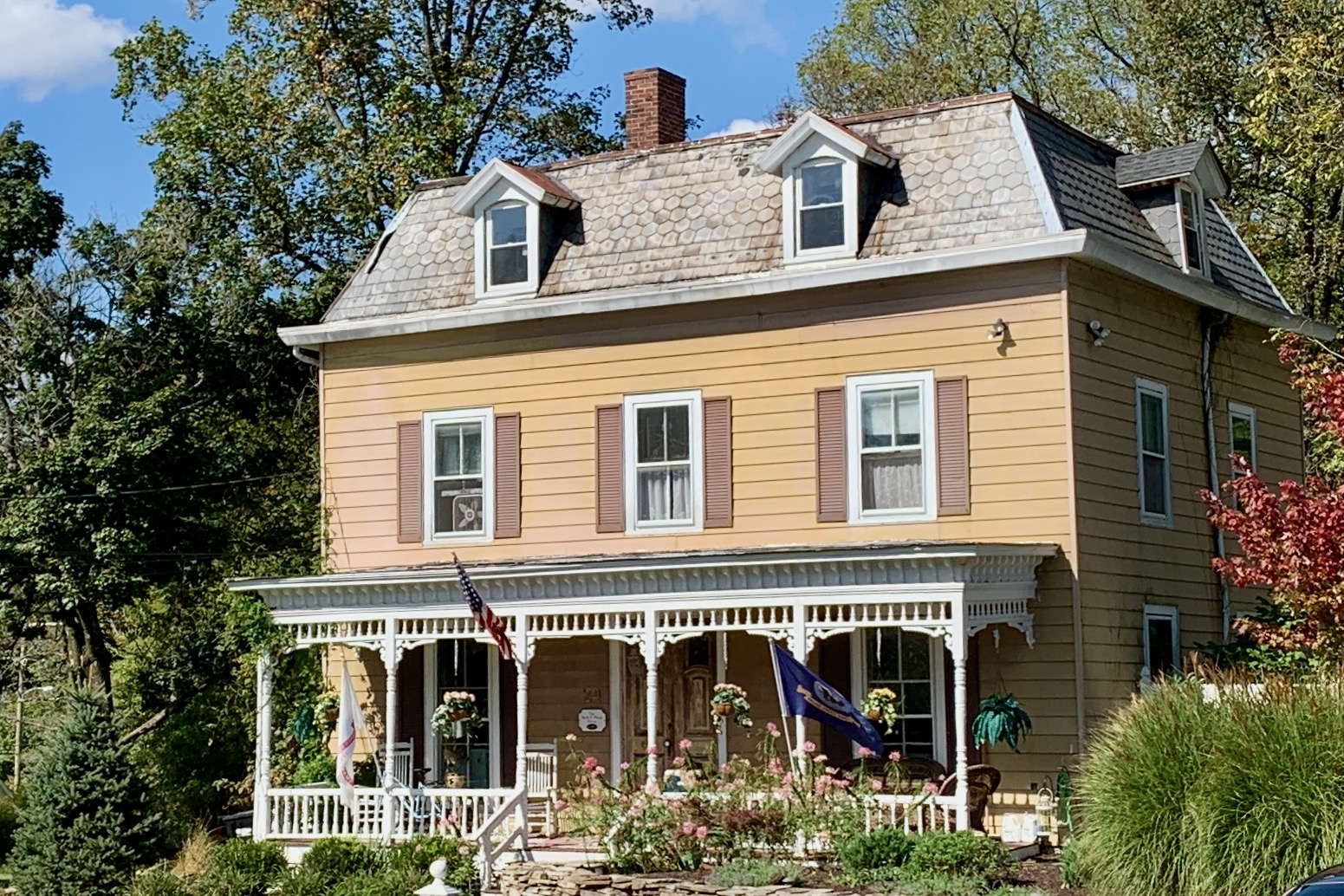
- Second Empire/Queen Anne style house
- Location: Roughly bounded by Maple Avenue, Main Street, Beaver Avenue and East Street
- Area: less than one acre
- Built: 1852
- Architectural style: Italianate, Queen Anne, Colonial Revival
- NRHP reference No.: 94001108
- NJRHP No.: 1574

Significant dates
- Added to NRHP: September 8, 1994
- Designated NJRHP: August 1, 1994

The Annandale Historic District is a historic district surrounding the village of Annandale. On September 9, 1994, the district was added to the National Register of Historic Places for its cultural importance in architecture, commerce, and industry from 1852 to 1930. It includes 191 contributing buildings.

== Education ==
Immaculate Conception School (PreK-8) operates under the supervision of Roman Catholic Diocese of Metuchen.

== Points of interest ==
- Jones Tavern, former recruiting station for the militia of Hunterdon County.

== Gallery ==
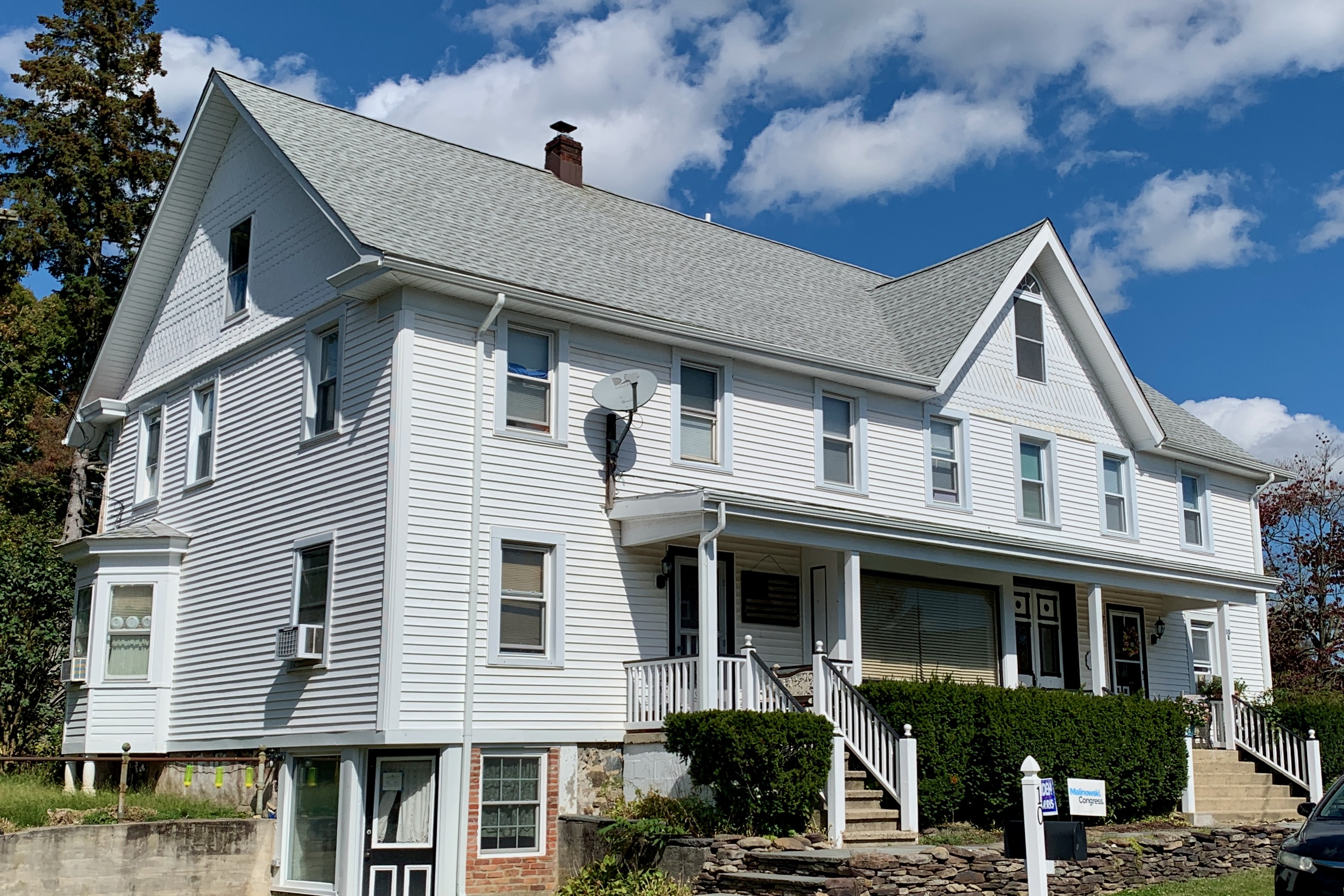
Former Annandale Hotel

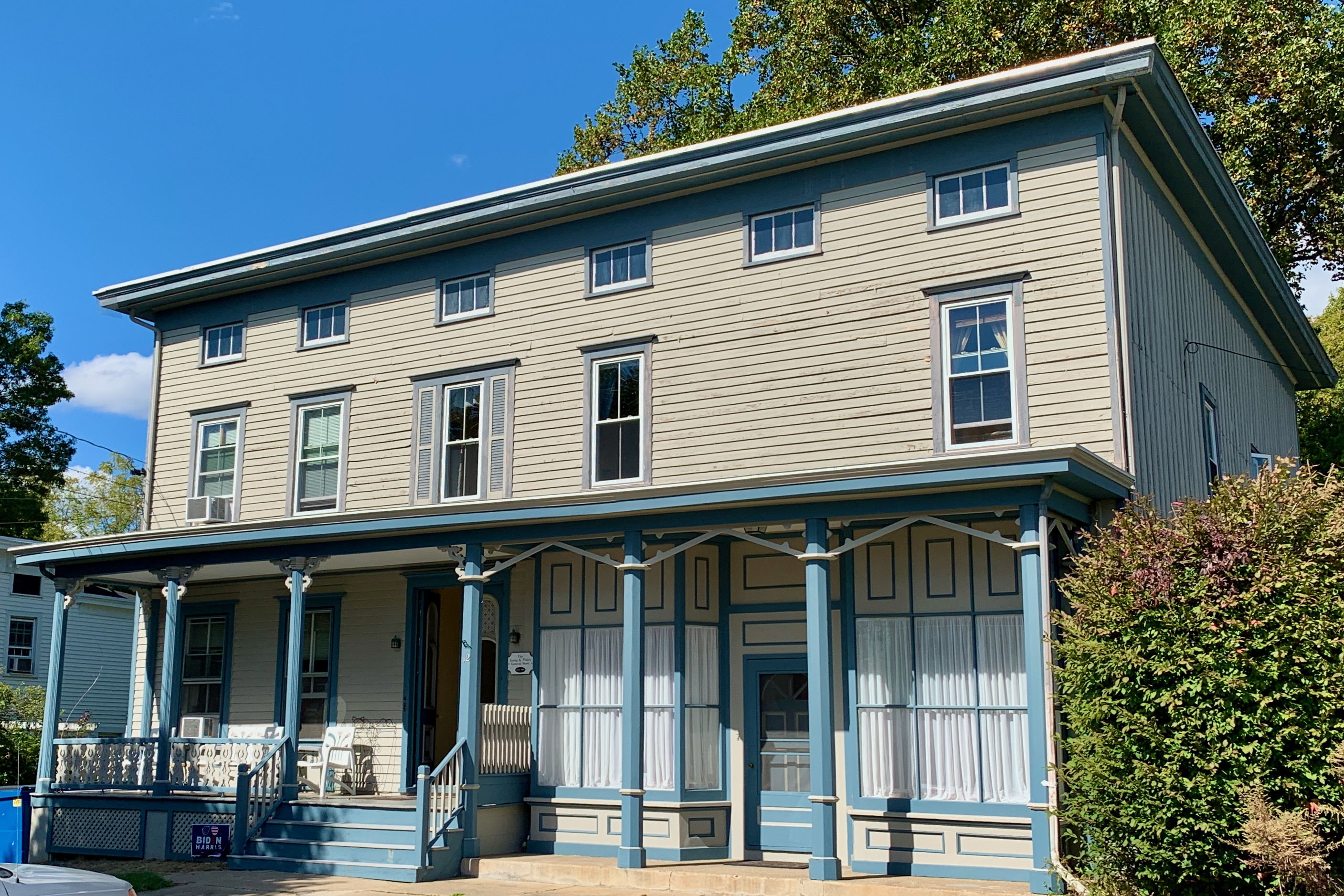
Former Young and Finley General Store

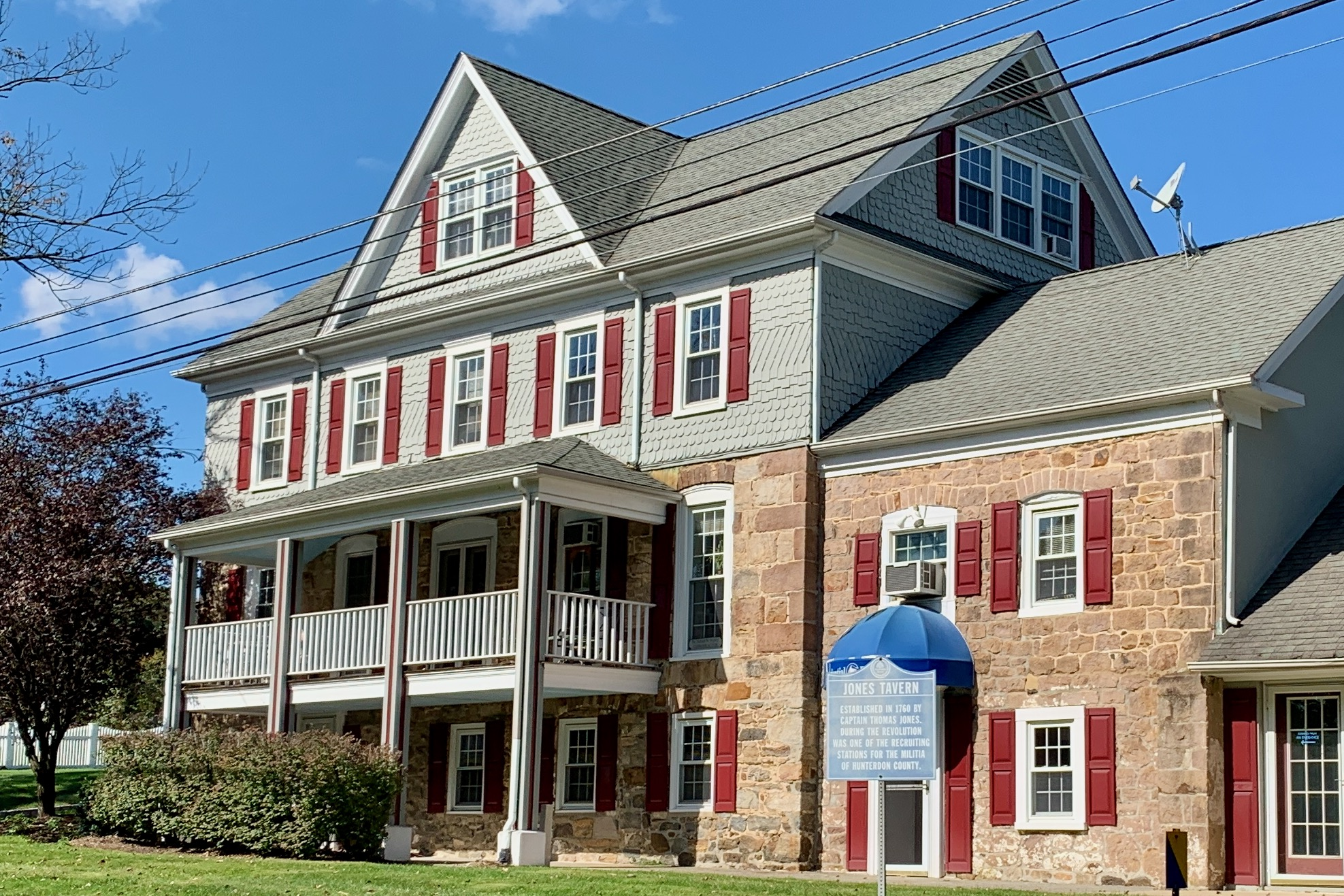
Jones Tavern

== Notable people ==
People who were born in, residents of, or otherwise closely associated with Annandale include:

- Walter Chandoha (1920–2019), animal photographer, known especially for his 90,000 photographs of cats.
- John B. Evans (1942–2004), media executive and publisher of The Village Voice.
- Matt McDonald (born 1993), distance runner who specializes in the marathon and has placed in the top 25 in seven World Marathon Majors
- Josh Melnick (born 1995), professional ice hockey player who played for the Straubing Tigers of the Deutsche Eishockey Liga

== In popular culture ==
- According to the deed from "Previously On", the fictional town of Westview from WandaVision is coextensive with Annandale.
